= Inna Lisnyanskaya =

Jewish-Russian poet (1928–2014)

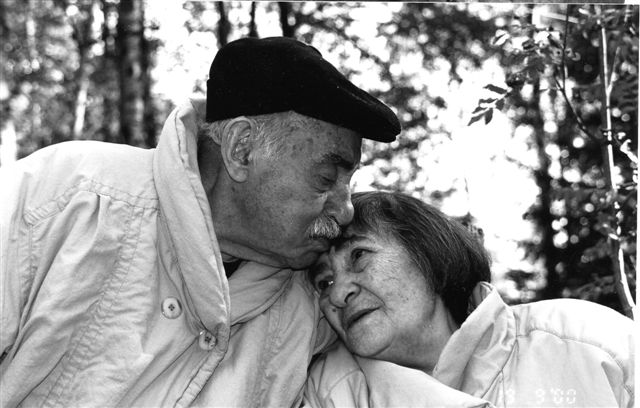
- Lisnyanskaya (Right) with her husband, Semyon Lipkin (left), 2000
- Native name: Инна Лисянская
- Born: 1928 Baku, Azerbaijan Soviet Socialist Republic
- Died: 2014 (aged 85–86) Haifa, Israel
- Occupation: Poet; translator
- Language: Russian
- Genre: Poetry, essays
- Notable works: Rains and Mirrors; On the Verge of Sleep; Poems (in Russian language); Without You
- Notable awards: Solzhenitsyn Prize; Russia's Poet Prize

Inna Lisnyanskaya or Inna Lisnianskaya (Russian: Инна Лиснянская; 1928–2014) was a Jewish-Russian poet from USSR, later Russia. Her most creative period of writing occurred in the village for poets and writers of Peredelkino near Moscow, where she lived with her husband and co-worker, Semyon Lipkin. Her daughter Elena Makarova is also a well-known writer. She was a recipient of the Solzhenitsyn Prize and Russia's Poet Prize.

== Biography ==
Lisnyanskaya was born in 1928, in Baku, Azerbaijan Soviet Socialist Republic, to a Jewish father and Armenian mother. Her Armenian grandmother baptized her in Armenian Orthodoxy when she was a child. Lisnyanskaya grew up in Baku, in a house where three languages were present: Yiddish, Russian and Armenian. In 2000, she said to Maxim D. Shrayer, editor of the Jewish-Russian anthology, that in 1944, when it became known about the Holocaust, she officially claimed that she was of Jewish ethnicity to protest the fascist murder of Jewish people; she believed in Jesus Christ as well and wrote about the Jewish culture in her poetry.

When Inna was a 5th grade class pupil, she worked as an aide in an Azerbaijani military hospital during the last period of World War II where Soviet soldiers with facial wounds were treated. Later she wrote a sonnet In Hospital of Facial Wound.

Inna Lisyanskaya spent a year in Baku State University, then dropped out. She began writing some poetry, as well as translations from Azerbaijani to Russian in 1948. Her first collection of poetry was published in 1957 in Baku.

Once, Inna Lisyanskaya was, in the early 1960s, listening to Semyon Lipkin reading his poetry about World War II in Moscow Central Writers' House, later they met in 1967 and married.

=== Resignation from Soviet Writer's Union ===
Russian almanac Metropole, published abroad, rearranged a collection of young Soviet poets in 1979 to publish, but all writers in the Soviet Union must first take permission from the Communist government for every publication. The Communist government hadn't allowed them to do this, but Metropole was anyway published in the US, and as a result two Soviet young writers, Viktor Yerofeyev and Evgeniy Popov, were expelled from the Soviet Writer's Union. Lisnyanskaya, Semyon Lipkin and writer Vasily Aksyonov (Aksyonov was more known and published in the USSR, but Lipkin was the elder in their group, born in 1913) decided to support the young writers and left the Soviet Writer's Union in sympathy with the young poets. The leaving of the Soviet Writer's Union resulted in the poets being banned from publishing anything anymore in the Soviet Union, and banned from traveling abroad. The American writer Ronald Meyer secretly sent their poetry over diplomatic dispatches abroad. Lisnyanskaya said in an interview in 1990 that the prohibitions were even good for her poetic work, because she ceased to be forced to censor herself for Soviet publications, because she was not anymore writing for the Soviet Union, but only for close friends. But the Communist government continued to pressure her also to cease all her foreign publications, so Lisnyanskaya was partly forced to stop from publishing some of her poetry abroad.

=== 1987 ===
All restrictions were lifted in 1987, and her poetry was published in many Soviet magazines. She became a major Soviet poet, her first Russian book of poetry, Poems, was printed in 1991, and she was awarded with the Solzhenitsyn Prize and Russia's Poet Prize.

=== Without You ===
A collection of her poetry, Without You was dedicated to her friend, co-worker, and husband, Semyon Lipkin, when Lisnyanskaya lost him in 2004. American writer Ronald Meyer, who often visited her in the village of Peredelkino and became friends, said the book was a talented, remarkable work.

=== Russian PEN ===
Lisnyanskaya was also one of the organizers of the Russian Pen Center.

=== Without Semyon Lipkin ===
Lisnyanskaya died in 2014 in Haifa, Israel.

== Poetry ==
Joseph Brodsky, a Russian poet and Nobel laureate, said once in an interview for the magazine 'Russian Thought' that he was significantly touched by poetry written by Lisnyanskaya and Semyon Lipkin.

Lisnyanskaya's poetry was once called by poet Elaine Feinstein as an echo of the tradition of Anna Akhmatova's great poetry and a transcendence of particular language:

Naked thoughts live unembellished.

That saying's a lie, you can't

Twice and so forth, whatever it is.

A thousandth time I enter the same river.

And I see the same grey stone on the bottom,

The same carp with its gristly fins ...

('Naked thoughts live unembellished' from Far from Sodom, a book of poetry translated by Daniel Weissbort)

A collection of Lisnyanskaya's poetry was translated from Russian in English language by Daniel Weissbort (see Far from Sodom; Arc Publications, 2005) as well as by Archbishop of Canterbury, Rowan Williams (see Headwaters; Perpetua Press, 2008).

== Selected bibliography ==
=== Poetry ===
- Rains and Mirrors; Paris, 1983
- On the Verge of Sleep; Ann Arbor, Ardis, 1985
- Poems (in Russian language); 1991
- Without You; 2004
- Dreams of an Old Eve; 2007

=== Books ===
- Russian: Имя разлуки. Переписка Инны Лиснянской и Елены Макаровой (Name of Goodbye, book in Russian language, collections of correspondence between Lisnyanskaya, from Russia, and her daughter, Elena Makarova, from Israel)

== Awards and honors ==
- Solzhenitsyn Prize
- Russia's Poet Prize
