= Utkin =

Utkin (Russian: Уткин, from утка meaning a duck) is a Russian masculine surname, its feminine counterpart is Utkina. Notable people with the surname include:

- Anatoly Utkin (1943–1975), Soviet serial killer in the late 1960s – early 1970s
- Anton Utkin (born 1967), Russian writer
- Dmitri Utkin (born 1984), Russian ice hockey player
- Dmitry Utkin (1970–2023), cofounder of the Russian mercenary Wagner Group
- Inna Utkina, Soviet pair skater
- Iosif Utkin (1903–1944), Russian poet
- Nikolai Utkin (1780–1863), Russian graphic artist, engraver and illustrator
- Jury Utkin (born 1939), Russian political figure, scientist
- Vasily Utkin (1972–2024), Russian sports reporter
- Vladimir Utkin (1923–2000), Russian scientist and rocket engineer

== See also ==
- 13477 Utkin
- Utkina Dacha in Saint Petersburg, Russia
- Igor Outkine (French-language transliteration of the surname)
