= Friedrich Gorenstein =

Soviet and German author and screenwriter (1932–2002)

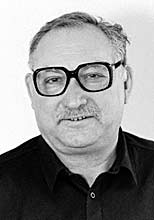
- Friedrich Gorenstein in 1994
- Born: Friedrich Gorenstein; 18 March 1932; Kiev, Soviet Union
- Died: 2 March 2002 (aged 69); Berlin, Germany
- Occupations: Author; screenwriter
- Writing career
- Language: Russian
- Notable works: "Дом с башенкой" (The House with the Tower) (1964); Solaris (1972)

Friedrich Gorenstein (Russian: Фридрих Наумович Горенштейн, romanized: Fridrikh Naumovich Gorenshteyn; 18 March 1932 – 2 March 2002) was a Soviet and German Russian-language author and screenwriter of Ukrainian Jewish decent. His works primarily deal with Stalinism, antisemitism, and the philosophical-religious view of a peaceful coexistence between Jews and Christians.

== Biography ==
Gorenstein was born in a family of Ukrainian Jews: his father, Naum Isaevich Gorenstein (1902—1937), was a professor of political economy. His mother, Enna Abramovna Prilutskaya, was an educator. During the Stalinist repressions, his father was arrested in 1935 and sent to GULAG. He was shot in 1937 after trying to escape. After the arrest of his father, his mother changed Friedrich’s name to (Felix Prilutsky). He later regained his original name. His mother was the director of a home for juvenile offenders in Berdichev, Ukraine. During the Nazi invasion of 1941, he and his mother were evacuated to Orenburg in the Urals. His mother died of tuberculosis in 1943 in Orenburg. Friedrich was placed in an orphanage. After the war, he was raised by his aunts, Zloty and Rachel, in Berdichev.

Following World War II, Gorenstein struggled as an unskilled worker, until Nikita Khrushchev's De-Stalinization allowed him to return to Kiev. He studied mining in Dnipropetrovsk in the 1950s and worked as a miner and mining engineer in the Ural Mountains and Ukraine.

Gorenstein moved to Moscow in 1962 to complete his scenarist course at the State Film University. He began writing screenplays to support himself. Most of his adaptions were censored, but he managed to finish his works, including writing the script for the 1972 science fiction film Solaris, directed by Andrei Tarkovsky. He also wrote books, but none were published except "Дом с башенкой" (The House with the Tower; 1964).

In 1977 Gorenstein released his works through foreign emigration presses to bypass censorship. That and his membership in the forbidden writers union and Almanach Metropol by Vasily Aksyonov got him in trouble with the Soviet government. He received a scholarship from the German Academic Exchange Service and emigrated to West Berlin in 1979, working there as a writer until his death in 2002. His novel Place was nominated for the 1992 Russian Booker Prize.

In 1995 he was a member of the jury at the 19th Moscow International Film Festival.

== Themes ==
Gorenstein's themes reflect the repressive political life he witnessed in Communist Russia. He expressed his belief in a united, peaceful nation with conformity and without totalitarianism and antisemitism. His work The House with the Tower has existentialist themes in the style of Franz Kafka, Albert Camus, and Jean-Paul Sartre. Other works move away from existentialism and incorporate religious themes, particularly Judaism. One example is Berdychev, which recounts the life of a Jew in the pre-WWII Ukraine.

== Selected works ==
- Die Sühne [The Atonement] (in German). Luchterhand. 1979. ISBN 3472864907.
- Gorenstein, Friedrich (1988). Compagnons de Route [Traveling Companions] (in French). L'Age D'Homme. ISBN 2877060047.
- Kim ou l'hiver 53: Nouvelles [Kim, or Winter '53: Novellas]. Editions Gallimard. 1989. ISBN 2070713156.
- Rue Des Aubes Rouges [Street of the Red Dawn] (in French). L'Age D'Homme. 1990. ISBN 2825100595.
- La Place: roman politique tiré de la vie d'un jeune homme [The Place: A political novel from the life of a young man] (in French). L'Age D'Homme. 1991. ISBN 2877061035.
- Psalm: Ein betrachtender Roman über die vier Strafen Gottes [Psalm: A Contemplative Novel About the Four Judgments of God] (in German). Rütten & Loening. 1992. ISBN 3352004420.
- Tschok-Tschok (in Russian). Rütten & Loening. 1993. ISBN 3352004692.
- Skrjabin: Poem der Ekstase; Roman [Skrjabin: Poem of Ecstasy, A Novel]. Aufbau Verlag GmbH. 1994. ISBN 3351022468.
- Malen, wie die Vögel singen: ein Chagall-Roman [Paint, As The Birds Sing: a Chagall novel] (in French). Aufbau Verlag GmbH. 1996. ISBN 3351023634.
- Champagner mit Galle [Champagne With Gall: Stories] (in German). Aufbau Verlag GmbH. 1997. ISBN 3351028342.
- Redemption. The Russian Library. Translated by Andrew Bromfield. Columbia University Press. 2019. ISBN 978-023118515-8.

== Filmography ==
- 1966: Первый учитель (The First Teacher)
- 1972: Нечаянные радости (Unintentional Joy) (unfinished)
- 1972: Solaris
- 1974: The Seventh Bullet (1972 film)
- 1975: Prisoners of Love
- 1976: Раба любви (The Slave of Love)
- 1978: Комедия ошибок (The Comedy of Errors) (TV)
- 1985 (produced in 1991): Infanticide
