= Gnel Medzhlumyan =

Soviet freestyle wrestler (1967–2005)

Personal information
- Born: 3 April 1967 Berd, Armenia
- Died: 30 March 2005 (aged 37) Gegharkunik Province, Armenia
- Weight: 48 kg (106 lb)

Sport
- Sport: Wrestling
- Event: Freestyle
- Coached by: Aram Hakobyan; Razmik Karapetyan
Medal record
Men's freestyle wrestling
Representing the Soviet Union
World Championships
Bronze medal – third place	1989 Martigny	48 kg
European Championships
Gold medal – first place	1989 Ankara	48 kg
World Cup
Gold medal – first place	1990 Toledo	48 kg
Goodwill Games
Silver medal – second place	1990 Seattle	48 kg

Gnel Medzhlumyan (Armenian: Գնել Մեջլումյան; 3 April 1967 – 30 March 2005) was a Soviet Armenian freestyle wrestler. He is a European Champion, World Championships medalist, World Cup winner, and two-time Soviet Champion.

== Biography ==
Medzhlumyan was born on 3 April 1967 in Berd, Armenia. He began to engage freestyle wrestling at the age of ten years under the coaching of Aram Hakobyan. In 1981, he went to study at one of the sport schools of Yerevan, where he was coached by Razmik Karapetyan. He came in first at the 1986 Wrestling World Cup at the espoir level, and in 1987 he was the Espoir World Champion. After moving up to senior, he won the Soviet Championship in 1988 and 1989. Medzhlumyan won the gold medal at the 1989 European Wrestling Championships in Ankara, defeating Turkey's Ilyas Suekrueoglu in the final, and won the bronze medal at the 1989 World Wrestling Championships in Martigny. In 1990, he won the gold medal at the World Cup and the silver medal at the Goodwill Games.

He finished his career in 1992. In 1993, he graduated from the Armenian State Institute of Physical Culture. In the future, he engaged in entrepreneurial activity. On 30 March 2005, Medzhlumyan died in a car accident on the Yerevan-Ijevan highway near the city of Sevan in Gegharkunik Province. He was buried at the cemetery in the Nubarashen District of Yerevan.

In July 2005, the sports school and a street in Berd were named after him. Since 2006, Armenia hold an international youth tournament in freestyle wrestling, dedicated to his memory.
