= Russian Beauty =

Novel by Victor Erofeyev

- Author: Victor Erofeyev
- Original title: Русская красавица
- Genre: Novel
- Publication date: 1990
- Publication place: Russia
- English publication date: 1992 (UK); 1993 (US)
- Media type: Print
- ISBN: 0-67-083606-0
- OCLC: 26395933
- Preceded by: Life with an Idiot
- Followed by: In the Labyrinth of Accursed Questions

Russian Beauty (Russian: Русская красавица) is a novel written by Russian author Victor Erofeyev.

== Publication ==
Russian Beauty was released in Russia in 1990, and then translated into more than 20 languages. It was published in France under the title « La Belle de Moscou » ("Moscow Beauty") in 1991, and in English one year later.

== Summary ==
Beautiful and seemingly perfect Irina Tarakanova relates the story of an erotic odyssey that takes her from a passionate adventure with the father of her unborn child to caring lesbian affairs with her best friend. She tells the story of her life, focusing on her sexuality and erotic experiences in an intensely explicit manner.

== Reception ==
In 1992, the British newspaper The Independent called Erofeyev "the exuberant new iconoclast of Russian literature." Noting the novel's sexual frankness, the paper added, "Victor Erofeyev's book, Russian Beauty, gives new impact to the phrase 'the Russians are coming'."

== In other media ==
The novel was filmed by an Italian producer but was considered by the author as "unsuccessful".
