= Valentin Kurbatov =

Russian writer (1939–2021)

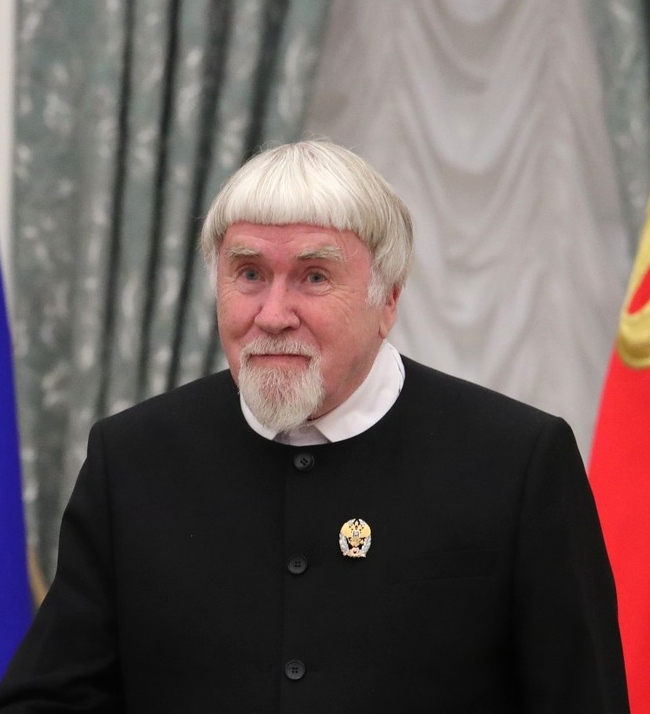
- Born: Валенти́н Я́ковлевич Курба́тов; 29 September 1939; Salvan, Kuybyshev Oblast, Russian SFSR, Soviet Union
- Died: 6 March 2021 (aged 81)
- Citizenship: Russian
- Education: Gerasimov Institute of Cinematography
- Occupations: Writer, Literary critic
- Writing career
- Language: Russian
- Genres: Novel, essay
- Literary movement: Realism

Valentin Yakovlevich Kurbatov (Russian: Валенти́н Я́ковлевич Курба́тов) (29 September 1939 – 6 March 2021) was a Russian literary critic, prose writer, jury member of the Yasnaya Polyana Literary Award, member of the Writers' Union of Russia. He was also member of the Public Chamber of Russia from 2010 to 2014 and member of the Presidential Council for Culture. He was holder of the Medal of Pushkin, Order of Friendship and laureate of the State Prize of the Russian Federation (2020) in the field of literature.

== Biography ==
He was born in the village of Salavan, Kuybyshev Oblast (now Novocheremshansk, Ulyanovsk Oblast) in a family of travel workers. At the beginning of the war, his father was drafted into the labor army in the Urals, and the mother, left alone, became a trackman on the railway. After the war, the family moved to Chusovoy in Perm Krai. After leaving school in 1957, Kurbatov worked as a carpenter at a production plant. In 1959 he was called up to serve in the Soviet Navy. During his naval service in the Russian North he was a radiotelegraph operator, typographer, librarian of the ship's library.

In 1962 he came to Pskov, where he still lived. He worked as a loader at a hosiery factory, then as a proofreader for the regional newspaper "Leninskaya Iskra", a literary employee of the newspaper "Young Leninets". He entered the Faculty of Film Studies at Gerasimov Institute of Cinematography, from which he graduated with honors in 1972. From that time on, he began writing reviews and articles, conducting literary activities and participating in literary events.

In 1978 he was admitted to the Writers' Union. He was a member of the Academy of Russian Literature (Russian: Академия российской словесности) since 1997 and Secretary of the Writers' Union of Russia (1994-1999), member of its board. From 2005 to 2016 he served as member of the Board of the Pskov regional branch of the union. He was a member of the editorial boards of the magazines "Literary Study", "Day and Night", "Russian Province", "Roman-Gazeta", the editorial board of the "Roman-Newspaper XXI Century" magazine, the public council of the "Moscow" magazine.

He was a jury member of the Apollona Grigorieva, Grand Jury of the National Bestseller Award (2001, 2002) as well as a jury member of the Yasnaya Polyana Literary Award.

In March 2014, he signed an appeal by cultural figures of the Russian Federation in support of the policy of the President of Russia, Vladimir Putin in connection with the annexation of Crimea by Russia.
