= Narine Abgaryan =

Armenian prosaist, blogger and writer

- Armenian: Նարինե Աբգարյան
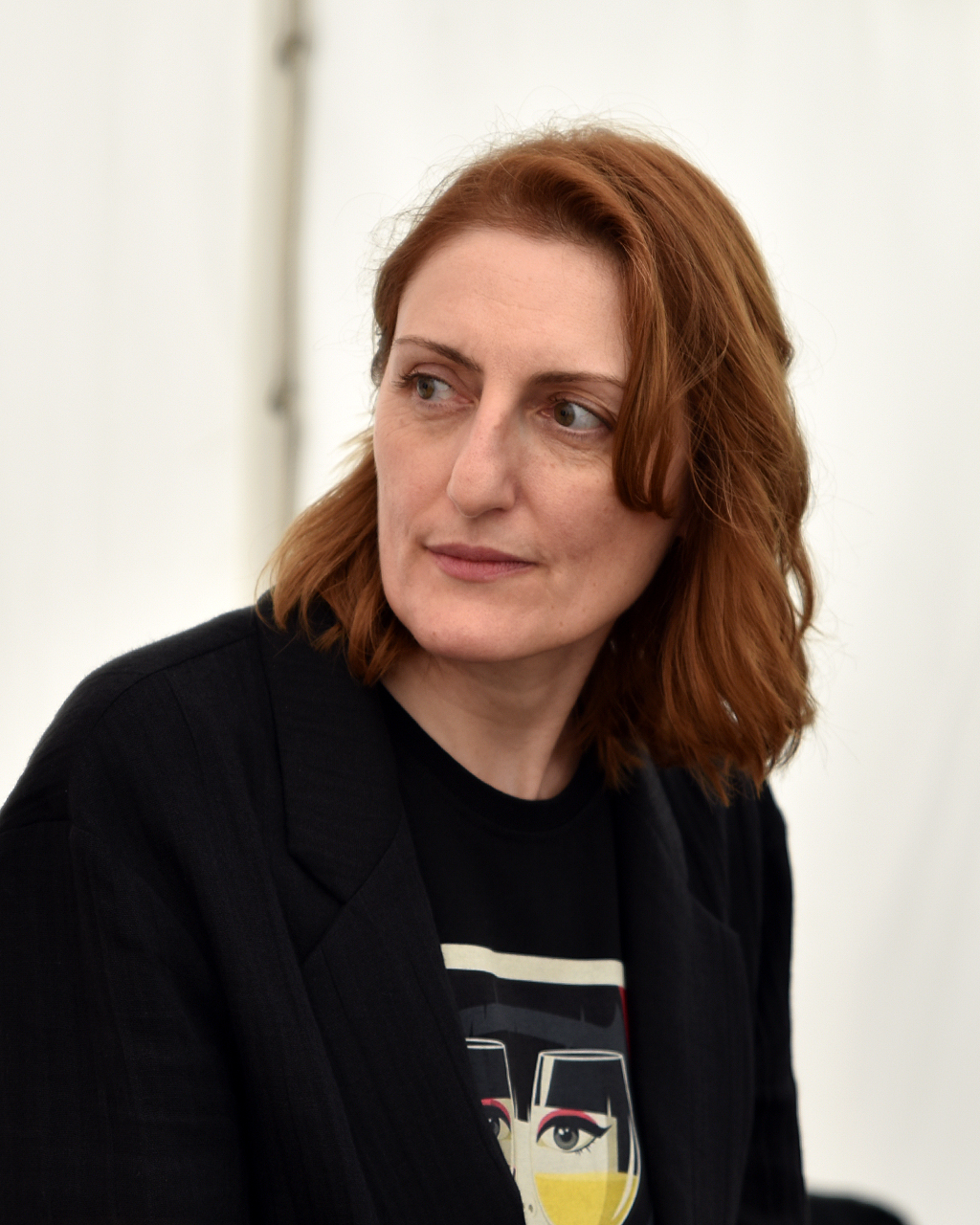
- Narine Abgaryan in 2024
- Born: Narine Abgaryan; 14 January 1971 (age 55); Berd, Armenia, Soviet Union
- Education: Yerevan Brusov University of Languages
- Occupations: Writer, novelist, blogger
- Children: 1
- Writing career
- Period: 2010–present
- Notable works: Manyunya; People Who Are Always With Me; Three Apples Fell from the Sky

Narine Abgaryan (Armenian: Նարինե Յուրիի Աբգարյան, Russian: Наринэ Юрьевна Абгарян; born in Berd, Tavush Province, Armenia on January 14, 1971) is an Armenian writer formerly based in Russia. In 2011, Abgaryan was a nominee of Big Book and Laureate of Yasnaya Polyana Literary Award, Russia, in 2016.

She is the author of Manyunya, People Who Are Always With Me, Three Apples Fell from the Sky, Simon, and others. In 2020, The Guardian named her among the brightest authors of Europe.

== Biography ==
Abgaryan was born in Berd, Tavush Province, Armenia, to a family of a doctor and a teacher. She is the oldest among five children. Her paternal grandfather was an Armenian refugee from Western Armenia, and her grandmother was a native of Eastern Armenia. Her maternal grandfather was also an Armenian, a native of Karabakh, and grandmother was Russian, a native of the Arkhangelsk region of Russia.

In 1988, Abgaryan graduated from high school in Berd, Armenia. She also attended music school where specialized in the piano. In 1993, she graduated from Yerevan Brusov University of Languages. She majored in Russian language and literature teaching. She later moved to Moscow where she worked as an accountant and a seller.

Since 2022 she has been living in Germany.

== Literary life ==
Abgaryan became a blogger on LiveJournal. The stories about a little girl called Manuynya fascinated writer Lara Gall, and she introduced the author to the editor of Astrel-SPb Publishing house. The autobiographical novel Manyunya received The Manuscript of the Year Russian national literary award. Later, the author went on writing a trilogy about the girl called Manyunya. In 2012, Simeon Andreich, Manuscript in Scrawls– was published, illustrated by Victoria Kirdiy. In 2014, Chocolate Granddad was published, co-authored with Valentin Postnikov. It is the only book that she calls a children's book. In August 2015, Abgaryan was named one of two laureates of the Alexander Grin Literature Award "for her outstanding contribution to the national literature development".

In March 2020, her novel Three Apples Fell from the Sky was translated into English by Lisa C. Hayden and published by Oneworld Publications.

In 2025, her novel To Go On Living was translated into English by Margarit Ordukhanyan and Laza Torlone and published by Plough Publishing.

Manyunya was staged by SamArt Youth Theatre, Russia. In 2021, filming for a TV adaptation of Manyunya began, and in 2023, work began on an animated adaptation of Manyunya by Sarik Andreasyan.

== Awards ==
- 2011 – the Manuscript of the Year Award for Manyunya
- 2011 – a nominee for Big Book Award of 2011.
- 2013 – Baby-Нoc Award.
- 2015 – Alexander Grin Russian Literary Award for an outstanding contribution to the development of Russian literature expressed in the creation of a particularly significant literary work, or for the works in general.
- 2016 – Yasnaya Polyana Award in nomination XXI Century for the novel Three Apples Fell from the Sky.

Her collection of short stories "Semyon Andreevich, Chronicle in Scribbles" was named the best children's book of the last decade in Russia.

== Bibliography ==
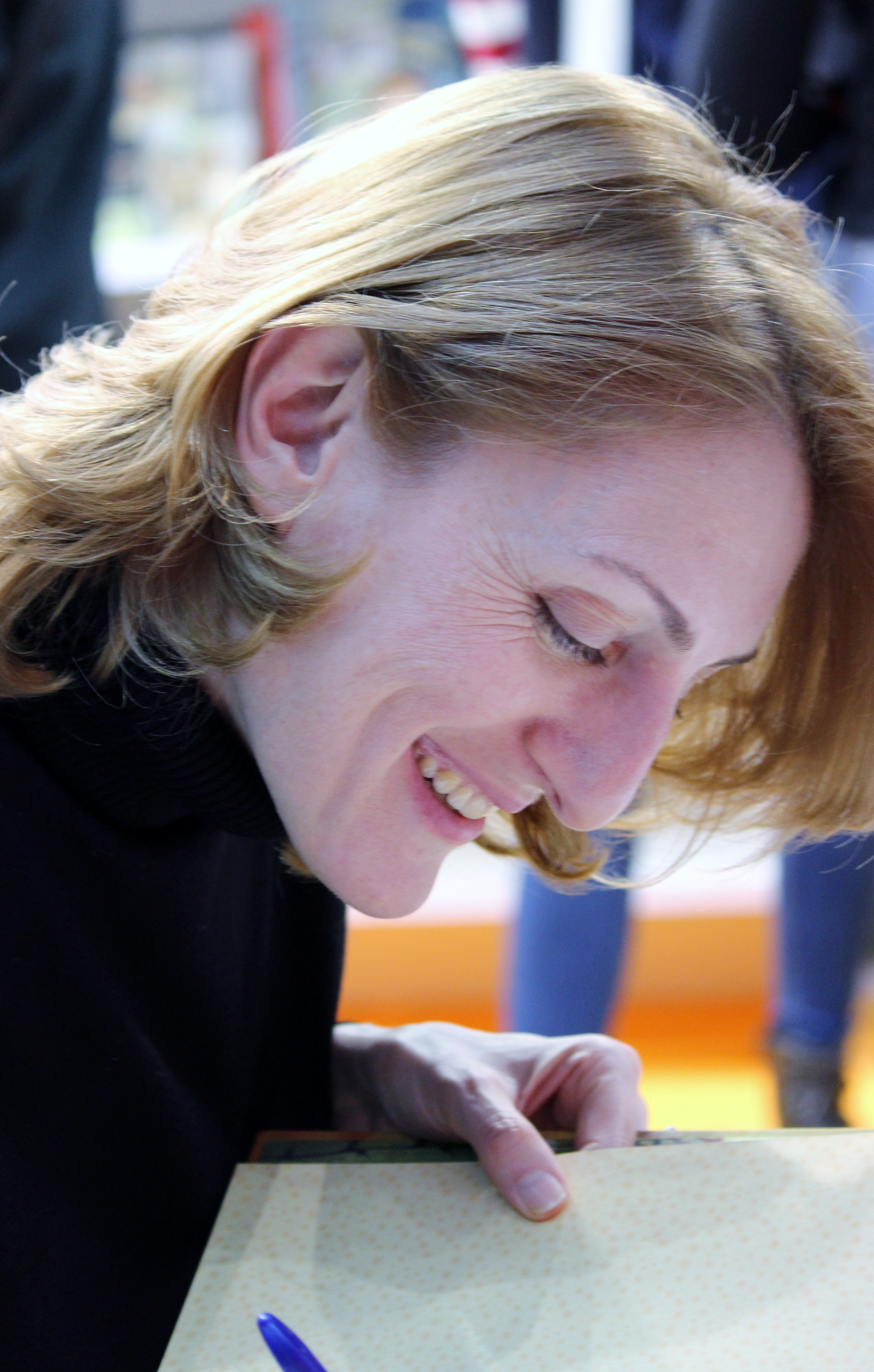
Abgaryan signing books

Her books have been translated into 14 languages.

=== Novels and novellas ===
- 2010 – Manyunya (Russian: Манюня), ISBN 978-5-17-069090-9
- 2011 – Manyunya Writes a Fiction Novel (Russian: Манюня пишет фантастичЫскЫй роман), ISBN 978-5-17-099849-4
- 2011 – A Transplant Girl (Russian: Понаехавшая), novel, ISBN 978-5-17-091170-7
- 2012 – Semyon Andreevich. Chronicle in Scribbles (Russian: Семен Андреич. Летопись в каракулях), ISBN 978-5-17-137112-8
- 2014 – People Who are Always with Me (Russian: Люди, которые всегда со мной), ISBN 978-5-17-083150-0
- 2015 – Three Apples Fell from the Sky (Russian: С неба упали три яблока), ISBN 978-5-17-982776-4
  - Translated into English by Lisa C. Hayden, published by Oneworld Publications, ISBN 978-1-78607-875-9
- 2015 – Mura's Happiness, (Russian: Счастье Муры), ISBN 978-5-17-166245-5
- 2020 – Simon (Russian: Симон), ISBN 978-5-17-127547-1
- 2026 – Sofia Returned Home (Russian: София возвращалась домой), ISBN 978-5-17-174590-5

=== Short story collections ===
- 2012 – Manyunya, Ba's Jubilee and Other Agitations (Russian: Манюня, юбилей Ба и прочие треволнения), ISBN 978-5-17-102190-0
- 2016 – Zulali (Russian: Зулали), ISBN 978-5-17-100511-5
- 2016 – People of Our Yard (Russian: Люди нашего двора), ISBN 978-5-17-134725-3
- 2018 – To Go On Living (Russian: Дальше жить), ISBN 978-5-17-101641-8
  - Translated by Margarit Ordukhanyan and Zara Torlone, published by Plough Publishing House, ISBN 978-1-63608-152-6
- 2022 - The Silence of Color (Russian: Молчание цвета), ISBN 978-5-17-147565-9
