= Yvonne Green =

English poet, translator and barrister (1957–2024)

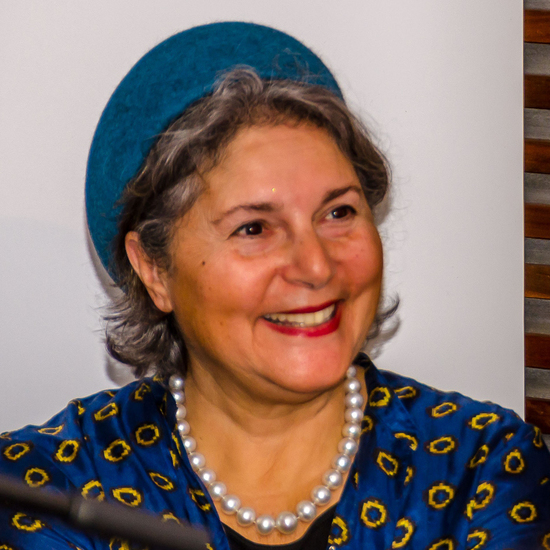
- Born: Yvonne Tamara Bitty Mammon; 8 April 1957 (age 69); Finchley, London, England
- Died: 15 April 2024
- Occupations: Poet, translator, writer, barrister
- Spouse: Brian Green QC
- Children: Charlotte, Jasmine, Bertie, Rachael
- Writing career
- Notable works: Boukhara, After Semyon Izrailevich Lipkin, Selected Poems and Translations, her contribution to The Penguin Book of Russian Poetry, Honoured, Hanisu Yi, Jam & Jerusalem.
- Notable awards: Poetry Business Prizewinner, Buxton Prizewinner, British Poetry Book Society Recommended Translator and Commended Poet
- Website: yvonnegreenpoet.com

Yvonne Green (8 April 1957 – 16 April 2024) was an English poet, translator, writer and barrister.

== Life and career ==
Green (née Mammon) who lived in Hendon and Herzliya, was born in Finchley, north London on April 8, 1957. She was an Orthodox Jew, of Bukharian Jewish ancestry. Her maternal grandparents left the city of Bukhara and settled in Alexandria, Egypt in the early 20th century following the Russian Revolution. They were expelled from Egypt in 1956, and then settled in London, where Yvonne's paternal Bukharian Jewish grandparents had been living; they similarly left Bukhara following the rise of the Soviet Union, but settled in London instead.

She attended the Henrietta Barnett School and then went on to study law at the London School of Economics and Political Science. Green was called to the Bar in New York and England and first practiced in New York at Milbank Tweed Hadley & McCloy and the Legal Aid Society and later in London in the Inner Temple but retired as a commercial barrister in 1999 so she could publish the poetry that she had always written.

Her first pamphlet, Boukhara, was published in 2007 and won The Poetry Business 2007 Book & Pamphlet Competition. Her first full-length collection, The Assay was published in 2010 and as a result of an award from Celia Atkin and Lord Gavron was translated into Hebrew in 2013, under the title HaNisuyi and published in Israel by Am Oved. Honoured, her most recent work has "telling detail and great emotional power" according to Alan Brownjohn. In Honoured, Green juxtaposes the idealized vision of Israel with the Zionist narrative of the diaspora. Green was Poet-in-Residence to Spiro's Ark from 2000 to 2003, Norwood Ravenswood in 2006, Casa Shalom from 2007 to 2008, Jewish Woman's Aid from 2007 to 2009 and from 2013, to Baroness Scotland of Asthall's Global Foundation To End Domestic Violence (EDV GF).

After the November 2015 Paris attacks Green read translations from Hebrew as well as some of her own work at a Poetry and Music of the Middle East event in St Albans. On 6 June 2016 Green's poem, "The Farhud: Baghdad's Shabu'ot 1st and 2nd June 1941", was read in the Israeli Knesset to commemorate the Farhud. On 3 July 2017 Green read out Bejan Matur's poems at "The Kurdish Sisterhood" event organised by the Exiled Lit Cafe at the Poetry Café. She convened two monthly groups, one at Hendon Library called "Wall of Words" and the second at JW3, Europe's largest Jewish cultural centre, called "Taking the Temperature". She also regularly gave readings and talks on translating Semyon Lipkin.

== Death ==
Green died on April 15, 2024, after a battle with leukemia. She was buried in Petach Tikva, Israel.

== Awards and honours ==
- 2007 The Poetry Business' Book & Pamphlet Prizewinner for Boukhara
- Winter 2011 Poetry Book Society Recommended Translation Award for After Semyon Izrailevich Lipkin
- 2012 Buxton prize Commendation for Welcome to Britain

== Published works ==
=== Poetry collections ===
- The Assay (Smith|Doorstop, 2010) ISBN 978-1-906613-17-4
- Selected Poems and Translations (Smith|Doorstop, 2014) ISBN 978-1-910367-12-4
- Honoured (Smith|Doorstop, 2015) ISBN 978-1-910367-56-8
- Jam & Jerusalem (Smith|Doorstop, 2018) ISBN 978-1-910367-95-7

=== Translations ===
==== From Russian ====
- After Semyon Izrailevich Lipkin (Smith/Doorstop, 2011) ISBN 978-1-906613-38-9
- By the Sea After Semyon Lipkin (The Penguin Book of Russian Poetry) ISBN 978-0-141-19830-9
- Testimony from the literary memoirs of Semyon Izrailevich Lipkin (Hendon Press, 2023) ISBN 978-1-739778-51-4
- A Close Reading of Fifty-three poems by Semyon Izrailevich Lipkin (Hendon Press, 2023) ISBN 978-1-739778-52-1

==== From Punjabi ====
- Mangoes After Amarjit Chandan (Brittle Star) Autumn 2005

=== Pamphlets and limited editions ===
- Boukhara (Smith/Doorstop Books, 2007) ISBN 978-1-906613-01-3

=== Published periodicals ===
- The Berber Women (Jewish Quarterly) Winter 2001/2
- Memory of Milk, Stormy Night (The Wolf) Autumn 2002
- Souriya, Basmati, Our Food (Areté) Winter 2002 ISBN 0904-241-661 and (Petits Propos Culinaires 74) December 2003
- Souriya (PEN International) Volume 53, No 2, 2003
- Letter from Shushan (Jewish Renaissance) Autumn 2003 and (The Wolf) Spring 2004
- There is a Boat (Poetry Review) Autumn 2003 ISBN 1-900-771-365
- Shoe Shopping (Interpreter's House) October 2003
- Taking The Bride to the Henna Night (Modern Poetry in Translation) Series 3 No.2 2004 and The Haaretz Poem of the Week 27 January 2015
- The Prayer, Looking at the Crib (Second Light Publications 16) 2004
- Basmati (Sephardi Bulletin) April 2004
- The Cemetery at St. Martin (European Judaism) Spring 2004
- There's A Different History (Petits Propos Culinaires 77) December 2004
- My Fathers Room (London Magazine) April/May 2005
- Our Food (Sameah) Spring 2005
- Slowly The Air (Magma) Winter 2005
- I Didn't Really Realise (Jewish Women's Aid News) November 2005
- As Well As I Can (Norwood/Ravenswood's Annual Publication) November 2006
- Without Your Jews (Bevis Marks Synagogue's 350th Anniversary Publication) December 2006 and (PN Review) 178 volume 34 No 2 Nov/Dec 2007
- Mother Me Always (St. Nicholas Church, Idbury Publication) March 2007
- She Can't Believe What Happens (Jewish Women's Aid News) August 2007
- The Éboule (At Home) (Cimarron Review) Winter 2007
- And For Years Later, After You're Free (Jewish Women's Aid Annual Publication) 2008
- Originating Summons (The Casa Shalom Journal of the Institute for Marrano-Anusim Studies) Volume 10 2008
- Advice (The Legal Studies Forum) Volume XXXII, No.1, 2008
- A Lawyer's Poem (PN Review) 181, Volume 34 No. 5 May/Jun 2008
- Ghetto Blaster, That I May Know You (The North) 2008 and (Statement for the Prosecution Anthology) 2005 ISBN 1-904662-03-X
- War Poem, Silent Blessing, How To Beat Your Wife (Cardinal Points) Volume 3 2011
- That Kind of War, Truce (Peace One Day Global Truce Publication) Autumn 2012
- Joker (Miracle) February 2014
- Jews (The North) Autumn 2014
- Year (Gold Dust) 2014
- All Artist (Brittle Star) Issue 34 2014
- Jews, Our Food, My Fathers Room (And Other Poems) January 2015
- The Poetry of Propaganda (London Grip New Poetry) Spring 2015
- Dumb (Jewish Quarterly) Spring 2015
- The Poetry of Propaganda (Jewish Renaissance Magazine) April 2015 page 51
- The Silk Routes, 9/6/20 & A Conversation With Ruth Padel (Issue 66 The North) August 2021
- Heritage Sites (Leeds Poetry Festival Prize Anthology) July 2022
- Farouk (London Magazine) December 2022
- Your Name’s Never Mentioned (Poetry Scotland Issue 105) March 2023
- Believe Me (Acumen Magazine Issue 106) May 2023
- Alexandria, Tetrissed, The Time was Brutal and Kaleidoscope (The North Issue 69) August 2023
- The Sound and Vision of a Noiseless Poet (Acumen Magazine Issue 109) May 2024

=== Translated publications ===
Three of her poems were published in translation in the Summer 2006 edition of Dimui (Beit Moreshet B'Yerushalayim), Out of the Ordinary, Bibi and Souriya.
A grant from Celia Atkin and Lord Gavron enabled Green's "The Assay" to be translated into Hebrew. They were then published in Israel by Am Oved under the title HaNisuyi (הניסוי) ISBN 978-965-13-2356-0

=== Writings ===
==== A conversation with Louise Glück ====
Louise Glück gave a rare interview to Green which was published in PN Review 196 in December 2010.

==== Reviews ====
Green has reviewed the works of other poets. She has reviewed Daniel Weissbort in the April/May 2007 edition of the London Magazine.

==== Gaza reporting ====
In 2008 Green wrote "Reflections on a Visit to Shderot" that appeared on the Freedom in a Puritan Age website. Five days after Operation Cast Lead, Green entered the Gaza Strip to see the situation for herself after hearing the media reports throughout the war. She then wrote a number of pieces from her experience. She wrote a report entitled "A Verbatim Note on a Visit to Gaza". Green also wrote an op-ed article entitled "Puzzled in Gaza" that featured in The Jerusalem Post and the Boston Globe where she stated, "What I saw was that there had been precision attacks made on all of Hamas's infrastructure…most of Gaza…was visibly intact." Green also had was also interviewed by The Jewish Chronicle and Bridges for Peace about her experiences.

== Radio features ==
- The Food Programme – BBC Radio 4
- Woman's Hour – BBC Radio 4
- Poetry Please – BBC Radio 4
- Bridges for Peace Interview

== Readings and events ==
- Taking The Temperature is a monthly group at JW3 that Green organises. She was in conversation there with Maureen Kendler on 10 February 2015 and on 23 March 2015 with Sean O'Brien. The group has an audience of readers and writers including Alan Brownjohn, Elaine Feinstein, Deborah Sacks and June Lausch.
- Reading at the Pushkin House Russian Poetry Week
- 2007 Reading at StAnza
- 2008 Poets on Fire reading
- 2009 Talks on Gaza and Sderot
- 2009 Reading of her translation of Yehuda Amichai's notes for unfinished poems
- 2010 Russian Translations reading at The Troubadour
- 2010 Poetry at The Troubadour
- 2012 Reading for the Exiled Writers Ink
- 2012 Reading at the Buxton Poetry Competition
- 2014 Reading at the Jewish Museum
- 2016 Reading of her poem "The Farhud: Baghdad's Shabu'ot 1st and 2nd June 1941" which was commissioned by Harif to mark the 75th anniversary of The Farhud
- 2016 Featured poet at the Poetry Salon in The Master's House in Ledbury

== See also ==
- Volume 22 Part 1 Translation and Literature Spring 2013 (Article by Donald Rayfield)
- Poetry Review (Volume 101:1 Spring 2011)
- PBS Bulletin (Winter 2011) (Review of After Semyon Izrailevich Lipkin)
- Frances Spurrier reviews The Assay by Yvonne Green
- London Grip review of After Semyon Izrailevich Lipkin
- Featured poet for Holocaust Memorial Day 2015 in Haaretz by Vivian Eden (Poem of The Week)
- London Grip review of Honoured
