= Leonid Borodin =

Russian writer (1938–2011)

- Леонид Иванович Бородин
- Born: April 14, 1938; Irkutsk
- Died: November 24, 2011 (aged 73); Moscow
- Citizenship: Soviet Union (1938–1991) → Russian Federation (1991–2011)
- Education: Irkutsk State University, Buryat State University
- Occupations: writer, poet, member of All-Russian Social-Christian Union for the Liberation of the People, Civic Chamber of the Russian Federation
- Writing career
- Notable awards: Solzhenitsyn Prize, Yasnaya Polyana Literary Award

Leonid Ivanovich Borodin (Russian: Леони́д Ива́нович Бороди́н; 14 April 1938 – 24 November 2011) was a Russian novelist and journalist.

== Biography ==
Born in Irkutsk, Borodin was a Russian Orthodox Christian and a Soviet dissident. In the 1960s he belonged to the anti-Communist All-Russian Social-Christian Union for the Liberation of the People (VSHSON).who were put on trial in 1968. He was arrested and imprisoned in the 'strict regime' Camp 17 in 1968, and went on hunger strike there with Yuli Daniel and Aleksandr Ginzburg in 1969.

After his release in 1973, Borodin’s works were smuggled out of the Soviet Union. The publication of an English translation of The Story of a Strange Time led to his arrest in 1982 on charges of 'anti-Soviet propaganda'. He was sentenced to 10 years of hard labour in Perm-36 Maximum Security Camp (ITK-6), as well as five years' internal exile. Released after four years, in the perestroika era, Borodin was allowed to visit the West with his wife.

Borodin was the subject and first-person narrator of the 2001 film Leonid Borodin: Looking through the Years.

A winner of many literary prizes, including the 2002 Solzhenitsyn Prize, Borodin was editor-in-chief of Moskva, a popular literary magazine. In 2005 he was appointed to the first convocation of the Public Chamber of Russia.

== Works in English translation ==
- Partings, The Harvill Press, 1988.
- The Year of Miracle and Grief, Quartet Books, 1988.
- The Third Truth, Harpercollins, 1992.
- The Story of a Strange Time, Harpercollins, 1993.
