= Union of Soviet Writers =

1934–1991 creative union of professional writers in the Soviet Union

The Union of Soviet Writers, USSR Union of Writers, or Soviet Union of Writers (Russian: Союз писателей СССР, romanized: Soyuz pisatelei SSSR) was a creative union of professional writers in the Soviet Union. It was founded in 1934 on the initiative of the Central Committee of the Communist Party (1932) after disbanding a number of other writers' organizations, including Proletkult and the Russian Association of Proletarian Writers.

The aim of the Union was to achieve party and state control in the field of literature. For professional writers, membership of the Union became effectively obligatory, and non-members had much more limited opportunities for publication. The result was that exclusion from the Union meant a virtual ban on publication. However, the history of the Union of Writers also saw cases of voluntary self-exclusion from its cadre. Thus, Vasily Aksyonov, Semyon Lipkin, and Inna Lisnyanskaya left the Union of Writers in a show of solidarity after the exclusion of Viktor Yerofeyev and Yevgeny Popov in punishment for self-publishing.

Andrei Zhdanov gave the opening address to the First Congress of Soviet Writers in August 1934, stating the "tendentious" purpose of literature as forming Marxist ideology in the minds of Soviets and illustrating the centrality of ideologically-pure literature to the Soviet and Stalinist project:

Our Soviet literature is not afraid of the charge of being "tendentious". Yes, Soviet literature is tendentious, for in an epoch of class struggle there is not and cannot be a literature which is not class literature, not tendentious, allegedly non-political.

After the end of the Soviet Union, the Union of Soviet Writers was divided into separate organizations for each of the post-Soviet states. The Russian section was transformed into the Union of Russian Writers.

== Chairmen ==
The post of chairman of the Union of Writers has been held by:

- Maxim Gorky (1934–1936)
- Vladimir Stavsky (1936–1938)
- Alexander Fadeyev (1938–1944 and 1946–1954)
- Nikolai Tikhonov (1944–1946)
- Alexey Surkov (1954–1959)
- Konstantin Fedin (1959–1977)
- Georgi Markov (1977–1986)
- Vladimir Karpov (1986–1991)

== Publication ==
From January 1946 to December 1990 the Union published a journal titled Soviet Literature Monthly. The title was later shortened to Soviet Literature. The journal published translations of Soviet literature. It was issued in English, French, German, Spanish, Hungarian, Polish, Czech, and Slovak editions.

== See also ==
- First Congress of Soviet Writers
- List of Russian-language writers
