= Yevgeni Anatolyevich Popov =

Russian writer (born 1946)

Yevgeni Popov
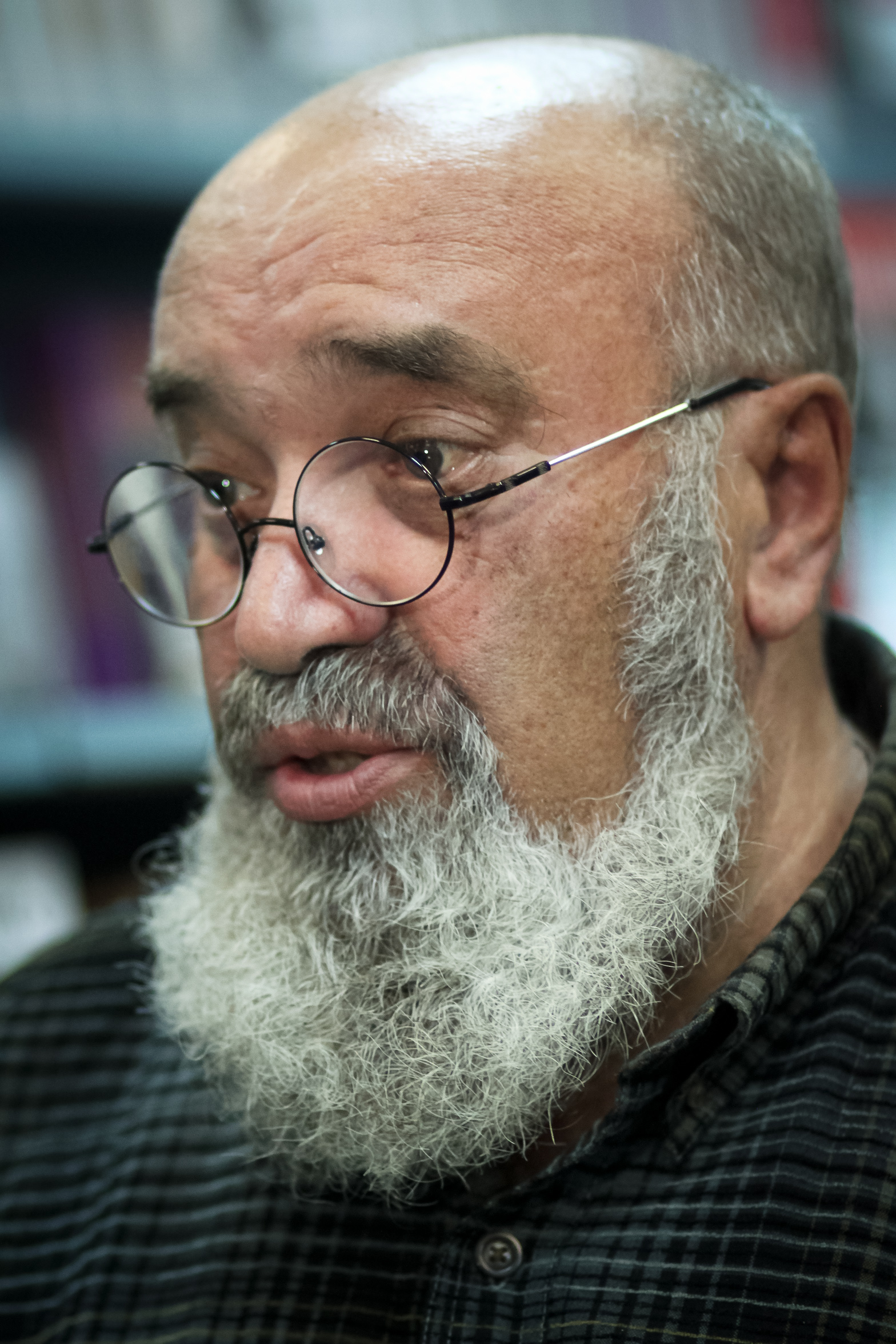
- Yevgeni Popov (2011)
- Born: Yevgeni Anatolyevich Popov; 1946 (age 79–80); Krasnoyarsk, USSR
- Occupation: Writer
- Writing career
- Genres: Novel, short story, essay
- Literary movement: Postmodernism

Yevgeni Anatolyevich Popov (Евгений Анатольевич Попов) (born Krasnoyarsk, 1946) is a Russian writer, best known for short stories.

== Biography ==
He published his first story in 1962. That same year, he was expelled from the Komsomol for his participation in samizdat activities.

In 1968, he graduated from the Russian State Geological Prospecting University and worked as a geologist in the northeast. While there, he wrote numerous stories, many inspired by the interesting characters he encountered. His first professional recognition came in 1976, when one of his stories was published in Novy Mir, with a foreword by Vasily Shukshin. In 1978, he was admitted to the Union of Soviet Writers, but was expelled seven months later for his role in creating Metropol', an uncensored almanac that was published outside the USSR.

He found himself in trouble again in 1980, when he came under scrutiny by the KGB for helping to produce a similar almanac called Catalog, which was published in the United States. His membership in the Writers Union was restored in 1988, during the period of Glasnost. His stories began to be published in large numbers in the 1990s; he has also written numerous novels considered to be in the metafiction tradition. He makes use of elements of fairy tale construction and literary parody. He is currently the secretary of the Union of Moscow Writers and is one of the founders of the Russian PEN Center.

Since the early 2000s he has been an active internet blogger on Live Journal and a vocal critic of Vladimir Putin's government. In 2016 he became Chairman of the Jury Fazil Iskander International Literary Award

== Bibliography ==
=== Novels ===
- Dusha patriota, ili razlichnye poslaniia Ferfichkinu (The Soul of the Patriot) [1989]. Moscow: Tekst, 1985. Translated into English as The Soul of a Patriot or Various Epistles to Ferfichkin, trans. Robert Porter (Harvill: London, 1994).
- Prekrasnost’ zhizni. Glavy iz ‘romana s gazetoi’, kotoryi nikogda ne budet nachat i zakonchen (The Splendour of Life. Chapters from a 'love-affair with a newspaper' which will never be started or finished) (Moscow: Rabochii, 1990).
- Nakanune nakanune (On the Eve of the Eve), Volga, 4 (1993), 3-62.
- Podlinnaia istoriia "zelenikh muzykantov", roman-kommentarii (The Real Story of the 'Green Musicians: a Novel-Commentary) [Znamia, 6 (1998), 10-110], (Moscow: Vagrius, 1999).
- Master Khaos. Otkrytaia mul’tiagentnaia literaturnaia sistema s poslesloviem uchënogo cheloveka, (Master Chaos. An open multi-agent literary system with a postscript by a scholarly person) Oktiabr’, 4 (2002), 3-111.
- Arbeit. Shirokoe polotno (Arbeit: A Broad Canvas) (Moscow: Astrel', 2012).

=== Short story collections ===
- Veselie Rusi (Merry-making in Old Russia) (Ann Arbor, Michigan: Ardis, 1981).
- Zhdu liubvi ne verolomnoi (I Await a Love That's True)(Moscow: Sovetskií Pisatel’, 1989).
- Samolët na Kël’n (The Plane to Cologne) (Moscow: Orbita, 1991).
