= Metropol (almanac) =

1978 Russian literary almanac

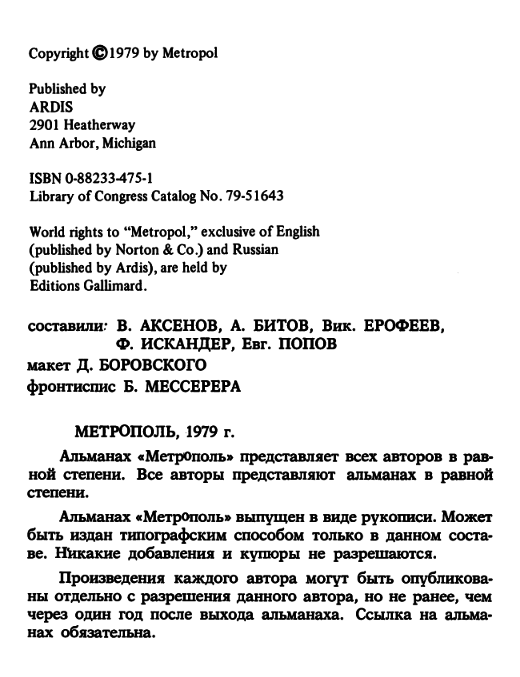
Metropoli Literary Almanac M, Ann Arbor Ardis, 1979

The Metropol' Almanac is a collection of uncensored texts by famous writers, self published in Samizdat in Moscow in December 1978.. The collection was organized by Vasily Aksyonov, and counted with contributions from a number of Soviet writers, such as Fazil Iskander, Andrei Bitov, Andrei Voznesensky, Bella Akhmadulina and Vladimir Vysotsky, and one contribution from abroad, made by John Updike.

Copies of the almanac was smuggled to the US, and a facsimile edition was published in 1979 by Ardis Publishing. A translation to English was published by Random House, while one in French was prepared by Gallimard.

== History of the Almanac ==
=== Creation of the Metropol' Almanac ===
The essence of the project was to place in a collection of works rejected by Soviet publishers. Not all poets and prose writers approached by the compilers of "Metropol" agreed to transfer their poems and prose to the almanac; for example, Yuri Trifonov and Bulat Okudzhava refused to participate for various reasons. Vysotsky, according to the memoirs of Vasily Aksyonov, treated the proposal "with enthusiasm" and transferred a large selection of poems for publication. John Updike sent a chapter of his new novel.

The direct work on compiling the almanac took place in the apartment that previously belonged to Aksyonov's mother, Evgenia Ginzburg, who died shortly before the publication of "Metropol". Enthusiasts and volunteer assistants worked there, retyping texts, gluing together typewritten sheets, and proofreading. The layout was designed by the theater artist David Borovsky, and the frontispiece was designed by Boris Messerer. Vysotsky did not take direct part in the work on the almanac, but sometimes he came to the “editorial office” with a guitar, asking a humorous question upon entering the apartment: “Do they make counterfeit money here?”.

The authors of the Metropol' planned a small vernissage to mark the release of the work. They also openly discussed publishing the work abroad, sending a letter asking for permission from VAAP, the Soviet agency in charge of negotiating copyright for authors publishing abroad.

=== Prohibition of the Almanac and persecution of the authors ===
Five of the Metropol' authors were invited to the Writers' Union in an attempt to dissuade from organizing the Vernissage. When that did not work, the Rhythm Cafe, where it would take place, was closed for a sanitary inspection on the say of the Vernissage.

After the almanac was made public, its authors were subjected to various forms of persecution in the USSR. A media campaign called the works "vulgar", "low quality" and "pornographic", and was led in magazines by 1st Secretary of the Moscow organization of the Union of Writers of the USSR Felix Kuznetsov. Evgeny Popov and Viktor Yerofeyev, who had applied to the Writers Union of the U.S.S.R., were denied membership. After this, Inna Lisnyanskaya, Vasily Aksyonov and Semyon Lipkin all renounced their memberships. At the time, this meant "literary death", as the authors put, threatening their ability to publish, but also housing, since they lived in apartments provided by the Union. Vassili Aksyonov emigrating from the USSR in result.

A fictionalized history of the almanac "Metropol" is contained in the novels of Vasily Aksenov "Say Raisin" and "Mysterious Passion".

=== Publication abroad ===
The Metropol' manuscript was smuggled abroad by several acquaintances of the writers. Kevin Klose, an american journalist then in the USSR, sent a copy to Carl Proffer, publisher of Ardis Publishing in Ann Arbor, Michigan, who made a fac-simile edition. After the Metropol' publication, the Proffers had their visas denied for the USSR, which they had been visiting once a year since the sixties. They attributed that to two publications, Lev Kopelev's To Preserve Forever, and Metropol'.

== List of contributors ==
- Bella Akhmadulina
- Vasily Aksyonov
- Yuz Aleshkovsky
- Arkady Arkanov
- Leonid Baktin
- Andrei Bitov
- Boris Bakhtin
- Friedrich Gorenstein
- Fazil Iskander
- Yuri Karabchievsky
- Piotr Kozhevnikov
- Semyon Lipkin
- Inna Lisianskaya
- Evgeny Popov
- Vassily Rakitin
- Evgeny Rein
- Mark Rozovsky
- Genrih Saprig
- Viktor Trostnikov
- Vladimir Vysotsky
- Andrei Voznessensky
- John Updike
- Viktor Yerofeyev
