= Viktor Yerofeyev =

Russian writer (born 1947)

Viktor Vladimirovich Yerofeyev
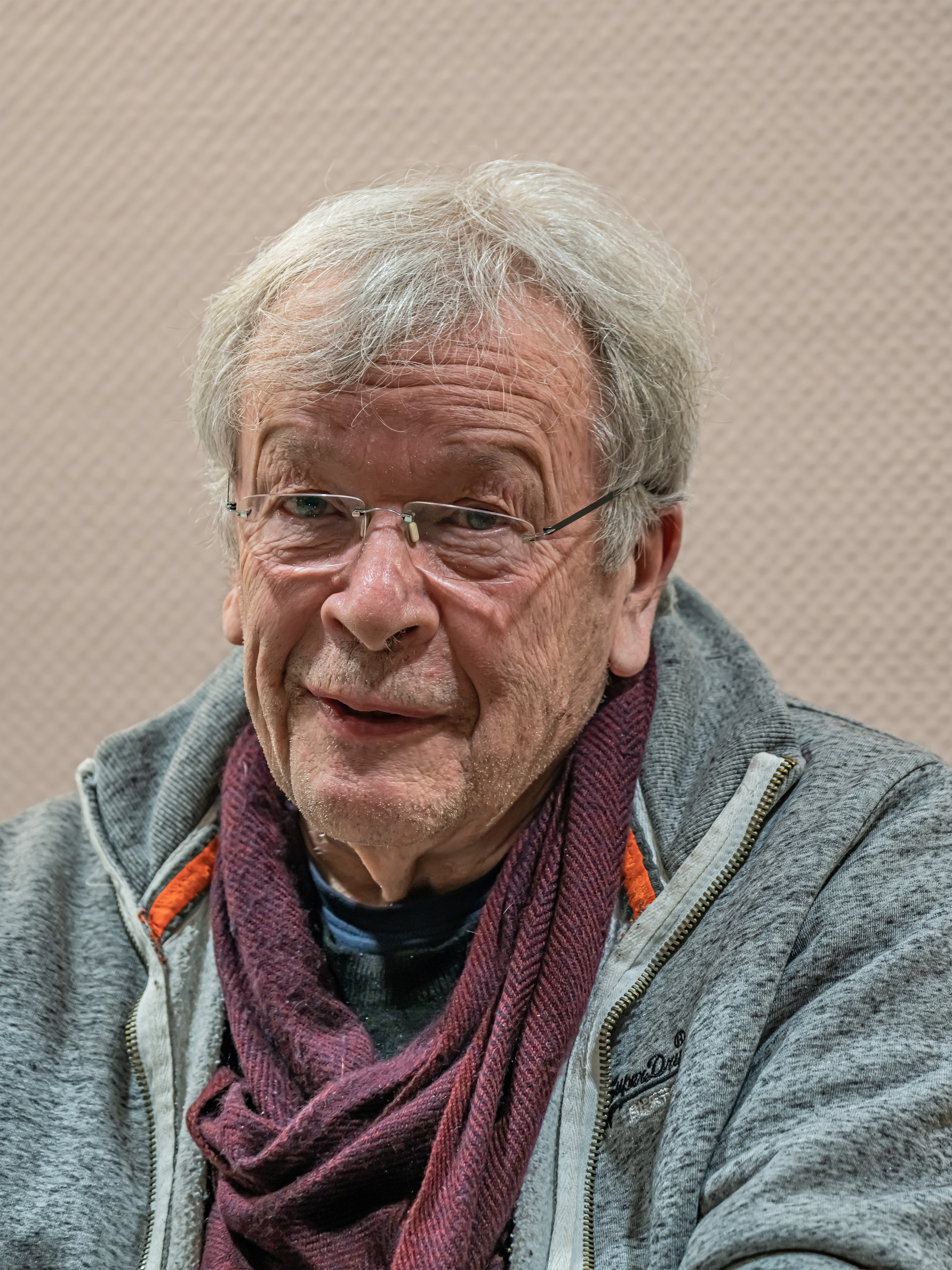
- Born: 19 September 1947 (age 79); Moscow, Russian SFSR, Soviet Union
- Education: Moscow State University

Viktor Vladimirovich Yerofeyev (Russian: Ви́ктор Влади́мирович Ерофе́ев, also transliterated as Erofeyev; born 19 September 1947 in Moscow) is a Russian writer. After the Russian invasion of Ukraine he fled to Germany.

== Early life and education ==
As son of a high-ranking Soviet diplomat Vladimir Yerofeyev, he spent some of his childhood in Paris, which accounts for why much of his work has been translated from Russian into French, while comparatively little has been translated into English. His father, who was the interpreter for Stalin in the late 1940s, wrote a book of memories; his brother is a curator at the Tretyakov Gallery.

Erofeyev graduated from Moscow State University in 1970, where he studied literature and languages. He then did post-graduate work at the Institute for World Literature in Moscow, where he completed his post-graduate work in 1973 and received his kandidat degree in 1975 for his thesis on Fyodor Dostoyevsky and French existentialism. Erofeyev's work often contains pastiches of Dostoyevsky's work and themes.

== Career, 1975–2022 ==
Erofeyev became a literary critic, publishing works on Lev Shestov and the Marquis de Sade. He later organised his own literary magazine, Metropol', in which many of the big names of Soviet literature participated, including Vasily Aksyonov, Andrei Bitov, Bella Akhmadulina, and others. The magazine was put into circulation via samizdat, i.e., avoiding Soviet censorship. As a result, Erofeyev was expelled from the Union of Soviet Writers and was banned from being published until 1988, when Mikhail Gorbachev came to power.

He resided in Moscow until 2022 and frequently appeared on Russian television, where he had his own program on the TV channel «Kultura» ("culture"); he was also a regular guest on Radio Liberty, Moscow.

== Exile, 2022–present ==
Following the Russian invasion of Ukraine in 2022, he and his family fled Russia to settle in Germany.

== In the media ==
Alfred Schnittke's opera Life with an Idiot is based on Erofeyev‘s 1980 story of the same name, which he made into a libretto for the composer.

The 2012 Finnish documentary movie "Russian Libertine" is centered on Victor Erofeyev and his view of the protests leading up to the 2012 Russian Presidential election.

In October 2013, Victor Erofeyev received the Chevalier of Legion of Honour title from the French Government.

== Major works ==
- Life with an Idiot («Жизнь с идиотом»; a collection of short stories; 1980), translated by Andrew Reynolds, first published by Penguin in English in 2004. ISBN 0-14-023621-X
- Russian Beauty («Русская красавица»; 1990)
- In the Labyrinth of Accursed Questions («В лабиринте проклятых вопросов»; a collection of essays; 1996)
- The Last Judgement («Страшный суд»; 1996)
- Five Rivers of Life («Пять рек жизни»; 1998)
- Encyclopaedia of the Russian Soul («Энциклопедия русской души»; 1999)
- Men («Мужчины»; 1997; in Russian) and God X («Бог X. Рассказы о любви»; 2001)
- The Good Stalin («Хороший Сталин»; 2004), autobiographical novel ISBN 1782671110
- Nacktes Russland (2023)
- Der große Gopnik (2023)

=== Journalism ===
Erofeyev regularly contributes to The Times Literary Supplement, The New Yorker, The New York Review of Books, and The International Herald Tribune. In Germany, he is published by the Frankfurter Allgemeine and Die Welt.

== Bibliography ==
- "INTERVIEW about Russian Beauty/ How was it for you?: Dina Rabinovitch meets Victor". The Independent. 14 August 1992.
- Viktor Jerofejew (13 February 2007). "Rüstung: Putins Russland hat ein Image-Problem". Die Welt (in German).
- "Yerofeyev: 'Free speech in Russia still under threat'". DW. 11 August 2018.
- Sabine Adler (18 June 2023). "Autor Viktor Jerofejew - Wie geht es weiter mit Russland?". DLF (in German).
- Andrew Reynolds, "East is East...? Victor Erofeyev and the Poetics/Politics of Idiocy."
