= Yasnaya Polyana Literary Award =

Russian literary award

- Logo
- Awarded for: the best traditional-style novel
- Country: Russia
- Presented by: Yasnaya Polyana, Samsung Group
- Reward: 6.7 million RUB
- First award: 2003
- Website: yppremia.ru

The Yasnaya Polyana Literary Award is an annual all-Russian literary award that was founded in 2003 by the Leo Tolstoy Museum Estate and Samsung Electronics. It is presented to the best traditional-style novel written in Russian or translated into Russian.

The award maintains classical literature traditions by commemorating the authors of outstanding works and also supports contemporary literarure by noting talented writers. These two aspects allow the award to remain balanced and harmonious.

As of 2024, the award categories are:

- Modern Russian Prose
- Foreign Fiction
- New Adult / Youth
- Personality of the Year
- Missed Masterpiece
- Readers' Choice
- Yasnaya Polyana School of Criticism Review

Modern Russian Prose and Foreign Fiction are considered the two most esteemed categories by the award maker. Most of the categories go through multiple stages of decision, including a longlist and shortlist by a jury. The Readers' Choice is determined by popular vote online.

== Background ==
Originally, until 2005, there were only two categories: an Outstanding Work of Russian Fiction and an Outstanding Debut in Russian Fiction. These were renamed Contemporary Classic and 21st Century, respectively. In 2012 (the award's 10-year anniversary), another category was added to the award – Childhood, Boyhood, Youth, named after Leo Tolstoy's semi-autobiographical trilogy of novels.

A fourth category, Foreign Fiction, was added in 2015, and the fifth, Readers' Choice, in 2016. In 2017, Contemporary Classic was renamed Contemporary Russian Fiction, the Event category was added, and Childhood, Boyhood, Youth abandoned. Notably, 21st Century was never provided again.

The award's fund doubled since 2010. Currently, it amounts to 6,700,000 ₽, making it the largest endowment of any literary award in Russia. The Readers' Choice winner is awarded with a theme trip to South Korea, presented by Samsung. All winners receive a special statuette.

=== Recent years ===
In October 2023, the jury announced the winners of the 21st awards, renaming Event to Personality of the Year, and adding a category for Missed Masterpiece, meaning a work that flew under Russian critics' radar until a recent translation made it more notable. The monetary fund of 6,700,000 ₽ was distributed to the honorees:

- the winner of the Modern Russian Prose award receives 3,000,000 ₽, while 1,000,000 ₽ is divided between the finalists.
- a sum of 1,200,000 ₽ goes to the Foreign Fiction laureate, while the work's translator gets 500,000 ₽.
- another 250,000 ₽ is given to the Personality of the Year.
- the remaining 250,000 ₽ goes to the translator of the Missed Masterpiece.
- the Readers' Choice winner is awarded with a theme trip to South Korea, presented by Samsung.

In October 2024 the jury announced the winners of the 22nd awards. Leonid Yuzefovich won the Modern Russian Prose category for his novella Pokhod na Bar-Khoto and Juhea Kim won Foreign Fiction for Beasts of a Little Land, translated by Kirill Batygin. A category called "Youth" for books aimed at young adults was added that year. The longlists and shortlists were announced between May and September 2024. The monetary fund of 6,700,000 ₽ was distributed to the honorees:

- the winner of the Modern Russian Prose award receives 3,000,000 ₽, while 1,000,000 ₽ is divided between the finalists.
- a sum of 1,200,000 ₽ goes to the Foreign Fiction laureate, while the work's translator gets 500,000 ₽.
- the winner of New Adult / Youth gets 400,000 ₽
- another 250,000 ₽ is given to the Personality of the Year.
- the remaining 250,000 ₽ goes to the translator of the Missed Masterpiece.
- additionally, the Readers' Choice winner is awarded with 100,000 ₽ and a theme trip to South Korea, presented by Samsung.

== The jury ==
The jury, which consists of famous writers, critics and literature experts, select authors whose works preserve the traditions of classic literature and, at the same time, represent the relevant trends of modern Russian and foreign literature.

Yasnaya Polyana jury members include famous Russian writers, literary critics and public figures. As of 2020 there are:

- Vladimir Tolstoy– chairman of the jury, advisor to the President of the Russian Federation on cultural matters, journalist;
- Pavel Basinsky – journalist, writer, literary critic;
- Aleksey Varlamov – novelist, scholar of 20th-century Russian literature;
- Eugene Vodolazkin – literary critic, writer, winner of the Yasnaya Polyana literary award;
- Valentin Kurbatov – writer, essayist, literary critic;
- Vladislav Otroshenko – Russian writer and essayist, winner of the Yasnaya Polyana literary award.

== Winners ==
=== 2003 — 2005 ===
Year	Outstanding Work	Outstanding Debut
2003	Viktor Likhonosov	Vladislav Otroshenko
2004	Timur Zulfikanov	Anton Utkin
2005	Anatolij Kim	Alexander Yakovlev

=== 2006 — 2011 ===
Year	Contemporary Classics	21st Century
2006	Vasily Belov	Alexey Ivanov
2007	Leonid Borodin	Zakhar Prilepin
2008	Petr Krasnov	Ljudmila Saraskina
2009	Vladimir Lichutin	Vassilij Golovanov
2010	Mikhail Kuraev	Mikhail Tarkovsky
2011	Fazil Iskander	Yelena Katishonok

=== 2012 — 2014 ===
Year	Contemporary Classics	21st Century	Childhood, Boyhood, Youth
2012	Valentin Rasputin	Evgenij Kasimov	Andrey Dmitriev
2013	Yury Bondarev	Evgenij Vodolazkin	Yury Nechiporenko
2014	Boris Ekimov	Arsen Titov	Roman Senchin

=== 2015 — 2016 ===
Year	Contemporary Classics	21st Century	Childhood, Boyhood, Youth	Foreign Fiction	Readers' Choice
2015	Andrei Bitov	Guzel Yakhina	Valery Bylinsky	Ruth Ozeki, Ekaterina Ilyina (translator)	Guzel Yakhina
2016	Vladimir Makanin	Narine Abgaryan, Alexander Grigorenko	Marina Nefyodova	Orhan Pamuk, Apollinaria Avrutina (translator)	Narine Abgaryan

=== Since 2017 ===
Year	Contemporary Russian Fiction	Foreign Fiction	Event	Readers' Choice
2017	Andrei Rubanov	Mario Vargas Llosa, Kirill Korkonosenko (translator)	"LiteraTula" Children's Book Fair	Oleg Yermakov
2018	Olga Slavnikova	Amos Oz, Victor Radutski (translator)	Story of One Appointment (film)	Maria Stepanova
2019	Sergei Samsonov	Hernán Rivera Letelier, Darya Sinitsina (translator)	The Glass Bead Game (literary TV show)	Grigori Sluzhitel
2020	Evgeniy Chizov	Patricia Duncker, Alexandra Borisenko and Victor Sonkin (translators)	Oleg Pavlov	Sasha Filipenko
2021	German Sadulaev	Julian Barnes, Dmitry Simanovsky and Sergei Polotovsky (translators)	Каждый день сначала. Валентин Распутин и Валентин Курбатов: диалог длиною в сорок лет	Marina Stepnova
2022	Dmitry Danilov	Yu Hua, Yuliya Dreyzis (translator)		Islam Hanipaev

== See also ==
- Winners of Yasnaya Polyana Literary Award were announced // Gazeta.ru // 21.10.2014
- Medinsky has criticized the school literature programm //Lenta.ru// 21.10.2014
- Winners of Yasnaya Polyana Literary Award were announced // Vedomosti.ru// 22.10.2014
- The trilogy about the First World War won in Yasnaya Polyana Literary Award // Rg.ru// 22.10.2014
