= Life with an Idiot =

- Opera by Alfred Schnittke
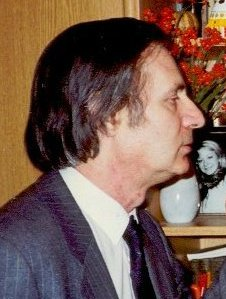
- Alfred Schnittke in 1989
- Native title: Жизнь с идиотом
- Librettist: Viktor Erofeyev
- Premiere: 13 April 1992; Het Muziektheater, Amsterdam

Life with an Idiot (Russian: Жизнь с идиотом, romanized: Zhizn s idiotom) is an opera by the Russian composer Alfred Schnittke to a Russian libretto by Viktor Erofeyev. Written as an allegory of oppression under the Soviet Union, the opera was first performed at Het Muziektheater, Amsterdam, on 13 April 1992.

== Roles ==
Roles, voice types, premiere cast
Role	Voice type	Premiere cast, 13 April 1992 Conductor: Mstislav Rostropovich
I	baritone	Dale Duesing/Romain Bischoff
Wife	soprano	Teresa Ringholz
Vova	tenor	Howard Haskin
Guard	bass	Leonid Zimnenko
Marcel Proust	baritone	Robbin Leggate

== Synopsis ==
Act 1
As a punishment for not working hard enough, "I" is forced by the authorities to live with an idiot. He chooses Vova from a lunatic asylum. Vova is only capable of speaking a single word: "Ech".

Act 2
At first Vova behaves well but then he suddenly begins to make a nuisance of himself, including tearing up I's wife's copy of the works of Marcel Proust. I and his wife go to live in another room and Vova calms down. I's wife falls in love with Vova and becomes pregnant by him. Then Vova and I turn on the wife. Vova kills her and I becomes an idiot.

== Recordings ==
- Life with an Idiot (live recording of premiere cast), Rotterdam Philharmonic Orchestra, conducted by Rostropovich (Sony)
