= Berd =

City in Tavush, Armenia

Berd Բերդ
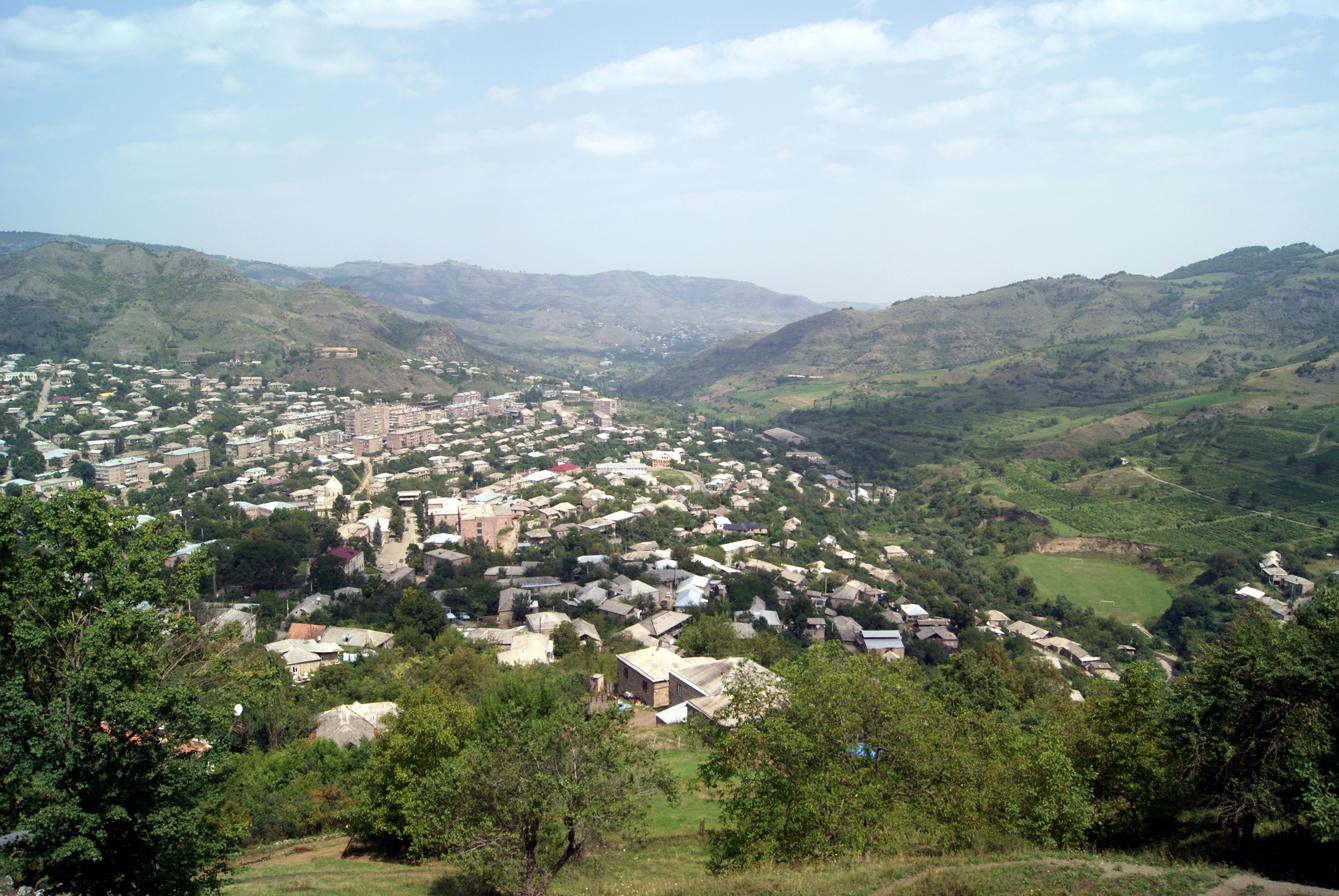
- A view of Berd

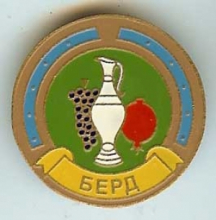
- Coat of arms

- Location within Armenia Location within Tavush
- Coordinates: 40°52′51″N 45°23′30″E
- Country: Armenia
- Province: Tavush
- Municipality: Berd
- Founded: 10th century

Area
  - Total: 3.5 km^{2} (1.4 sq mi)

Population (2022)
  - Total: 6,899
  - Density: 2,000/km^{2} (5,100/sq mi)
- Time zone: UTC+4 (AMT)

Berd (Armenian: Բերդ [bɛɾtʰ]) is a town in the Tavush Province of Armenia. It is the administrative centre of Berd Municipality. The town is located to the west of the Tavush River, 211 kilometres (131 miles) from Yerevan, surrounded by low mountains. Near the city are the ruins of the 10th-century Tavush Fortress and the 12th-century monasteries Nor Varagavank and Khoranashat. Other monasteries nearby include Shkhmuradi, Srveghi, and Kaptavank. As of the 2022 census, the town had a population of 6,899, down from the 7,957 recorded in the 2011 census.

== Etymology ==
Berd means 'fortress' or 'castle' in Armenian. The small town was named Berd because of its proximity to the ruins of the fortress of Tavush, located on the outskirts of the settlement. Throughout history, it has also been known as Berdagyugh, Tavuzghala, Tauzkend, Volorut, Shlorut and Ghalakyand.

== History ==
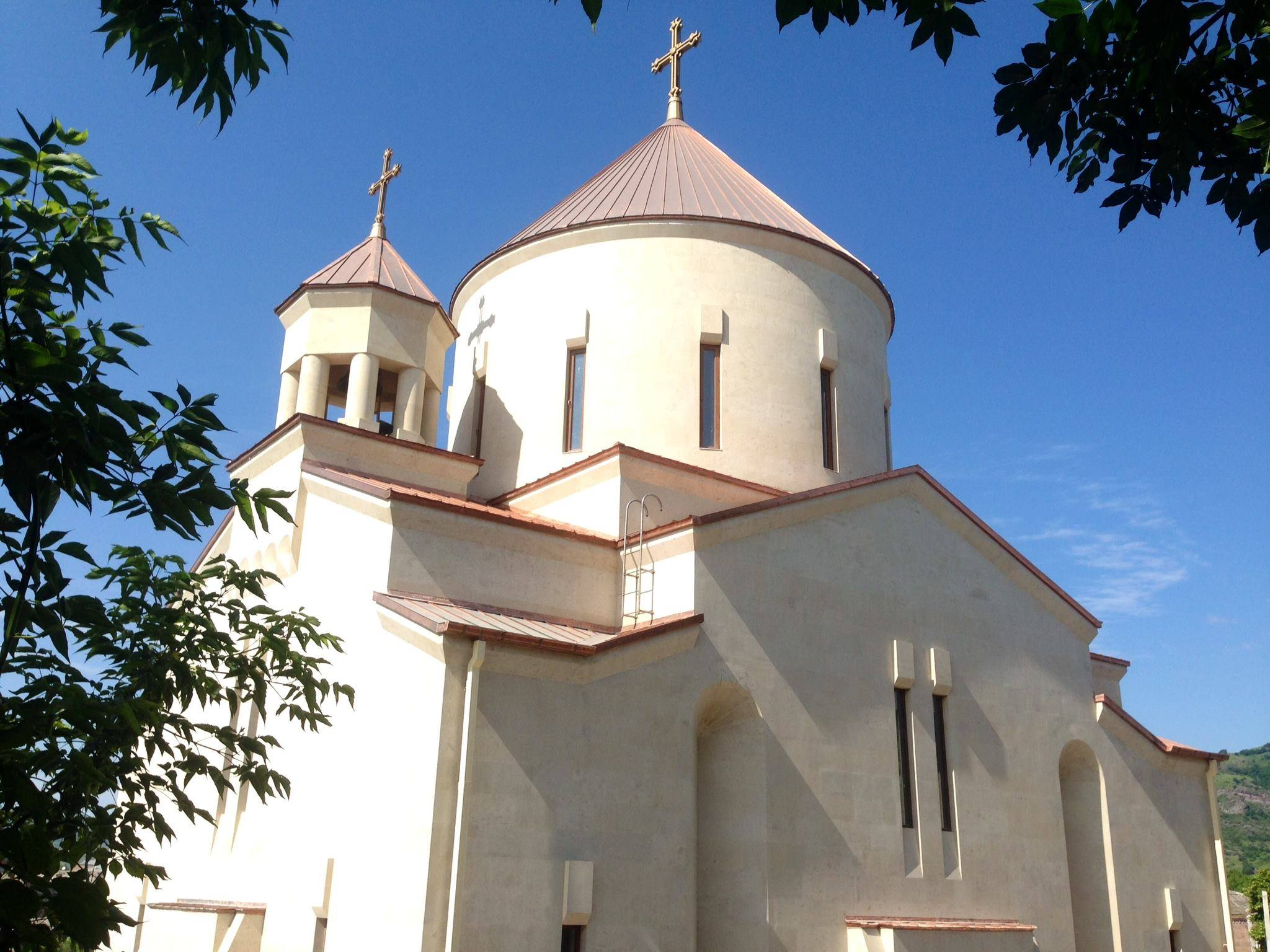
Surb Hovhannes Church in Berd

Historically, the area of modern-day Berd was part of the Tuchkatak canton of Utik, the twelfth province of Greater Armenia. It was first mentioned in the 10th century as the residence of the Armenian king Ashot II the Iron. The fortress had a developed water supply system. It was abandoned in the 14th century.

The town was bombarded during the July 2020 Armenian–Azerbaijan clashes.

== Demographics ==
As of the 2022 census, the town had a population of 6,899, down from the 7,957 recorded in the 2011 census.

The population are mainly Armenians. The town is also home to around 200 Udis, who belong to the Armenian Apostolic Church.

Historical population
Year	Pop.	±% p.a.
1897	1,345	—
1926	2,358	+1.95%
1939	4,422	+4.96%
1959	5,845	+1.40%
1976	8,520	+2.24%
1989	10,368	+1.52%
1991	11,200	+3.93%
2001	8,810	−2.37%
2011	7,957	−1.01%
2022	6,899	−1.29%

== Economy ==
Berd and the surrounding areas are a major centre for agricultural production in Armenia. Fruits, tobacco and other types are produced in the surrounding farms. Other notable industries of Berd include winemaking, beekeeping and animal husbandry.

== Notable people ==
- Gnel Medzhlumyan, was a Soviet Armenian freestyle wrestler. He is a European Champion.
- Narine Abgaryan, author.

== Gallery ==
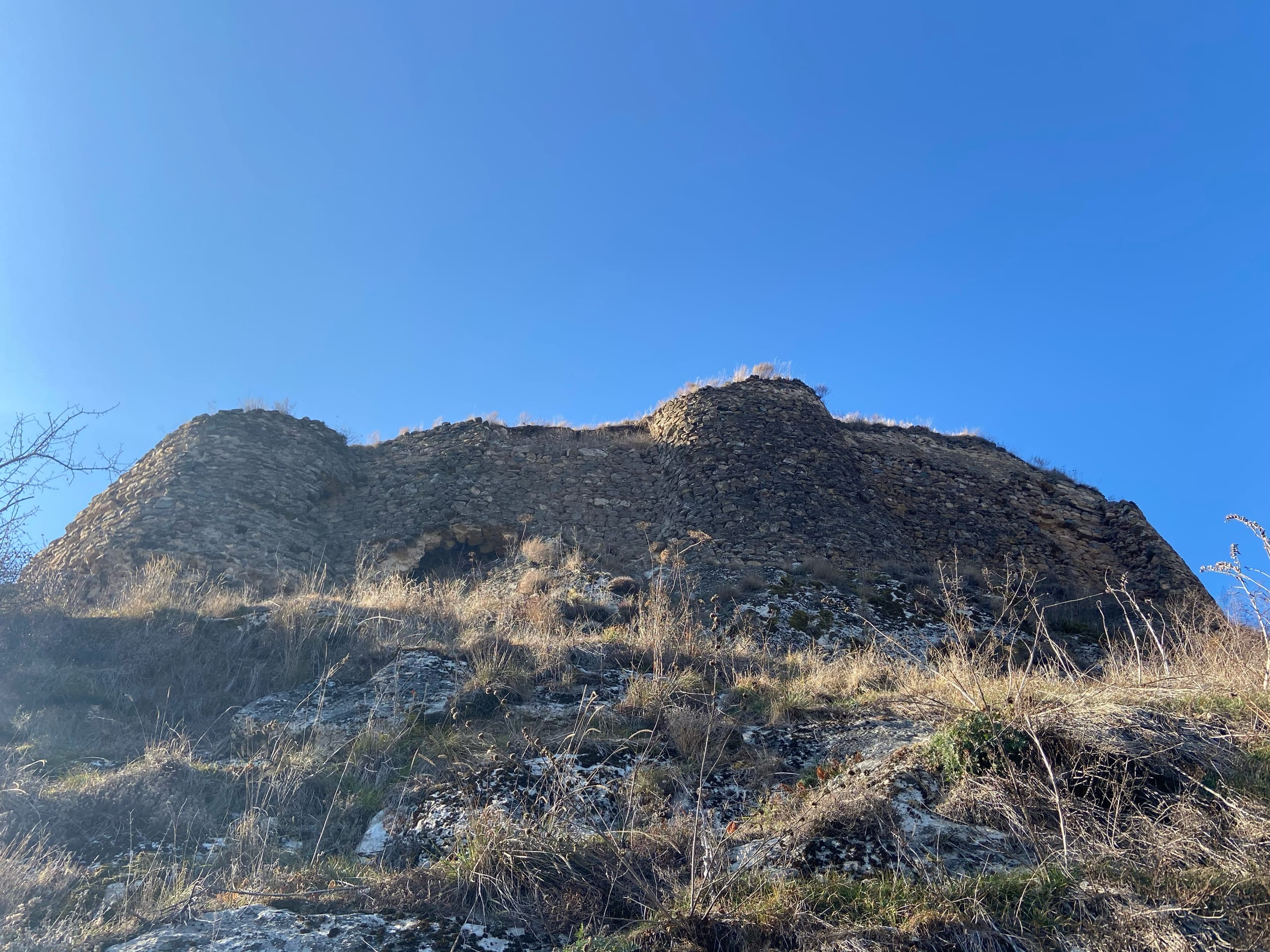
Tavush Fortress

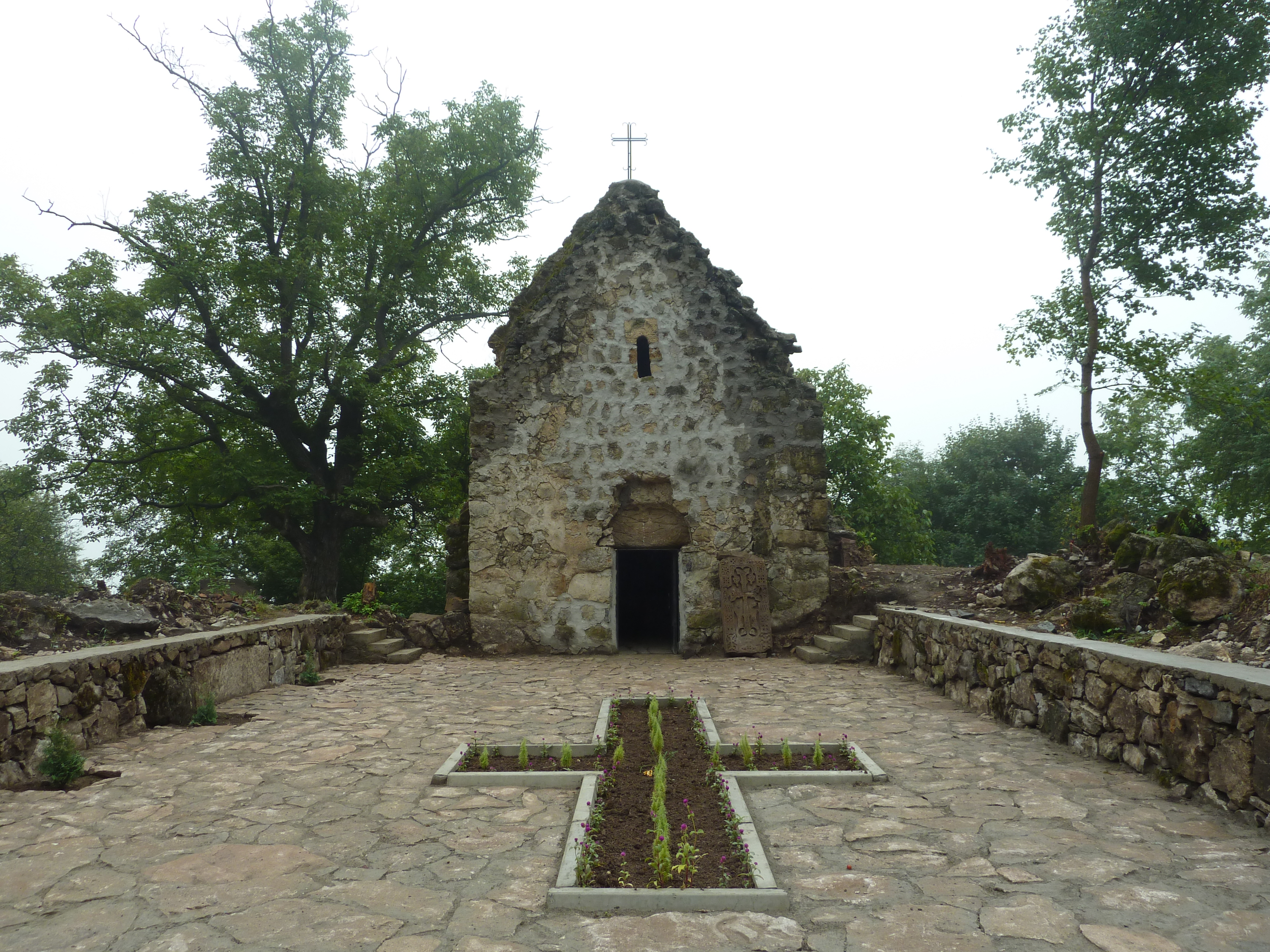
Mariam Mayr Vank near Berd

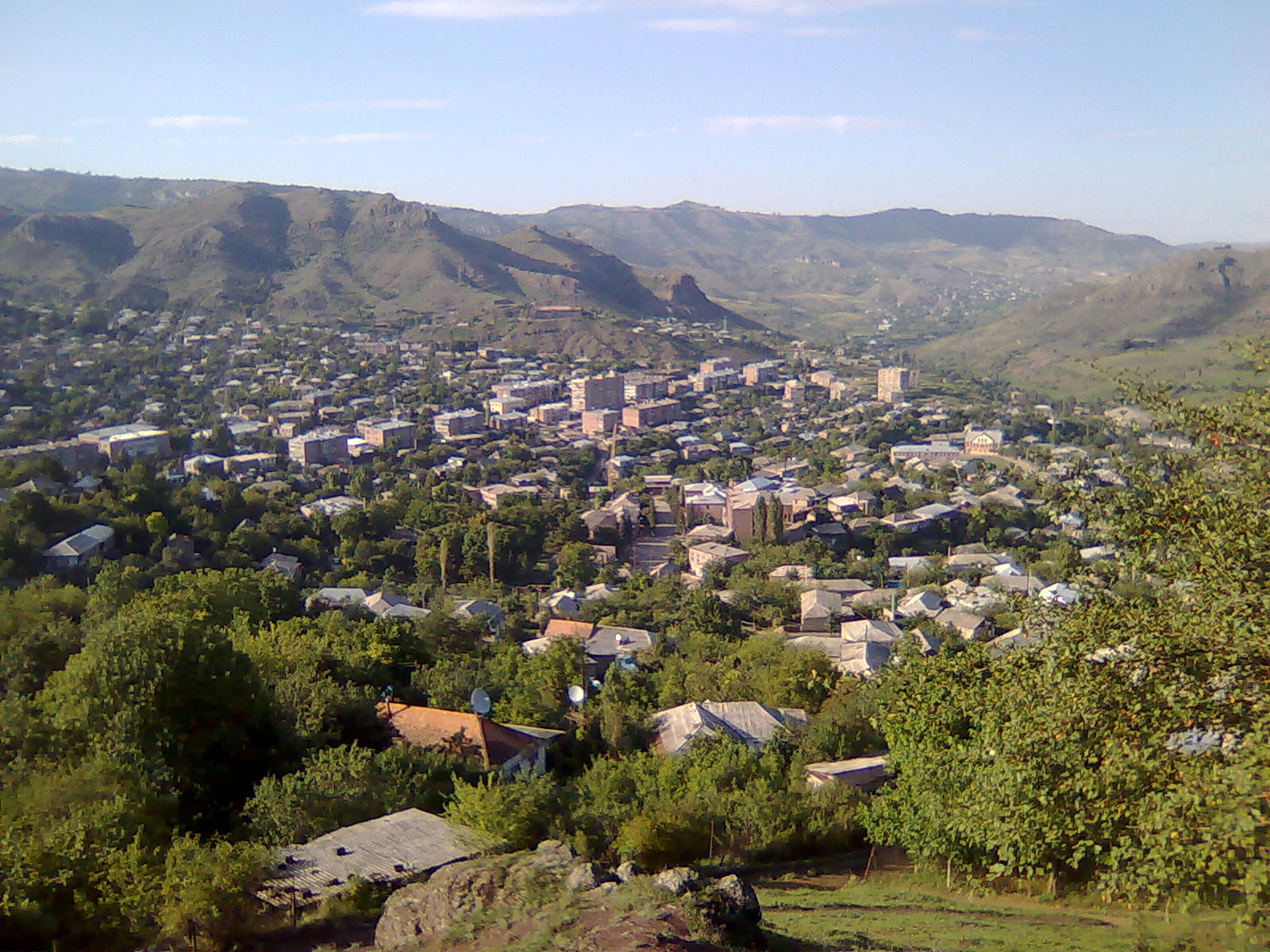
A view of Berd

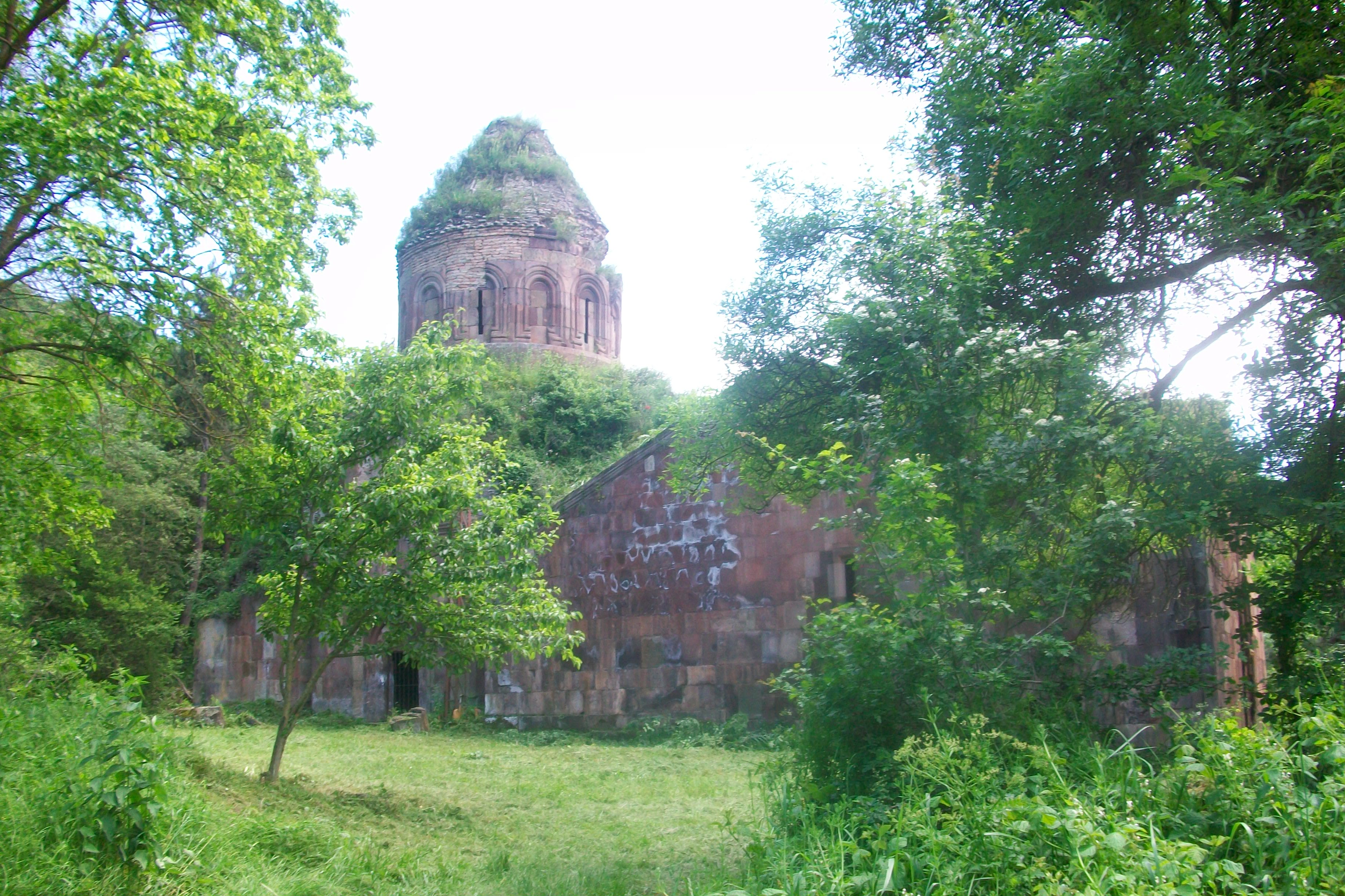
Khoranashat Monastery near Berd

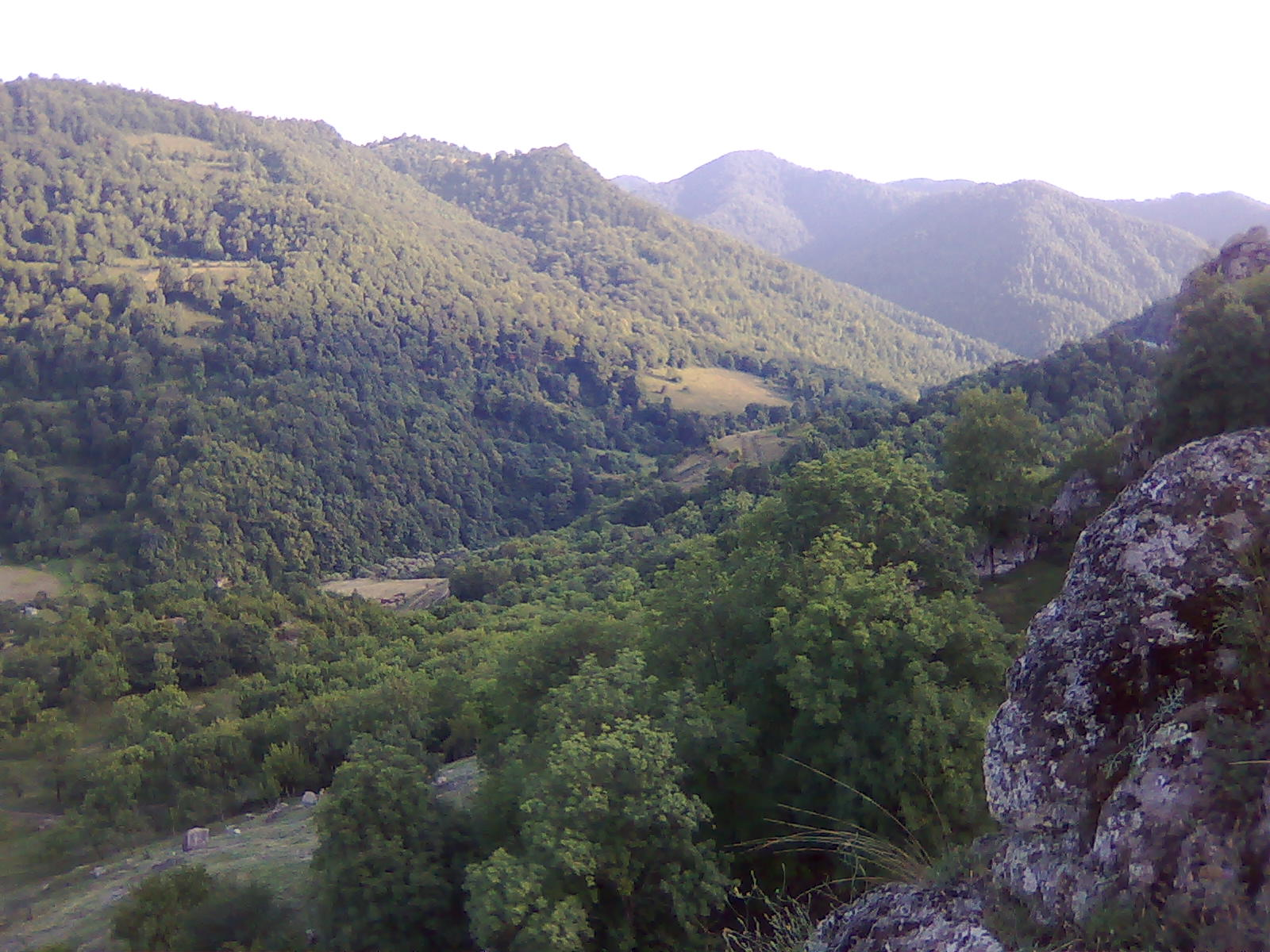
Scenery around Berd

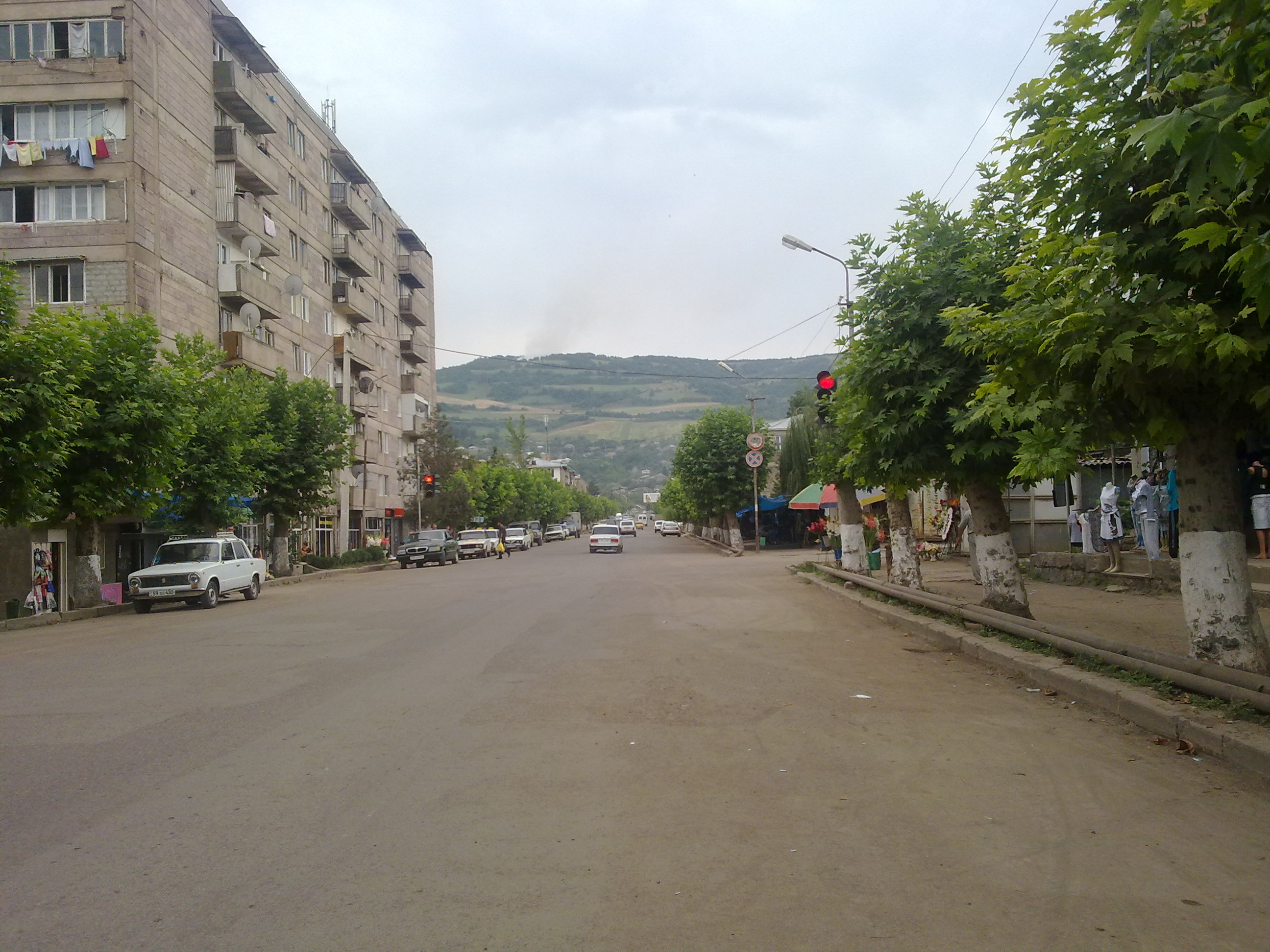
Mashtots Avenue
