= Solzhenitsyn Prize =

Russian literary award

The Solzhenitsyn Prize is a non-governmental Russian literary award established by the Russian writer Alexander Solzhenitsyn in 1997.

The $25,000 prize is awarded for "works in which troubles of the Russian life are shown with rare moral purity and sense of tragedy, for consecutiveness and steadiness in search of truth". The prize is financed by royalties from sales of The Gulag Archipelago.

== Laureates ==
- 1998 – Vladimir Toporov
- 1999 – Inna Lisnyanskaya
- 2000 – Valentin Rasputin
- 2001 – Konstantin Vorobyov (posthumous), Yevgeny Nosov
- 2002 – Aleksandr Panarin, Leonid Borodin
- 2003 – Olga Sedakova, Yuri Kublanovskij
- 2004 – Vladimir Bortko, Yevgeny Mironov
- 2005 – Igor Zolotussky
- 2006 – Alexei Varlamov
- 2007 – Sergei Bocharov, Andrey Zaliznyak
- 2008 – Boris Ekimov
- 2009 – Viktor Astafyev (posthumous)
- 2010 – Valentin Yanin
- 2011 – Yelena Chukovskaya
- 2012 – Oleg Pavlov
- 2013 – Maxim Amelin
- 2014 – Irina Rodnyanskaya
- 2015 – Sergey Zhenovach
- 2016 – Grigoriy Kruzhkov
- 2017 – Vladimir Enisherlov
- 2018 – Sergey Lyubayev, Victor Britvin
- 2019 – Eugene Vodolazkin
- 2020 – Natalya Mikhailova, Sergei Nekrasov

== See also ==
- List of literary awards
- Prizes named after people
