= Generations of Winter =

1994 novel by Vasily Aksyonov

- Author: Vasily Aksyonov
- Original title: Московская сага
- Language: Russian
- Publication date: 1994
- Publication place: Russia

Generations of Winter (in Russian, Московская сага - Moskovskaya Saga) is a novel by the Russian writer Vasily Aksyonov.

Many critics have praised Generations of Winter as a new Doctor Zhivago-style, large-scale Russian novel, which tells the story of a Russian/Georgian family, the Gradovs, struggling to survive in the Stalin era.

As the Wall Street Journal put it: "Aksyonov has ambitiously set out to challenge Tolstoy on his own ground, creating a gigantic historical novel on the grand pre-revolutionary model."

In late 2004 a television-series based on the novel premiered on Russian television. It has 22 episodes.
