= Anton Aleksandrovich Utkin =

Russian writer, film director, director and novelist

Anton Utkin
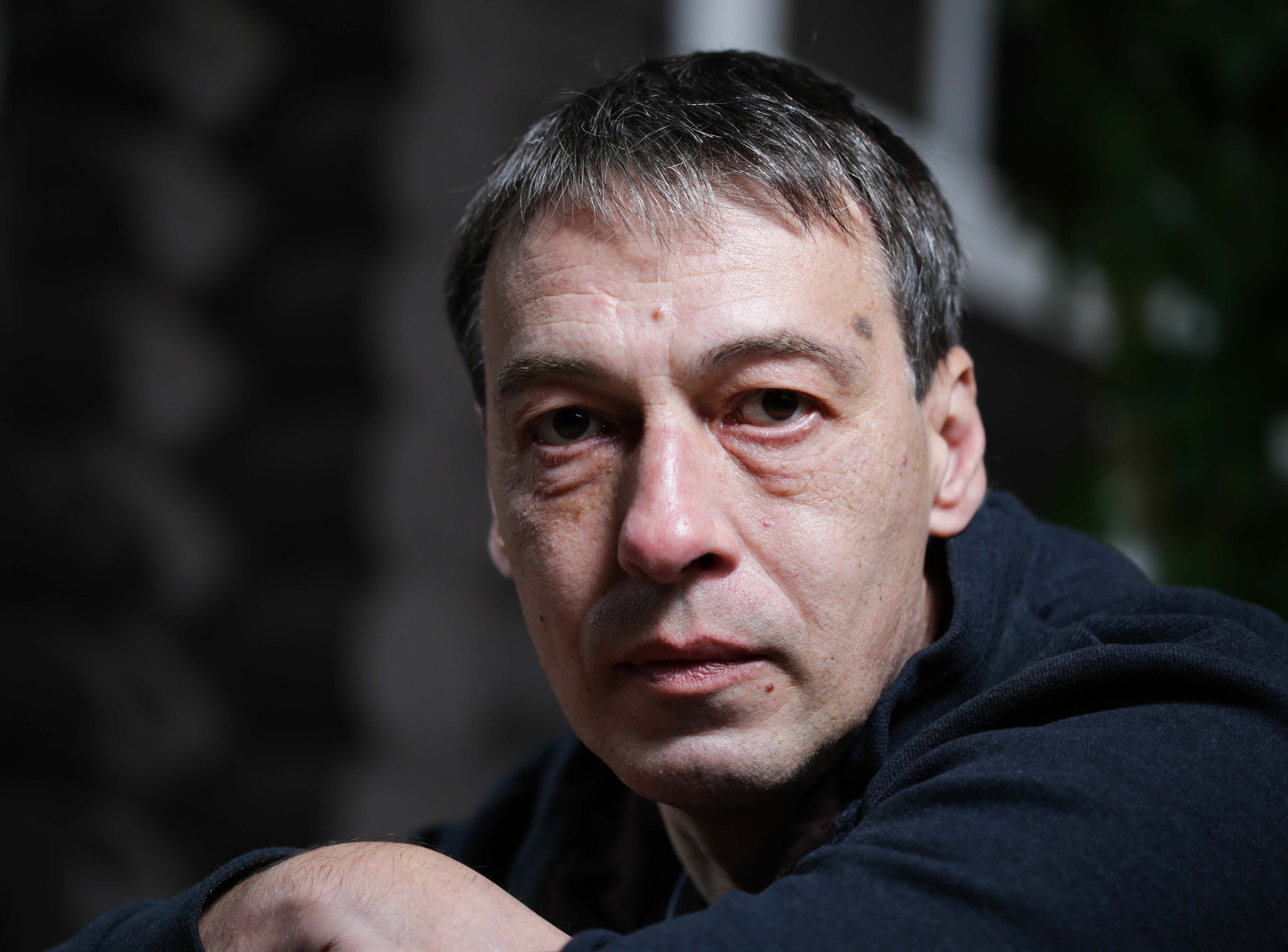
- Born: March 24, 1967 (age 59); Moscow
- Occupations: Writer, director of documentary film

Anton Aleksandrovich Utkine (Russian: Антон Александрович Уткин) is a Russian writer and director of documentary film born on March 24, 1967, in Moscow.

== Biography ==
Anton Utkin was born on March 24, 1967 in Moscow where he has always lived. During his high school years, he also attended classes at the Gnessine School of Music. After his military service, he studied at the Faculty of History of Moscow State University, Department of Source Studies of Russian History.

=== Writer ===
He started to work on his first novel at the same time as he was working on his final dissertation. His first novel Horovod (Round dance), published in the Novy mir literary magazine in 1996, was one of the six finalists of the Russian Booker Prize in 1997, one of the most important literary awards in Russia. In 1998 Utkin released his second novel, Samoučki (The Autodidacts), also published by Novy Mir. These two novels made his name known. They have been translated into French, German and Chinese. According to Marc Weinstein, a French specialist in Russian literature, the two novels of Anton Outkine "overcome the psychological and social darkness of the last two decades of the twentieth century and introduce us to an expression of literary vitalisme".

=== Director ===
After obtaining a master's degree in history in 1992, three years later Utkin entered the script department of the Higher Courses of Scriptwriters and Directors under the State Television Committee (workshop of Natalya Ryazantseva) where he became interested in documentary films. In 2005, he finished his first documentary Step (The Steppe).

== Literary works ==
Today Anton Outkine is the author of five novels and five documentary films as well as novelas and short stories.

=== Novels ===
- Horovod (1991—1995) : Moscou, Novyj mir, 1996, No. 9-11; Moscou, Grant, 1998 ISBN 5-89135-050-5; Paris, Gallimard, 2001 ISBN 2-07-075545-2; éditions AST-Astrel, Moscou, 2010; Pekin, Beijing Daxue Chubanshe, 2016 ISBN 978-7-301-26217-7.
- Samoučki (1997—1998) Moscou, Novyj mir, 1998, No. 12; Moscou, Grant, 1999; Vienne, Pereprava, 2002 ISBN 978-3950176902; Moscou, AST-Astrel, 2010 ISBN 978-5-17-069098-5; Pekin, Beijing Daxue Chubanshe, 2016, ISBN 978-7-301-26222-1.
- Krepostʹ somneniâ (2000—2006), Moscou, AST-Astrel, 2010 ISBN 978-5-17-063232-9.
- Doroga v snegopad (2008-2010), Moscou, AST-Astrel, 2011 ISBN 978-5-17-075478-6.
- Tridevâtʹ zemelʹ (2012-2016), publié dans la librairie numérique Litres.

=== Novellas and short stories ===
- « Svadʹba za Bugom », Novyj mir, No.8, 1997
- « Goroduha », Sovremennye otečestvennye zapiski, No.2, 1999
- « Idi, kuda vlečet tebâ svobodnyj um…», Znamâ, No.6, 1999
- « Ûžnyj kalendarʹ », Novyj mir, No. 8, 1999
- « Rasskazy », Ural, No. 11, 1999
- « Rasskazy », Oktâbrʹ, No. 1, 2000
- « Približenie k Tendre », Novyj mir, No. 10, 2003
- « Dym », Novyj mir No. 12, 2005
- « Veŝij tamburin », Oktâbrʹ No.4, 2008
- « Nastenʹka », Novyj mir, No. 11, 2008
- « V kamorke », Oktâbr’, No.10, 2014
- « Lûdi srednego vozrasta», Znamâ, N°2, 2018

=== Other publications ===
- Približenie k Tendre : povesti i rasskazy, Toula, Âsnaâ Polâna, 2005 ISBN 5-93322-021-3
- Ûžnyj Kalendarʹ : povesti i rasskazy, Moscou, AST-Astrelʹ, 2010 ISBN 978-5-17-069854-7
- Russkaâ proza konca XX veka : hrestomatiâ dlâ studentov, Moscou, Akademiâ, 2002 ISBN 5-84650-031-5
- Proza novoj Rossii v četyreh tomah. Tom 4, Moscou, Vagrius, 2003 ISBN 5-264-00898-1
- Antologie ruskych povidek, Brno, Literary Guide, 2007 ISBN 9788086907406

== Filmography ==
=== Screenplay writer ===
- 2003 : Poputčiki inžira, Egor Anaškin's short film
- 2010 : Ûžnyj kalendar by Denis Karro

=== Director and screenplay writer ===
- 2005 : Step
- 2008 : Carʹ-svet, Audience Prize ( Rodos Ecofilms 2009, International Films)
- 2011 : Okružaûŝij mir, en collaboration avec Andrej Semaško. Grand Prix of the 4th Pan-Russian Documentary Film Festival Sol' Zemli, 2011
- 2012 : Žito, Grand Prix of the 5th Pan-Russian Documentary Film Festival Sol' Zemli, 2012
- 2012 : Nepereletnye pticy, in collaboration with Andrej Semaško

== Rewards ==
- 2011 : Grand Prix of the 4th Pan-Russian Documentary Film Festival Sol' Zemli
- 1996 and 2003 : Novy Mir Award
- 2004 : Yasnaya Polyana Literary Award
- 1997 : Finalist of the Russian Booker Prize
