= Semyon Lipkin =

Russian writer, poet and literary translator

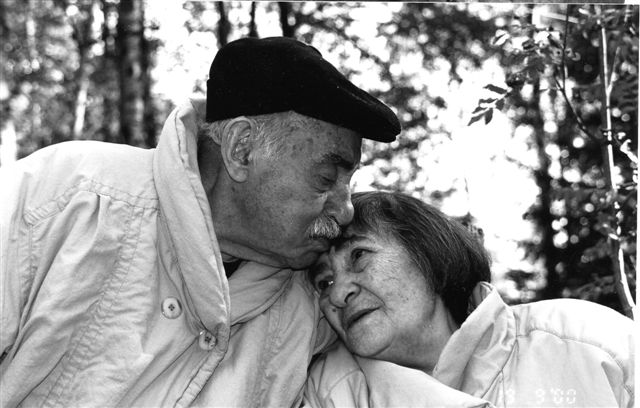
- Lipkin and his wife, poet Inna Lisnyanskaya
- Born: 6 September 1911; Odessa, Russian Empire
- Died: 31 March 2003 (aged 91); Peredelkino, Russia
- Occupations: Poet, writer, soldier
- Writing career
- Period: 1911-2003
- Genres: Poetry, fiction, memoir, translations
- Subjects: World War II, History, Philosophy, Literature, Folklore, Jewish heritage, The Bible
- Notable works: Kvadriga Memoirs, The Lieutenant Quartermaster (An epic poem)
- Movement: Neo-Acmeism

Semyon Izrailevich Lipkin (Russian: Семён Израилевич Липкин) (6 September 1911 – 31 March 2003) was a Russian writer, poet, and literary translator.

Lipkin's work gained wider recognition after the collapse of the Soviet Union. He was supported by his wife, poet Inna Lisnyanskaya. Lipkin was a close friend of Anna Akhmatova, Joseph Brodsky and Alexander Solzhenitsyn. Lipkin's poetry explores themes of history and philosophy.

His poems reference his Jewish heritage and the Bible, and draw on his experiences in World War II and the Great Purge. Lipkin's opposition to the Soviet regime became public in 1979-1980 when he contributed to the uncensored almanac "Metropol." Subsequently, he and Lisnyanskaya left the Union of Soviet Writers.

== Early years ==
Lipkin was born in Odessa to Israel and Rosalia Lipkin on September 6, 1911. He was of Jewish ethnicity. His father, a tailor, was active in the Menshevik movement. Lipkin's early education included Hebrew and Torah instruction. His education was interrupted by the Bolshevik Revolution and the Russian Civil War. In 1929 he moved to Moscow, where he studied engineering and economics, graduating from the Moscow Engineering-Economic Institute in 1937. He also studied various languages, including Persian, Kalmyk, Kirghiz, Kazakh, Tatar, Tajik and Uzbek.

== Military career ==
Lipkin's military career began with the German invasion in June 1941, when he was enlisted as a war correspondent with the rank of senior lieutenant at the Baltic Fleet base in Kronstadt. He later served with the 110th Kalmyk cavalry division and the Volga River Flotilla at Stalingrad. He participated in the Battle of Stalingrad and reported on it. He received four military orders and several medals.

== Literary career ==
Lipkin published his first poem at 15, which was praised by Eduard Bagritsky. However, the Soviet regime prevented him from publishing until his sixties. Wider recognition came when he was 70. His literary circle, which included Anna Akhmatova and Joseph Brodsky, recognized his talent much earlier.

In the 1930s, Lipkin met influential figures like poets Osip Mandelstam, Anna Akhmatova, and Marina Tsvetayeva, and prose writers Vasily Grossman and Andrey Platonov, whom he described in his memoir Kvadriga.

Lipkin was a renowned literary translator, often working from languages suppressed by Stalin. He also immersed himself in the cultures of the languages he translated, including Abkhaz, Akkadian, Buryat, Dagestani, Karbardinian, Kalmyk, Kirghiz, Tatar, Tadjik-Farsi and Uzbek. He famously hid a typescript of Vasily Grossman's Life and Fate from the KGB, initiating its journey to the West. Lipkin's translations and literary work earned him numerous accolades, including the title of Kalmykia National Poet (1967) and Hero of Kalmykia (2001).

=== English translations of Semyon Lipkin’s work ===
- After Semyon Izrailevich Lipkin, translation by Yvonne Green. London: Smith/Doorstop, 2011.
- Testimony from the Literary Memoirs of Semyon Izrailevich Lipkin translation by Yvonne Green. (Hendon Press, 2023) ISBN 978-1-739778-51-4
- A Close Reading of Fifty-three poems by Semyon Izrailevich Lipkin translation by Yvonne Green.(Hendon Press, 2023) ISBN 978-1-739778-52-1

=== French translations of Semyon Lipkin’s work ===
- Le Destin de Vassili Grossman (L'Age d'Homme 1990) tr Alexis Berelowitch
- L'histoire d'Alim Safarov, écrivain russe du Caucase (Dekada [Decade]). La Tour-d'Aigues: Editions de l'Aube, 2008.

== Friendship with Vasily Grossman ==
In 1961, the manuscript for Vasily Grossman's Life and Fate was confiscated by the KGB. Semyon Lipkin hid a copy at his dacha and later gave it to Elena Makarova and Sergei Makarov for safekeeping. (Elena Makarova was Lipkin's stepdaughter, and Sergei Makarov her husband.) In 1975, Lipkin enlisted Vladimir Voinovich and Andrey Sakharov to smuggle the manuscript to the West, leading to its publication in 1980. In 2013, Grossman's manuscript was released from the Russian State Archive of Literature and Art.
