= Vasily Aksyonov =

Soviet and Russian novelist (1932–2009)

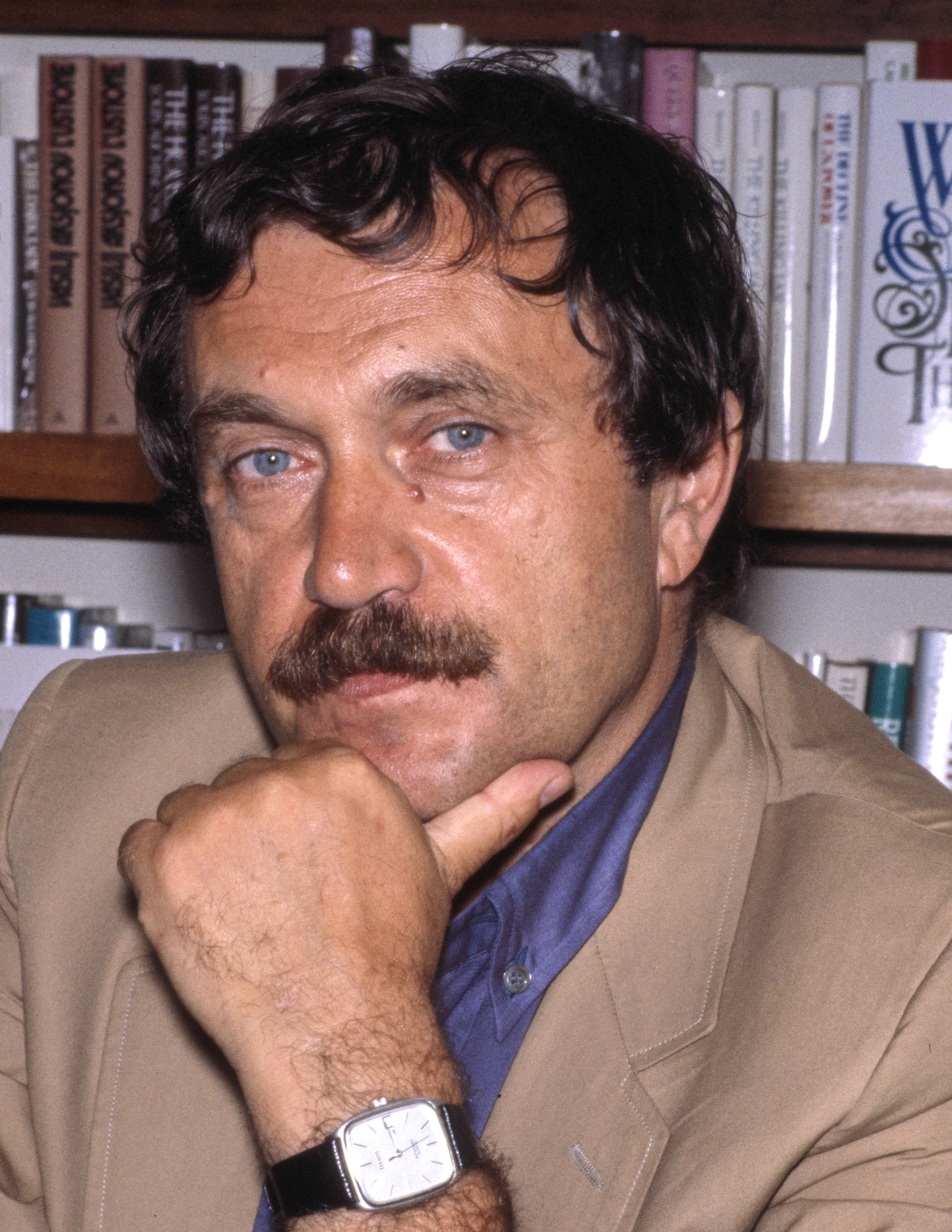
- Aksyonov in 1980
- Born: Vasily Pavlovich Aksyonov; August 20, 1932; Kazan, Soviet Union
- Died: July 6, 2009 (aged 76); Moscow, Russia
- Education: Kazan University and First Pavlov State Medical University of St. Peterburg
- Occupations: Doctor, writer
- Writing career
- Period: 1950s–2000s
- Notable works: The Burn, The Island of Crimea and The Moscow Saga, known in English as Generations of Winter

Vasily Pavlovich Aksyonov (Russian: Васи́лий Па́влович Аксёнов, IPA: [vɐˈsʲilʲɪj ˈpavləvʲɪtɕ ɐˈksʲɵnəf]; August 20, 1932 – July 6, 2009) was a Soviet and Russian novelist. He became known in the West as the author of The Burn (Ожог, Ozhog, from 1975) and of Generations of Winter (Московская сага, Moskovskaya Saga, from 1992), a family saga following three generations of the Gradov family between 1925 and 1953.

== Early life and education ==
When I was in Kazan during my student years, I was under surveillance by the KGB. I didn’t realize it at first—it was only after they began "inviting" my friends in to talk that I realized they were following me, and our whole group. It wasn’t like it is here at an American university—we were all one group in our class, a group of about 30 which existed together the entire six years of study; we had all of our classes together and were all living together.

— Vasily Aksyonov remembers his life as a student,

Vasily Aksyonov was born to Pavel Aksyonov and Yevgenia Ginzburg in Kazan, USSR on August 20, 1932. His mother, Yevgenia Ginzburg, was a successful journalist and educator and his father, Pavel Aksyonov, had a high position in the administration of Kazan. Both parents "were prominent communists." In 1937, however, both were arrested and tried for her alleged connection to Trotskyists. They were both sent to the Gulag and then into exile, and "each served 18 years, but remarkably survived." "Later, Yevgenia came to prominence as the author of a famous memoir, Into the Whirlwind, documenting the brutality of Stalinist repression."

Aksyonov remained in Kazan with his nanny and grandmother until the NKVD arrested him as a son of "enemies of the people", and sent him to an orphanage without providing his family any information on his whereabouts. Aksyonov "remained [there] until rescued in 1938 by his uncle, with whose family he stayed until his mother was released into exile, having served 10 years of forced labour." "In 1947, Vasily joined her in exile in the notorious Magadan, Kolyma prison area, where he graduated from high school." Vasily's half-brother Alexei (from Ginzburg's first marriage to Dmitriy Fedorov) died from starvation in besieged Leningrad in 1941.

His parents, seeing that doctors had the best chance to survive in the camps, decided that Aksyonov should go into the medical profession. "He therefore entered the Kazan University and graduated in 1956 from the First Pavlov State Medical University of St. Peterburg" and worked as a doctor for the next 3 years. During his time as a medical student he came under surveillance by the MGB, who began to prepare a dossier against him. It is likely that he would have been arrested had the liberalisation that followed Stalin's death in 1953 not intervened.

== Career ==
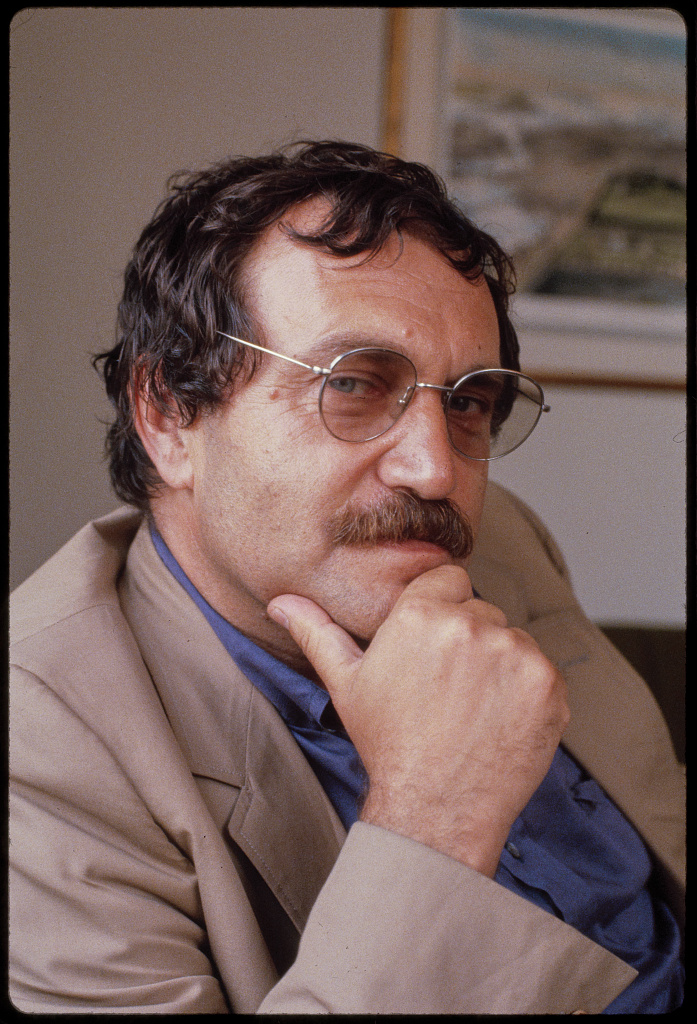
Aksyonov in 1980

Reportedly, "during the liberalisation that followed Stalin's death in 1953, Aksyonov came into contact with the first Soviet countercultural movement of zoot-suited hipsters called stilyagi (the ones 'with style')." As a result,

He fell in love with their slang, fashions, libertine lifestyles, dancing and especially their music. From this point on began his lifelong romance with jazz. Interest in his new milieu, western music, fashion and literature turned out to be life-changing for Aksyonov, who decided to dedicate himself to chronicling his times through literature. He remained a keen observer of youth, with its ever-changing styles, movements and trends. Like no other Soviet writer, he was attuned to the developments and changes in popular culture.

In 1956, he was "discovered" and heralded by the Soviet writer Valentin Kataev for his first publication, in the liberal magazine Youth. "His first novel, Colleagues (1961), was based on his experiences as a doctor." "His second, Ticket to the Stars (1961), depicting the life of Soviet youthful hipsters, made him an overnight celebrity."

In the 1960s Aksyonov was a frequent contributor to the popular Yunost ("Youth") magazine and eventually became a staff writer. Aksyonov thus reportedly became "a leading figure in the so-called "youth prose" movement and a darling of the Soviet liberal intelligentsia and their western supporters: his writings stood in marked contrast to the dreary, socialist-realist prose of the time." "Aksyonov's characters spoke in a natural way, using hip lingo, they went to bars and dance halls, had premarital sex, listened to jazz and rock'n'roll and hustled to score a pair of cool American shoes." "There was a feeling of freshness and freedom about his writings, similar to the one emanating from black-market recordings of American jazz and pop." "He soon became one of the informal leaders of the Shestidesyatniki—which translates roughly as "the '60s generation"—a group of young Soviets who resisted the Communist Party's cultural and ideological restrictions." "'It was amazing: We were being brought up robots, but we began to listen to jazz,' Aksyonov said in a 2007 documentary about him."

For all his hardship, Aksyonov,

as a prose stylist, was at the opposite pole from Mr. Solzhenitsyn, becoming a symbol of youthful promise and embracing fashion and jazz rather than dwelling on the miseries of the gulag. Ultimately, however, he shared Mr. Solzhenitsyn's fate of exile from the Soviet Union.

Solzhenitsyn is all about the imprisonment and trying to get out, and Aksyonov is the young person whose mother got out and he actually can live his life now, said Nina L. Khrushcheva, who is a granddaughter of Nikita Khrushchev and a friend of the Aksyonov family and who teaches international affairs at the New School in New York. It was important to have the Aksyonov light, that light of personal freedom and personal self-expression.

However, as Mark Yoffe notes in Aksyonov's obituary, his "open pro-Americanism and liberal values eventually led to problems with the KGB." "And his involvement in 1979 with an independent magazine, Metropol, led to an open confrontation with the authorities." His next two celebrated dissident novels, The Burn and The Island of Crimea, could not be published in the USSR. "The former explored the plight of intellectuals under communism and the latter was an imagining of what life might have been like had the white army staved off the Bolsheviks in 1917."

"When The Burn was published in Italy in 1980, Aksyonov accepted an invitation for him and his wife Maya to leave Russia for the US." "Soon afterwards, he was stripped of his Soviet citizenship, regaining it only 10 years later during Gorbachev's perestroika."

"Aksyonov spent the next 24 years in Washington, D.C., and Virginia, where he taught Russian Literature at George Mason University." "He [also] taught literature at a number of [other] American universities, including USC and Goucher College in Maryland... [and] worked as a journalist for Radio Liberty."

"He continued to write novels, among which was the ambitious Generations of Winter (1994), a multi-generational saga of Soviet life that became a successful Russian TV mini-series." The so-called "The Moscow Saga, [this 1994] epic trilogy... described the lives of three generations of a Soviet family between the 1917 Bolshevik Revolution and Stalin's death in 1953." The TV mini-series consisted of 24 episodes and was broadcast on Russian television in 2004. "[In 1994], he also won the Russian Booker Prize, Russia's top literary award, for his historical novel Voltairian Men and Women, about a meeting between the famous philosopher Voltaire and Empress Catherine II."

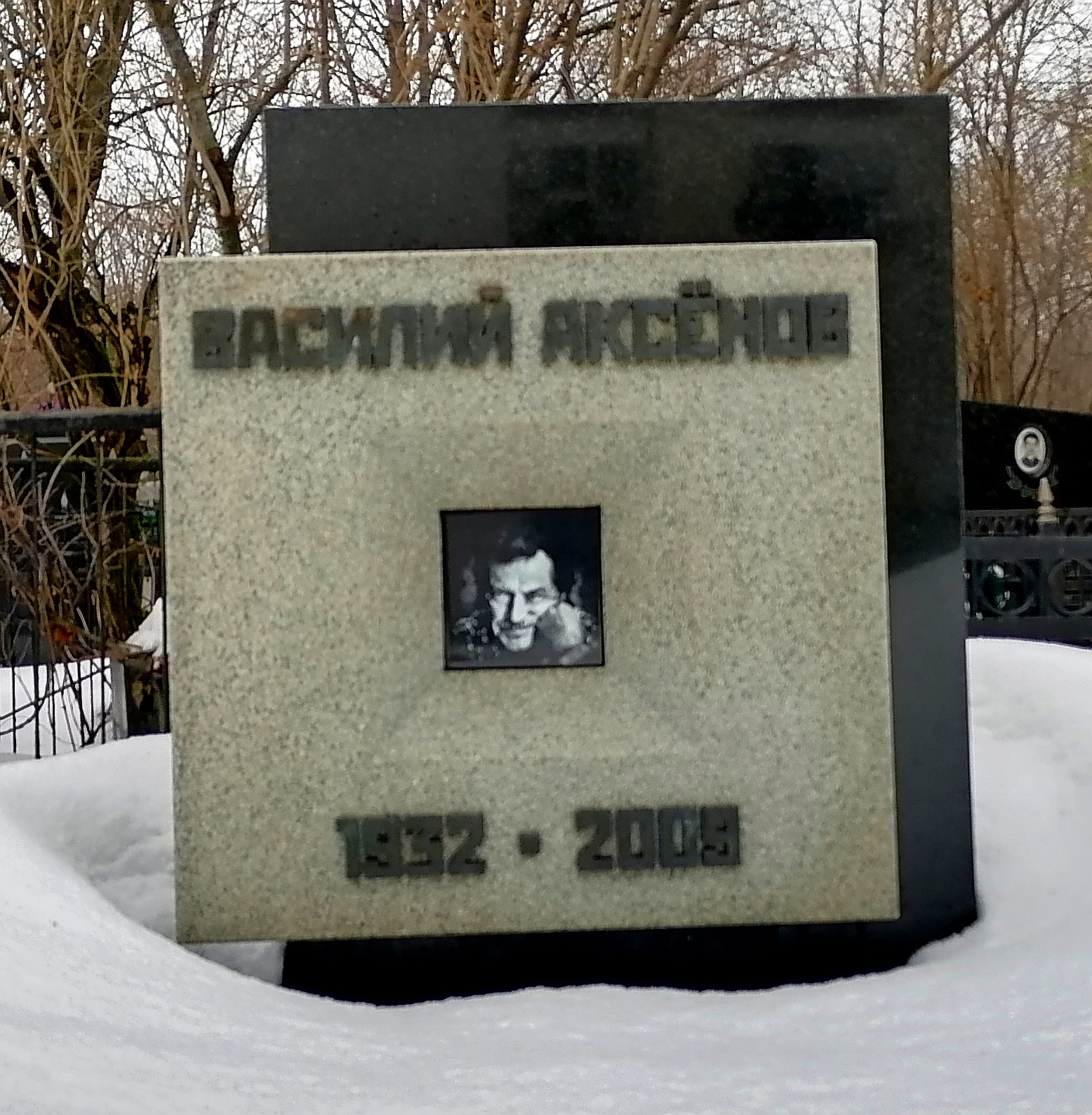
Grave of Vasily Aksyonov in Moscow

"In 2004, he settled in Biarritz, France, and returned to the US less frequently, dividing his time between France and Moscow." His novel Moskva-kva-kva (2006) was published in the Moscow-based magazine Oktyabr.

"Aksyonov was translated into numerous languages, and in Russia remained influential". In addition to writing novels, he is also known as the author of poems, occasionally performed as songs. He was reportedly "forever a hipster [and] was used to being in the avant garde, be it in fashion or literary innovation." He was described as "a colourful man, with his trademark moustache, elegant suits, expensive cars, and a love for grand cities, fine wine and good food."

On July 6, 2009, he died in Moscow at the age of 76. He is buried at the Vagankovo Cemetery in Moscow.

== Political views ==
Vasily Aksyonov was a convinced anti-totalitarian. On the presentation of one of his last novels, he stated: "If in this country one starts erecting Stalin statues again, I have to reject my native land. Nothing else remains."

== Novels ==
His other novels include:

- Colleagues ("Коллеги" – Kollegi, 1960)
- Ticket to the Stars ("Звёздный билет" – Zvyozdny bilet, 1961)
- Oranges from Morocco ("Апельсины из Марокко" – Apel'siny iz Marokko, 1963)
- It's Time, My Friend, It's Time ("Пора, мой друг, пора" – Pora, moy drug, pora, 1964)
- It's a Pity You Weren't with Us ("Жаль, что вас не было с нами" – Zhal', chto vas ne bylo s nami, 1965)
- "Half-way To The Moon" ("На полпути к Луне", 1966)
- Overstocked Packaging Barrels ("Затоваренная бочкотара" – Zatovarennaya bochkotara, 1968)
- "My Grandfather Is A Monument" ("Мой дедушка – памятник", 1970)
- "Love for Electricity" ("Любовь к электричеству", 1971)
- In Search of a Genre ("В поисках жанра" – V poiskakh zhanra, 1972)
- "Our Golden Piece Of Metal ("Золотая наша Железка", 1973)
- "The Burn" ("Ожог", 1975)
- Translation of E.L. Doctorow's Ragtime into Russian (1976)
- The Island of Crimea ("Остров Крым" – "Ostrov Krym", 1979)
- "The Steel Bird and Other Stories" ("Стальная Птица и Другие Рассказы", 1979)
- "Paper Landscape" ("Бумажный пейзаж", 1982)
- Say Cheese ("Скажи изюм" – Skazhi izyum, 1983)
- In Search of Melancholy Baby ("В поисках грустного бэби" – V poiskakh grustnogo bebi, 1987)
- Yolk of the Egg (written in English, author's translate in Russian – "Желток яйца" – Zheltok yaytsa, 1989)
- Generations of Winter (English ed. of "Московская сага", 1994). Random House. ISBN 0-394-56961-X.
- The Winter's Hero (English ed. of Tiur ma i mir, 1996). Random House. ISBN 0-679-43274-4.
- The New Sweet Style ("Новый сладостный стиль" – Novy sladostny stil', 1998)
- "Cesarean" ("Кесарево свечение", 2000)
- Voltairian Men and Women ("Вольтерьянцы и вольтерьянки" – Volteryantsy i volteryanki, 2004 – won the Russian Booker Prize).
- Moscow ow ow ("Москва Ква-Ква" – Moskva Kva-Kva, 2006)
- Rare Earths ("Редкие земли" – Redkie zemli, 2007)

== Theatre ==
- Colleagues 1959
- Always In Sale 1965
- Duel 1969
- The Four Temperaments published in the Literary Almanac "Metropol", New York and London 1979, ISBN 0-393-01438-X

== Literature ==
- "The Poet Vasily Aksyonov" essay 1980 and thesis of Herbert Gantschacher for obtaining the academic title "Master of Arts" at the Academy, today University of Music and Performing Arts, Graz, Re / 1653/1988, July 1988
- "A Life 'In A Burning Skin'" essay by Jürgen Serke in "The Banned Poets", Hamburg 1982, ISBN 3-8135-0826-9
