= List of Russian-language novelists =

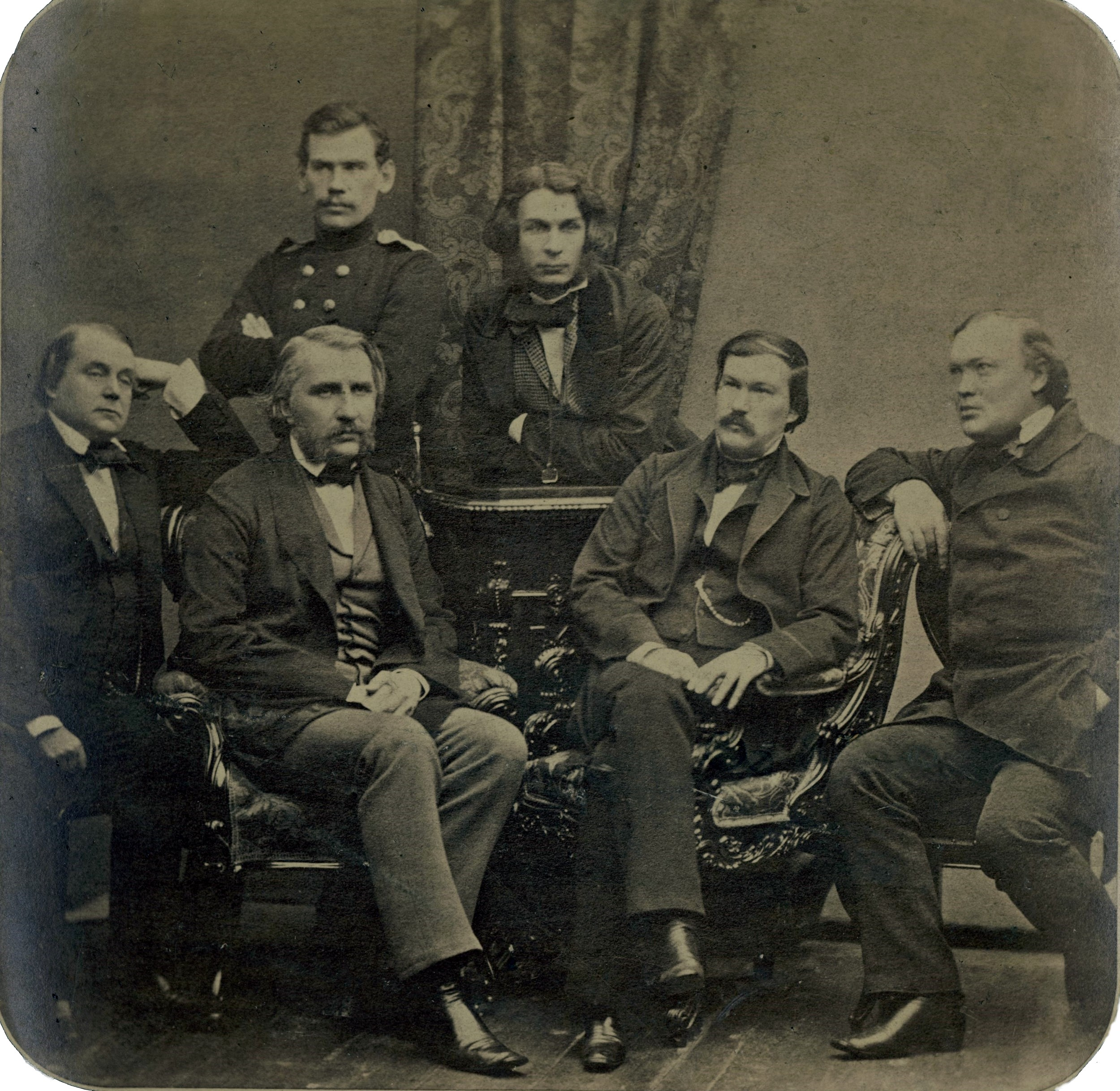
"Russian Writers" by Sergei Levitsky, 1856

This is a list of authors who have written works of fiction in the Russian language. The list encompasses novelists and writers of short fiction.

== Alphabetical list ==
=== A ===
Portrait	Author	Notable works	Illustration	Illustration
	Narine Abgaryan (b.1971)	Three Apples Fell From the Sky; Manyunya		
	Fyodor Abramov (1920–1983)	The New Life; Wooden Horses; Two Winters and Three Summers	Memorial plaque in St. Petersburg	
	M. Ageyev (1898–1973)	Novel with Cocaine	First edition cover	
	Chinghiz Aitmatov (1928–2008)	Jamilya; The White Ship; The Day Lasts More Than a Hundred Years	At a book signing in St. Petersburg, 2007	Aitmatov (left) at the 2007 Cologne Literature Festival with Publishing Director Lucien Leitess (center) and Mongolian writer Galsan Tschinag (right)
	David Aizman (1869–1922)	The Countrymen		
	Sergey Aksakov (1791–1859)	The Scarlet Flower; The Family Chronicle; Years of Childhood; A Russian Schoolboy	Memorial to Aksakov	The Aksakov Family Coat of Arms
	Vasily Aksyonov (1932–2009)	The Burn; Colleagues; Generations of Winter; The Winter's Hero		
	Boris Akunin (born 1956)	Erast Fandorin series Nicholas Fandorin series Sister Pelagia series	Akunin at the HeadRead literary festival, 2011	
	Mikhail Albov (1851–1911)	On the New Road		
	Yuz Aleshkovsky (1929–2022)	The Hand; Kangaroo		
	Alexander Amfiteatrov (1862–1938)	Napoleonder; The Fire Flower	Napoleon Bonaparte	Painting of Napoleon by David, 1812
	Daniil Andreyev (1906–1959)	Roza Mira	Daniil's parents Leonid Andreyev and Countess Anna Wielhorska	
	Leonid Andreyev (1871–1919)	Darkness; The Abyss; The Red Laugh; The Seven Who Were Hanged	1909 book cover	
	Yury Annenkov (1889–1974)	A Tale of Trivia	Annenkov's 1917 self-portrait	
	Aleksey Apukhtin (1840–1893)	From Death to Life; The Archive of Countess D	Illustration from Apukhtin's novel From Death to Life	Memorial plaque in Bolkhov
	Maria Arbatova (born 1957)	My name is Woman	Maria Arbatova in 2009	
	Mikhail Artsybashev (1878–1927)	Sanin; Ivan Lande; Breaking Point; Tales of the Revolution	Artsybashev with the actress Yavorskaya, 1915	Drawing of Artsybashev
Monument in Krasnoyarsk.	Viktor Astafyev (1924–2001)	Queen Fish; Sad Detective; To Live Your Life; The Cursed and the Slain	Vladimir Putin speaking with Astafyev's widow, 2004	
	Arkady Averchenko (1881–1925)	Ninochka	Drawing of Averchenko	Averchenko, c. 1905

=== B ===
Portrait	Author	Notable works	Illustration	Illustration
	Isaak Babel (1894–1940)	Red Cavalry; The Odessa Tales	Red Cavalry poster, 1919	Red Cavalry poster, 1920
	Grigory Baklanov (1923–2009)	The Foothold; Forever Nineteen; South of the Main Offensive		
	Natalya Baranskaya (1908–2004)	A Week Like Any Other		
	Pavel Bazhov (1879–1950)	The Malachite Box	Commemorative coin featuring Bazhov	Bazhov in his youth
	Dmitry Begichev (1786–1855)	The Kholmsky Family		
	Alexander Bek (1903–1972)	And Not to Die; The Story of an Inventor; The New Appointment		
	Andrei Bely (1880–1934)	Petersburg; Kotik Letaev; The Silver Dove; Moscow	First edition of Petersburg, 1916	First edition of The Silver Dove, 1910
	Alexander Belyaev (1884–1942)	Professor Dowell's Head; Ariel; Amphibian Man	Drawing by Belyayev	Another of his drawings
	Nina Berberova (1901–1993)	The Accompanist; The Tattered Cloak; The Italics are Mine; The Book of Happiness	With her husband, 1925	
	Alexander Bestuzhev (1797–1837)	The Test; On Bivouac	1823 title page from Bestuzhev's magazine Polar Star	An engraving of Bestuzhev
	Vitaly Bianki (1894–1959)	Whose Nose is Better?		
	Aleksei Bibik (1878–1976)			
	Andrei Bitov (1937–2018)	Pushkin House; The Monkey Link; Life in Windy Weather; A Captive of the Caucasus		
	Nikolai Blagoveshchensky (1837–1889)	Before the Dawn		
	Pyotr Boborykin (1836–1921)	China Town		
	Alexander Bogdanov (1873–1928)	Red Star	A drawing of Bogdanov	
	Vladimir Bogomolov (1926–2003)	Ivan; The Moment of Truth		
	Yuri Bondarev (1924–2020)	Silence; The Shore; The Hot Snow		
	Leonid Borodin (1938–2011)	Partings; The Third Truth; The Story of a Strange Time; The Year of Miracle and Grief		
	Valery Bryusov (1873–1924)	The Fiery Angel; The Republic of the Southern Cross	A drawing of Bryusov	An Armenian stamp featuring Bryusov
	Yury Buida (born 1954)	The Zero Train; The Prussian Bride; Sinbad the Sailor		
	Mikhail Bulgakov (1891–1940)	The White Guard; The Master and Margarita; Heart of a Dog; The Fatal Eggs		Soviet stamp featuring Behemoth
	Kir Bulychev (1934–2003)	Half a Life; Great Gusliar; Earth and Elsewhere; Alisa Selezneva		
	Ivan Bunin (1870–1953)	Dry Valley; The Village; Dark Avenues; The Life of Arseniev	Soviet Nobel Laureates in Literature	

=== C ===
Portrait	Author	Notable works	Illustration	Illustration
	Aleksey Chapygin (1870–1937)	Stepan Razin	Stepan Razin, picture by Kustodiev	
	Sergei Charchoun (1888–1975)	Dolgolikov		
	Lidia Charskaya (1875–1938)	Princess Dzhavakha	Charskaya, c. 1910	
	Alexander Chekhov (1855–1913)		The Chekhov family	Alexander's son Michael Chekhov
	Anton Chekhov (1860–1904)	A Dreary Story; Ward No. 6 The Duel; Peasants	Title page from Collected Works Volume 2	An example from one of Chekhov's manuscripts
	Nikolay Chernyshevsky (1828–1889)	What Is to Be Done?	Title page of What Is to Be Done?	
	Evgeny Chirikov (1864–1932)	The Magician; Strained Relations; Marka of the Pits	At his desk, 1904	Portrait by Repin, 1906
	Lydia Chukovskaya (1907–1996)	Sofia Petrovna		
	Georgy Chulkov (1879–1939)		Chulkov (left), with fellow Soviet writers	

=== D ===
Portrait	Author	Notable works	Illustration	Illustration
	Yuli Daniel (1925–1988)	This is Moscow Speaking		
	Grigory Danilevsky (1829–1890)	Moscow in Flames; The Princess Tarakanova	Moscow in Flames	Princess Tarakanova by Konstantin Flavitsky
	Grigoriy Demidovtsev (born 1960)		Certificate of membership in the Union of Russian Writers	Demidovtsev in 2007
	Valentina Dmitryeva (1859–1947)	Hveska, The Doctor's Watchman	Dmitryeva, c. 1890	Dmitryeva, 1895
	Leonid Dobychin (1894–1936)	The Town of N Encounters with Lise	First edition cover	
	Yury Dombrovsky (1909–1978)	The Faculty of Useless Knowledge; The Keeper of Antiquities		
	Vlas Doroshevich (1864–1922)	Legends and Stories of the East	Doroshevich c.1910	
	Lyubov Dostoyevskaya (1869–1926)	The Emigrant	Anna Dostoyevskaya (wife of Fyodor Dostoyevsky) with their daughter Lyubov and son Fyodor	Anna Dostoyevskaya
	Fyodor Dostoyevsky (1821–1881)	Notes from Underground; Crime and Punishment; The Idiot; Demons; The Brothers Karamazov; The House of the Dead; The Gambler "White Nights" "A Gentle Creature" "The Dream of a Ridiculous Man"	Raskolnikov and Marmeladov from Crime and Punishment	Dostoyevsky's notes for chapter 5 of The Brothers Karamazov
	Mikhail Dostoyevsky (1820–1864)		Vremya (Time), the paper published by Fyodor and Mikhail Dostoyevsky	Portrait, 1870
	Sergei Dovlatov (1941–1990)	The Zone; Affiliate		
	Alexander Druzhinin (1824–1864)	Polinka Saks; The Story of Aleksei Dmitrich	Druzhinin (2nd from right), with his fellow writers from Sovremennik	Druzhinin in 1856
	Vladimir Dudintsev (1918–1998)	White Garments; A New Year's Tale; Not by Bread Alone		

=== E ===
Portrait	Author	Notable works	Illustration	Illustration
	Ilya Ehrenburg (1891–1967)	Julio Jurenito; The Thaw	Julio Jurenito	Photo of Ehrenburg
	Sergey Elpatyevsky (1854–1933)	Pity Me! The Homeless Ones		
	Asar Eppel (1935–2012)	The Grassy Street; Red Caviar Sandwiches		
	Victor Erofeyev (born 1947)	Russian Beauty; Life with an Idiot		
	Alexander Ertel (1855–1908)	The Specialist; A Greedy Peasant	Ertel, c. 1890	
	Mikhail Evstafiev (born 1963)	Two Steps from Heaven		

=== F ===
Portrait	Author	Notable works	Illustration	Illustration
	Alexander Fadeyev (1901–1956)	The Rout; The Young Guard		Soviet stamp featuring Fadeyev
	Konstantin Fedin (1892–1977)	Early Joys; The Conflagration; Cities and Years; No Ordinary Summer		
	Olga Forsh (1873–1961)	Palace and Prison; Pioneers of Freedom		
	Dmitry Furmanov (1891–1926)	Chapayev	Photo of Vasily Chapayev	Soviet stamp featuring Vasily Chapayev

=== G ===
Portrait	Author	Notable works	Illustration	Illustration
	Arkady Gaidar (1904–1941)	Chuk and Gek; The Blue Cup; Timur and his Gang	Soviet stamp featuring Gaidar	
	Nikolai Garin-Mikhailovsky (1852–1906)	Practical Training	Portrait by Israel Pass, 1905	Bas-relief dedication at the Laspi Pass
	Vsevolod Garshin (1855–1888)	Four Days; The Red Flower	The Red Flower	Photo of Garshin, 1877
	Gaito Gazdanov (1903–1971)	An Evening with Claire; Night Roads; The Spectre of Alexander Wolf	First edition of An Evening with Claire	
	Yuri German (1910–1967)	Ivan Lapshin; The Cause You Serve		
	Zinaida Gippius (1869–1945)	The Devil's Doll; Roman-Tzarevich	Portrait by Ilya Repin	
	Anatoly Gladilin (1935–2018)	Moscow Racetrack	Gladilin in Moscow, 2011	
	Fyodor Gladkov (1883–1958)	Cement; Restless Youth		
	Avdotia Glinka (1795–1863)	Countess Polina; Leonid Stepanovich and Liudmilla Sergeeva		
	Dmitry Glukhovsky (born 1979)	Metro 2033		
	Pyotr Gnedich (1855–1925)	The Burden of this World		
	Nikolai Gogol (1809–1852)	Dikanka; Taras Bulba; The Overcoat; Dead Souls	Title page of the first edition of Dead Souls, 1842	Nozdryov from Dead Souls
	Ivan Goncharov (1812–1891)	A Common Story; Oblomov; The Precipice	Title page of Oblomov	Title page of The Precipice
	Maxim Gorky (1868–1936)	Mother; Through Russia; Stories of 1922–1924; The Artamonov Business; The Life of Klim Samgin	With Leo Tolstoy	First publication of The Life of Klim Samgin in Krasnaya Nov, 1927
	Nina Gorlanova (born 1947)			
	Daniil Granin (1919–2017)	Into the Storm; Those Who Seek	With Dmitry Medvedev, 2009	
	Dmitry Grigorovich (1822–1900)	The Fishermen	Self-portrait of Grigorovich in his 20s	Portrait by Kramskoi
	Alexander Grin (1880–1932)	Scarlet Sails; The Seeker of Adventure	The Scarlet Sails celebration in St Petersburg	From the 2010 celebration
	Isabella Grinevskaya (1864–1944)			
	Vasily Grossman (1905–1964)	Stalingrad; Life and Fate; Forever Flowing	Memorial plaque in Donetsk	
	Elena Guro (1887–1913)	Autumnal Dream; The Hurdy-Gurdy; The Little Camels of the Sky	Guro's portrait of her husband Mikhail Matyushin	Elena and Mikhail
	Andrei Gusev (born 1952)	With Chronos' Permit; On the Edge of Magellanic Clouds; The World According to Novikoff	Andrei Gusev in Moscow, 2009	
	Sergey Gusev-Orenburgsky (1867–1963)	The Land of the Fathers; The Land of the Children		

=== H ===
Portrait	Author	Notable works	Illustration	Illustration
	Alexander Herzen (1812–1870)	Who is to Blame?	Statue of Herzen in Moscow	

=== I ===
Portrait	Author	Notable works	Illustration	Illustration
	Ilf and Petrov; Ilf (1897–1937); Petrov (1903–1942)	The Twelve Chairs; The Little Golden Calf	The Twelve Chairs Monument in Odesa	
	Fazil Iskander (1929–2016)	Chik and His Friends; Sandro of Chegem; The Gospel According to Chegem; The Thirteenth Labour of Hercules	Iskander with Russian President Dmitry Medvedev	Abkhazian coin featuring Iskander
	Alexei Ivanov (born 1969)			
	Vsevolod Ivanov (1895–1963)	Armoured Train 14-69; U The Kremlin; The Secret of Secrets		

=== K ===
Portrait	Author	Notable works	Illustration	Illustration
	Nikolay Karamzin (1766–1826)	Poor Liza	Poor Liza, painting by Orest Kiprensky, 1827	Stamp featuring Karamzin
	Nikolay Karazin (1842–1908)	The Two-Legged Wolf; From North to South	From North to South book cover	
	Nikolay Karonin-Petropavlovsky (1853–1892)	First Storm		
	Vladimir Karpov (1922–2010)	The Commander		
	Anna Kashina	In the Name of the Queen		
	Ivan Kataev (1902–1937)	The Wife; Immortality		
	Valentin Kataev (1897–1986)	Time Forward! The Embezzlers; A White Sail Gleams; The Cottage in the Steppe		
	Veniamin Kaverin (1902–1989)	Open Book; The Two Captains; The Unknown Artist		
	Emmanuil Kazakevich (1913–1962)	Star: A Story; The Blue Notebook		
	Yury Kazakov (1927–1982)	Going To Town; Adam and Eve		
	Yuri Khanon (born 1965)	Skryabin As a Face; Antedate Memories; Alphonse, who didn't was	Erik Satie, "Antedate Memories"	“Alphonse, who didn't was"
	Daniil Kharms (1905–1942)	The Old Woman		Caricature of Kharms by Antonovsky
	Nadezhda Khvoshchinskaya (1824–1889)	The Boarding School Girl	Photograph, c. 1880s	Engraving c. 1860s
	Sofia Khvoshchinskaya (1824–1865)	City Folk and Country Folk		
	Marusya Klimova (born 1961)		Klimova in 2006	
	Vsevolod Kochetov (1912–1973)	The Zhurbin Family; What Do You Want Then?		
	Ivan Kokorev (1825–1853)			
	Alexandra Kollontai (1872–1952)	Red Love; A Great Love; Love of Worker Bees	Soviet stamp featuring Kollontai	Kollontai in her youth
	Vladimir Korolenko (1853–1921)	Bad Company; Makar's Dream; The Blind Musician		The Korolenko Library in Kharkiv
	Sofia Kovalevskaya (1859–1891)	Nihilist Girl	Bust of Kovalevskaya	Commemorative coin
	Vadim Kozhevnikov (1909–1984)	Shield and Sword		
	Nadezhda Kozhevnikova (born 1949)	Attorney Alexandra Tikhonovna		
	Eugene Kozlovsky (1946–2023)			
	Vsevolod Krestovsky (1840–1895)	Knights of Industry	Krestovsky, c. 1870	
	Sigizmund Krzhizhanovsky (1887–1950)	Quadraturin		
	Anatoly Kudryavitsky (born 1954)			
	Aleksandr Kuprin (1870–1938)	The Duel; Yama: The Pit; The Bracelet of Garnets	A cartoon featuring Kuprin	Photo of Kuprin
	Andrey Kurkov (born 1961)	Death and the Penguin; Penguin Lost		
	Ivan Kushchevsky (1847–1876)	Nikolai Negorev	Portrait of Kushchevsky	
	Mikhail Kuzmin (1872–1936)	Wings	Portrait of Kuzmin by Alexander Golovin, 1910	Photo of Kuzmin
	Anatoly Kuznetsov (1929–1979)	Babi Yar		

=== L ===
Portrait	Author	Notable works	Illustration	Illustration
	Lazar Lagin (1903–1979)	The Old Genie Hottabych		
	Yulia Latynina (born 1966)	The Insider		
	Boris Lavrenyov (1891–1953)	The Forty-First; The Heavenly Cap; Such a Simple Thing; The Courageous Heart		
	Ivan Lazhechnikov (1792–1869)	The Heretic	Portrait of Lazhechnikov	
	Leonid Leonov (1899–1995)	The Badgers; Soviet River; The Thief; The Pyramid		
	Mikhail Lermontov (1814–1841)	A Hero of Our Time	Title page from the first edition of A Hero of Our Time, 1840	Pechorin's Duel from A Hero of Our Time. Picture by Mikhail Vrubel.
	Nikolai Leskov (1831–1895)	The Cathedral Folk; The Sealed Angel; The Enchanted Wanderer; Lady Macbeth of Mtsensk		Drawing of Leskov
	Alexander Levitov (1835–1877)	Leatherhide the Cobbler	Levitov, c. 1860s	
	Nikolay Leykin (1841–1906)	Our Folk Abroad	Photo of Leykin	
	Vladimir Lichutin (born 1940)			
	Eduard Limonov (1943–2020)	It's Me, Eddie; His Butler's Story; Memoir of a Russian Punk	At a book presentation, 2008	With Garry Kasparov at the Dissenters March in St. Petersburg, 2008
	Dmitri Lipskerov (born 1964)			
	Sergey Lukyanenko (born 1968)	Night Watch; Day Watch; Twilight Watch; Last Watch	Photo, 2001	
	Lev Lunts (1901–1924)	Native Land		

=== M ===
Portrait	Author	Notable works	Illustration	Illustration
	Grigori Machtet (1852–1901)			
	Vladimir Makanin (1937–2017)	Baize-Covered Table With Decanter		
	Osip Mandelstam (1891–1938)	The Egyptian Stamp	Mandelstam after arrest in 1934	
	Dmitry Mamin-Sibiryak (1852–1912)	Verotchka's Tales; A Gold Nugget; The Privalov Fortune	Cover of Verotchka's Tales	Title page of Verotchka's Tales
	Anatoly Marienhof (1897–1962)	Cynics	With the poet Sergei Yesenin, 1915	
	Alexandra Marinina (born 1957)			
	Boleslav Markevich (1822–1884)	The Turning Point		
	Vladilen Mashkovtsev (1929–1997)			
	Pavel Melnikov (1818–1883)			
	Dmitry Merezhkovsky (1865–1941)	Christ and Antichrist (trilogy)	Merezhkovsky (right), with his wife Zinaida Gippius and friend Dmitry Filosofov	Portrait by Repin, 1900
	Daniil Mordovtsev (1830–1905)	The Tsar and the Hetman		
	Viktor Muyzhel (1880–1924)	The Year		
	Viktor Muravin (born 1929)	The Diary of Vikenty Angarov		

=== N ===
Portrait	Author	Notable works	Illustration	Illustration
Monument to Nabokov at Montreux.	Vladimir Nabokov (1899–1977)	Mary; The Defense; The Gift; Lolita		Nabokov's first publication
	Yuri Nagibin (1920–1994)	The Pipe; Arise and Walk		
	Vasily Narezhny (1780–1825)	A Russian Gil Blas		
	Nikolay Naumov (1838–1901)	Strength Breaks the Straw		
	Andrei Navrozov (born 1956)			
	Viktor Nekrasov (1911–1987)	Front-line Stalingrad; Kira Georgievna		
	Vasily Nemirovich-Danchenko (1845–1936)	Peasant Tales of Russia		
	Alexander Neverov (1886–1923)	City of Bread	Drawing of Neverov	
	Friedrich Neznansky (1932–2013)	Red Square; Night Wolves		
	Nikolay Nosov (1908–1976)	Neznaika	Russian stamp featuring Neznaika	
	Alexey Novikov-Priboy (1877–1944)	Tsushima; The Captain; The Sea Beckons		

=== O ===
Portrait	Author	Notable works	Illustration	Illustration
	Vladimir Obruchev (1863–1956)	Plutonia; Sannikov Land		
	Vladimir Odoevsky (1803–1869)	Two Princesses; The Living Corpse; The Year 4338: Petersburg Letters	Odoevsky's dedication in a book he presented to Lermontov	Odoevsky (at back), with the composers Mily Balakirev (left) and Mikhail Glinka. Painting by Repin.
	Bulat Okudzhava (1924–1997)	A Taste of Liberty; Good-bye, Schoolboy! The Art of Needles and Sins		Stamp featuring Okudzhava
	Yury Olesha (1899–1960)	Envy; Three Fat Men; The Cherry Pit	1929 edition of Envy	
	Vladimir Orlov (1936–2014)	Danilov, the Violist		
	Nikolai Ostrovsky (1904–1936)	Born of the Storm; How the Steel Was Tempered	Stamp featuring Ostrovsky	
	Mikhail Osorgin (1878–1942)	Quiet Street; My Sister's Story		
	Valentin Ovechkin (1904–1968)	Greetings from the Front		

=== P ===
Portrait	Author	Notable works	Illustration	Illustration
	Marina Palei (born 1955)	Rendezvous	Palei in Komarovo	
	Ivan Panaev (1812–1862)	Lions in the Provinces	Portrait by Levitsky, 1856	
	Avdotya Panaeva (1820–1893)	A Woman's Lot		
	Vera Panova (1905–1973)	Seryozha; Looking Ahead; The Train; Span of the Year	Plaque for Panova in St. Petersburg	
	Boris Pasternak (1890–1960)	Doctor Zhivago; The Childhood of Luvers	Soviet Nobel Laureates in Literature	Memorial plaque at Pasternak's birthplace in Moscow
	Konstantin Paustovsky (1892–1968)	A Tale of Life (6 novel series)		
	Pyotr Pavlenko (1899–1951)	Happiness; Steppe Sunlight; The Lost Son		
	Oleg Pavlov (1970–2018)			
	Karolina Pavlova (1807–1893)	A Double Life	A drawing of Pavlova	
	Victor Pelevin (born 1962)	Omon Ra		
	Lyudmila Petrushevskaya (born 1938)	The Time: Night		
	Valentin Pikul (1928–1990)			
	Boris Pilnyak (1894–1938)	The Naked Year; The Death of the Army Commander; The Volga Falls into the Caspian Sea		
	Aleksey Pisemsky (1821–1881)	Nina; The Simpleton; One Thousand Souls; An Old Man's Sin	Portrait of Pisemsky, c.1860	Engraving of Pisemsky
	Andrei Platonov (1899–1951)	Chevengur; Dzhan; The Foundation Pit; Happy Moscow		
	Boris Polevoy (1908–1981)	He Came Back; We Are Soviet People; The Story of a Real Man		
	Nikolay Pomyalovsky (1835–1863)	Seminary Sketches	An engraving of Pomyalovsky	
	Ignaty Potapenko (1856–1929)	A Russian Priest; The General's Daughter	Potapenko (right), with Chekhov and Mamin-Sibiryak. c. 1895	
	Dmitri Prigov (1940–2007)	Live in Moskow		
	Zakhar Prilepin (born 1975)			
	Alexander Prokhanov (born 1938)	Empire's Last Soldier		
	Alexander Pushkin (1799–1837)	The Queen of Spades; The Captain's Daughter	The first page from the serialized version of The Captain's Daughter	

=== R ===
Portrait	Author	Notable works	Illustration	Illustration
	Alexander Radishchev (1749–1802)	Journey from St. Petersburg to Moscow	Title page from the first edition, 1790	
	Valentin Rasputin (1937–2015)	Money for Maria; Farewell to Matyora	Rasputin receiving an award from Russian Prime Minister Vladimir Putin	
	Aleksey Remizov (1877–1957)	The Clock; Sisters of the Cross; The History of the Tinkling Cymbal and Sounding Brass		
	Fyodor Reshetnikov (1841–1871)	The Podlipnayans	Drawing of Reshetnikov	
	Panteleimon Romanov (1884–1938)	Three Pairs of Silk Stockings; Without Bird-Cherry Blossoms		
	Mikhail Roshchin (1933–2010)	First Love; Twenty Minutes or So; The Devil's Wheel in Kobuleti		
	Dina Rubina (born 1953)	The Blackthorn	Dina Rubina, 2007	
	Anatoly Rybakov (1911–1998)	Children of the Arbat; Fear; Dust and Ashes		
	Vladimir Rybakov (1947–2018)	Creature; The Brand; The Burden; The Afghans		
	Vyacheslav Rybakov (born 1954)	Artist; The Trial Sphere		
	Maria Rybakova (born 1973)			

=== S ===
Portrait	Author	Notable works	Illustration	Illustration
	Irina Saburova (1907–1979)	Because of the Violets		
	German Sadulaev (born 1973)	I am a Chechen!		
	Ilya Salov (1834–1902)	Butuzka		
	Boris Savinkov (1879–1925)	The Pale Horse; What Never Happened		
	Mikhail Saltykov-Shchedrin (1826–1889)	The Golovlyov Family; The History of a Town; Modern Idyll; Old Years in Poshekhonye	Title page of the first edition of The Golovlyov Family	Ugryum-Burcheyev from The History of a Town
	Genrikh Sapgir (1928–1999)			
	Sergey Semyonov (1868–1922)	Gluttons; The Servant	Semyonov, c. 1900	
	Yulian Semyonov (1931–1993)	Seventeen Instants of Spring		
	Alexander Serafimovich (1863–1949)	Sand; Nikita; The Iron Flood; The Little Miner		
	Sergey Sergeyev-Tsensky (1875–1958)	Brusilov's Break-Through		
	Marietta Shaginyan (1888–1982)	Mess-Mend		
	Varlam Shalamov (1907–1982)	The Kolyma Tales		From the Shalamov Memorial Museum in Vologda
	Olga Shapir (1850–1916)	The Settlement		
	Tatiana Shchepkina-Kupernik (1874–1952)	Deborah		
	Alexander Sheller (1838–1900)	Putrid Moors		
	Mikhail Shishkin (born 1961)		In 2006	In 2010
	Vyacheslav Shishkov (1873–1945)	Children of Darkness		
	Ivan Shmelyov (1873–1950)	The Stone Age		
	Mikhail Sholokhov (1905–1984)	And Quiet Flows the Don	Mikhail Sholokhov	
	Ilya Shtemler (1933–2022)			
	Vasily Shukshin (1929–1974)	Stories from a Siberian Village		
	Konstantin Simonov (1915–1979)	Days and Nights; The Living and the Dead	In 1967	
	Andrei Sinyavsky (1925–1997)	Fantastic Stories		
	Stepan Skitalets (1869–1941)	The Blacksmith; The Love of a Scene Painter	With Maxim Gorky	Skitalets (left) with fellow Sreda members
	Vasily Sleptsov (1836–1878)	The Ward	An engraving of Sleptsov	
	Sofia Soboleva (1840–1884)	Pros and Cons		
	Sasha Sokolov (born 1943)	A School for Fools		
	Vladimir Sollogub (1813–1882)	The Snowstorm	Sollogub with fellow contributors to Sovremennik	
	Fyodor Sologub (1863–1927)	The Petty Demon; The Created Legend	Sologub in 1913	Sologub and Anastasia Chebotarevskaya
	Vladimir Soloukhin (1924–1997)	Verdict		
	Leonid Solovyov (1906–1962)	Tale of Hodja Nasreddin		
	Vsevolod Solovyov (1849–1903)			
	Aleksandr Solzhenitsyn (1918–2008)	The First Circle; Cancer Ward; The Red Wheel; One Day in the Life of Ivan Denisovich	Ivan Denisovich book cover	
	Orest Somov (1793–1833)	Mommy and Sonny		
	Vladimir Sorokin (born 1955)	The Queue; Day of the Oprichnik; Blue Lard		
	Konstantin Staniukovich (1843–1903)	Bobtail; Maximka; The Convict; Running to the Shrouds	Photo of Stanyukovich	
	Anna Starobinets (born 1978)			
Boris Strugatsky	Arkady and Boris Strugatsky; Arkady (1925–1991); Boris (1933–2012)	Prisoners of Power; The Kid from Hell; Hard to Be a God; Roadside Picnic		
	Mikhail Sushkov (1775–1792)	The Russian Werther		

=== T ===
Portrait	Author	Notable works	Illustration	Illustration
	Alexander Tarasov-Rodionov (1885–1938)	Chocolate		
	Nadezhda Teffi (1872–1952)	Time; Strangers; Close Friends	Teffi during World War 1	
	Nikolay Teleshov (1867–1957)	The Duel	Bust of Teleshov, 1956	Teleshov with members of the Sreda, 1902
	Vladimir Tendryakov (1923–1984)	Son-in-Law; Three, Seven, Ace		
	Sergey Terpigorev (1841–1895)	The Ice Broke		
	Nikolay Tikhonov (1896–1979)	War		
	Vladislav Titov (1934–1987)			
	Tatyana Tolstaya (born 1951)	The Slynx; White Walls		
	Aleksey K. Tolstoy (1817–1875)	Prince Serebrenni	Portrait by Ilya Repin	Monument to Tolstoy
	Aleksey N. Tolstoy (1883–1945)	Buratino; Aelita; Peter the First; The Hyperboloid of Engineer Garin	Stamp featuring the character Buratino	
	Leo Tolstoy (1828–1910)	The Cossacks; War and Peace; Anna Karenina; The Death of Ivan Ilyich	The ninth draft of the beginning of War and Peace	Title page of the first edition of Anna Karenina, 1878
	Edward Topol (born 1938)	Red Square		
	Yury Trifonov (1925–1981)	Another Life; The Old Man; The Disappearance; The Long Good-Bye		
	Gavriil Troyepolsky (1905–1995)	White Bim Black Ear		
	Alexei Tsvetkov (1947–2022)			
	Evgenia Tur (1815–1892)	Antonina; The Shalonski Family		
	Ivan Turgenev (1818–1883)	A Sportsman's Sketches; Home of the Gentry; On the Eve; Fathers and Sons	Title page of Fathers and Sons	Portrait by Ilya Repin
	Yury Tynyanov (1894–1943)	Lieutenant Kijé		

=== U ===
Portrait	Author	Notable works	Illustration	Illustration
	Anya Ulinich (born 1973)	Petropolis		
	Pavel Ulitin (1918–1986)			
	Lyudmila Ulitskaya (born 1943)	Sonechka; The Funeral Party; Medea and Her Children; Daniel Stein		
	Gleb Uspensky (1843–1902)	The Steam Chicken	Uspensky in his 20s, 1868	Soviet stamp featuring Uspensky
	Nikolay Uspensky (1837–1889)	Porridge; The Village Schoolmaster		

=== V ===
Portrait	Author	Notable works	Illustration	Illustration
	Pyotr Valuyev (1815–1890)		Engraving of Valuev, 1865	
	Konstantin Vaginov (1899–1934)	Goat Song; Works and Days of Svistonov	First edition cover of Goat Song	
	Tatiana Vedenska (born 1976)			
	Mikhail Veller (born 1948)	The Guru		
	Alexander Veltman (1800–1870)	The Wanderer	Veltman, c. 1830	
	Anastasiya Verbitskaya (1861–1928)	The Keys to Happiness	Verbitskaya, c. 1900	
	Vikenty Veresaev (1867–1945)	Sisters; The Deadlock; In the Steppe	With Leonid Andreyev	Painting of Veresayev by Sergey Malyutin, 1919
	Lidia Veselitskaya (1857–1936)	Mimi's Marriage		
	Igor Vishnevetsky (born 1964)	Leningrad; Non-Elective Affinities		
	Nikolai Virta (1906–1976)	Alone		
	Georgi Vladimov (1931–2003)	Faithful Ruslan		
	Vladimir Voinovich (1932–2018)	Moscow 2042; Private Ivan Chonkin		
	Zinaida Volkonskaya (1792–1862)	The Dream: A Letter		
	Alexander Volkov (1891–1977)	The Wizard of the Emerald City		
	Marko Vovchok (1833–1907)	Ukrainian Folk Tales	Ukrainian stamp featuring Vovchok	
	Julia Voznesenskaya (1940–2015)	The Women's Decameron		
	Alexander Vvedensky (1904–1941)	Murderers You are Fools	Vvedensky after arrest in 1941	

=== Y ===
Portrait	Author	Notable works	Illustration	Illustration
	Alexander Yakovlev (1886–1953)	The Peasant		
	Alexander Yashin (1913–1968)	A Feast of Rowan Berries		
	Ivan Yefremov (1908–1972)	Andromeda; Razor's Edge; The Bull's Hour; The Land of Foam		
	Dmitri Yemets (born 1974)	Tanya Grotter series		
	Venedict Yerofeyev (1938–1990)	Moscow-Petushki		
	Yevgeny Yevtushenko (1933–2017)	Wild Berries	On the right, with Richard Nixon	
	Semyon Yushkevich (1868–1927)		On the right with Yevgeny Chirikov	

=== Z ===
Portrait	Author	Notable works	Illustration	Illustration
	Mikhail Zagoskin (1789–1852)	Tales of Three Centuries	Engraving of Zagoskin.	
	Sergey Zalygin (1913–2000)	The South American Variant		
	Yevgeny Zamyatin (1884–1937)	We; A Provincial Tale	A Provincial Tale book cover.	Zamyatin, c.1919.
	Boris Zaytsev (1881–1972)	Anna		
	Ilia Zdanevich (1894–1975)	Rapture		
	Yulia Zhadovskaya (1824–1883)	The Backward Girl		
	Vera Zhelikhovsky (1835–1896)	The General's Will		
	Boris Zhitkov (1882–1938)	Viktor Vavich	First edition of Viktor Vavich	
	Maria Zhukova (1804–1855)	Evenings on the Karpovka		
	Zinovy Zinik (born 1945)	The Mushroom-Picker		
	Lydia Zinovieva-Annibal (1866–1907)	The Tragic Menagerie		
	Nikolay Zlatovratsky (1845–1911)	Old Shadows		
	Mikhail Zoshchenko (1895–1958)	Youth Restored; Blue Book; Before Sunrise	Before Sunrise	

== See also ==
- List of Russian-language writers
- List of Russian-language playwrights
- List of Russian-language poets
- List of Russian artists
- List of Russian architects
- List of Russian inventors
- List of Russian explorers
- Russian literature
- Russian language
- Russian culture
