= Khvoshchinsky =

Khvoshchinsky c.o.a.

Khvoshchinsky (masculine), Khvoshchinskaya (feminine) is a Russian surname belonging to the noble Khvoshchinsky family. Polish-language version: Chwoszczyński. Notable people with the surname include:

- Bogdan Khvoshchinsky (1842–1911), Russian general of cavalry and public figure
- Nadezhda Khvoshchinskaya (1821–1889), Russian novelist, poet, literary critic and translator
- Pavel Khvoshchinsky (1792–1852), Russian general
- Sofia Khvoshchinskaya (1824–1865), Russian writer of literary fiction and social commentary, a painter and translator
- Vladimir Khvoshchinsky (1856–1930) Russian military officer and politician
