= Rybakov =

Rybakov (masculine, Russian: Рыбаков) or Rybakova (feminine, Russian: Рыбаковa) is a Russian surname, which is derived from the Russian word "рыбак" (fisher, angler). Notable people with the surname include:

- Alex Rybakov (born 1997), American tennis player
- Alexey V. Rybakov, Russian carcinologist
- Anatoly Rybakov (1911–1998), Russian writer, author of Children of the Arbat and Heavy sand
- Anatoly Rybakov (swimmer) (born 1956), Russian swimmer
- Boris Rybakov (1908–2001), orthodox Soviet historian
- Igor Rybakov (born 1972), Entrepreneur
- Maria Rybakova (born 1973), Russian writer, granddaughter of Anatoly Rybakov
- Nikolay Rybakov (born 1978), Russian politician
- Richard Rybakov (born 1987), Diamondaire of Shira Diamonds, Marketing Firm Hashtag-Marketing
- Viktor Rybakov (born 1956), boxer of the USSR
- Vladimir Rybakov (1947–2018), Russian writer, author of The Afghans and Creature
- Vyacheslav Rybakov (born 1954), Russian science fiction writer and an orientalist
- Yaroslav Rybakov (born 1980), Russian athlete
