= Kushchevsky =

Kushchevsky may refer to:

- Ivan Kushchevsky, (1847-1876) Russian writer
- Kushchevsky District, Krasnodar Krai, Russia

== See also ==
- Kushchyovsky (disambiguation)
