= Sofia Soboleva =

Russian writer (c. 1840 – 1884)

Sofia Pavlovna Soboleva (Russian: София Павловна Соболева; 1840 – October 27, 1884) was a Russian writer who used the pseudonym V. Samoilovich (Russian: В. Самойлович). Soboleva wrote many short stories and children's fiction throughout her lifetime, but her most influential short story is "Pros and Cons," which explores themes of women's emancipation and education.

== Biography ==
=== Personal life ===
Soboleva was born in Shlisselburg between 1837 and 1840. While Soboleva's father was an engineer in their small town, it is possible that Soboleva had merchant relatives in Saint Petersburg by the name of Lavrov. She was educated at home until the age of eight, when she began to attend Madame Kamerat's Pension in St. Petersburg. There, a specific woman teacher had a lasting impression upon her, so much so that Soboleva remembered her and the school fondly.

Soboleva remained in St. Petersburg and began publishing her works in the 1860s under the male/androgynous pseudonym V. Samoilovich. Her early story "Pros and Cons" was published in 1863 by the journal Otechestvennye Zapiski while she was working in their editorial office as an assistant. In 1867, Soboleva began writing for children, abandoning her widely unnoticed short stories. In addition to writing for children, Soboleva devoted her time to the publication to early children's journals, such as Semeinye vechera and Detskoe chtenie. Her own children's fiction was published in journals such as Family Evenings (Semeinye vechera), Cordial Word (Zadushevnoe slovo), Readings for Children (DetCh), and The Spring (Rodnik). While Soboleva's short stories garnered little attention, her children's fiction was held in high esteem. Notable Russian writer Mikhail Saltykov-Shchedrin recommended Soboleva for a grant of 150 rubles from the Literary Fund in 1873 for her "literary labors which [brought] in a very negligible compensation."

Soboleva was married to a middle-class civil servant shortly after she finished school, however the length of their marriage is unknown. After their marriage ended, she supported herself by working as a private teacher. Soboleva either had children with her husband, which she was left to support after their separation, or she fostered "a brood of poor children," pouring her resources into their care and education. As "every available copek" went to the care of these children, Soboleva endured financial difficulty for most of her life. Critics speculate that her turn to the more lucrative market of children's fiction can be explained by her dedication to raise money for their care. She died in St. Petersburg on October 27, 1884 and was buried in the vault of P. I. Lavrov.

=== Literary Work ===
Soboleva's early works, which consisted of numerous short stories and a novella, comment on the education and opportunities available to women, while her later works are targeted towards children. Her most well known short story, "Pros and Cons: The Thoughts and Dreams of Madame Court Counsellor Lisitsyna" is narrated by a middle-aged woman who self-proclaims to be "emancipated" and "a progressive." Lisitsyna is wealthy, independent of her husband, whom she married late in life. The story begins with a delve into the narrator's early life, most importantly, her education and her first romantic experience. As the story progresses, the narrator depicts two distinct women, the lower-class, uneducated, yet high-minded Lyubinka and the fashionably educated, yet morally reprehensible Zina. Lisitsyna attempts to guide Lyubinka and her fiancé Yakov as Zina steals his affection with the intention of tossing him aside. The story ends with Lyubinka rejecting Yakov's returned affections once he realizes that Zina does not return his love. Partway through this love triangle, the narrator pauses the narrative to discuss the state of women's education and opportunities in Russia.

Soboleva's most autobiographical story is "Another Broken Heart." Like her heroine, Soboleva was educated at a pension in St. Petersburg and came from a middle-class family. The heroine, Varia, is impressed by a woman teacher at her school, who is a George Sand enthusiast. Unfortunately, Varia who is "sensitive and haughty," is entrapped by a summer visitor, who carts her off to St. Petersburg. After Varia is cast off by her lover she fails to find employment as a fallen woman and eventually dies of consumption.

"How Stesha Came to Saint Petersburg" is Soboleva's most popular work of children's fiction. Stesha, a servant girl, gives a first-person account of her life, a rare perspective to encounter in nineteenth century fiction.

=== Critical reception ===
During the 1860s, when Soboleva began producing her work, an increase in educational opportunities for women in Russian, as Women's rights movements gained traction, lead to an increase in literary works written by women. Some of the most prominent women writers of this time include Evgeniia Tur, Nadezhda and Sof'ia Khvoshchinskaia, Aleksandra Kobiakova, Avdot'ia Panaeva, and Nadezhda Sokhanskaia.

While Soboleva's adult prose did not garner any critical attention during her lifetime, prominent Russian scholar Catriona Kelly delves into her most masterful story, according to Kelly, in "The First-Person 'Other': Sof'ia Soboleva's 1863 Story 'Pros and Cons' (I pro, i contra)." Kelly compares Soboleva's first person narrative to Fyodor Dostoevsky's Notes from Underground, considering their use of first person narration. Kelly's analysis examines the three distinct modes of autobiography that both Soboleva and Dostoevsky use: the confession, the apologia, and the memoir. Kelly's article argues that "Pros and Cons" is a "fictional autobiography," not "in the sense of life transmuted as art, this text is 'fictional autobiography' in another, and perhaps more critically enabling sense."

== Publications ==
- "Another Broken Heart" (Eshche razbitoe serdtse) was published by Biblioteka dlia chteniia in 1862.
- Soboleva's most well-known prose piece, "Pros and Cons" (I pro, i contra), was first published by Otechestvennye zapiski in 1863 and was most recently published in An Anthology of Russian Women's Writing in 1994.
- "A Hopeless Situation" or "An Impossible Position" (Bezvykhodnoe polozhenie) was published by Russkoe Slovo in 1864.
- "No Escape" was published in 1864.
- Soboleva's only novella, The Good Old Days (Dobroe staroe vremia), was published by Russkoe slovo in 1865.
- "Polly's Story" or "The Story of Polya" (Istoriia Poli) was published in 1866 and most recently republished in 1987 by Svidanie: proza russkikh pisatel'nits 1860–1880 godov 19-go stoletiia.
- Three of Soboleva's prose works, "Natasha Gordeeva," "The Surprise" (Siurpriz), and "Shmuel" were also published sometime before 1867, when Soboleva turned to writing for children.
- Soboleva's most notable work for children, "How Stesha Came to Petersburg" (Kak Stesha v Peterburg priekhala), was published in 1874 by Na pamiat' starogo goda: rasskazy i povesti dlia detei.
- In 1874, Soboleva, along with V. Sorokina, adapted Abd al-Rahman ash-Sharqawi's Arabic novel al-Fallah (The Peasant), which was published as Sketches of Contemporary Egypt (Ocherki sovremennogo Egipta.
- DetCh published Soboleva's Russian translation of George Eliot's English novel The Mill on the Floss in 1878.
- An anthology of Soboleva's work, Cherished Stories (Zavetnye rasskazy), was reprinted in 1909, twenty-five years after her death.
