= Bibik =

Bibik may refer to:

- A traditional Indo-Portuguese dessert also known as Bebinca

== People with the surname ==
- Aleksei Bibik (1878–1976), a Russian novelist
- Olha Bibik (born 1990), Ukrainian sprinter
- Tatjana Bibik (born 1985), Russian badminton player
- Valentin Bibik (1940-2003), a Ukrainian composer
