= Biznes Segodnya =

- Categories: Business
- Frequency: Monthly
- Publisher: Grigoriy Demidovtsev
- Founded: 2001
- Country: Saint Petersburg, Russia
- Language: Russian
- Website: Biznes Segodnya

Biznes Segodnya (Russian: Бизнес сегодня; literally: Business Today) is a full-color monthly Russian language business magazine published by Grigoriy Demidovtsev. Based in Saint Petersburg, it is primarily focused on local business issues, local and international legislation and cultural events. It is circulated to chief accountants, financial directors and top managers of 3000 companies in Saint Petersburg through a selective distribution method, as well as St. Petersburg Government Executives and members of the Legislative Assembly of Saint Petersburg. The magazine has a total circulation of 10,000.
