= Zajączkowski =

Zajączkowski (feminine: Zajączkowska) is a Polish surname. Notable people include:

- Andrzej Zajączkowski (1922–1994), Polish sociologist, culture anthropologist, Africanist
- Bolesław Zajączkowski (1891–1920), Polish lawyer and reserve officer of the Polish Army
- Christian Zajaczkowski (born 1961), French former footballer and manager
- Grzegorz Zajączkowski (born 1980), Polish sprinter
- Małgorzata Zajączkowska (born 1956), Polish actress
- Piotr Zajączkowski (born 1966), Polish football player and manager
- Władysław Zajączkowski (1837–1898), Polish mathematician
- Wojciech Zajączkowski (born 1963), Polish historian, diplomat

== Zajančkauskas ==
- Vladas Zajančkauskas (1915–2013), Lithuanian war criminal

== Zayonchkovsky ==
In Russian Empire, the Polish surname was Russified as Зайончковский/Зайончковская.

- Andrei Zayonchkovski (1862–1926), Russian general
- Nikolay Zayonchkovsky (1859–1920), Russian state official
- Zayonchkovskaya was the married surname of Nadezhda Khvoshchinskaya (1821–1889), Russian novelist, poet, literary critic and translator
- Oleg Zayonchkovsky (born 1959), Russian author
