= Kushchyovsky =

Kushchyovsky (masculine), Kushchyovskaya (feminine), or Kushchyovskoye (neuter) may refer to:

- Kushchyovsky District, a district of Krasnodar Krai, Russia
- Kushchyovskaya, a rural locality (a stanitsa) in Krasnodar Krai, Russia
