= Vera Panova =

Soviet and Russian writer, novelist and playwright

- Born: Vera Fyodorovna Panova; 20 March 1905; Rostov-on-Don, Don Host Oblast, Russian Empire
- Died: 3 March 1973 (aged 67); Leningrad, Russian SFSR, Soviet Union
- Spouses: Arseny Staroselsky; Boris Vakhtin (died) David Ryvkin (m. 1945)
- Children: Boris Vakhtin; Yuri Vakhtin
- Writing career
- Genres: Fiction, drama
- Notable works: Seryozha; The Train; Looking Ahead; Span of the Year
- Notable awards: Stalin Prize

Signature
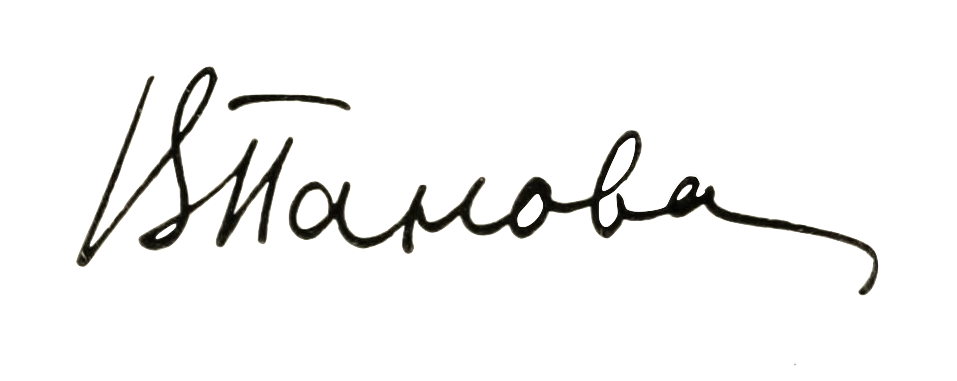

Vera Fyodorovna Panova (Russian: Вера Фёдоровна Панова; 20 March [O.S. 7 March] 1905 – 3 March 1973) was a Soviet and Russian writer, novelist and playwright. She was a recipient of the Stalin Prize in 1947, 1948 and 1950.

== Early life ==
Vera was born into the family of an impoverished merchant (later an accountant) in Rostov-on-Don. Her father, Fyodor Ivanovich Panov, built canoes and yachts as a hobby, and founded two yachting clubs in Rostov. When she was five, her father drowned in the Don River. After her father's death, her mother worked as a saleswoman. As a girl, she was taught by a family friend, an old school teacher named Anna Prozorovskaya. Vera credited Anna with instilling in her a passion for reading. Anna died after being with Vera for only a year. Prior to the October Revolution she studied for 2 years at a private gymnasium, before her formal education was stopped because of money problems in her family.

From her earliest years, Vera was an avid reader, especially of poetry, at which she tried her hand at an early age. Her reading included the works of Alexander Pushkin, Nikolai Gogol, and Ivan Turgenev. She also read numerous textbooks on science, geography, and history as a form of self-education. At the age of 17, she started working as a journalist on the Rostov newspaper Trudovoy Don (Working Don), publishing articles as V. Staroselskaya (the surname of her first husband Arseny Staroselsky whom she had married in 1925 and divorced 2 years later) and Vera Veltman. She described her first editing job and her first steps in this career in her novel Sentimental Romance (1958). She learned newspaper work by experience, serving in turn as an assistant to the district organizer of labor correspondents, a reporter, and an essayist.

== Career ==
In 1933, she began writing plays. In 1935, her second husband, Komsomolskaya Pravda journalist Boris Vakhtin, was arrested and imprisoned on Solovki where he died (the exact death date is unknown, probably the later thirties). The Gulag authorities allowed her only one meeting with Boris, which she described in her story Svidanie (The Meeting).

From 1940, she lived in Leningrad. The unexpected advance of the Nazis on the Leningrad Front found her in Tsarskoye Selo. She and her daughter were put in a concentration camp near Pskov, but they managed to escape to Narva, where they lived illegally in a destroyed synagogue. She then moved to the village of Shishaki to stay with relatives. There she began her first serious works, the plays Ivan Kosogor (1939) and In Old Moscow (1940). Although these 2 plays won prizes, Vera felt that the dramatic form confined her, and, by her own admission, she was unable to fit all that she wanted to say into its strict framework. She felt that she could work with greater freedom in the novel and story forms.

In 1943, when the Germans retreated from Ukraine, she moved to Molotov (now Perm). She worked for a local newspaper and published her first novel The Pirozhkov Family (later renamed Yevdokia, the source of a Soviet film produced by Tatyana Lioznova in 1961). In 1944, as a journalist, she was embedded for two months with a hospital train about which she wrote the novel Sputniki (1946; translated as The Train) that brought her a Stalin Prize first degree (1947). There was a Soviet film Poezd miloserdiya (Train of Mercy, 1961) and another TV-film Na vsyu ostavshuyuysya zhizn (For the Rest of One's Life, 1975) based on the novel; the scenario for the later film was written by Panova's son Boris Vakhtin.

In 1945, she married David Yakovlevich Ryvkin (1910–1980), a notable Russian science-fiction writer who wrote under the pseudonym of "David Dar". Together with her husband and his two children and her own family, she returned to Leningrad. In 1947, she published the novel Kruzhilikha, translated as Looking Ahead (Stalin Prize second degree, 1948), about people working in a Ural factory. She had begun writing the novel in 1944, but had been interrupted by the hospital train assignment. In 1949, she wrote the novel Yasny Bereg (Bright Shore; Stalin Prize third degree, 1950) about people working in a kolkhoz.

With the onset of the Khrushchev Thaw she wrote Vremena Goda (Span of the Year, 1953) about the relations of fathers and sons within the Soviet intelligentsia. The novel was immensely popular with the reading public, but Panova was criticized harshly in the press for her "naturalism" and "objectivism". In 1955, she wrote the novel Seryozha, one of the best works about children in Soviet literature. She published the stories Valya and Volodya, also about children, in 1959.

Panova held a place among the top Soviet writers. At the Writer's Congresses of 1954 and 1959, she was elected as a member of the Presidium of the Union of Soviet Writers. She was twice awarded the Order of the Red Banner of Labour (1955, 1965). As an established writer, she was allowed to travel to England, Scotland, and Italy, and in 1960 she toured the United States. Her published travel notes and articles, and an epilogue to the Russian translation of The Catcher in the Rye, by J. D. Salinger, show her affinity for Western life and culture.

== Later life ==
In her later life, she published many works of fiction (most of them autobiographical or based on Russian history of the 17th century), plays, and film scripts. She helped many younger writers who later become famous, among them Yury Kazakov, Sergei Dovlatov (her secretary for many years), Viktor Konetzky, Andrei Bitov, and Viktor Golyavkin. Her son Boris Vakhtin (1930–1981) was a notable dissident and Russian writer, the founder of the group Gorozhane.

In 1967, she suffered a stroke that left her partially paralyzed. Though incapacitated, she continued to work with the help of her family and a number of secretaries until the day of her death. Vera Panova died in Leningrad in 1973 and is buried in Komarovo near Anna Akhmatova.

== English translations ==
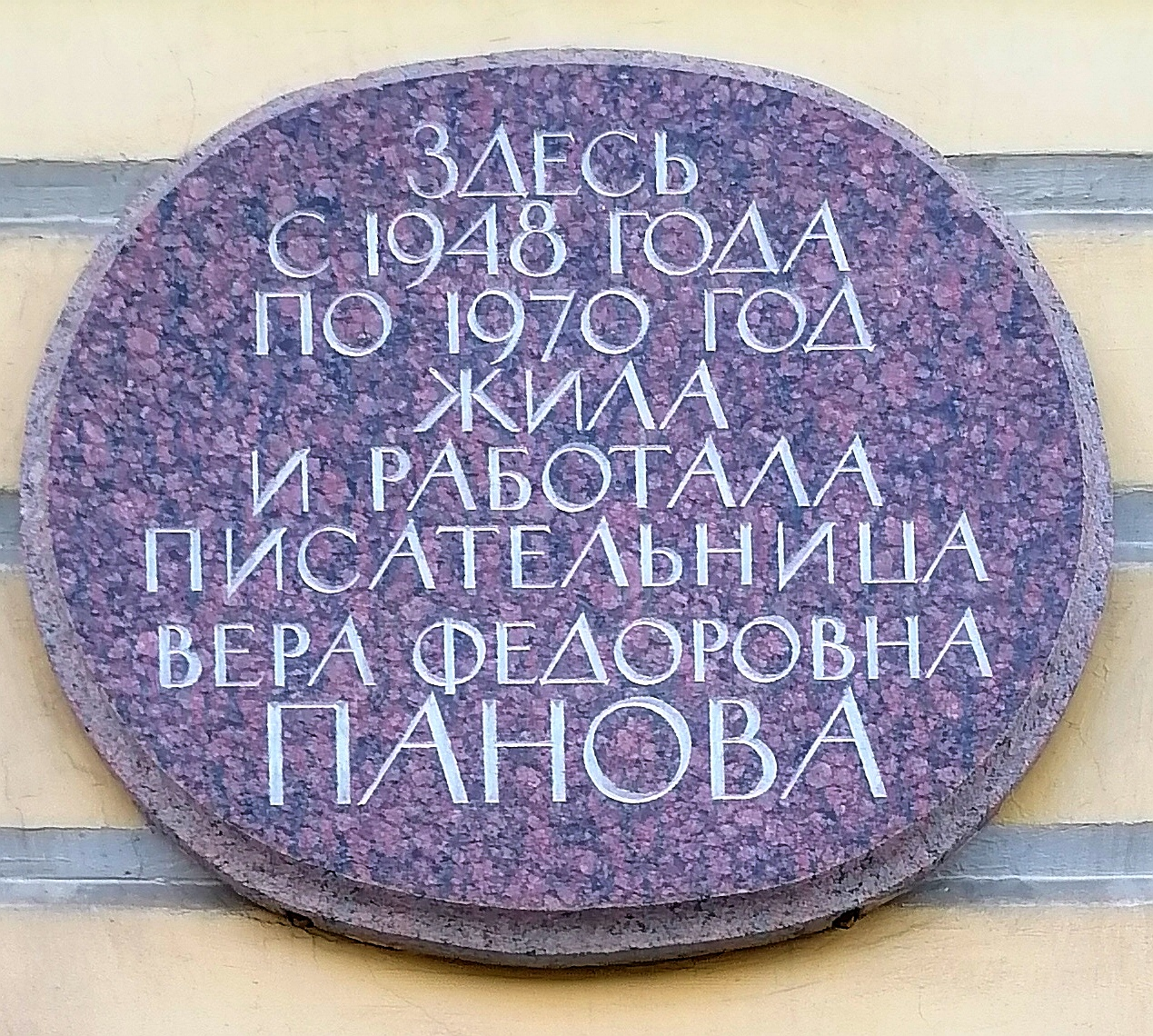
Commemorative plaque for Panova in Saint Petersburg.

- Looking Ahead, (novel), Progress Publishers, Moscow, 1947. from Archive.org
- The Factory, (novel), Putnam, 1949.
- The Train, (novel), Alfred A. Knopf, 1949. from Archive.org
- Span of the Year, (novel), Harvill Press, 1957.
- Time Walked, (novel), Harvill Press, 1957.
- A Summer to Remember, (novel), Thomas Yoseloff, 1962.
- Selected Works, (includes the novel The Train, the short novel Seryozha, and the stories Valya and Volodya), Progress Publishers, Moscow, 1976.
- Three Boys at the Gate, (story), Anthology of Soviet Short Stories, Volume 2, Progress Publishers, Moscow, 1976.
- Yevdokia, (novel), Foreign Languages Publishing House, Moscow.
