= Yulia Zhadovskaya =

Russian poet and writer

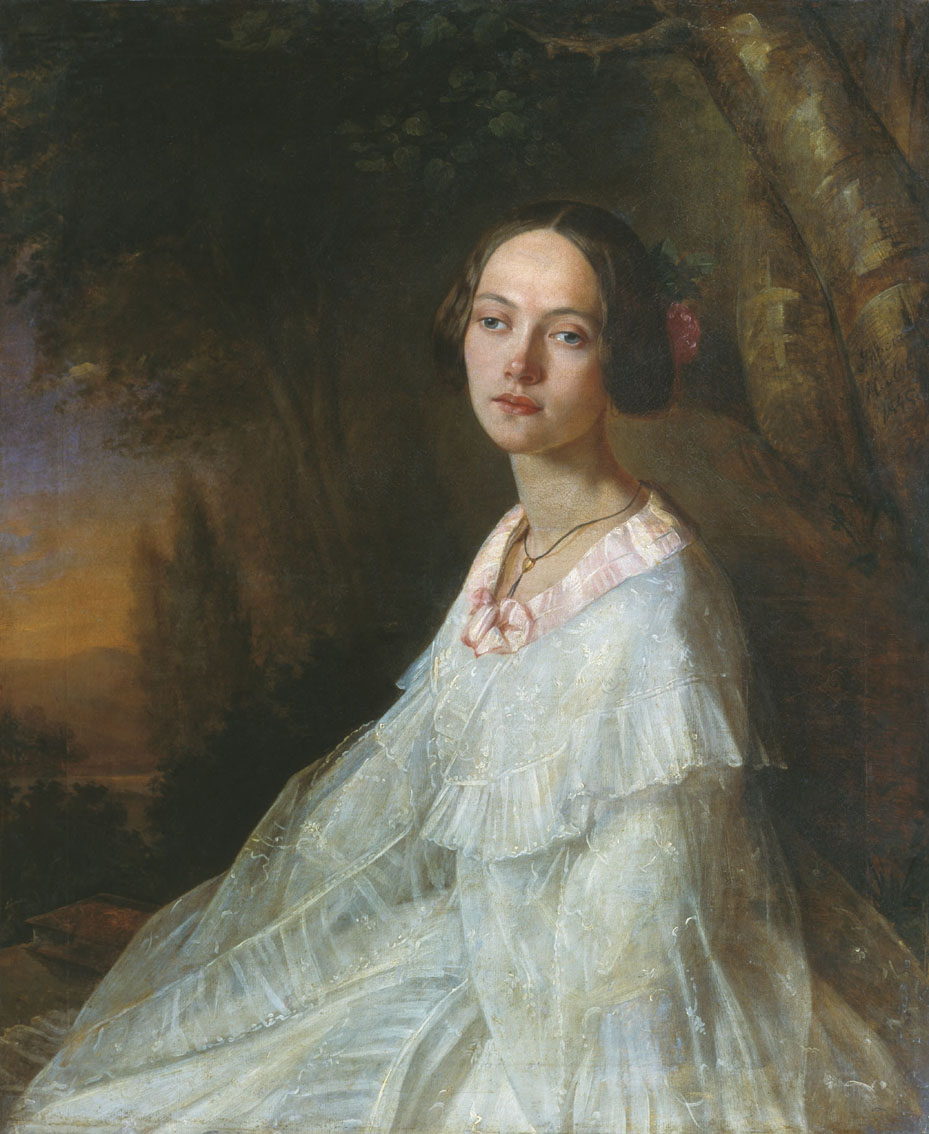
- Portrait by Nikolay Lavrov, 1845.
- Born: July 11, 1824; Yaroslavl Province, Russia
- Died: August 9, 1883 (aged 59); Kostroma Province, Russia

Yulia Valerianovna Zhadovskaya (Russian: Ю́лия Валериа́новна Жадо́вская; 11 July 1824 [O.S. 29 June] – 9 August 1883 [O.S. 28 July]) was a Russian poet and writer of fiction.

== Biography ==
Zhadovskaya was born disabled; she had no left arm and was missing several fingers on her right hand. Her mother, who had graduated from the prestigious Smolny Institute, and who died when Yulia was only 3, was very protective of Yulia because of her disability. At her death Yulia's mother asked Yulia's grandmother to take special care of her. Yulia also lived with and studied French with her aunt, the poet Anna Gotovtsova, who had written an epigram challenging Alexander Pushkin's depiction of women.

At the age of 19 Yulia adopted Gotovtsova's daughter Fyodorova, who became her amanuensis and close friend until Yulia's death. Fyodorova, in her memoir of Yulia, presents her as a strong and determined woman who overcame her disabilities to become a successful poet and writer. Several of Yulia's poems were made into popular songs. She married a family friend at the age of 38. From the time of her marriage until her death at 59 she wrote no more poetry. Fyodorova suggested that the marriage may not have been a happy one.

== Legacy ==
Zhadovskaya's best work is her love and nature lyric poetry. Nikolay Nekrasov's poetry influenced her work of the late 1840s and the 1850s. Zhadovskaya's lyric poetry is part of the folksong tradition. Among her poems made into popular songs was Cornfield, My Cornfield, My Golden Cornfield, set to music by Mikhail Glinka and Alexander Dargomyzhsky. Her novel Aloof From the Social Whirl (1857) and her stories are devoted to the problems of love, marriage, and the emancipation of women. A raznochintsy intellectual is the subject of her story The Backward Girl (1861).

== Poem ==
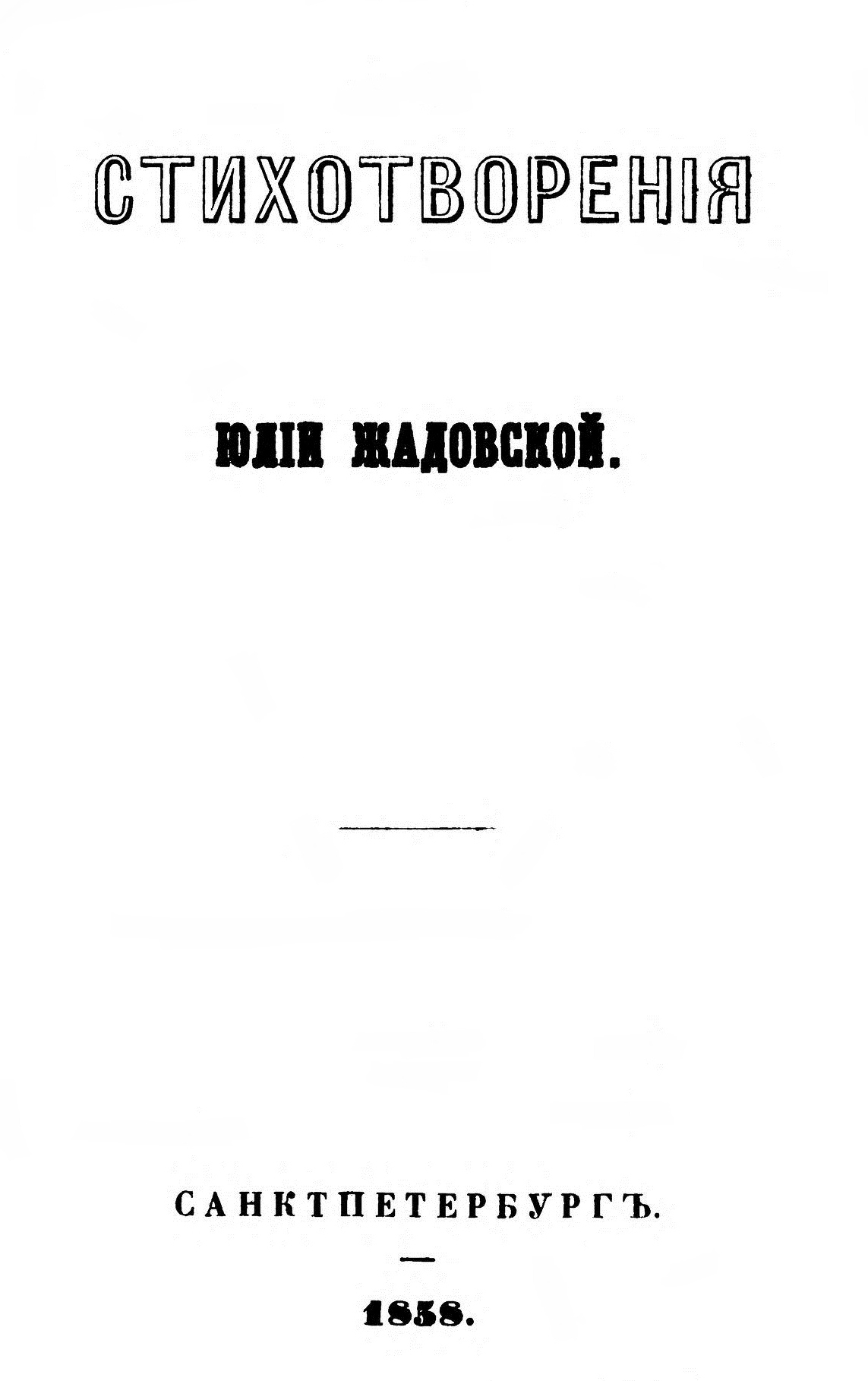
Title page of Zhadovskaya's collection Poems, published in Saint Petersburg, 1858

The Contrast

Dear, you will soon forget me,
You I shall ne'er forget,
You'll find new loves for old ones,
For me love's sun is set.

New faces soon will greet you,
You'll choose yourself new friends,
New thoughts you'll get and haply
New joy to make amends:

While I in silent sorrow
Life's joyless way shall go,
And how I love and suffer
Only the grave will know.
