= Grigoriy Demidovtsev =

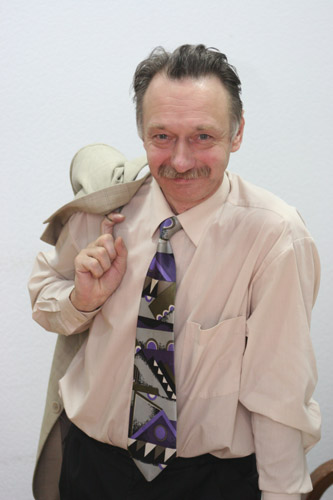
Demidovtsev in 2007

Grigoriy Demidovtsev (Russian: Григорий Демидовцев) is the pen name of Grigoriy Anatolyevich Petrov (Russian: Григорий Анатольевич Петров) (born 1960), a Russian fiction writer and a playwright. Since 2001 he publishes Biznes Segodnya. In 2014 he was awarded the A. K. Tolstoy Literary Prize.

== Books ==
Demidovtsev wrote eight books of novels and a collection of stageplays:

- Breath of the Future
- Breath of the Past
- Russ we hadn't known about
- Breath of the Eternity
- The Little Bow
- The Demon of Temptation
- The Black Angel. In a Boat of Death
- Russian Mystery
- Plays

Some of them were translated into English to be collected in Fantastic stories.

== Nevoruss ==
In the Breath of the Past and Russ we hadn't known about, Demidovtsev depicts a fictional European country named Nevoruss. "Nevoruss" is the Russian word for "Neva Russ", literally "Russ at the Neva river". Nevoruss is considered to be a successor state of the medieval Novgorod Republic. It managed to avoid Muscovite conquest in the 15th century and due to commercial activity of its inhabitants continued to thrive. Thus Russia had never united, so its place shares Nevoruss and Muscovy. Their opposition resembles that of Jesusland and the United States of Canada. Besides Russian territories Nevoruss due to its early colonial expansion also controlled the Baltic states, Scandinavia with Iceland and Greenland, some parts of North America (including Alaska and the whole Canada) as well as some important islands (among them Cuba, Canaries and Hawaiian Islands).
