= Leonid Dobychin =

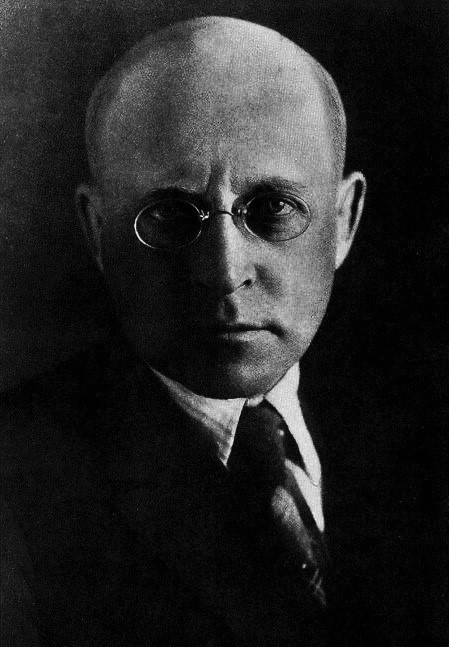
- Born: Leonid Ivanovich Dobychin; June 17 [O.S. June 5] 1894; Ludza, Vitebsk Governorate, Russian Empire
- Died: after 26 April 1936 (aged 41); Leningrad, Russian SFSR, Soviet Union (?)
- Citizenship: Russian Empire (1899–1917); Soviet Russia (1917–1922); Soviet Union (1922–1934)
- Occupations: Poet, writer
- Writing career
- Notable works: The Town of N Encounters with Lise

Leonid Ivanovich Dobychin (Russian: Леони́д Ива́нович Добы́чин) (June 17 [O.S. June 5] 1894, Ludza, Vitebsk Governorate — March 28, 1936 [?]) was a Russian and Soviet writer.

== Early life ==
The author's father was Ivan Andrianovich Dobychin (1855—1902), who in 1896 moved the family to Dvinsk (now Daugavpils); his mother, Anna Aleksandrovna, was a well-known midwife in Dvinsk. Leonid had two younger brothers and two sisters. He studied in the Dvinsk Modern School (a non-classical high school), and in 1911 entered Saint Petersburg Polytechnical University, graduating in 1916. In 1918 he moved to Bryansk, where he worked as a teacher and statistician.

== Career ==
His first stories were published in 1924 in the Leningrad journal Russkii sovremennik. In the autumn of 1925 Dobychin made his first, unsuccessful, attempt to relocate to Leningrad. At this time he came to know the Chukovskys; later he became acquainted with a wide circle of authors, including Mikhail Slonimsky, Veniamin Kaverin, Yury Tynyanov, Evgeny Shvarts, Gennady Gor, and Leonid Rakhmanov. His story collections Vstrechi s Liz (Encounters with Lise, 1927) and Portret (The Portrait, 1931) portray the clash of the former Russian world with the new Soviet reality; they exemplify a lyrical "antipsychologism." In his only novel, The Town of N (1935), a boy recalls his family, school, and romances and the Russo-Japanese War; his village is modeled on "the town of N" from Gogol's Dead Souls. When the novel was published, it did not attract the attention of the censors, but the following year it was the object of vicious criticism in an attack on formalism among Leningrad writers. After the stormy meeting of the Leningrad Writers' Union on March 25, 1936, Dobychin disappeared; he is presumed to have committed suicide, and his body was fished out of the Neva River months later.

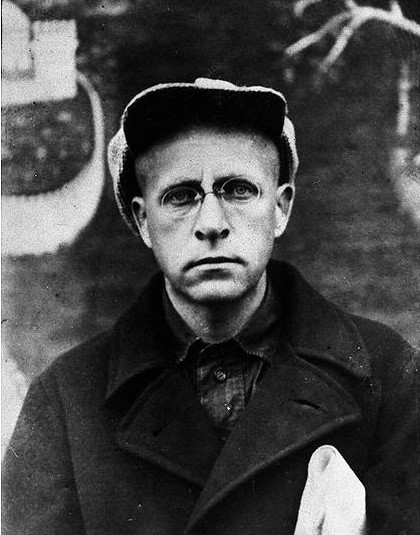
Dobychin, some time before his disappearance

Solomon Volkov wrote:

A writer who surpassed Zoshchenko in a desire for simplicity and laconic writing was Leonid Dobychin, a remote and lonely man who managed to produce three small books before vanishing in 1936... Dobychin's works, which were greatly esteemed among Leningrad writers, were met with hostility by the critics as collections of "man-in-the-street gossip, foul anecdotes and operetta episodes." A critic reviewing Dobychin's book fumed, "The streets of Leningrad are filled with various people, most of whom are healthy, life-loving and energetic builders of socialism, but the author writes: 'Gnats bustled.'" ... Dobychin's work was an extreme expression of the attempts by some masters of the new Petersburg prose to achieve simplicity and a laconic tone.

The same author said, "In Leningrad, people compared him to Joyce and Proust, although he wrote microscopic stories." Kaverin wrote, "The author — indignant, ironic, pained by the vulgarity of some and the unconscious cruelty of others — is clearly visible on every page." And, according to Boris Lanin, "Dobychin's experimentalism was not understood by his contemporaries, as it adhered neither to the dictates of socialist realism nor imitated the ornamental prose of Pil'niak and Zamiatin, and he remained on the periphery of Russian literary life." Dobychin's work was not republished in Russia until 1989.

== Translations ==
- Richard Chandler Borden and Natalia Belova (tr.), The Town of N (Northwestern University Press, 1998), ISBN 0-8101-1589-1
- Richard Chandler Borden and Natalia Belova (tr.), Encounters with Lise and other stories (Northwestern University Press, 2005), ISBN 0-8101-1972-2
