= Fazil Iskander =

Soviet and Russian writer (1929–2016)

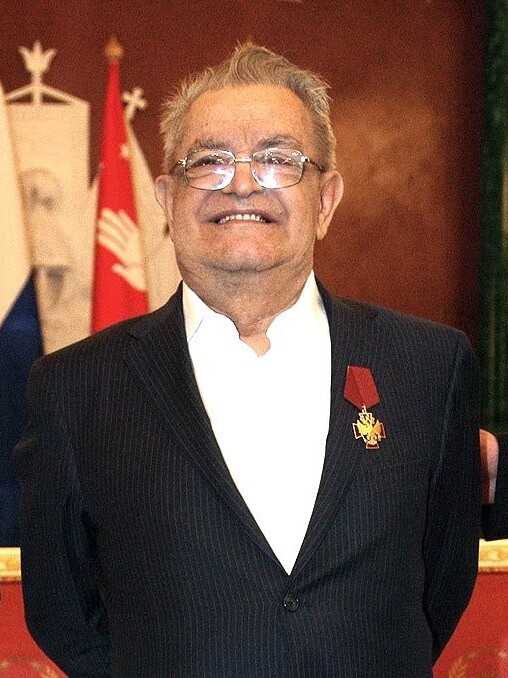
- Iskander being awarded the Order of Merit for the Fatherland, 2010
- Born: Искандер, Фазиль Абдулович; Fazil Abdulovich Iskander; 6 March 1929; Sukhumi, SSRA, TSFSR, USSR
- Died: 31 July 2016 (aged 87); Peredelkino, Russia
- Occupations: Novelist, essayist, poet
- Relatives: Abdul Ibragimovich Iskander (father); Leili Khasanovna Iskander (mother); Feredun Abdulovich Iskander (brother); Giuli Abdulovna Iskander (sister)
- Writing career
- Genres: memoirs, satire, parable, essays, aphorism
- Notable work: Sandro of Chegem
- Notable awards: USSR State Prize 1989; Alfred Toepfer foundation's Pushkin Prize 1992; State Prize of the Russian Federation 1993, 2013; Triumph Prize (Russia) 1999; Order "For Merit to the Fatherland" 1999, 2004, 2010; Order of Honour and Glory, 1st class (Abkhazia) 2002; Yasnaya Polyana Literary Award 2011; Ivan Bunin literary award 2013

Signature
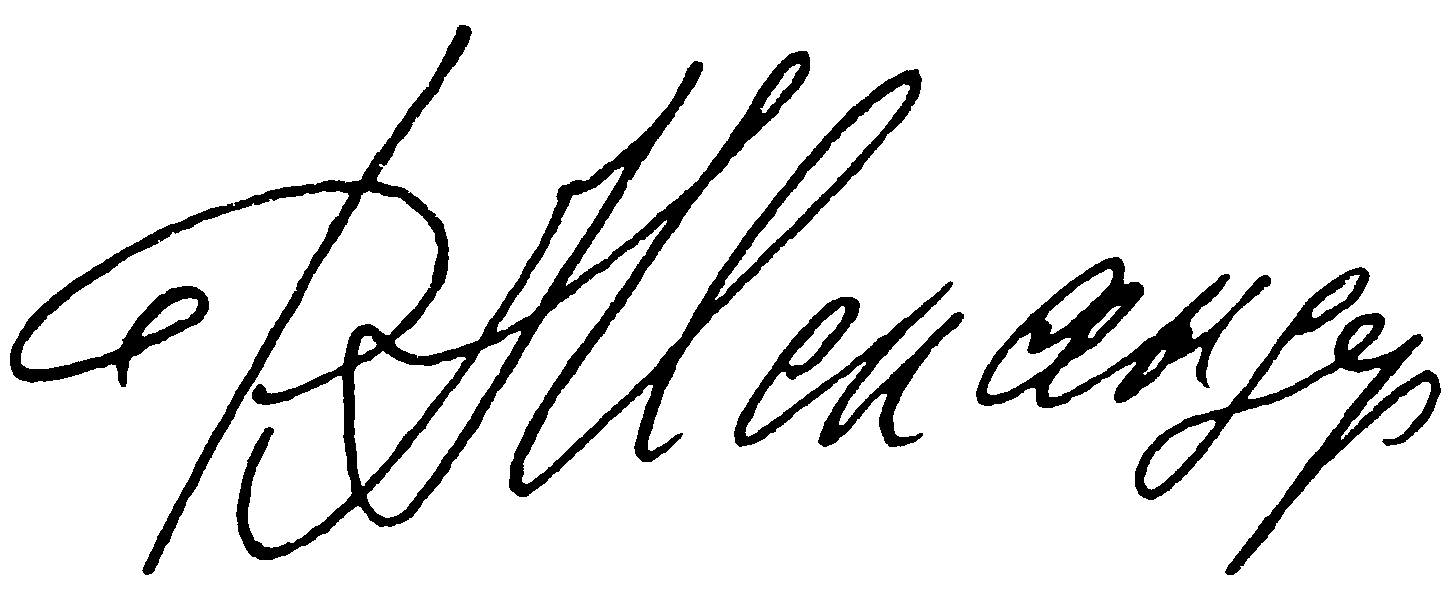

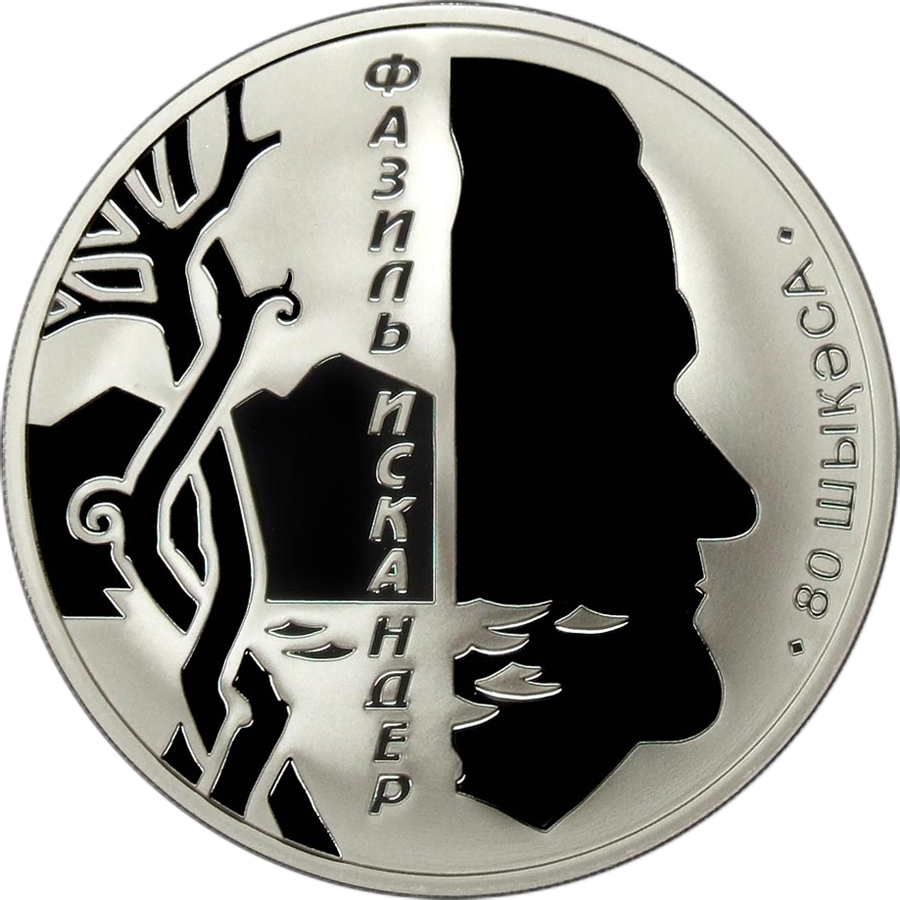
Reverse side of a 10 apsar commemorative coin minted on 6 May 2009 to celebrate Fazil Iskander's 80th birthday.

Fazil Abdulovich Iskander (Note: Russian: Фази́ль Абду́лович Исканде́р; Abkhaz: Фазиль Абдул-иԥа Искандер, romanized: Fazil Abdul-ipa Isk’ander) (6 March 1929 – 31 July 2016) was a Soviet and Russian writer and poet known in the former Soviet Union for his descriptions of Caucasian life. He authored various stories, including "Zashchita Chika", which features a crafty and likeable young boy named "Chik", but is probably best known for the picaresque novel Sandro of Chegem and its sequel The Gospel According to Chegem.

== Biography ==
=== Early life ===
Fazil Abdulovich Iskander was born in 1929 in the cosmopolitan port city of Sukhumi, Georgia (then part of the USSR) to an Iranian father (Abdul Ibragimovich Iskander) and an Abkhazian mother (Leili Khasanovna Iskander). His father was deported to Iran in 1938 and sent to a penal camp where he died in 1957. His father was the victim of Joseph Stalin's deportation policies of the national minorities of the Caucasus. As a result, Fazil and his brother Feredun and his sister Giuli were raised by his mother's Abkhazian family. Fazil was only nine years old at that time.

=== Career ===
The most famous intellectual of Abkhazia, he first became well known in the mid-1960s along with other representatives of the "young prose" movement like Yury Kazakov and Vasily Aksyonov, especially for what is perhaps his best story, Sozvezdie kozlotura (1966), variously translated as "The Goatibex Constellation," "The Constellation of the Goat-Buffalo," and "Constellation of Capritaurus." It is written from the point of view of a young newspaperman who returns to his native Abkhazia, joins the staff of a local newspaper, and is caught up in the publicity campaign for a newly produced farm animal, a cross between a goat and a West Caucasian tur (Capra caucasica); a "remarkable satire of Lysenko's genetics and Khrushchev's agricultural campaigns, it was harshly criticized for showing the Soviet Union in a bad light."

He is probably best known in the English speaking world for Sandro of Chegem, a picaresque novel that recounts life in a fictional Abkhaz village from the early years of the 20th century until the 1970s, which evoked praise for the author as "an Abkhazian Mark Twain." Mr. Iskander's humor, like Mark Twain's, has a tendency to sneak up on you instead of hitting you over the head. This rambling, amusing and ironic work has been considered as an example of magic realism, although Iskander himself said he "did not care for Latin American magic realism in general". Five films were made based upon parts of the novel.

Iskander distanced himself from the Abkhaz secessionist strivings in the late 1980s and criticised both Georgian and Abkhaz communities of Abkhazia for their ethnic prejudices. He warned that Abkhazia could become a new Nagorno-Karabakh. Later Iskander resided in Moscow and was a writer for the newspaper Kultura.

On 3 September 2011, a statue of Iskander's literary character Chik was unveiled on Sukhumi's Muhajir Quay.

== Family ==
Iskander had been married to a Russian poet Antonina Mikhailovna Khlebnikova since 1960. In 2011 the couple published a book of poems entitled Snow and Grapes to celebrate their golden wedding anniversary. They had one son and one daughter.

== Death ==
Iskander died in his home on 31 July 2016 in Peredelkino, aged 87.

== Awards and prizes ==
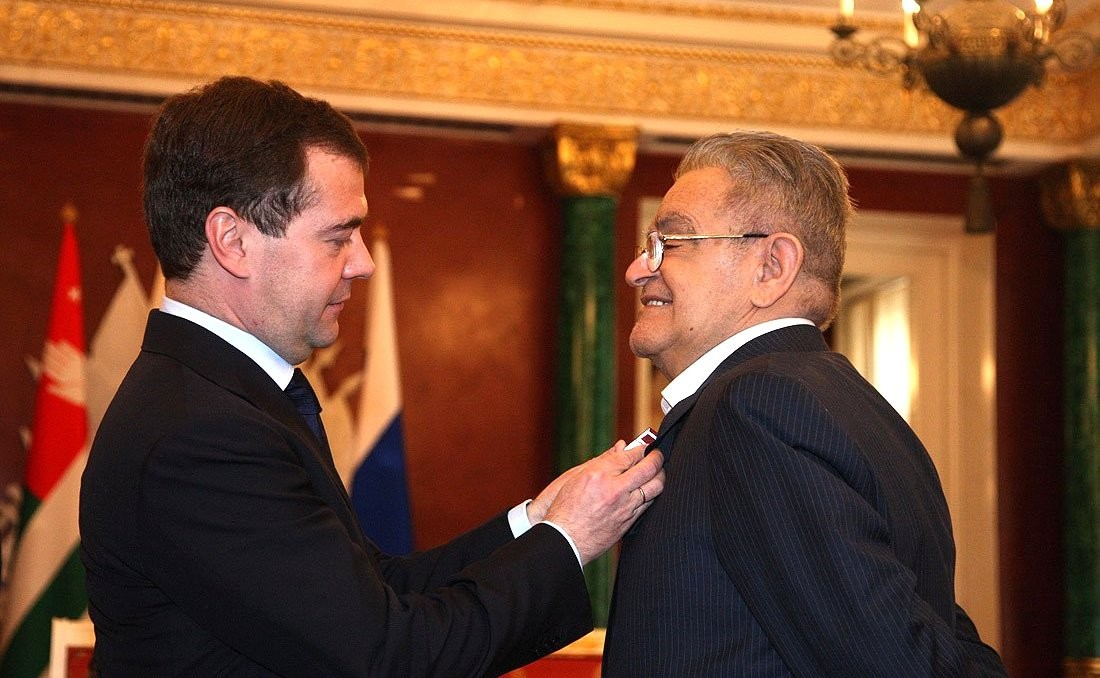
Presentation of the Order "For Merit of the Fatherland", 4nd class with Dmitry Medvedev, 17 February 2010

- USSR State Prize (1989) - for his novel "Sandro of Chegem"
- Alfred Toepfer foundation's Pushkin Prize (1992)
- State Prize of the Russian Federation in Literature and Arts (1993, 2013)
- Triumph Prize (1999).
- Order of Honour and Glory, 1st class (Abkhazia, 18 June 2002)
- Order of Merit for the Fatherland;)
  - 2nd class (29 September 2004)
  - 3rd class (3 March 1999)
  - 4th class (13 March 2009, presented on February 17, 2010.)
- Honorary Member of Russian Academy of Arts
- Yasnaya Polyana Literary Award (2011) - for the novel "Sandro of Chegem"
- Ivan Bunin literary award (2013)

In 2009, Bank of Abkhazia issued a commemorative silver coin from the series "Outstanding Personalities of Abkhazia", dedicated to Fazil Iskander denomination of 10 apsaras.

Already after the writer's death, the Fazil Iskander International Literary Prize was established in Russia in three nominations: prose, poetry and screenplay based on the works of Iskander. The Fazil Iskander International Literary Award is now in its sixth year. was established on August 3, 2016 by the Russian branch of the International Russian PEN Center.

== Works ==
=== Works in English translation ===
- Forbidden Fruit and Other Stories, Central Books LTD, 1972.
- The Goatibex Constellation, Ardis, 1975.
- Lindsey, Byron; Iskander, Fazil; Burlingame, Helen (1976). "The Goatibex Constellation". Books Abroad. 50 (4): 905. doi:10.2307/40131179. JSTOR 40131179.
- Contemporary Russian Prose (English and Russian Edition), 1980 ISBN 978-0-882-33596-4
- Sandro of Chegem, Vintage Books, 1983. ISBN 978-0-394-71516-2
- The Gospel According to Chegem, Vintage Books, 1984.ISBN 978-0-394-72377-8
- Chik and His Friends, Ardis 1985.
- Bolshoi den bolshogo doma: Rasskazy, 1986
- Iskander, Fazil (May 1988). "Fooling with words". Index on Censorship. 17 (5): 19–20. doi:10.1080/03064228808534413. S2CID 146216870.
- Rabbits and Boa Constrictors, Ardis, 1989. (Co-authored with Ronald E. Peterson) ISBN 978-0-882-33557-5
- The Old House Under the Cypress Tree, Faber and Faber, 1996.
- The Thirteenth Labour of Hercules, Raduga, 1997.
- Rasskazy, povestʹ, skazka, dialog, ėsse, stikhi (Zerkalo) (Russian Edition), 1999 ISBN 978-5-891-78090-3
- Parom (Russian Edition), 2004 ISBN 978-5-941-17138-5
- Kozy i Shekspir: [Goats and Shakespear: ], Russian Edition, 2008
- Put' iz Variag v Greki (The Road from the Varangians to the Greeks), Russian Edition 2008 ISBN 978-5-969-10305-4
- Zoloto Vil'gel'ma: Povesti, Rasskazy (Gold of Vilgel'm: Stories, tales), 2010.
- L'energia della vergogna (Italian Edition), 2014.
- The Mystery of Conscience, 2016. ISBN 978-1-329-31637-9
- Departures, 2016 ISSN 1066-999X
- Sandró de Cheguem (Narrativa) (Spanish Edition), 2017 ISBN 978-8-415-50938-7
- Druzia-priiateli/Detstvo Chika, Russian Edition 2018 ISBN 978-5-928-72977-6
- Zvezdnyy kamen (Russian Edition), 2019 ISBN 978-5-969-11841-6
- The Commonwealth Reconstructed ISBN 978-5-871-07810-5
- Iskander, Fazil (1990). Les lapins et les boas (Littérature étrangère rivages). Rivages. ISBN 978-2-869-30408-6.
- Iskander, Fazil (1988). Kroliki i udavy. Книжная палата. p. 288. ISBN 978-5-700-00016-1.

=== Online ===
- Works by Fazil Iskander on Archive.org

=== Further reading ===
- Russian writer of Iranian origin hailed in Moscow.
- Kriza, Elisa (2021). "Blood Carnival and Its Variations in Mexican and Soviet Subversive Satires by René Avilés and Fazil Iskander". Comparative Literature Studies. 58 (2): 397–430. doi:10.5325/complitstudies.58.2.0397. S2CID 238010747. Project MUSE 794578.
- Milne, Lesley (1996). "Fazil' Iskander: From 'Petukh' to 'Pshada'". The Slavonic and East European Review. 74 (3): 445–463. JSTOR 4212146.
