= Ivan Timofeevich Kokorev =

Russian writer

- Born: September 6, 1825; Zaraysk, Russia
- Died: June 14, 1853 (aged 27); Moscow, Russia

Ivan Timofeevich Kokorev (Russian Иван Тимофеевич Кокорев) (September 6, 1825 - June 14, 1853) was a Russian writer.

The son of a freed serf, Kokorev's stories and essays began appearing in the 1840s, but he did not become well known until he began his association with the journal Moskvityanin in 1849. His stories "Sibirka" (1847) and "Savvushka" (1852) were successful, but he is best remembered for his essays collected under the title Moskva sorokovykh godov ('Moscow of the [eighteen] forties'); the collection Ocherki i rasskazy ('Essays and stories') came out posthumously in 1857. He was considered one of the "Moscow patriots" and inveighed against the introduction of foreign words and customs. Apollon Grigoryev wrote in his memoirs of "the clearly-talented and likable sketches of the late I. T. Kokorev."
