= Sandro of Chegem =

Sandro iz Chegema (Russian: Сандро из Чегема), known in English as Sandro of Chegem or The Gospel According to Sandro, is a picaresque novel (or a parody thereof) by Abkhaz author Fazil Iskander, written in Russian and first published in the west in 1979–1981. The book, according to Amy Tikkanen, is "an unfinished collection of anecdotes loosely based on the often comic life of the Abkhazian character Uncle Sandro. It chronicles the collision of Soviet values with Abkhazian patriarchal village life."

== Publication and translation ==
According to Susan Jacoby, the novel was published in Russian in the early 1970s, but 90% of the text had fallen victim to Soviet censorship. Two English translations (by Susan Brownsberger) were published in the United States by Vintage, the first under the title Sandro of Chegem in 1983 and the second under the title The Gospel According to Sandro in 1984. Brownsberger's translation was based on a publication of the novel by Ardis, published in 1979.

Iskander published the individual stories across the years in wherever it was possible to publish them at the time, either in Russia or in the West. A fully uncensored edition did not appear in the Soviet Union until 1989. That edition, split into three volumes, was followed by a 2-volume one in 1995.

== Content and structure ==
The chapters of the novel can stand separately, but form a "unified whole", according to Susan Jacoby. Iskander, in the foreword to the novel, said he started it as a "comic piece, a gentle parody of the picaresque novel". He also noted that "the book you are reading is in fact only part of the epic Sandro. Further episodes of the novel will be published in the future." A second volume on Sandro was published as Novye glavy in 1979/1981 by Ardis, and translated also by Susan Brownsberger and published in 1984 by Vintage.

Starting at 8 chapters in the censored Soviet Union edition in the 1970s, the number of stories was 32 by the 1997 edition, and 33 by the time that a collection of Iskander's works was published in 1997. Peter Vail and Aleksander Genis wrote in 1987 that "Naturally, a finished Sandro does not exist—it continues.".

Deming Brown, of the University of Michigan, refers to Laura Beraha as "Iskander's most perceptive Western critic" and observes her view that Sandro iz Chegema is a "compilation" constructed by "stacking" or "piling up". There is no chronological order to the stories, and they move haphazardly around in time (spanning the second half of the 20th century) and location (from Abkhazia's coastline to its mountains) as Iskander has built the work up.

=== Joseph Stalin ===
In the chapter "Belshazzar's Feast", censored in the Soviet Union until 1988, Sandro meets Joseph Stalin at a banquet. Stalin is a recurring character in the stories.

In "Belshazzar's Feast" Stalin is gradually revealed as a diabolically evil character, through several means. Characters never say his name, always referring to him as "he" or "That One", and oaths made to the devil are scattered throughout the story. The use of Stalin's nicknames amongst the prisoners in the Gulag forced labour camps, "cannibal" and "hangman", also link the story indirectly to Stalin.

Stalin's various physical attributes, from a withered left arm, through a sloping shoulder, the "oily gleam" in his eyes, and his malevolent gaze are, according to Karen L. Ryan of the University of Virginia, an evocation of the Antichrist, alongside the way that the characters anticipate his arrival at the feast. Ryan also notes that the very title of the work evokes a Biblical context, in particular the Book of Daniel. Ryan analyses the character of Stalin as a superhumanly evil figure elevated "to a cosmic plane", a reflection of Iskander's own outspoken views on the real historic Stalin, and on Stalinism.

A dance troupe performs at the feast, and after their performance Stalin rips a roast chicken apart and gives pieces of it to the members of the troupe as a reward. Sandro himself grovels on his knees before Stalin, blindfolded and sliding towards him across the dance floor, as a demonstration of his devotion to the "Leader".

The banquet as a whole is a distorted version of traditional Abkhazian hospitality rites, with excesses of gluttony and drunkenness, and politics.

=== Uncle Sandro ===
The titular character Sandro is a dancer and toastmaster who is, in Dennis Brown's words, "an unreliable neer-do-well, petty operator, and trickster" who is "a charming, vital embodiment of human frailty".

He appears in the stories alongside a large number of his relatives, and characters that appear and disappear at random from one story to the next.

== Legacy and importance ==
The novel is frequently compared to the work of Mark Twain. According to the Moscow Times, "The strong regional flavor of the novel and its picaresque nature highlight Iskander's unique capacity for human observation".

The character of Uncle Sandro appears in other of Iskander's works that are not officially part of the Sandro story-cycle proper, such as Man and His Surroundings, where now Vladimir Lenin is the recurring character — or rather a deranged scholar of Marxism who believes that he is Lenin, cryogenically preserved by Germans after World War 2 and resurrected in post-Glasnost Abkhazia.
