= Ilya Salov =

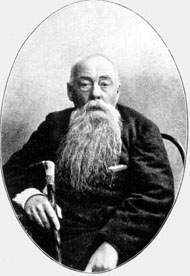
- Born: April 6, 1834; Penza, Russian Empire
- Died: December 24, 1902 (aged 68); Saratov, Russian Empire.
- Occupation: Novelist • playwright •
- Writing career
- Period: 1850s-late1890s
- Genre: realism

Ilya Alexandrovich Salov (Илья Александрович Салов, 6 April 1834, Penza, Russian Empire, — 24 December 1902, Saratov, Russian Empire, was a Russian writer, playwright and translator.

Having started in mid-1850s (in Russky Vestnik, Sovremennik and Otechestvennye Zapiski) with a series of short stories and novelets mostly in the vein of the then hugely popular Ivan Turgenev's prose, Salov came to prominence in the late 1870s with a series of Otechestvennye Zapiski-published novellas (Merchant Chesalkin's Mill, Asp). In 1892 the Works by I.A.Salov in three volumes came out, followed by two short story collections, S natury (From Nature, С натуры, 1893), and Suyeta mirskaya (Worldly Vanity, Суета мирская, 1894). Among his acclaimed later works were the novels Uyutny ugolok (Cosy Corner, Уютный уголок, 1894) and Praktika zhizni (Life's Experience, Практика жизни, 1895), among them.
