= Seryozha (novel) =

1955 novel by Vera Panova

- Frontispiece illustration to a Russian edition of Seryozha published in Leningrad in 1965
- Author: Vera Panova
- Language: Russian
- Publication date: 1955
- Publication place: Soviet Union

Seryozha (Russian: Серёжа, published 1955) is a short novel by Soviet writer Vera Panova. Seryozha has also been translated as Time Walked and A Summer to Remember. Seryozha is a diminutive form of the name Sergey.

== Plot ==
Seryozha is the story of a young boy living in the rural Soviet Union in the mid-1950s. The novel describes Seryozha's experiences, and those of his family, friends and neighbors over the course of a summer. The most important event of the story is the marriage of Seryozha's mother to a Red Army veteran named Dmitry Korostelyev. Korostelyev becomes the new manager of the local collective farm and a strong role model for Seryozha. Throughout the novel Panova gives a relatively grim picture of life in the rural Soviet Union where both money and opportunity are scarce. The novel ends with Korostelyev being reassigned to a new collective farm in the remote Arkhangelsky District, and taking the family with him.

== Quote ==
Panova said of the genesis of Seryozha:

"The soul of a child was revealed to me, the revelation engendered reflection, my reflections became clothed in images- and there appeared Seryozha."

== English translations ==
- Time Walked, Harvill Press, 1957.
- A Summer to Remember, Thomas Yoseloff, 1962.
- Selected Works, Progress Publishers, Moscow, 1976.

== Screen version ==
The story was brought to the screen in the 1960 film Seryozha by Georgi Daneliya and Igor Talankin.
