= The Town of N =

1935 novel by Leonid Dobychin

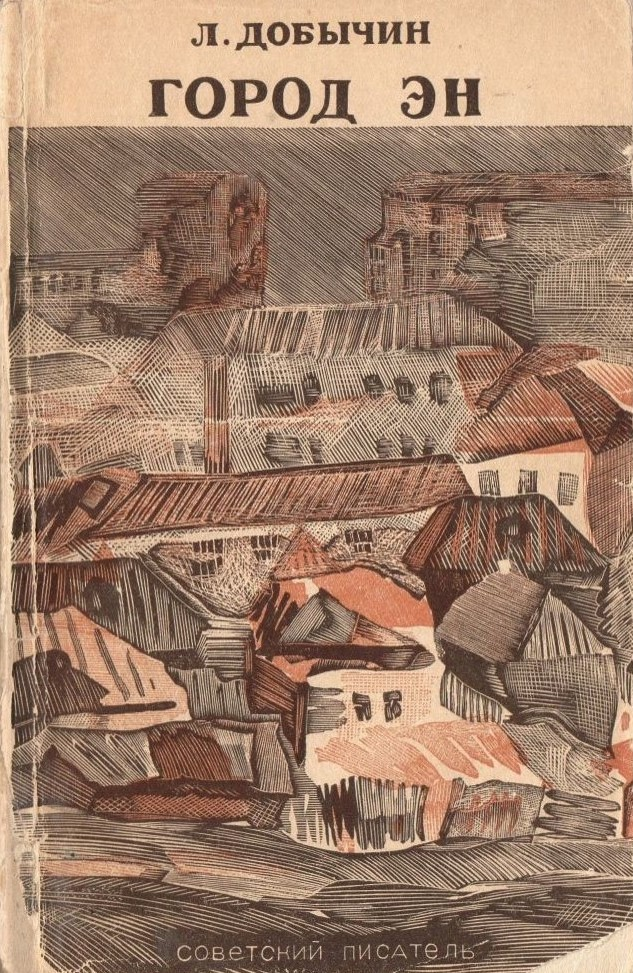
- First edition
- Author: Leonid Dobychin
- Language: Russian
- Genre: Bildungsroman, modernist, historical novel
- Publication date: 1935
- Publication place: Soviet Union

The Town of N (Russian: Город Эн) is a 1935 novel by Leonid Dobychin. Publication of the novel caused criticism (the novel was attacked for "formalism"), leading to the author's disappearance and the presumable death by suicide. Although the town N takes its name from a town in Gogol's Dead Souls it is probably based on Dvinsk. It is being compared to the novels by James Joyce and Marcel Proust. It was first published in English in 1998.

The novel follows the stream of consciousness of a boy from age seven in 1901 until he is 15. The boy relates events of his family, school years, father's death, readings, first romance and the eruption of the Russo-Japanese War. The author's irony and the main character's description of the provincial society in which he lives also make the novel close to Dead Souls.

Dobychin was just beginning to explore the spectrum of his gifts when the publication of The Town of N in 1935 triggered his demise. The Town of N is both a lyrical exploration of childhood myth- ...
