= Tatiana Vedenska =

Russian writer and novelist

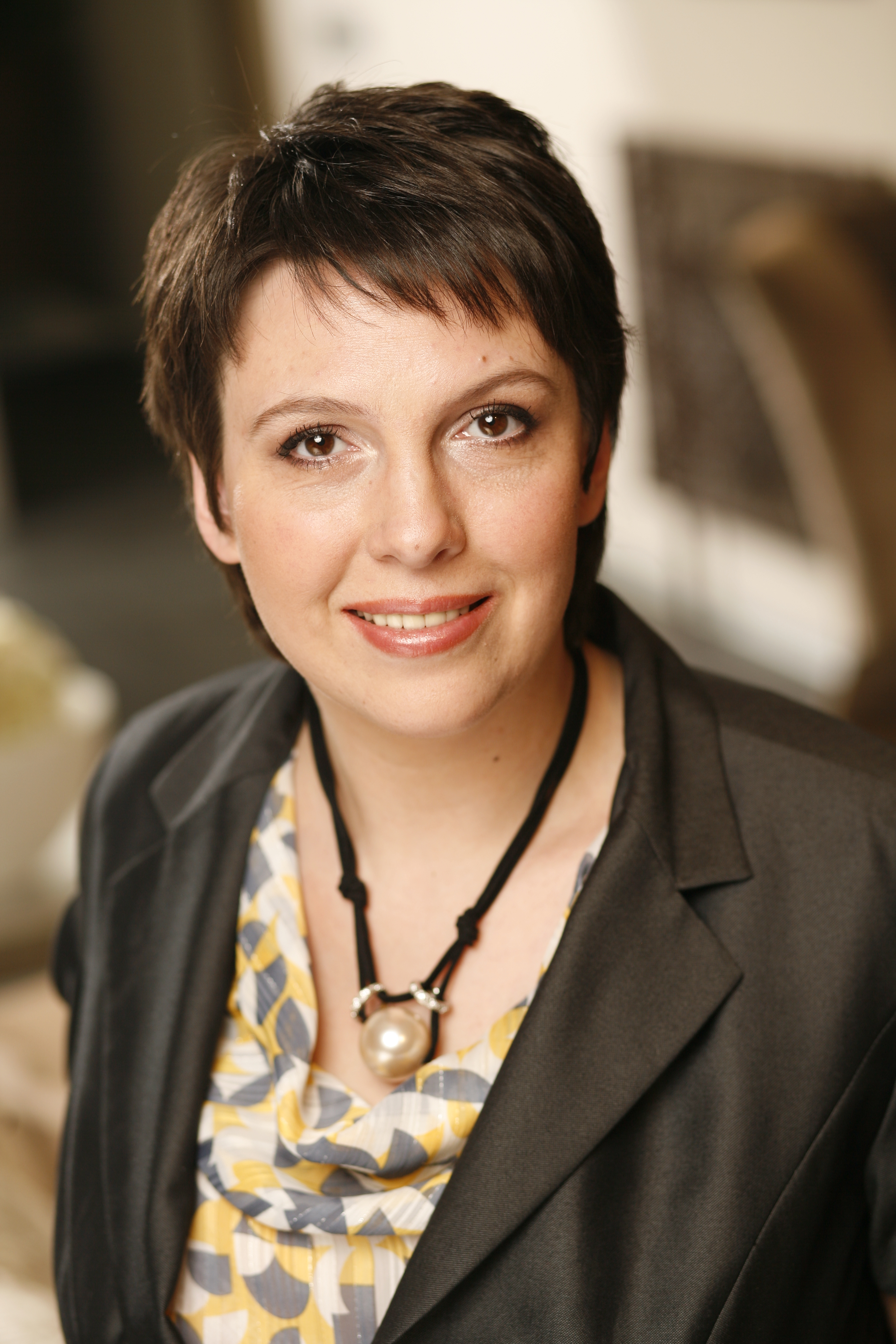
Tatiana Vedenska 2010.

Tatiana Vedenska (Russian: Татьяна Евгеньевна Веденская; born 15 July 1976) is a widely known Russian writer and novelist.

== Biography ==
Tatiana was born in Moscow into the family of an engineer. Her great grandfather on her mother's side was Sergey Vasilievich Baskakov, the Russian composer, a nobleman. Her great grandmother was a Polish gypsy. When Tatiana was 16 years old, her parents divorced. Tatiana left home and became a street musician. She travelled from city to city with her boyfriend, who was also a musician. They stayed at the houses of friends and played guitar. At 18 Tatiana got married, and soon gave birth to her eldest daughter Margarita. Because of her husband's lifestyle, the marriage was unsuccessful and ended in divorce. Tatiana tried many different jobs. She sang on the streets, worked as an insurance agent, and was a bar tender in one of Moscow's theaters. She also worked as a university secretary and laboratory assistant. Eventually she became a real estate agent and continued working in this area for ten years, until she decided to write her first book. Tatiana is currently in her second marriage. She has three children, Margarita, Anastasia and Anthony.

== Creative work ==
Tatiana's first novel, called "The peculiarities of the women’s charm" (Особенности женского шарма) was published by a small Moscow publishing company in 2005, after they received it through the Internet. One year later she began working with the famous Russian literary agent Nathan Zablotski, and the biggest Russian publishing company Eksmo. Tatiana is the author of more than twenty five novels. Her total books sales have reached 5,000,000 copies. In 2008 the novel "Don't rush the love" was taken as a story base for the TV movie with the same name (original "Не торопи любовь"). Also three contracts were signed with NTV-Profit Company. They represent the movies: "The peculiarities of the women’s charm", "The ambitious girl" (Девушка с амбициями) and "The little women" (Маленькая женщина). In 2014 the novel "Love doesn't mean happiness" (original "Не в парнях счастье") was taken as a story base for the TV movie with the same name. In 2008, Tatiana visited the United States. She was meeting her readers in the Russian bookstore on Briton Beach street, New York. In 2008, she was interviewed by the Davidson radio. The same meetings took place in 2010. Tatiana has been a contestant of The Literary Exhibitions and The International Festivals. In 2013 Tatiana Vedenska was invited to lead a broadcast show called "Bestseller school". As a host of this show, during next half of a year, Tatiana Vedenska guided listeners how to successfully write a book, exchanged ideas with the audience, and answered their questions. After the show's end, a book named "A knight of nowadays" was published. Some ideas for this book have been created by Tatiana during this "Bestseller school" show.

== Bibliography ==
Movies based on the books:

• "Don’t rush love" (Не торопи любовь) 2008

• "Love doesn’t mean happiness" (Не в парнях счастье) 2014

Series "Under the shining sun"

• "Make a wish" (Загадай желание") 2014

• "A knight of nowadays" (Рыцарь нашего времени) 2014

• "Ash blonde" (Пепельный блондин) 2013

• "The kept woman" (Содержанки) 2013

• "Genius. A love story" (Гений или история любви) 2012

• "Virtual connections" (Виртуальные связи) 2012

• "Bad girls" (Плохие девочки) 2011

Documentary

• "A question about real estate" (Квартирный вопрос или байки черного маклера) 2011

In foreign languages

• Брачен Маратон (Bulgaria, Sofia) 2008

Series "For particular women"

• "This is man’s world" (Это мужской мир, подруга) 2011

• "The green porch" (Зеленый подъезд) 2011

• "Love doesn’t mean happiness" (Не в парнях счастье) 2011

• "Man are like kids" (Мужчины как дети) 2010

• "Too much for one’s husband" (Муж объелся груш) 2010

• "Wish you the best, my darling" (Счастья тебе, дорогуша) 2010

• "Surprise for my lover" (Сюрприз для любимого) 2010

• "Think that’s love?" (Думаешь, это любовь?) 2010

• "Dreaming about someone like you" (Мечтать о такой как ты...) 2009

• "My charming boss" (Мой шикарный босс) 2009

• " I’ll find you anyway" (Я все равно тебя найду) 2009

• "The peculiarities of the women’s charm" (Основы женского шарма) 2009

• «One woman’s divorce" (История одного развода) 2009

• "A respectable affair" (Измена в рамках приличий) 2009

• "Tiny woman" (Маленькая женщина) 2009

• "My husband’s wedding" (Свадьба моего мужа) 2009

• "My favorite march" (Любимый мотив Мендельсона) 2009

• "Don’t rush love" (Не торопи любовь) 2008

• "The ambitious girl" (Девушка с амбициями) 2008

• "The peculiarities of the women’s charm" (Under the title "Three recipes about happiness") 2005, Stolitsa-Print
