= Ivan Kushchevsky =

Russian writer

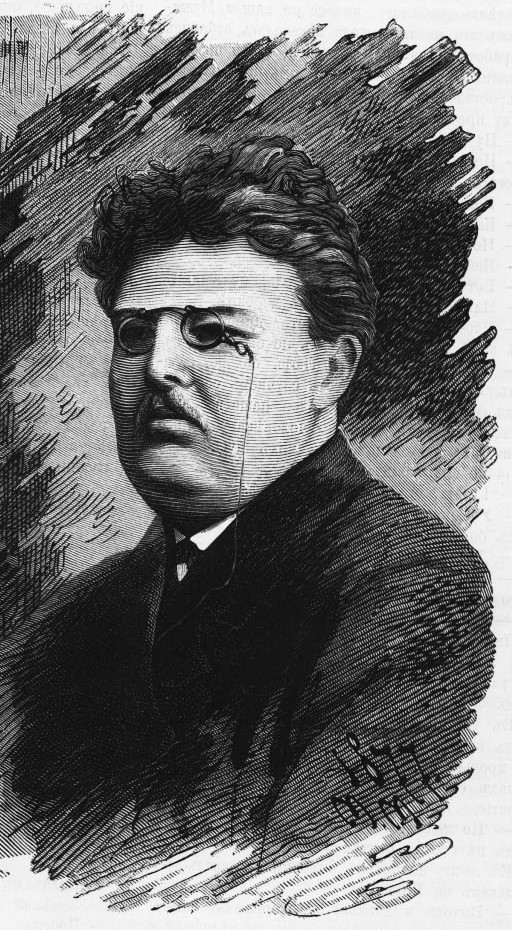
- Engraving by G. Grachev (1877)
- Born: 1847; Barnaul, Russian Empire
- Died: August 12, 1876 (aged 28–29); St. Petersburg, Russian Empire
- Occupations: Novelist, journalist, short story writer, literary critic
- Writing career
- Period: 1866—1876
- Notable works: Nikolai Negorev; or, The Successful Russian

Ivan Afanasyevich Kushchevsky (Russian: Ива́н Афана́сьевич Куще́вский); 1847 – 24 August [O.S. 12 August] 1876) was a Russian writer.

== Biography ==
Kushchevsky was born in Barnaul, Siberia, Russian Empire where his father was a minor official. He received his early education at the Tomsk gymnasium. He went to Saint Petersburg in the mid-1860s to study at the University, but had to leave school due to lack of money. He worked at odd jobs and lived in cheap boarding houses in the slums for several years. In 1870 he began writing sketches describing his experiences among the lower classes.

In 1871 his only novel Nikolai Negorev; or, The Successful Russian, was serialized in Otechestvennye Zapiski. In the novel, Nikolai tells the story of his progress from age twelve to the beginning of what promises to be a solid career in the civil service. In the writing of Nikolai Negorev, Kushchevsky was strongly influenced by Nikolai Chernyshevsky's novel What is to be Done?. Nikolai Negorev was highly praised by the critics of the day.

Kushchevsky wrote Nikolai Negorev between July and November 1870, at the age of 23, while he was sick and destitute in a hospital for the poor. He described the process of composing his novel:

"I was absorbed by my novel Negorev, and gave up all other work for it. I soon found myself with nothing to eat. Luckily for me, I have been admitted to hospital. Here I sell my rations in order to buy candles and I work away on an empty stomach. But progress is slow. The evenings are dark and I haven't money for all the candles I need."

Throughout his adult life he suffered from privation and alcoholism, which eventually contributed to his death at an early age.

== Legacy ==
Nicholas Negorev is not, from the formal point of view, as original as the writings of Pomyalovsky or Uspensky. It as sumes the more or less orthodox form of a chronicled life, the greater part of which is occupied by the childhood and boyhood of the hero. This hero, in whose person the narrative is con ducted, is a remarkable type of moderately ambitious, mod erately clever, moderately cowardly, moderately priggish boy who grows up to be a successful, satisfied, and selfish bureau crat . But it is not the central figure, however finely drawn, that makes the unique charm of the book. The other charac ters, Nicholas's reckless, foolish, and generous brother Andrew, their sister Liza, the extraordinary crank and fanatic, Overin, the hero's fiancée, Sophie Vasilievna, are all figures endowed with a convincing liveness that challenges comparison with War and Peace. Kushchevsky's delicacy of touch is unique in Russian literature. For liveliness and lightness of humour the book has no equals. While on a higher level of seriousness, the character of the fanatic Overin, with his succession of dead - serious and dangerously earnest fads while a schoolboy and his propagandist activities when grown up, and the scene of the death of Sophie Vasilievna belong to the greatest achieve ment of Russian fiction. From the historical point of view the novel offers an unsurpassed picture of the change that transformed the Russia of Nicholas I into the almost anarchic Russia of the sixties.

— D. S. Mirsky. A History of Russian Literature: From Its Beginnings to 1900

== English translations ==
- Nikolai Negorev; or, The Successful Russian, (novel), Calder and Boyars, 1967.
