= Maria Rybakova =

Russian writer

Maria Aleksandrovna Rybakova (Russian: Мари́я Александровна Рыбако́ва) (b. 1973 in Moscow) is a Russian writer whose works have been published in multiple languages.

== Life ==
Rybakova is the only daughter of literary critic Natalia Ivanova, deputy editor of the magazine Znamya, and a granddaughter of the writer Anatoly Rybakov.

She studied Classics starting at the age of 17, when she entered Moscow University, and moved to Germany when she was 20 to continue her studies at the Humboldt University, ultimately receiving a PhD degree in classics from Yale University in 2004. Her first novel, Anna Grom and Her Ghost, was published in 1999 (in Russian). She was awarded the Sergei Dovlatov Award in 2004 for the best Russian language short story. Over the years she worked and travelled in a number of places, including Geneva, Munich, the Mekong River region in Thailand, and Changchun, China, where she held a visiting lecturer position at the Northeast Normal University. She is an occasional contributor to the Los Angeles Review of Books.

Among other fellowships, Rybakova was a writer-in-residence at Bard College (2005) and the Institute for Advanced Study at the Central European University, Budapest (2016–2017). She taught at California State University, Long Beach, during the academic year 2006–2007, and then joined the Classics and Humanities faculty of San Diego State University for a decade. Since then, she has held a visiting fellowship at the New Europe College, Bucharest (2017–2018), and a Fulbright scholarship at the A.I. Cuza University, Romania (2019–2020). Rybakova is currently associate professor at Nazarbayev University, Kazakhstan.

== Major works ==
- Анна Гром и ее призрак, Глагол, 1999 (translated into German as Die Reise der Anna Grom, 2001, and Spanish as El fantasma de Anna Grom, 2004).
- Тайна: Повести и роман, Екатеринбург: У-Фактория, 2001
- "The Child-snatching Demons of Antiquity: Narrative Traditions, Psychology and Nachleben", Ph.D. thesis, Yale University, 2004.
- Братство проигравших, Время, 2005 (translated into French as La Confrèrie des perdants, 2006).
- Слепая речь, Время, 2006.
- Острый нож для мягкого сердца, Время, 2009.
- Гнедич, Время, 2011.
- Черновик человека, Эксмо, 2014.
- Если есть рай, Знамя, 2018.
