= Aleksei Bibik =

Russian writer (1878–1976)

Aleksei Pavlovich Bibik
- Алексей Павлович Бибик
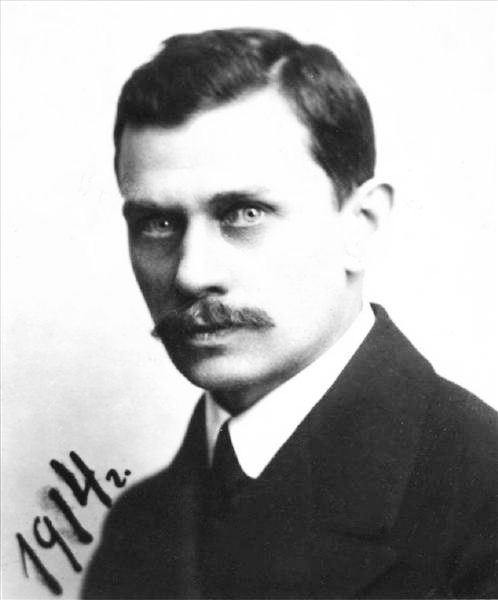
- Born: Aleksei Pavlovich Bibik; October 17, 1878; Kharkiv
- Died: November 18, 1976 (aged 98); Mineralnye Vody

Aleksei Pavlovich Bibik (Russian: Алексей Павлович Бибик; October 17, 1878 – November 18, 1976) was a Russian and Soviet working class writer, dramatist and revolutionary.

== Life ==
Bibik was one of a relative handful of working class writers who wrote primarily fiction, and he was one of the most prolific. Born on 5 (17) October 1878 in Kharkiv, in the Kharkov Governorate of the Russian Empire (in present-day eastern Ukraine), he was the son of a metal turner (tokar', also translatable as lathe operator). Bibik was relatively better educated than many worker writers, which may partly explain his turn to prose, which a number of other samouchki tried and abandoned as too difficult compared to poetry, or came to later in life. Starting at the age of nine, he learned basic literacy at a privately owned school before enrolling in a regular city primary school in Kharkov. After completion (presumably following the fourth grade), he entered the final (fifth) year of a two-class Church parish school. Hoping to continue his education further, he enrolled in a railroad technical school. But when his father fell ill he had to return home and enter instead the Kharkov locomotive railway workshop as an apprentice metal turner (though he had to claim to be a year older than he actually was in order to be allowed to work legally). He later moved to Taganrog, on the Sea of Azov, where he found work in the railroad shops, though his real goal (he later tells us) was to enter into a sailing school in order to fulfill a dream of sailing the seas. The death of his father in 1898 forced him to return home once again to his family in Kharkov and to work as a turner on the railroad.

In the late 1890s, Bibik joined an underground workers’ circle and soon after joined the local social democratic organization in Kharkov. In 1900 he was arrested for his political activities and for organizing a strike in his workshop, and exiled for three years to Viatka province, near the Ural mountains. At the end of his exile in 1903, he was again arrested, this time for propaganda among the local peasantry and for organizing a socialist circle, for which he was exiled for five years to the Siberian north (Arkhangelsk province), though he was freed in the 1905 amnesty. Returning to work in the Kharkov railway workshops, he joined the local Menshevik organization and, in 1906, was a member of the Menshevik delegation to the Fourth (Unity) Congress of the RSDLP in Stockholm. He would for many years remain an activist in the Menshevik movement, frequently changing jobs (from 1905 to 1917 he worked variously as a turner, draftsman, machinist, carpenter, statistician, and even land surveyor) and moving to different cities (Baku, Sevastopol, Mariupol, Voronezh, Riga, and in the Don region), partly in order to avoid arrest. Still, at least twice more he spent time in tsarist prisons.

Bibik began writing during his first exile in Vyatka Governorate--"out of boredom" he later claimed. His stories appeared in print starting in 1901: in provincial newspapers, in left-wing magazines, in the Menshevik press, and in a collection of his stories published in 1905. While working as a draftsman in a factory in Voronezh in 1910, he completed a novel, which he began writing in 1906, about workers' lives and struggles. Called K shirokoi doroge (To the Open Road), it was first published in 1912, with the help of the Marxist literary critic V. L. L'vov-Rogachevskii, in the socialist magazine Sovremennyi mir (Modern world) and reprinted as a book in 1914.

When the Bolsheviks took power in 1917, Bibik initially stood with the socialist opposition. By 1920, however, he had abandoned Menshevism and politics altogether. He revised his first novel (several times, in fact) more in line with Communist notions about the labor movement and completed a second novel that was published in 1922, but was viewed by Communist critics as still showing signs of "ideological confusion." For the next few years, Bibik abandoned literature as well and returned to work in industry and as an agronomist. He resumed writing only in 1925, publishing a number of stories and plays. After 1932, he was able to quit work and work exclusively as a writer, though from 1936 (the start of the years of Stalin's terror) until 1957 (a few years after Stalin's death), no works by Bibik were published and we know little of his activities.

== Sources ==
- RGALI (Russian State Archive of Literature and Art, Moscow), f. 1849, op. 1, d. 1, l. 8 (Autobiography of A.P. Bibik, evidently written after 1917).
- V. L. L’vov-Rogachevskii, Introduction to A. Bibik, K shirokoi doroge (Ignat iz Novoselovki) (St. Petersburg, 1914)
- RGALI, f. 1849, op. 1, d. 1, l. 6-8 (Autobiography of A.P. Bibik)
- L'vov-Rogachevskii, Ocherki proletarskoi literatury, 216-220
- Literaturnaia Entsiklopediia 1:476-78
- Russkie Sovetskie pisateli: Prozaiki, 1:224-34
- Kratkaia literaturnaia entsiklopediia 1:592
- Modern Encyclopedia of Russian and Soviet Literature, 2:238-39
- Russkie pisateli, 1800-1917, 1:263-64
