= Vladimir Rybakov =

Russian writer (1947–2018)

Vladimir Mechislavovich Rybakov / Wladimir Secinski (Russian: Влади́мир Мечисла́вович Рыбако́в / Влади́мир Сечински; 29 September 1947 – 20 August 2018) was a Russian writer.

Vladimir was born in Paris in 1947. He lived in the Soviet Union 1956–1972, including a hitch in the Soviet Army, and returned to the West in 1972, since which time he has been a journalist and a novelist with a historical bent. He spent much of the 1980s in Afghanistan, where, among other things, he interviewed Soviet soldiers captured by the Afghans. He spent 1989–1995 in Moscow and spent the last years of his life in Bulgaria, where he completed a huge historical novel about Genghis Khan. At the time of his death he was preparing a book on how Eastern and Western civilizations developed. Two of his books, The Afghans, a novella about Soviet soldiers in Afghanistan, and Creature, a geopolitical thriller, have been published recently in English (2004 and 2005, respectively), and The Mystery of Genghis Khan is being prepared for publication.

== English translations ==
- The Brand, Hutchinson, 1986.
- The Burden, Hutchinson, 1986.
- The Afghans: A Novella of Soviet Soldiers in Afghanistan, Infinity Publishing, 2004.
- Creature: A French Russian Thriller, Infinity Publishing, 2005.
