= Sofia Khvoshchinskaya =

Russian painter

Sofia Dmitriyevna Khvoshchinskaya (Russian: Софья Дмитриевна Хвощинская), June 1 [O.S. May 20] 1824 – August 17 [O.S. August 5] 1865, was a nineteenth-century Russian writer of literary fiction and social commentary, as well as a painter and translator.

== Biography ==
Khvoshchinskaya was born into a noble family in the village of Voronki in Ryazan Province's Pronsk Uyezd. Her father, Dmitry Kesarevich Khvoshchinsky (1796–1856), was an artillery officer in the Russian Army who served in the war of 1812 against Napoleon. Upon retirement from the military he married Yuliya Vikentyevna Drobyshevskaya-Rubets (c. 1801 – 1884) and purchased an estate with a distillery. He was later falsely accused of having committed embezzlement in a previous position, a charge that cost him 15,000 rubles and bankrupted the family, forcing them to give up their estate and move to Ryazan. After the case against him was resolved and his reputation restored, Dmitry Kesarevich was able to join the civil service as a land surveyor for the treasury.

Sofia had four siblings. The eldest, Nadezhda (1821–1889), was well known to readers of Russia's nineteenth-century "thick" journals under her pseudonym, V. Krestovsky. A younger sister, Praskovya (1828–1916) published a few short stories under the penname S. Zimarov. Another sister died in childhood. Their brother followed in his father's footsteps and became a military officer. After he married, his wife and children came to live with the family in Ryazan while he served in the Caucasus.

In addition to being educated (along with her siblings) by her mother, Sofia spent several years at the Catherine Institute in Moscow (1836–1843). The fact that she graduated first in her class gave her a ribbon with a gold monogram (chiffre) of Catherine's initial (which her father, much to Sofia's embarrassment, forced her to wear in public). It also entitled her to teach in an official institution or run a private school, an opportunity she declined. Part I of the memoir of her time at the Catherine Institute, "Reminiscences of Institute Life," has been published in English translation. At home, the children started writing poetry and prose in childhood, producing, under Nadezhda's editorship, a household literary journal titled Zvezdochka (The Little Star). As a friend described it, in their home "there was no card playing, no backbiting; what they were interested in was literature, the arts, and social issues." The entire family was extremely close-knit, and Nadezhda and Sofia had an exceptionally strong lifelong bond. The parents did not shelter their children from the hardships they endured during their long legal ordeal, in fact Nadezhda served as her father's secretary until his death. Nadezhda's and Sofia's knowledge of the real-life provincial-level economic and legal workings of imperial Russia is reflected in their work.

After their father's death in 1856, Sofia wanted to accept a job as director of a school in another province to help support the family, but Nadezhda dissuaded her, which Praskovya describes as "an awful, irreversible decision" that placed a tremendous burden on Nadezhda and Sofia to support the extended family while depriving the family's other women of opportunities to find gainful employment in one of Russia's capitals. Sofia's first work was published in 1857.

Like many mid-century female authors, Khvoshchinskaya published under a male pseudonym, Ivan Vesenev. Her oeuvre is fairly evenly divided between fiction and essays, but in her case, the line between these two genres is ambiguous. Her fictional narrators often engage in social commentary, while her social commentaries are highly stylized sketches that weave a complex web of irony and anecdote. Only three of her twenty-one published works can clearly be excluded from the realm of belle-lettres: the memoir of her years at the Catherine Institute; her review of an exhibition at the Academy of Arts; and an article on the plight of impoverished and poorly educated girls. First and foremost, she was a chronicler of provincial life in the era of political and agricultural reform.

While the works published using the Vesenev pseudonym address a wide variety of themes, there is one that predominates. In both her fiction and essays Khvoshchinskaya describes how different layers of society—in particular the provincial gentry and the socially and culturally dominant forces of the aristocratic and intellectual elite—grappled with the “new currents of learning,” with the “old and new understandings” referred to in the first paragraph of her novel City Folk and Country Folk. These currents, which were varied and often conflicting, included social Darwinism, French socialism, German philosophy (both the idealist philosophies of Kant and Leibniz and the emerging historical materialism of Marx), English liberalism, and anarchism. They were all being frantically studied, analyzed, expounded upon and disseminated—to the extent censorship would allow—on the pages of Russia's journals.

In addition to her literary endeavors, Sofia was an avid painter and student of art. Beginning in the late 1850s, she began to spend several months most years in St. Petersburg. In 1858, on one such visit to the capital, she made the acquaintance of the painter Alexander Ivanov when his painting, The Appearance of Christ Before the People, was being exhibited at the Academy of Arts. In her 1880 work “Memoirs of a Reader,” Nadezhda describes an encounter between a “young woman from the provinces” and Ivanov that appears to describe Sofia's brief relationship with the painter. As in real life, Ivanov is given the sisters' address and calls on them the very next day:

He was met with joy and affection, like a father. This was not a formal reception, not a ceremonial acclamation, but an encounter with someone cherished, beloved—a rendezvous in which the ever-present thought that greatness was now under their roof was constantly combined with a wholehearted, eternal devotion that looks into the eyes but can find no words. He could see that, understand that, and was touched and did not shy away from it. Seeing each other for the first time in their lives, they were at ease, affectionate, sincerely cheerful, like family; he even said that he had “never had a family”; he told stories, confided his concerns about paintings, his thoughts about future works, and invited her to come with him to Rome and to Asia. . . “Let’s go,” she replied. “I’ll clean your brushes and sweep your studio.” In parting he kissed her hand. Five days later she kissed his—now dead—and seven years later, when she herself was dying, she thought of him.

After Ivanov's death, Sofia painted his portrait, which was sold to a wealthy Russian collector.

In 1859 wealthy relatives invited Khvoshchinskaya to join them on a trip to Western Europe. She spent June through October visiting Germany, Switzerland, Paris, and possibly England, a trip described in her short story published the following year, "How People Admire Nature" (Kak liudi liubuiutsia prirodoi). After the ascendance of Alexander II to the throne in 1855, the nobility was given greater freedom to travel, and Khvoshchinskaya's story examines the behavior of Russian tourists amid the beauty of the Swiss Alps in this gentle parody of current Russian attitudes and preoccupations. In 1861 Vladimir Zotov, an early supporter of both sisters'writing, published a short anonymous piece by Sofia about Alexander Radishchev that extolled the eighteenth-century progressive who had been exiled to Siberia after publishing his 1789 A Journey from St. Petersburg to Moscow, a scathing critique of serfdom. Although, with the liberation of the serfs it was now becoming permissible to talk openly about Radishchev, this publication led to the closing of Illiustratsiia, where the piece was published.

Both Nadezhda and Sofia Khvoshchinskaya translated from multiple Western European languages. Among other works, Sofia translated John Stuart Mill's 1859 On Liberty.

Sofia Khvoshchinskaya published prolifically until her life was cut short by a case of abdominal tuberculosis at the age of 41.

== Works Published as Iv. Vesenev ==
"Znakomye liudi," Otechestvennye zapiski, March 1857

"Nasledstvo tetushki," Otechestvennye zapiski, vol. 117, March 1858

"Prostye smertnye: Ocherki iz provintsial'noi zhizni," Otechestvennye zapiski, vol. 120, pp. 1–38, 1858

"Iz otkrovennogo razgovora," Illiustratsiia, no. 13, 1858

"Braslet: Povest'," Illiustratsiia, no. 49, pp. 378–379; no.50, pp. 400–407, 1859

"Sel'tso lyskovo," Otechestvennye zapiski, vol. 124, no. 5, pp. 1–74, 1859

"Zernovskii," Biblioteka dlia chteniia, no. 9, 1859

"Kak liudi liubuiutsia prirodoi," Otechestvennye zapiski, vol. 156, 1860

"Biografiia odnogo semeistva: Rasskaz," Otechestvennye zapiski, vol. 130, no. 6, pp. 445–478, 1860

Mudrenyi chelovek: Roman, Otechestvennye zapiski, vol. 136, pp. 149-296; 137, pp. 1–299, 1861

"Plach provintsial'a (Ocherk)," Russkii vestnik, vol. 36, no. 11, pp. 366–392, 1861

"Koe-chto o nashykh nravakh," Otechestvennye zapiski, vol. 143, no. 7, 1862

"Zemnye radosti i radosti nashego pereulka," Otechestvennye zapiski, vol. 143, no. 6, pp. 402–438, 1862

Gorodskie i derevenskie, Otechestvennye zapiski, no. 3/4, pp. 1–73 and 364–434, 1863

Domashniaia idilliia nedavnego vremeni: Roman, Otechestvennye zapiski, vol. 149, no. 7-8, pp. 535-566; vol. 150, no. 9, pp. 1-82; vol. 151, no. 10, pp. 333-402; no. 11, pp. 42-121, 1863

"Nasha gorodskaia zhizn'," Biblioteka dlia chteniia, no. 3, 1864

"Provintsial'nyi `bon-genre' i `mauvais genre'," Biblioteka dlia chteniia, vol. 183, no. 4/5, 1864

"Malen'kie bedy: Ocherki nastoiashchego," Biblioteka dlia chteniia, vol. 1, no. 3, 1865

== Works Published Anonymously ==
"Aleksandr Nikolaevich Radishchev," Illustratsiia, 7, no. 159 (March 2, 1861), pp. 129–130

"Vospominaniia institutskoi zhizni," Russkii vestnik, 9-10, 1861; No. 9, pp. 264–298

"Vystavka v akademii khudozhestv," Otechestvennye zapiski, 10, 1862, pp. 319–324

"K voprosu o zhenskom trude," Otechestvennye zapiski, 12, 1863, pp. 122–143

== Works in English Translation ==
"Reminiscences of Institute Life," trans. Valentina Baslyk. In Russia through Women's Eyes: Autobiographies from Tsarist Russia, ed. Toby W. Clyman and Judith Vowles. New Haven: Yale University Press, 1996.

City Folk and Country Folk. By Sofia Khvoshchinskaya. Trans. Nora Seligman Favorov. New York: Columbia University Press, 2017 (The Russian Library).
