= Nadezhda Khvoshchinskaya =

Russian novelist, poet, literary critic and translator (1821–1889)

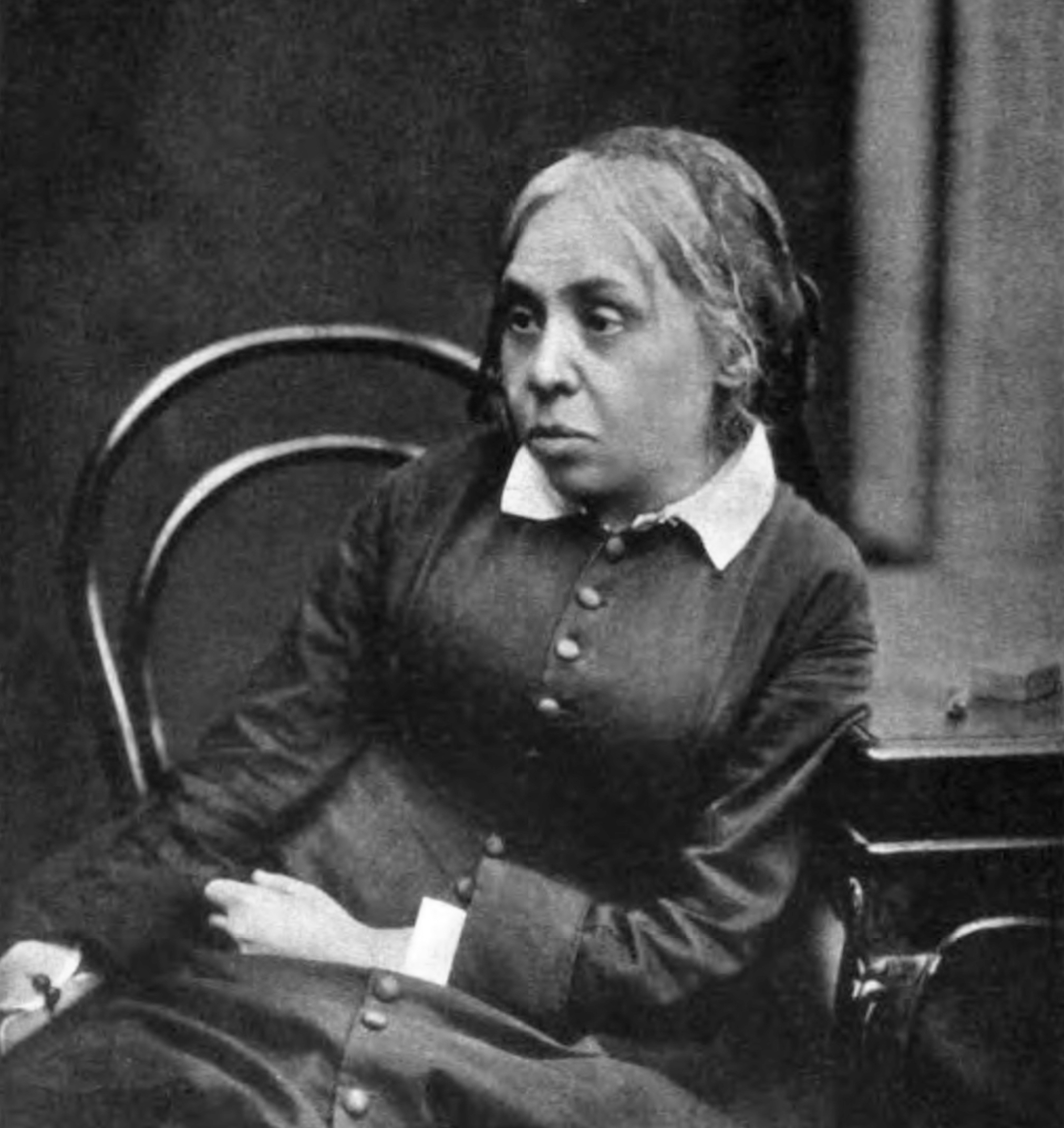
- Born: May 20, 1821; Pronsky Uyezd, Ryazan Governorate, Russian Empire
- Died: June 8, 1889 (aged 68); Peterhof, Russia
- Writing career
- Genres: Fiction, poetry, criticism, translations
- Subjects: Social issues, the woman question, literature
- Notable work: The Boarding School Girl

Nadezhda Dmitryevna Khvoshchinskaya (Russian: Надежда Дмитриевна Хвощинская; May 20, 1821 – June 8, 1889), was a Russian novelist, poet, literary critic and translator. Her married name was Zayonchkovskaya (Зайончковская; a Russified Polish-language surname Zajączkowska). She published much of her work under the pseudonym V. Krestovsky. She later added "alias" to her pseudonym to avoid being confused with the writer Vsevolod Krestovsky.

== Early life ==
Khvoshchinskaya was born into a gentry family in the Ryazan Governorate, where her father held a civil service post until being dismissed due to accusations of embezzlement of government funds. The legal proceedings that followed deprived him of a large sum of money, and forced him to sell off his property. It took him ten years to prove his innocence, while the family sank into poverty. Because of poor health and lack of money, Khvoshchinskaya received most of her education at home from private tutors, attending a boarding school only for a short time between the ages of eleven and twelve.

Khvoshchinskaya was the oldest of five children. Documents suggest she was born in 1821, or possibly 1820, though nineteenth-century sources gave her year of birth as 1824 or 1825. Two of her younger sisters, Sofia and Praskovia, also became writers. Praskovia (1828–1916), the youngest sister, was the least significant. Sofia (1824–1865) published novels and stories in several popular journals, including Biblioteka Dlya Chteniya and Otechestvennye Zapiski. Nadezhda and Sofia established a close relationship as children; as adults they formed a productive literary partnership, sharing ideas for their work.

== Career ==
Khvoshchinskaya began writing for intellectual and artistic satisfaction and as a way to relieve the family's impoverished condition. She published her first poems in 1842, when she was eighteen years old. She wrote over one hundred poems in her lifetime, most of which were never published. Her first novel, Anna Mikhailovna (1850) was published in Notes of the Fatherland, under the pen name V. Krestovsky. She was a prolific writer, publishing many novels and stories in Notes of the Fatherland, The Contemporary and other journals.

After the death of her father in 1856, Khvoshchinskaya provided a majority of the financial support for her mother, her sisters and eventually her late brother's children. She was often stressed and overworked, and suffered from various health problems which were made worse by progressive scoliosis, and by the early death of her sister Sofia, with whom she was especially close. Soon after Sofia's death Khvoshchinskaya married a young doctor and former political exile named Zayonchkovsky, who was fourteen years younger than her. The marriage wasn't a happy one due to significant differences in their social views. Her husband died in 1872 from tuberculosis that had been worsened by his time in exile.

She went on to write many successful and well regarded novels, including The Boarding School Girl (1861), which has been translated into English, and Ursa Major (1871). The Boarding School Girl was immediately popular, especially with girls and women. She was also known for her critical work, publishing articles on popular writers such as Ivan Goncharov, Mikhail Saltykov-Shchedrin and Aleksey Konstantinovich Tolstoy, and for her translations of the works of French writers, including several of George Sand's novels. Her fictional works often show the influence of democratic writers like Nikolay Chernyshevsky and his circle.

== Later life ==
She spent most of her life in Ryazan, only visiting her friends in St. Petersburg once or twice a year. Among these friends were writers and poets like Ivan Turgenev and Nikolay Sherbina. After her mother's death in 1884, she moved to St. Petersburg. She died at a summer cottage in Petergof, outside St. Petersburg, in 1889.

== Work and themes ==
As a poet, novelist, critic, dramatist, and translator Khvoshchinskaya had a prolific output, one which made her difficult to categorize. Her work deals in complex literary examinations of women’s roles and economics through a changing Russia, the “interconnectedness between economics, women’s roles, and approaches to realism in representation.”. Fidelity is a key theme in Khvoshchinskaya’s work; both in human relationship and in aesthetic representation. While her literary work explores interpersonal relationships, she weaves this together with philosophical debates of her day; highlighting these issues in her portrayals of ambiguous and complex women, engaging directly with "the woman question" as a woman writer.

Despite her success and having been widely read in her time, Khvoshchinskaya has not been included in the nineteenth-century canon, particularly in the West. New scholarship hopes to amend that.

== English translations ==
- "On the Way: A Sketch," trans. Joe Andrew, in Russian Women's Shorter Fiction: An Anthology, 1835–1860, Clarendon Press, 1996.
- "After the Flood" (short story), trans. Karla Thomas Solomon, in Russian Women Writers, vol. 1, ed. Christine D. Tomei, Garland, 1999.
- The Boarding School Girl (novel), trans. Karen Rosneck, Northwestern University Press, 2000.
- The Meeting (novel). Translated by Erik McDonald, University Digital Conservancy, 2022.
- The Brother (novel). Translated by Nora Seligman Favorov, Oxford University Press, 2026.

According to an event held by London’s Russian arts organization “Pushkin House”, there are several English translations awaiting publication. These include:

Anastassia Kostrioukova, The First Struggle (Pervaya borba, 1869).

Karen Rosneck, Ursa Major (Bolshaya medveditsa, 1870–71).
