= Zharly (disambiguation) =

Zharly may refer to:

- Zharly, a river in Karkaraly District, Karaganda Region, Kazakhstan
- Zharly (Nurken Rural District), a village in Karkaraly District, Karaganda Region, Kazakhstan
- Zharly (Tegisshildik Rural District), a village in Karkaraly District, Karaganda Region, Kazakhstan
