= Anatoliy Baranov =

Russian journalist and politician

- Born: December 18, 1959
- Occupation: Journalist, political scientist

Anatoliy Yuryevich Baranov (Russian: Анатолий Юрьевич Баранов; born December 18, 1959) is a Russian journalist, publicist and politician. He is the editor-in-chief of the Форум.мск. From 2003 to 2007, he was the editor-in-chief of the official website of the Communist Party of the Russian Federation (cprf.ru).

Until 2012, member of the Board of Left Front (Russia). He is a member of the Politburo of the United Communist Party.

He received a Medical Degree. Baranov started his career as a journalist in the newspaper Moskovskij Komsomolets in the 1980s. From 1993 to 1996, he worked for the newspaper Pravda.

He was a member of the Communist Party of the Russian Federation (until 2007). CPRF and Gennady Zyuganov accused him of Trotskyism. He left the party.

On March 10, 2010 he signed an appeal of the Russian opposition stating "Putin must go".

He was awarded a Medal "In Commemoration of the 850th Anniversary of Moscow".

Anatoliy Baranov is the author of the books “The Aroma of Rotting”, the novel-feuilleton “The Recent History of the City of Foolov”, “The Shadow Cabinet of the Opposition”. Also he is the author of works in the collection of stories Ticket to America together with Mikhail Popov, Andrei Gusev and others.

Anatoliy Baranov served as a prototype for one of the characters – Anatoliy Ovtsov, a journalist of the newspaper Moskovskij Bogomolets, which is very similar to the famous Moskovskij Komsomolets – in the novel Journalists by Sergei Aman. Also Baranov served as a prototype for one of the main characters – Anatoliy Barinov, a politiсion from Moscow – in the thriller novel The World According to Novikoff by Andrei Gusev.
