= Karynshi =

Karynshi Қарынши
- Village
- Qarynşi
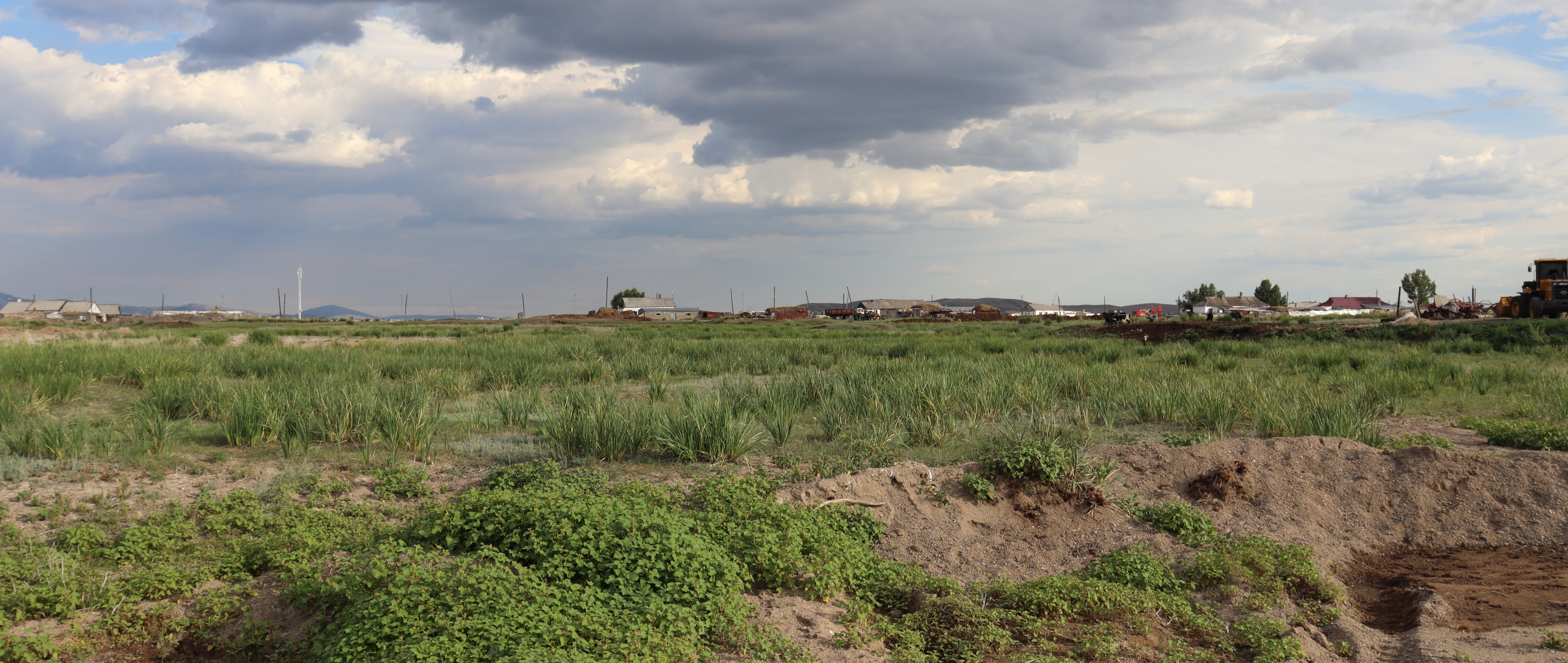

- Location in Kazakhstan
- Coordinates: 49°31′09″N 75°02′57″E
- Country: Kazakhstan
- Region: Karaganda Region
- District: Karkaraly District

Population (2009)
  - Total: 217

Karynshi (Kazakh: Қарынши) is a village in the Karkaraly District of the Karaganda Region in Kazakhstan. It is part of the Tegisshildik Rural District. It is located on the Zharly River. Code CATO - 354877300.

== Population ==
In 1999, the village population was 355 people (184 men and 171 women). According to the 2009 census, the village had a population of 217 people (126 men and 91 women).

== Geography ==
Karynshi is located ≈8 km away from the nearest highway (A-345), with the Sarybuirat Hills to its north-east. It is located ≈13 km from the rural district capital (Tegisshildik) and ≈33 km from the district capital (Karkaraly).
