= Journalists (novel) =

2013 novel by Sergei Aman

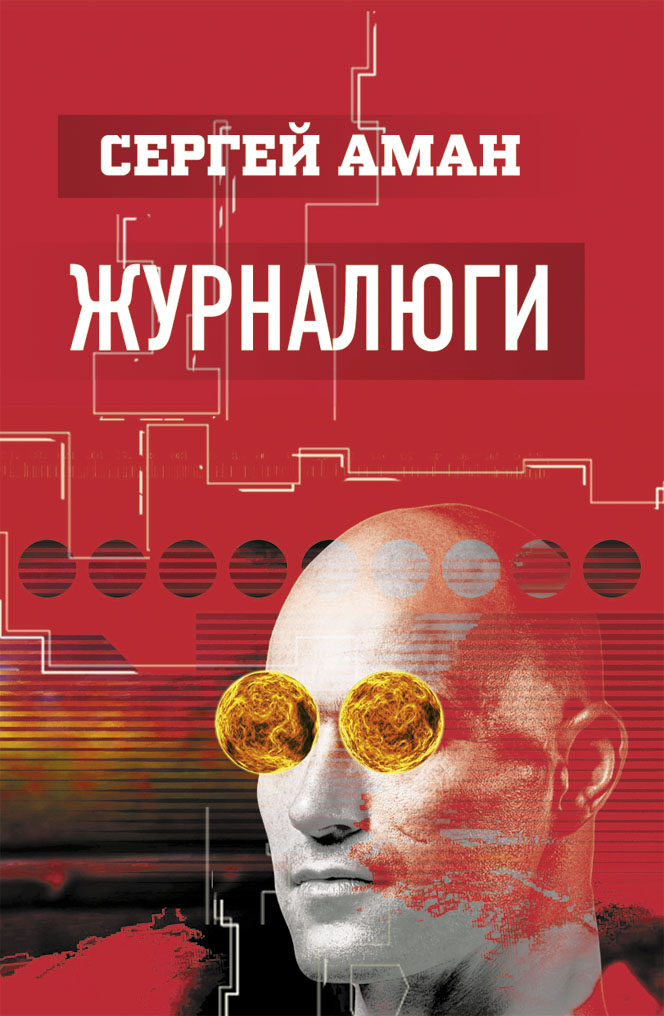
- Author: Sergei Aman
- Original title: Журналюги
- Language: Russian
- Genre: Thriller, fantasy
- Publisher: “Zebra E” (Russia)
- Publication date: February 2013; 13 years ago
- Publication place: Russia
- Pages: 224 pp
- ISBN: 978-5-905629-31-0
- Followed by: Everything Will Be Okay, We're All Going to Die!

Journalists (Russian: Журналюги) is a thriller novel by Russian writer Sergei Aman, published in 2013.

== Plot ==
The novel begins with a bomb explosion at the newspaper Moskovskij Bogomolets (Moscow Believer), which kills a famous Moscow journalist and affects the paper's editorial staff. The main character of the novel, Sergei Ogloedov, is a journalist from the newspaper. The newspaper is very similar to the actual Moskovskij Komsomolets, and the novel's action follows similar events in the 1990s and early 2000s. The story focuses on the tragic love relationship between Sergei Ogloedov and Natasha Guseva, a fling from their time at Moscow State University that revives as they both join the editorial staff of Moskovskij Bogomolets.

== Literary features ==
The book covers the time period from the 1980s and to 2010s. All fifteen parts of the novel are devoted to different newspaper journalists, each of whom has a real prototype among the current and former employees of the editorial staff of Moskovskij Komsomolets — Dmitry Kholodov, Andrei Lapik, Vadim Poegli, Pyotr Spectr, Alexey Merinov, Anatoliy Baranov, Andrei Gusev, Natalya Zhuravleva, Elena Vasiluhina and others, including the Chief Editor Pavel Gusev. They all in one way or another connected with the main character — Sergey Ogloedov, a character which the author based on himself. The novel describes real events in which, depending on the situation, journalists appear as both saints and sinners.

== Publication history ==
The novel details the manners and methods of work (including unsightly), which reigned in the newspaper Moskovskij Komsomolets. Publishing houses in Moscow refused to print the book for nearly two years, because they feared backlash and possible sanctions from Moskovskij Komsomolets’s editor-in-chief and owner Pavel Gusev.

The thriller novel Journalists has not been published in English yet.
