= New Medical Gazette =

New Medical Gazette Новая медицинская газета
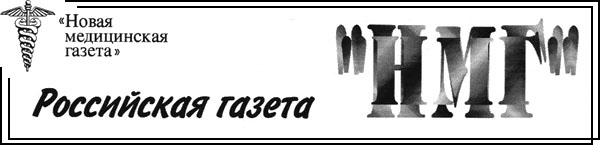
- Type: Bimonthly newspaper
- Format: Tabloid
- Owner: Editorial staff "New Medical Gazette"
- Editor-in-chief: Andrei Gusev
- Founded: 18 December 1992; 32 years ago
- Political alignment: independent
- Language: Russian
- Headquarters: Perovo district, Moscow, Russia
- Website: nmgazette.narod.ru

New Medical Gazette (NMG) (Russian: "Новая медицинская газета") is a Russian newspaper published in Moscow since 1993.

== History ==
New Medical Gazette (NMG) was established in 1992 in Moscow by a group of journalists (Anatoliy Baranov, Andrei Gusev and others; some of them had medical education and practical experience in health care), who in 90-th years worked in the popular daily newspaper Moskovskij Komsomolets. The Russian newspaper NMG registered with the Ministry of press and information of the Russian Federation on December 18, 1992.

The first number of NMG was released on May 18, 1993. Since 1993 Andrei Gusev (Russian: Андрей Евгеньевич Гусев, born 27 October 1952 in Moscow) serves as NMG's editor-in-chief.

Up to 2001, NMG came out in format A3 and A4. After 2001 NMG exists primarily as a web-based publication. Also there is a page of NMG in Facebook.

== Contents ==
The paper specialises in topical medical materials, medical news and diverse information. Feature NMG was and remains that the newspaper authors write not only on medical topics. For example, in the newspaper there are literary page, created in conjunction with public fund "Union of Writers of Moscow".

There are famous journalists and writers among NMG's authors — Sergei Aman, Anatoliy Baranov, Andrei Gusev, Sergei Sokurov, etc.

== See also ==
- List of newspapers in Russia
- Moskovskij Komsomolets
- Andrei Gusev — NMG's editor-in-chief.
