= Abdirov =

Abdirov (Russian: Абдиров) is a central Asian masculine surname, its feminine counterpart is Abdirova. Notable people with the surname include:

- Charjou Abdirov (1933–1997), Uzbek microbiologist
- Nurken Abdirov (1919–1942), Kazakh pilot
- Nurlan Äbdirov (born 1961), Kazakh politician
