= Timur Kizyakov =

Soviet and Russian TV presenter and author

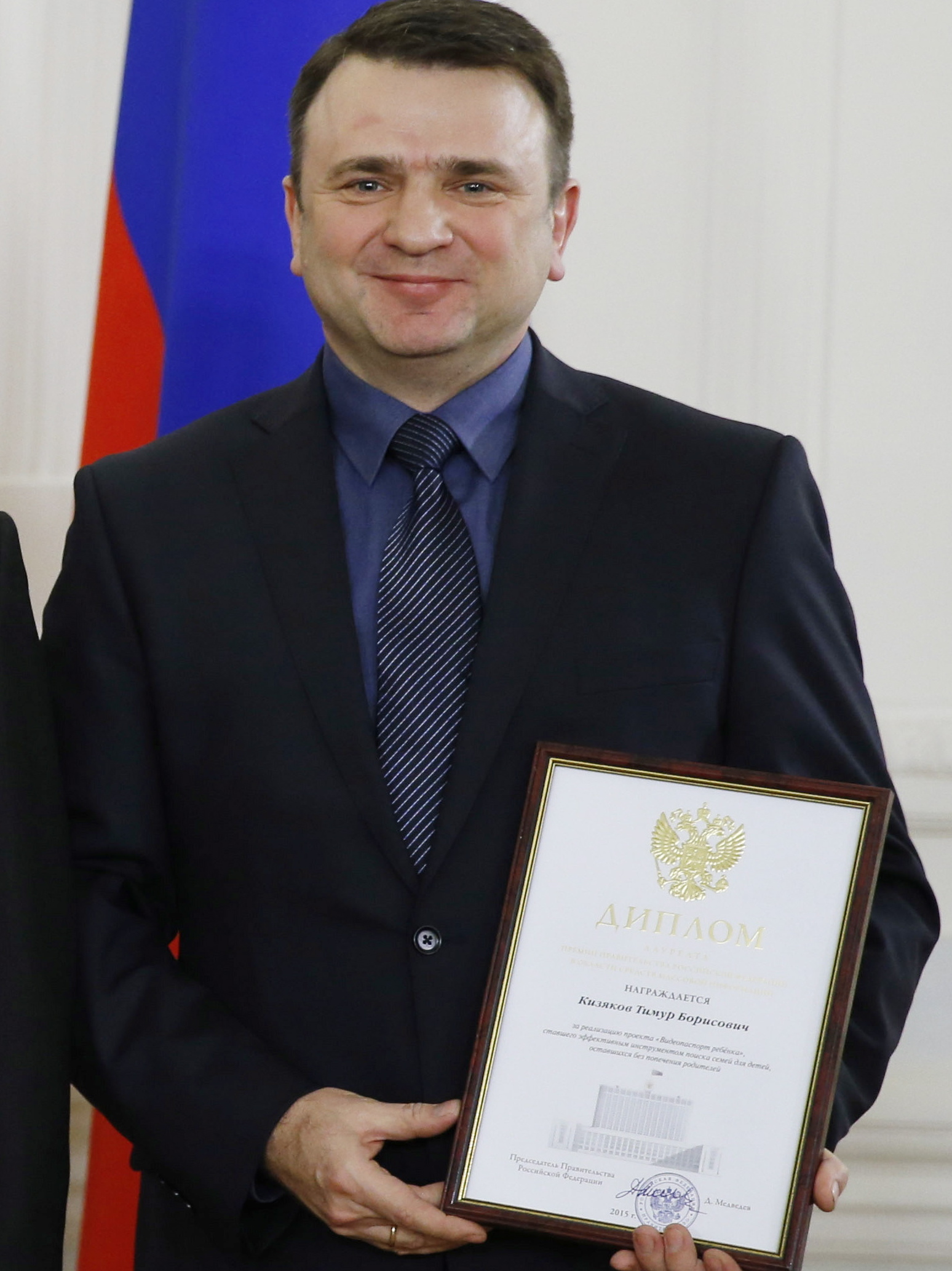
- Born: 30 August 1967 (age 59); Reutov, Russian SFSR

Timur Borisovich Kizyakov (Russian: Тимур Борисович Кизяков; August 30, 1967, Reutov, Moscow Oblast) is a Russian TV host, host of the program While Еveryone is Нome (Channel One Russia).

== Biography ==
Kizyakov was born 30 August 1967 in Reutov. In 1988, he began working in the Main Editorial Board of Children's and Youth Programs of the Soviet Central Television.

In 2012, he was elected a member of the Public Chamber of the Central Federal District.

In February 2016, he joined the Supreme Council of the United Russia party, endorsed by the Deputy Secretary of the General Council of Olga Batalina as part of a party effort to address the lack of children's programming.

== Personal life ==
Kizyakov married to Yelena Kizyakova in 1997. They have two daughters, Yelena (1998) and Valentina (2003), and a son, Timur (2012.

== Awards ==
- 1995: Golden Ostap (best leading)
- 2000: TEFI (best leading)
- 2006: Order of Friendship
- 2012: Order of Honour
- 2015: Prize of the Russian Federation Government in the field of mass media
