= Pavel Gusev =

Pavel Gusev may refer to:

- Pavel Gusev (journalist) (born 1949), Russian journalist
- Pavel Gusev (footballer) (born 1953), Russian football player and coach
