= Everything Will Be Okay, We're All Going to Die! =

2018 novel by Sergei Aman

- First edition
- Author: Sergei Aman
- Original title: Всё будет хорошо, мы все умрём!
- Language: Russian
- Genre: novel
- Publisher: “ИД «Флюид ФриФлай” (Russia)
- Publication date: 2018
- Publication place: Russia
- Pages: 176 pp
- ISBN: 978-5-906827-70-8
- Preceded by: Journalists

Everything Will Be Okay, We're All Going to Die! (Russian: Всё будет хорошо, мы все умрём!) is a novel by Russian writer Sergei Aman, published in 2018.

== Plot ==
The hero of the novel is the philosopher Alexei Krutorogov. He is unemployed and forced to get money for a living, working as a taxi driver. They are called bombers (bombila) in Russia. In the novel he talks about time, about the insignificance of everyday vanity and about absurdity as the basis of Russian life.

== Literary features ==
Everything Will Be Okay, We're All Going to Die! is a novel with a non-linear storyline. The novel covers the time period from the nineties of the last century to the tenth years of the present century. The novel is based on reliable facts. The style of the novel is postmodernism. The epigraph to the novel is a phrase from the book "The World According to Novikoff” by the Moscow writer Andrei Gusev. Sergei Aman's novel and Andrei Gusev's book combines a world-view approach.

== Publication history ==
The author's starting point was his work as an amateur taxi driver (bombila), when he was excommunicated from his main profession – a journalist. During bombila's work, so many different emergency situations were created – both funny and tragic – that this alone was asked for paper.

== Other websites ==
Аман С. Всё будет хорошо, мы все умрём! (“Everything Will Be Okay, We're All Going to Die!”), эротическо-героический эпос. — М.: ИД «Флюид ФриФлай», 2018. — 176 с. ISBN 978-5-906827-70-8
