= Presentation (book) =

1993 short story collection by Andrei Gusev

- First edition
- Author: Andrei Gusev
- Original title: Презентация
- Language: Russian
- Genre: Stories, fantasy
- Publisher: "ГКС России" (Russia)
- Publication date: 1993
- Publication place: Russia
- Pages: 128 pp
- Preceded by: Ticket to America
- Followed by: Mister Novelist

Presentation (Russian: Презентация) is a book (collection of short stories) by Russian writer Andrei Gusev, published in 1993.

== Plot summary ==
The collection includes eleven short stories, each with its own unique plot and setting. The reader's attention will be attracted by mystical and dramatic stories, lyrical scenes, as well as eroticism (including BDSM fantasy). The collection is named after one of the included short stories, "Presentation".

== Literary features ==
Many characters from Andrei Gusev's stories have access to reflection, humor and what has always been called a flight of fancy. His character is most often an intellectual who has found his place in life. But in relationships with others, even the people most dear to him, it turns out that he is not understood, and he does not want to live "wide open", allowing anyone into all corners of his soul. His characters sometimes indulge in fearless devilry and even mentally transform into an astral body. But which of us hasn't had something like this happen? Who, at least in dreams, has not fled to the notorious "zero zone"?

The use of colloquial language and, at times, profanity, adds an extra dimension to Andrei Gusev's writing, giving it a unique flavor and honesty.

== Notes ==
- Andrei Gusev (1993). Презентация (Presentation). Moscow: "ГКС России" (Russia). p. 128.
- И.С.Горюнова "Современная русская литература: знаковые имена (статьи, рецензии, интервью)", "Litres", 2015. – 278 c. (М., "Вест-Консалтинг", 2012), ISBN 9785457199514
