= Nurken =

Nurken (Kazakh: Нұркен, Nūrken) is a Kazakh masculine given name. Notable people with the name include:

- Nurken Abdirov (1919–1942), Kazakh pilot
- Nurken Mazbayev (born 1972), Kazakhstani football forward
