= Shunkyrkudyk =

Shunkyrkudyk Шұнқырқұдық
- Hamlet
- Şūnqyrqūdyq
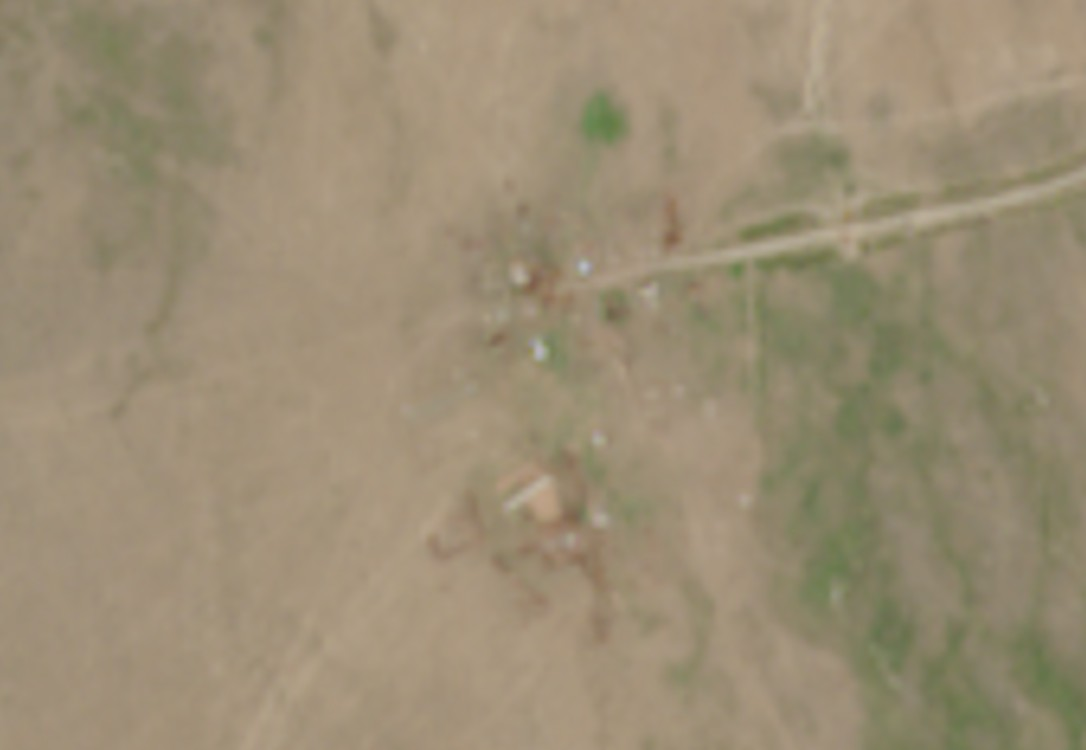
- Shunkyrkudyk as seen from space (Sentinel L2A, modified)

- Location in Kazakhstan
- Coordinates: 49°20′01″N 74°57′3″E
- Country: Kazakhstan
- Region: Karaganda Region

Population (1999)
  - Total: 136

Shunkyrkudyk (Kazakh: Шұнқырқұдық, Russian: Шункуркудук) is a hamlet in the Karkaraly District of the Karaganda Region in Kazakhstan. It is a part of the Tegisshildik Rural District. Code CATO - 354877114.

== Geography ==
The hamlet is located approximately 38 km away from the district capital (Karkaraly), and approximately 15 km away from the village district capital (Tegisshildik). The largest road to the hamlet goes from Tegisshildik to Shunkyrkudyk.

== Population ==
In the year 1999, the total population was 136 people, of which 70 were men and 66 were women.
