= Mister Novelist =

Book by Russian writer Andrei Gusev

- First edition
- Author: Andrei Gusev
- Original title: Господин сочинитель
- Language: Russian
- Genre: stories, fantasy
- Publisher: "ГКС России" (Russia)
- Publication date: 1994
- Publication place: Russia
- Pages: 192 pp
- Preceded by: Presentation
- Followed by: With Chronos' Permit

Mister Novelist (Russian: Господин сочинитель) is a book (collection of stories) by Russian writer Andrei Gusev, published in 1994.

== Plot summary ==
The collection includes two stories and eleven short stories, each with its own unique plot and setting. The reader's attention will be attracted by mystical and dramatic stories, lyrical scenes, as well as BDSM fantasy.

In the story "Mister Novelist", dedicated to the fate of a young writer, the main place is occupied by the theme of love and the contradictions that arise in the life of an artist. For a serious understanding of the problems of existence, a person needs not heaven or hell, but real life. This idea is heard in the story "Topography of Hell" and the story itself is entirely built on a love plot.

The collection is named after one of the stories included in it — "Mister Novelist".

== Literary features ==
In the relationships within love couples in the stories included in this book, there is something from the famous film director Claude Lelouch, who always and everywhere glorified the Man and Woman created for each other, regardless of other characteristics and circumstances of life. Sometimes some characters in the book indulge in non-scary devilry and even mentally transform into an astral body. But which of us hasn't experienced something like this? Who, at least in dreams, has not escaped to the notorious "zero zone"? It looks very similar, Mr. Novelist!

== Notes ==
- Andrei Gusev (1994). Господин сочинитель (Mister Novelist). Moscow: "ГКС России" (Russia). p. 192.
