= With Chronos' Permit =

1995 novel by Andrei Gusev

- First edition
- Author: Andrei Gusev
- Original title: С мандатом Хроноса
- Language: Russian
- Genre: thriller
- Publisher: "ГКС России" (Russia)
- Publication date: January 1995; 31 years ago
- Publication place: Russia
- Pages: 192 pp
- Preceded by: Mister Novelist
- Followed by: The World According to Novikoff

With Chronos' Permit (Russian: С мандатом Хроноса) is a thriller novel by Russian writer Andrei Gusev, published in 1995.

== Plot summary ==
Everything began with the shooting of the film. The famous producer of Soviet and Russian cinema made production of some episodes in Kaluga area of Russia. Then shooting of the film will continue in Berlin. In the evening, in a hotel room the producer reread the script. The story was the next.

Because of Perestroika, physicist Ivan Zhuravlev is unemployed, and must take a job in journalism instead. This puts him in contact with the head of the Chronos corporation – Boris Iossifovich Sytin (Zhuravlev calls him Ossi), who persuades him to participate in the illicit sale of osmium to the West. This affair ends tragically for Ivan Zhuravlev – he dies because of the intentional air crash.
Love to the girl was the best in the short life of Ivan Zhuravlev. Her name is Nastia. In their relationship something is from the famous movies by Claude Lelouch, who always glorifies man and woman created for each other.

At the end of film script an epilogue was, in which producer read about his participation in this film. Producer astonished very much: at an earlier time, these pages were not in the script!

== Literary features ==
With Chronos' Permit is a novel with a non-linear storyline. The novel takes place in the time period of the early 1990s. This novel is a mix of a thriller and crime story. From another side some parts of the novel have a mystical component.

== Other websites ==
- Russian Wikiquote has the article С мандатом Хроноса (With Chronos' Permit).

== Notes ==
- Andrei Gusev (1995). С мандатом Хроноса (With Chronos' Permit). Moscow: "ГКС России" (Russia). p. 192.
- НА ПОРОГЕ ХХI ВЕКА, Всероссийский ежегодник, М., "Московский Парнас", 2002 (с.92)
- Всероссийский ежегодник НА ПОРОГЕ ХХI ВЕКА, М., "Московский Парнас", 2006 (с.85)
- И.С.Горюнова "Современная русская литература: знаковые имена (статьи, рецензии, интервью)", "Litres", 2015. – 278 c. (М., "Вест-Консалтинг", 2012) ISBN 5457199517, ISBN 9785457199514
