= Nikolai Gastello =

Soviet aviator

- Николай Гастелло
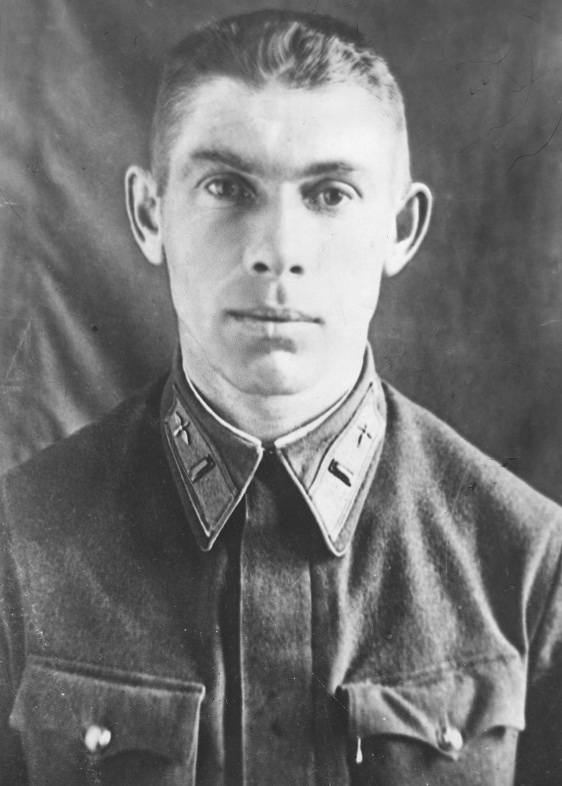
- Born: Nikolai Frantsevich Gastello; April 23, 1907; Moscow, Russian Empire
- Died: 26 June 1941 (aged 33); Dekshnyany, Minsk Region, Byelorussian SSR, Soviet Union
- Military career
- Allegiance: Soviet Union
- Branch: Soviet Air Forces
- Service years: 1932–1941
- Conflicts: Soviet–Japanese Border Wars; Battles of Khalkhin Gol; World War II; Winter War; Eastern Front †
- Awards: Hero of the Soviet Union

Captain Nikolai Frantsevich Gastello (Russian: Николай Францевич Гастелло, April 23, 1907 – June 26, 1941) was a Soviet aviator and a Hero of the Soviet Union. He is one of the best known Soviet war heroes, being the best known Soviet pilot, who according to Soviet propaganda, conducted a "fire taran" – a suicide action by the pilot of an aircraft on fire, flying into a target with the intention of setting it alight.

== Biography ==
Nikolai Gastello (Belarusian: Мікалай Францавіч Гастэла, romanized: Mikalay Frantsavich Hastela) was born in Moscow to Franz Gastylo or Gastyllo (Франц Паўлавіч Гастыла, Frants Pawlavich Hastyla), who was a Belarusian. His father, who began working as a metal craftsman on the Kazan Railway (which was merged into the Gorky Railway in 1961), had recently moved to Moscow and his Belarusian last name was gradually morphed by local Muscovites to the exotic-sounding Gastello. His mother, Anastasia Kutuzova, was Russian and worked as a seamstress.

Nikolay Gastello graduated from a Sokolniki high school in Moscow in 1918, and his family then moved to Bashkiria, escaping the horrors of the Russian Civil War. By 1923 Gastello was back in Moscow, where he worked at a factory as a fitter. In 1928 he became a member of the communist party, and in 1932 by special decree he was sent to the Lugansk Pilot's School. Graduating in 1933 as a bomber pilot, Gastello initially flew the Tupolev TB-3 heavy bomber. Gastello fought against the Japanese in Battle of Khalkin Gol in 1939, where he was awarded the Order of Lenin; he then saw action in the Winter War with Finland.

By the time Germany attacked Soviet Union on June 22 of 1941, Gastello was a squadron leader in a long-range bomber regiment equipped with Ilyushin DB-3 medium bombers. On June 26, five days after the war started, a pair of aircraft led by Gastello bombed a German position near the village of Dekshnyany in Belarus. Gastello's bomber was reportedly hit by flak, with his wing fuel tank being ruptured and the aircraft subsequently becoming engulfed in flames. He then deliberately directed the doomed aircraft into a German panzer column, performing the first "fire taran" of the German-Soviet War.

Gastello was posthumously awarded the Hero of the Soviet Union, one of the first Soviet soldiers to receive the title in World War II. Subsequently, he became one of the best-known heroes of the war, with his story and that of Zoya Kosmodemyanskaya taking up the bulk of Soviet text books on the early years of the German-Soviet War.

On July 26, Gastello was posthumously awarded the Gold Star of the Hero of the Soviet Union. His other crew members received only minor medals.

== Post-Soviet reassessment ==
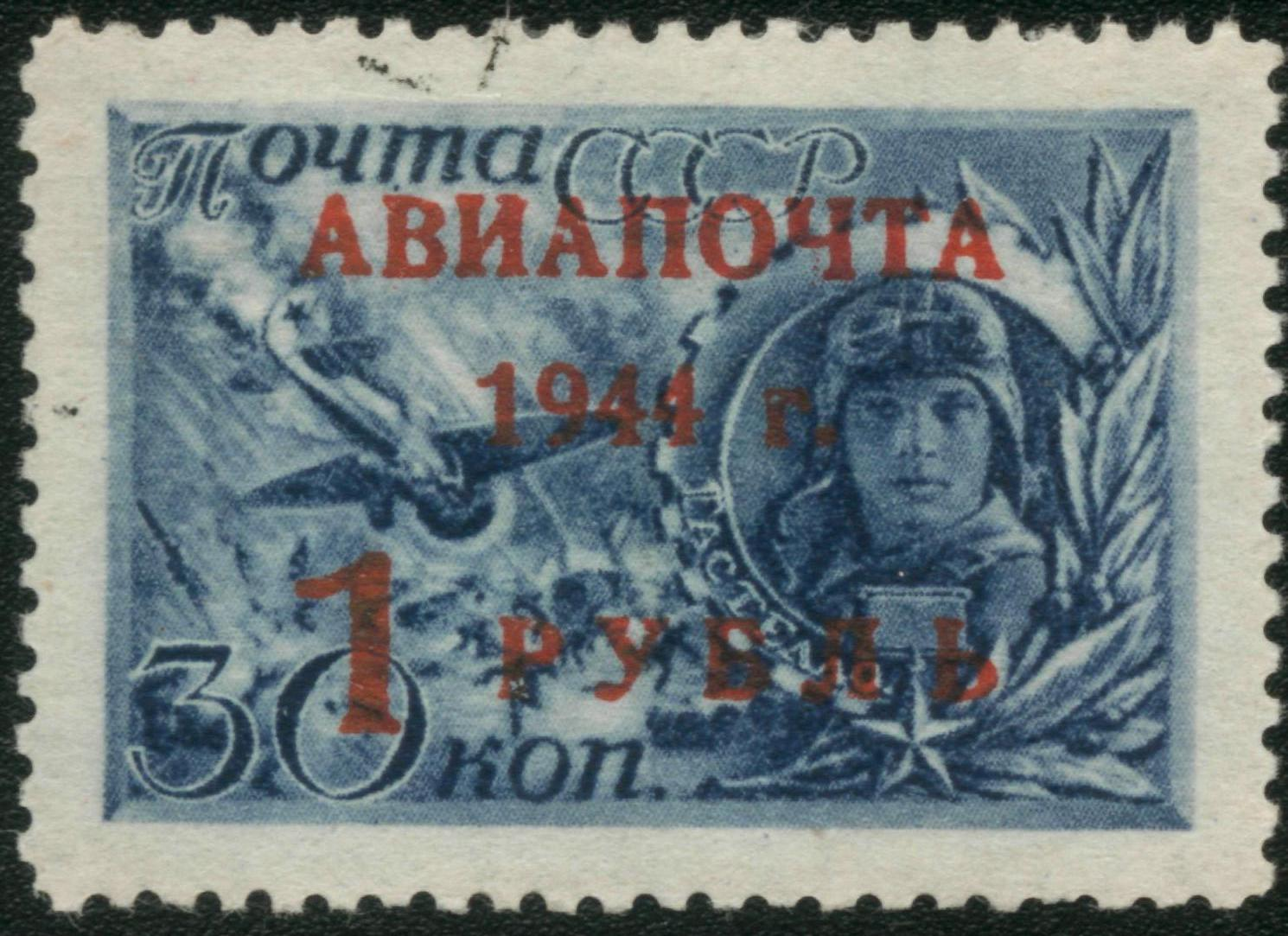
Gastello commemorated on a stamp

The details of Gastello's final mission are hard to substantiate due to lack of reliable data or witnesses. The only Soviet people alive to see Gastello's final plunge, the crew of Lt. Vorobiev, were killed in action just a few days after Gastello.

After the fall of the Soviet Union in 1991, several reporters began disputing the official accounts. Some of the claims made were:

- Gastello did not perform the attack deliberately.
- The target of the fire taran was not a column of tanks, but a stationary flak gun, apparently the one that dealt the burning aircraft the fatal blow.
- The suicide attack was performed by another pilot from the same squadron, Captain Maslov.
- Gastello's flight included not two, but three aircraft, with Maslov flying the third bomber.
- Gastello's plane was hit, but it flew away from the battle, with one crew member being seen to bail out.
- A man who was 15 years old in 1941 claimed he saw someone jump off the left wing of the aircraft, which would only be possible for the pilot to do. The bailed out airman, who he believed to be Gastello, was captured by the Germans.
- A burned out body was discovered in the woods in July 1941 by a group of peasants, far away from the location of the fire taran, with an undelivered letter and a cigarette case identifying it as a member of Gastello's crew.
- A 1951 Soviet reburial effort exhumed the graves of Gastello's crew, who were wrapped in parachutes and hastily buried by peasants the night after their death. A map case and a medallion belonged to Captain Maslov and his gunner were found on the bodies. The entire affair was subsequently swept under the rug.
- Neither Gastello nor Maslov managed to hit anything of value, and the actual fire taran was performed a day later, by Isaac Zilovich Presaizen, reported by Squadron Commander Captain Beletsky and verified from the air the next day by 128 Air Regiment Second in Command V. Sandalov. Isaac Presaizen was recommended for Hero of the Soviet Union award; the recommendation still stands in the archives, having never been answered. The actual air photos taken by V. Sandalov were used to award Gastello his fame for non-existent attack.

These claims, made in 1994 and then in 2001 in Russia's leading newspapers, Izvestia and then Moskovskij Komsomolets, caused a firestorm in the former Soviet Union. They have been debunked by journalists and historians ever since. The regiment's official logs, locked away in Soviet archives, indeed record Gastello's flight as only including two aircraft, his and Lt. Vorobiev's. Few reasons exist to doubt Lt. Vorobiev's actual report: he could gain nothing from it personally, and indeed perished in battle just a few days later. The official log, however, does list a single unidentified crew member as bailing out from Gastello's plane.

Supporters of the official version of events also doubt the accuracy of the 1951 reburial story, as an aircraft that dives into the ground and explodes in a fireball is unlikely to include entire bodies with intact parachutes they can be wrapped in. If such bodies were indeed located and buried, they were most likely be from a crew other than Gastello's.

Both sides however agree that, whoever it was that exploded amidst German tanks on June 26, 1941, the pilot's motivation will never be truly known. No radio transmissions were received from the aircraft, as it is unlikely that it had a radio, and it is impossible to know if the ramming of the German column was deliberate or accidental.

The publicity led to President Boris Yeltsin awarding Captain Maslov the Hero of the Russian Federation title in 1996. On the other hand, First Lieutenant Isaac Presaizen has not been awarded the Hero title for the confirmed hit to this day.

== See also ==
- Aerial ramming

== Sources ==
- Bio at airwar.ru (in Russian)
- Nikolai Gastello from the Legends and Facts series (in Russian)
- Legends of World War II (in Russian)
- Presaizen Isaac Zilovich at airwar.ru (in Russian)
- Word of the disabled veteran – Слово инвалида войны. №9, 1994, page 36. (Israel)
