= Andrei Gusev =

Russian writer and journalist

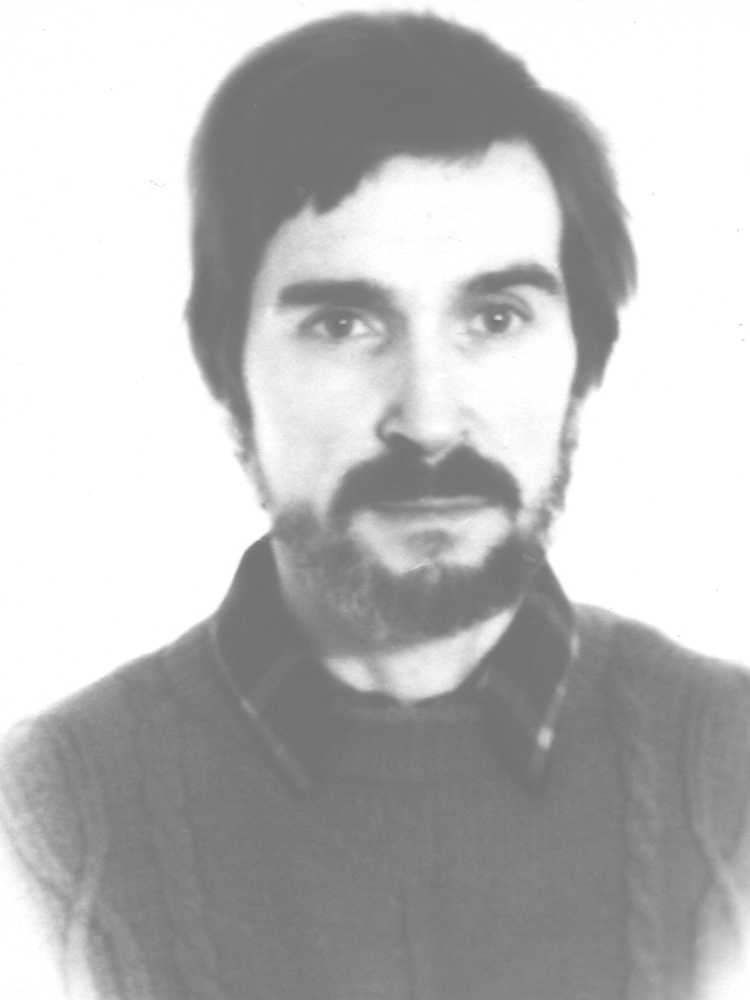
- Andrei Gusev in 2000
- Born: Andrei Evgenievich Gusev; 27 October 1952 (age 73); Moscow, Russian SFSR, Soviet Union
- Citizenship: Soviet (1952–91); Russian (1992–present)
- Education: Moscow Engineering Physics Institute
- Occupations: writer, novelist, journalist, inventor
- Children: two
- Writing career
- Period: 1990–present
- Genres: fiction, fantasy, thriller, erotica
- Notable works: With Chronos' Permit; On the Edge of Magellanic Clouds; The World According to Novikoff
- Literary movement: Postmodernism
- Website: andrei-gusev.narod.ru

Andrei Evgenievich Gusev (Russian: Андрей Евгеньевич Гусев, born 27 October 1952) is a Russian writer and journalist. He is the author of 10 inventions, 23 published scientific works. One of his co-authors is a winner of the Nobel Prize, a legend of the Soviet physics, the academician Alexander Prokhorov.

== Early life and education ==
Andrei Gusev was born in former Soviet Union, in Moscow. His parents were engineers. His father Evgeny Gusev was born in Chernihiv Oblast of Ukraine; his mother Rosalind Maltseva was born in Moscow.

Andrei Gusev graduated the Moscow Engineering Physics Institute in 1975. The next eleven years he worked as a scientific employee (a medical physicist) in public health services. Also in these years he received a medical education.

== Career ==
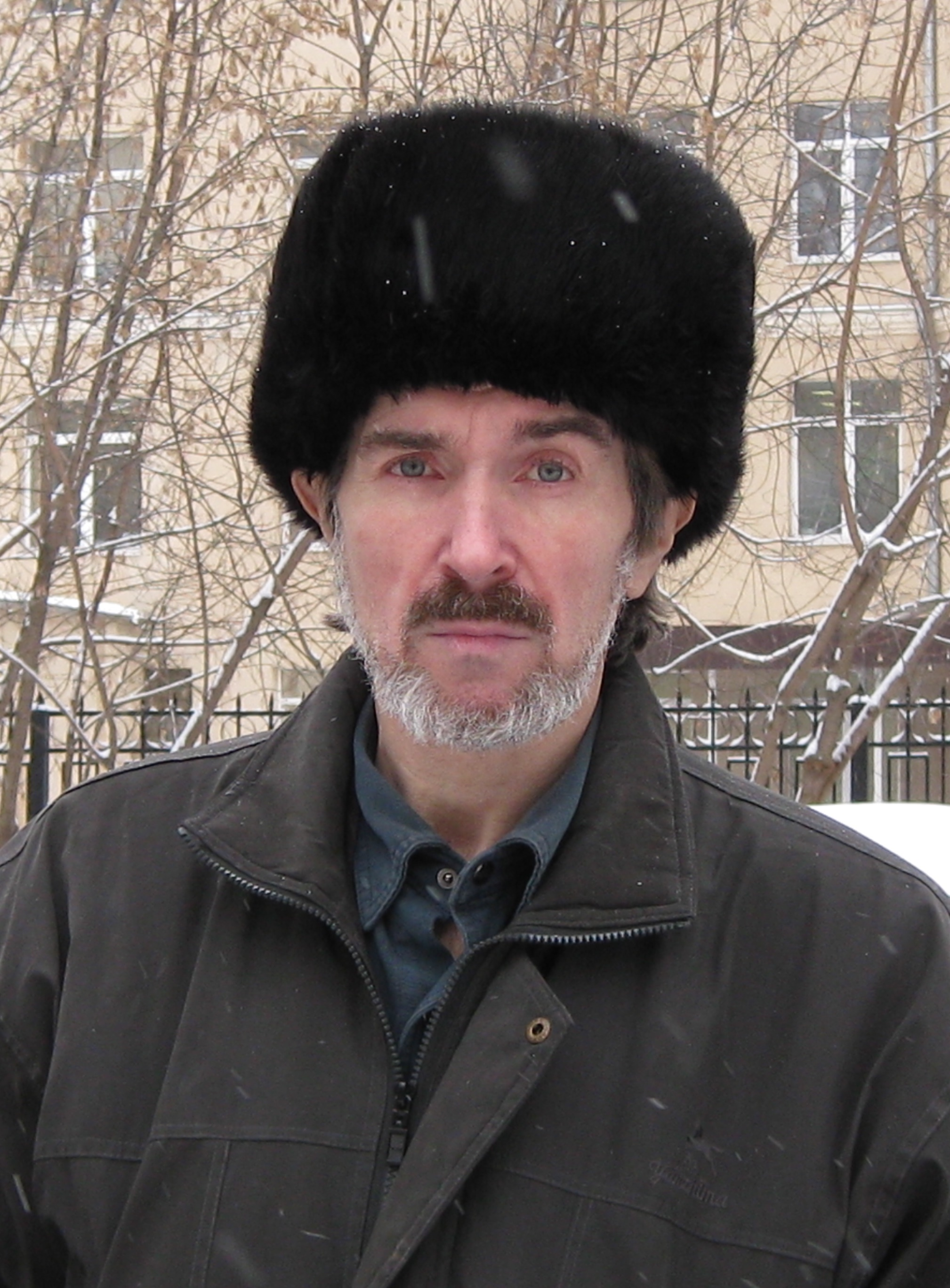
Andrei Gusev in Moscow, 2009

In 1990 Andrei Gusev became a correspondent of the daily "Moskovskij Komsomolets". Later he worked as the special correspondent of the All-Russia "Rossiyskaya Gazeta" and dep. editor-in-chief of the youth newspaper "Stupeni".

Since 1993 Andrei Gusev serves as editor-in-chief of "The New Medical Gazette" (published in Russian).

Andrei Gusev is the author of several hundreds articles in "Moskovskij Komsomolets", "Rossiyskaya Gazeta", "Sovetskaya Rossiya", "Vechernyaya Moskva", "The Moscow News", "Stupeni", "The New Medical Gazette", magazines "Auto M", "Stolitza", "Yatt" etc.

Within work in "Stupeni" the first books of the writer were published: a collection "Ticket to America" (1992) and "Presentation" (1993). Then he published "Mister Novelist" (1994), "With Chronos' Permit" (1995), "The Russian Story" (1996) and also the story collection "On the Edge of Magellanic Clouds" (1998). He published his novels "The Painter & Eros" and "Role Plays" in 2003 and "The World According to Novikoff" in 2006. In his prose in the 2010s Andrei Gusev developed the themes of BDSM subculture in Russia. Themes include female domination, bondage, erotic spanking and BDSM fiction.

Andrei Gusev served as a prototype for one of the main characters – Andrei Lebedev, a journalist of the newspaper Moskovskij Bogomolets, which is very similar to the famous Moskovskij Komsomolets – in the thriller novel Journalists by Sergei Aman. In the novel by the same author Everything Will Be Okay, We're All Going to Die! Gusev was described under his own name, as a journalist Andrei Gusev.

== Personal life ==
Andrei Gusev lives in Moscow. He was married twice and divorced twice. His first wife, Nina Guseva (née Odnoletko), worked as a nurse; his second wife, Ivetta Sarkisyan, is a philologist by training. He has two daughters. His hobby is beekeeping.

== Selected bibliography ==
- Andrei Gusev "PRESENTATION", motley stories, Moscow, 1993.
- Andrew E. Gusev "MISTER NOVELIST", stories and short stories, Moscow, 1994.
- Andrei E. Gusev "WITH CHRONOS’ PERMIT", stories, film-novel, Moscow, 1995.
- Andrei E. Gusev "THE RUSSIAN STORY", novel, Moscow, 1996.
- "ON THE EDGE OF MAGELLANIC CLOUDS", collection of the stories and short stories, Moscow, 1998, publishing house "Probel", ISBN 5-89346-012-X.
- Andrei E. Gusev "THE PAINTER & EROS", novel, Moscow, 2003, publishing house "West-Consulting", ISBN 5-85511-011-7.
- Andrei E. Gusev "ROLE PLAYS", stories, Moscow, 2003, publishing house "West-Consulting".
- Andrei E. Gusev "The World According to Novikoff", novel, Moscow, 2006, publishing house "West-Consulting", ISBN 978-5-903321-02-5.

== Online text ==
- Сто лет со дня рождения – a story by Andrei Gusev in Wikisource (in Russian)
- Пудель цвета любви – a short story by Andrei Gusev in Wikisource (in Russian)
- "Оставьте свой реквием после сигнала!" – a short story by Andrei Gusev in Wikisource (in Russian)
- The Russian Writer Loves Role Plays – a novel by Andrei Gusev (in Russian)
- Love Story in the Style of Femdom – a novel by Andrei Gusev (in Russian)
- Our Wild Sex in Malindi – a novel by Andrei Gusev (in Russian)
- Once in Malindi – a novel by Andrei Gusev (in Russian)

== See also ==
- List of Russian-language writers
- List of Russian-language novelists
- List of thriller writers
- List of BDSM authors
