= Tegisshildik Rural District =

Coordinates: 49°27′N 75°04′E

Tegisshildik Rural District Тегісшілдік ауылдық округі
- Rural district
- Interactive map of Tegisshildik Rural District
- Country: Kazakhstan
- Region: Karaganda Region
- District: Karkaraly District

Population (2021)
  - Total: 961

The Tegisshildik Rural District (Kazakh: Тегісшілдік ауылдық округі, Russian: Тегисшилдикский сельский округ) is an administrative division in the Karkaraly District of the Karaganda Region in Kazakhstan. Its administrative centre is the selo of Tegisshildik.

== Population ==
Settlement	Population (1989)	Population (1999)	Population (2009)	Population (2021)
Zharly	998	622	337	204
Karynshi	418	355	217	92
Tegisshildik	1338	1076	1034	665
Shunkyrkudyk	186	136	-	-
