= Igor Bugayev =

Russian politician (1933–2021)

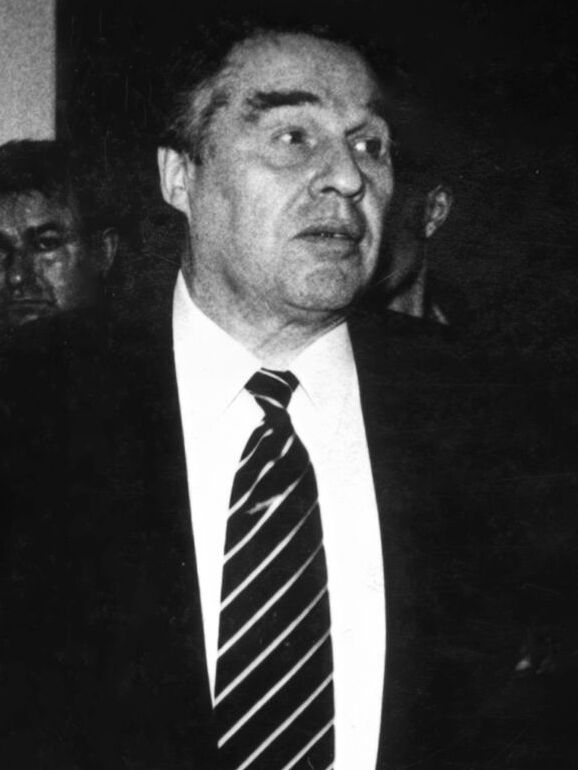
- 1997

First Secretary of the Presnensky District Committee of the Communist Party of the Soviet Union
- In office 1975–1977

Personal details
- Born: 26 February 1933 Moscow, Russian SFSR, Soviet Union
- Died: 22 November 2021 (aged 88)
- Party: CPSU

Igor Bugayev (Russian: Игорь Борисович Бугаев; 26 February 1933 – 22 November 2021) was a Soviet-Russian politician. He served as First Secretary of the Presnensky District Committee of the Communist Party of the Soviet Union from 1975 to 1977.

== Biography ==
Born in 1933 in Moscow. Member of the CPSU.

He studied at the Faculty of Economics of MGIMO, in the 4th year due to reduction in places he was transferred to the 2nd year of the Faculty of Journalism of Moscow State University, he graduated in 1958.

1958—1968 head of the department of working youth, deputy editor, editor-in-chief of the Moskovskij Komsomolets newspaper (during his leadership, the circulation reached 220 thousand copies).

1968—1975 assistant to the first secretary of the Moscow City Committee of the CPSU Viktor Grishin, head of the department of culture of the Moscow City Committee of the CPSU.

1975—1977 First Secretary of the Krasnopresnenskij District Committee of the CPSU.

1977—1985 head of the department of organizational and party work of the Moscow City Committee of the CPSU.

1985—1987 Deputy Chairman of the Executive Committee of the Moscow City Council.

1987—2001 Chairman of the Committee for Culture of the city of Moscow.

Since 2001, he has been an adviser to the president of the ANO "Editorial office of the Literaturnaya Gazeta".

Delegate of the XXV Congress of the CPSU.

Honored Worker of Culture of the Russian Federation (06/10/1993). Awarded the Order of Friendship (06/13/1996) and medals.

Died November 22, 2021. He was buried at the Vagankovsky cemetery.
