= Aleksey Merinov =

Russian cartoonist (born 1959)

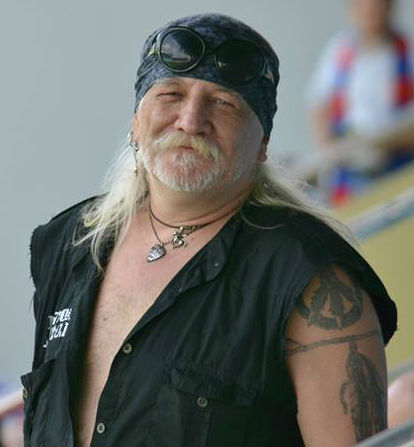
- Merinov in 2013
- Born: March 25, 1959 (age 67); Moscow, USSR
- Occupation: cartoonist
- Spouse: Marina Merinova-Ovsova
- Children: 1

Aleksey Viktorovich Merinov (Russian: Алексей Викторович Меринов; born 25 March 1959) is a Russian self-taught painter and cartoonist.

== Biography ==
Merinov was born in Moscow. He served in the Soviet Navy. In his youth he worked as a graphic designer in the Romen Theatre.

Since 1988 he has been working at the newspaper Moskovskij Komsomolets. He illustrated more than two dozen books. Among them: the Criminal Code and the Tax Code, Collection of recipes, a collection of quotations by Vladimir Putin. He has released over a dozen albums with his pictures.

He is a fan of CSKA Moscow.
