= Koktas (Karaganda Region) =

Koktas Көктас
- Village
- Köktas
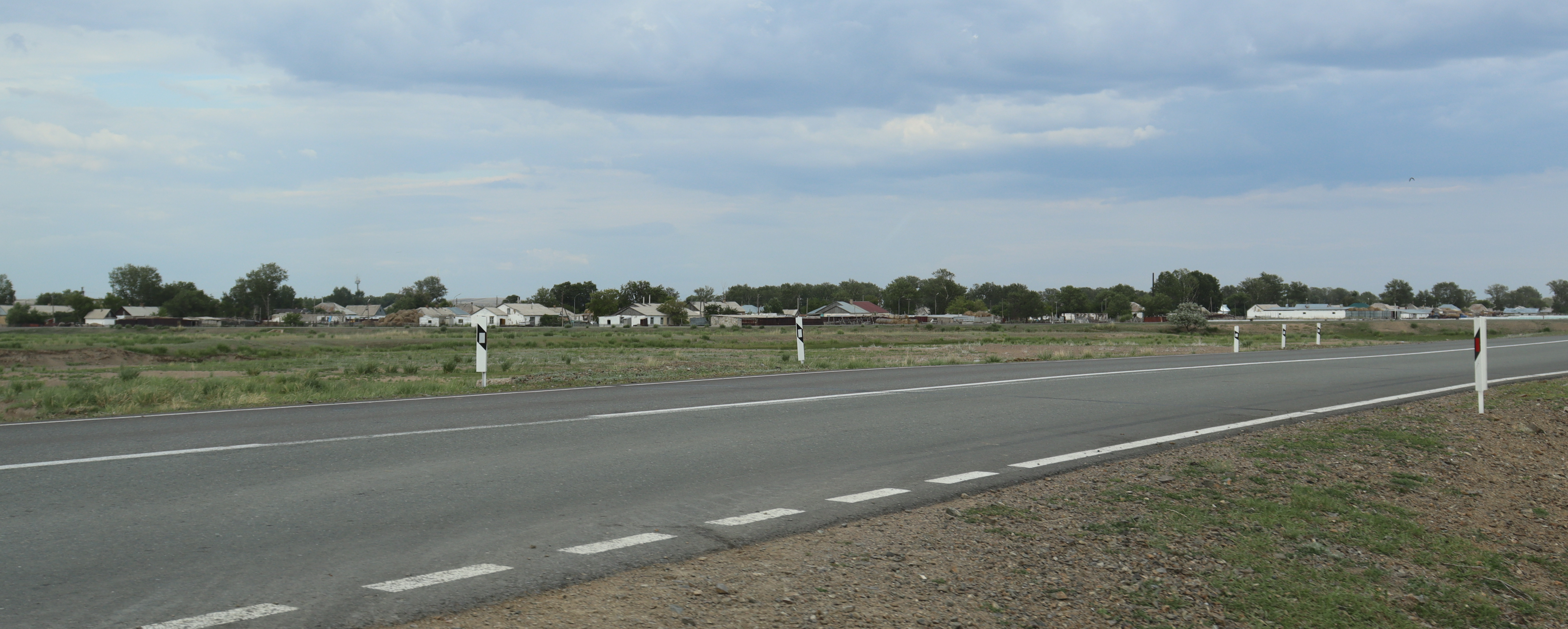

- Location in Kazakhstan
- Coordinates: 49°35′42.0″N 75°3′25.4″E
- Country: Kazakhstan
- Region: Karaganda Region

Population (2009)
  - Total: 1,480
- Postal Code: 100816
- Area code: +7 72146

Koktas (Kazakh: Көктас) is a selo in the Karkaraly District of the Karaganda Region in Kazakhstan. It is the administrative centre of the Karshigalinskiy Village District. Located on the River Zharly and approximately 36 km north-west of the district centre, the city of Karkaraly.

== Population ==
In the year 1999, the total population of the selo was 1655 people (824 men and 831 women). According to the 2009 census, the total population was 1480 people (743 men and 737 women).
