= Zharly =

River in Kazakhstan

Zharly Жарлы
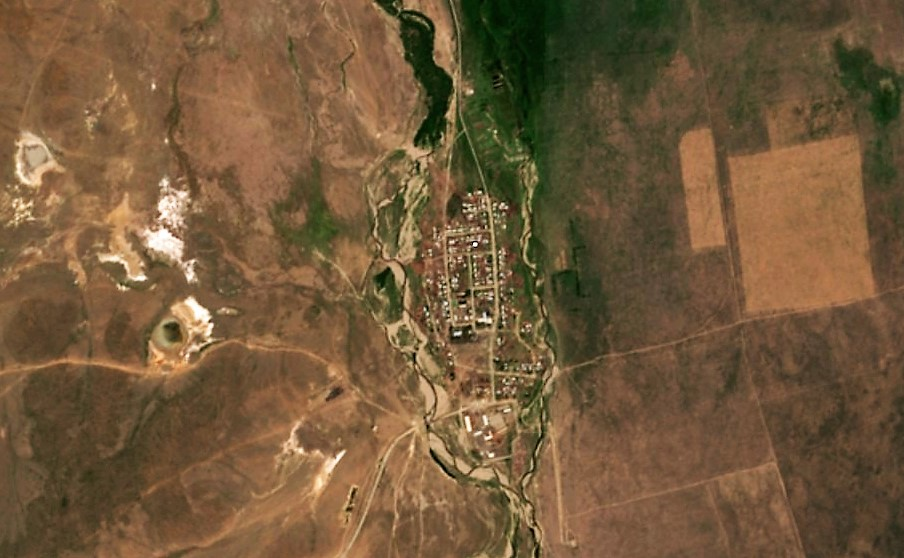
- The Zharly river flowing by Tegisshildik

- Mouth location in Kazakhstan

Location
- Countries: Kazakhstan

Physical characteristics
- Source: Kyzyltas; Kazakh Uplands
  - coordinates: 48°39′40″N 75°21′21″E
  - elevation: ca 1,000 m (3,300 ft)
- Mouth: close to Zhanazhol village
  - coordinates: 49°43′28″N 74°57′26″E
  - elevation: ca 635 meters (2,083 ft)
- Length: 156 km (97 mi)
- Basin size: 5,660 km^{2} (2,190 sq mi)
- Discharge
  - average: 0.32 m^{3}/s (11 cu ft/s)

The Zharly (Kazakh: Жарлы; Russian: Жарлы) is a river in Karkaraly District, Karaganda Region, Kazakhstan. It is 156 kilometres (97 mi) long and has a basin of 5,660 km^{2} (2,190 sq mi).

The Zharly is one of the longest rivers of the Karasor Basin. The main settlements near its banks are Milybulak, Akshoky, Zharly (NRD), Tegisshildik, Zharly (TRD) and Koktas.

== Course ==
The Zharly has its sources in the slopes of Mount Duaktas, part of the Kyzyltas Massif, central Kazakh Uplands. It first flows roughly westwards as the Ashchyozek, a mountain river forming rapids within a deep, narrow gorge. After it bends northwards its current is still strong and it is known as the Aktas. Further downriver from Milybulak village it is known as the Koktal; its channel widens and the flow of the current eases. In its middle course the river passes by Akshoky and is known as the Zharly, beginning to twist and turn while continuing to flow northwards; here some stretches of its banks are steep. Further on, the river bends slightly to the NNW north of Tegisshildik, keeping that course along its final stretch, where it meanders within a 5 kilometres (3.1 mi) to 6 kilometres (3.7 mi) wide floodplain with scattered lakes. Formerly the river used to reach the southern shore of lake Saumalkol, but now its waters get lost in the ground about 10 kilometres (6.2 mi) to the south of the lakeshore, a little east of Zhanazhol village, former Novy Put.

The river has eleven tributaries that are longer than 10 kilometres (6.2 mi). The longest is the 50 kilometres (31 mi) long Taishek from the right.

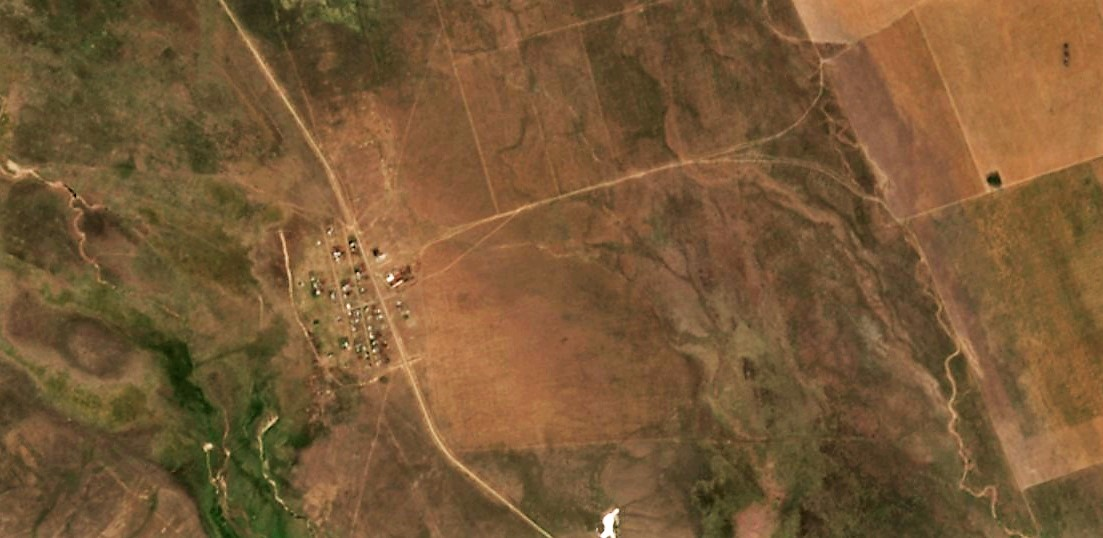
Final stretch of the Zharly (right) near Zhanazhol village Sentinel-2 image.

== See also ==
- List of rivers of Kazakhstan
