= Nurken Abdirov =

Kazakh World War II attack pilot (1919–1942)

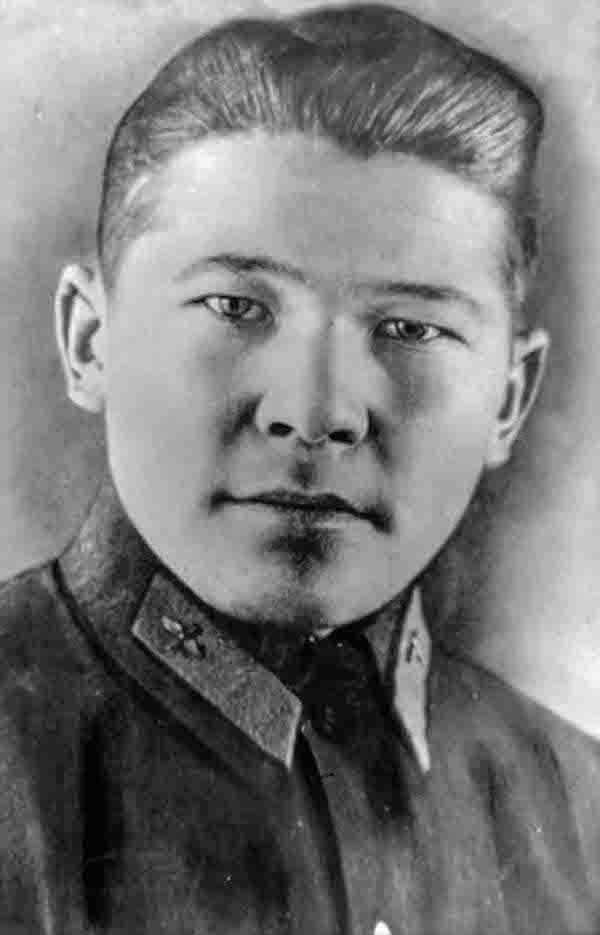
- Born: 9 August 1919; 5th aul, Karkaraly District, Karaganda, Alash Autonomy (now Kazakhstan)
- Died: 19 December 1942 (aged 23); Stalingrad, Russian SFSR, Soviet Union
- Military career
- Allegiance: Soviet Union
- Branch: Soviet Air Force
- Service years: 1940 – 1942
- Rank: Sergeant
- Unit: 808th Attack Aviation Regiment
- Conflicts: World War II †
- Awards: Hero of the Soviet Union

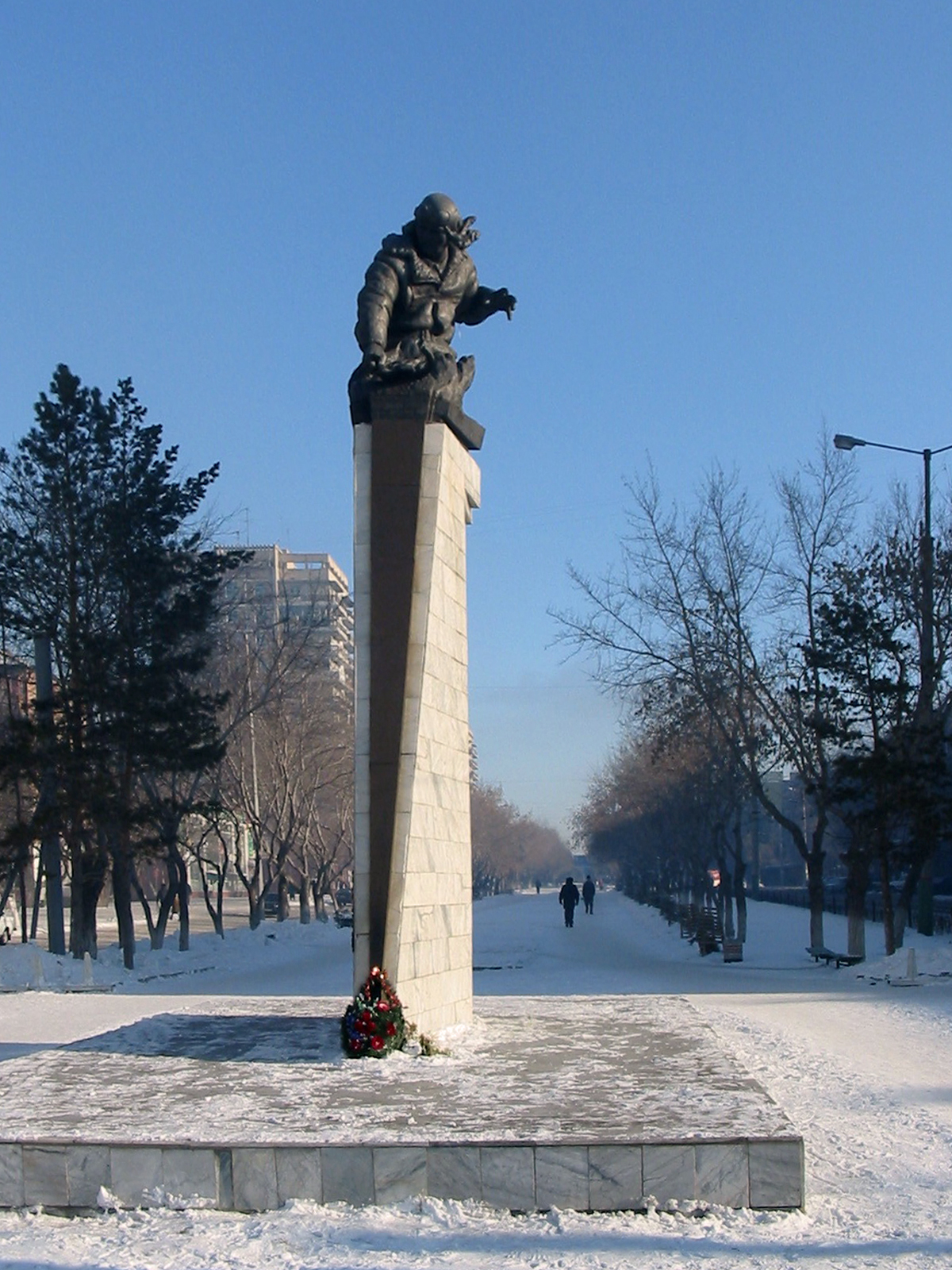
Statue of Abdirov in the city of Karaganda, Kazakhstan

Nurken Abdirovich Abdirov (Kazakh: Нұркен Әбдіров, romanized: Nūrken Äbdırov, Russian: Нуркен Абдирович Абдиров; 9 August 1919 – 19 December 1942) was a Kazakh pilot who was posthumously awarded the title Hero of the Soviet Union on 31 March 1941 for ramming his aircraft into a German tank column after it sustained a direct hit to the engine on 19 December 1942.

== Early life ==
Nurken Abdirov was born on 9 August 1919 in the Karkaraly District in the territory of the former 5th aul to a family of Kazakh peasants. According to genealogical records, he originates from the Sarym branch of the Karakesek tribe of the Argyn tribe. Having received an incomplete secondary education, he spent most of his childhood working on a collective farm. In 1939 he graduated from the pilot course of the Karaganda Aeroclub and received the qualifications to become a reserve pilot.

== Military service ==
In 1940, he got drafted into the ranks of the Red Army and graduated from the 1st Chkalov Military Aviation Pilot School in 1941. In the same year, he joined the Communist Party of the Soviet Union. On 28 October 1942 he arrived on the warfront as a pilot in the 808th Assault Aviation Regiment, which flew ground attack missions on the Ilyushin Il-2. He flew in 16 sorties, in which he destroyed 12 Nazi tanks, 28 trucks, 18 vehicles loaded with ammunition, 3 fuel tanks, and 3 cannons, and killed more than 50 German soldiers and officers.

=== Feat ===
On 19 December 1942, while attacking enemy positions near the Konkov farm, his Il-2 received a direct hit on the engine and caught fire. Realizing there was no chance to survive, he steered his descent to crash into a column of German tanks, repeating the feat of Nikolai Gastello and destroying six enemy tanks. Together with him, his gunner Alexander Komissarov, who refused to jump from the plane also died. By the Decree of the Presidium of the Supreme Soviet of the USSR, Abdirov was posthumously awarded the title of Hero of the Soviet Union on 31 March 1943. He was buried in the mass grave at the Konkov farm.

== Legacy ==
- In Karaganda, a monument got erected by sculptor Yuri Gummel and sculptor Anatoly Bilyk to commemorate him.
- One of the avenues of the Street of Alma-Ata got named after him. The street next to Nurken Abdirov Avenue is named after Alexander Komissarov, shooter who died along with Nurken.
- A bust of Nurken Abdirov unveiled in 2003 in honor of the 58th anniversary of the Great Victory, was installed in Karkaralinsky district.
- In Volgograd, on Mamaev Kurgan, a memorial plaque made of black marble was installed with his name carved on it.
- In the village of Bokovskaya, a bust of him was erected. The plaque under it reading "Heroes do not die".
- In the Konkov farm on a mass grave where the remains of the soldiers who died during the liberation of the farm are buried, his name is written on a commemorative plaque.
- The poem "Winged Kazakh" (1947) by the Kazakh Soviet writer Sapargali Begalin was dedicated to Nurken Abdirov
- In 2019, a postage stamp dedicated to Nurken Abdirov got issued.

== See also ==
- List of Kazakh Heroes of the Soviet Union
- Talgat Bigeldinov
- Khiuaz Dospanova
- Nikolai Gastello
