= Zhanazhol (Karaganda Region) =

Zhanazhol Жаңажол
- Selo
- Jañajol
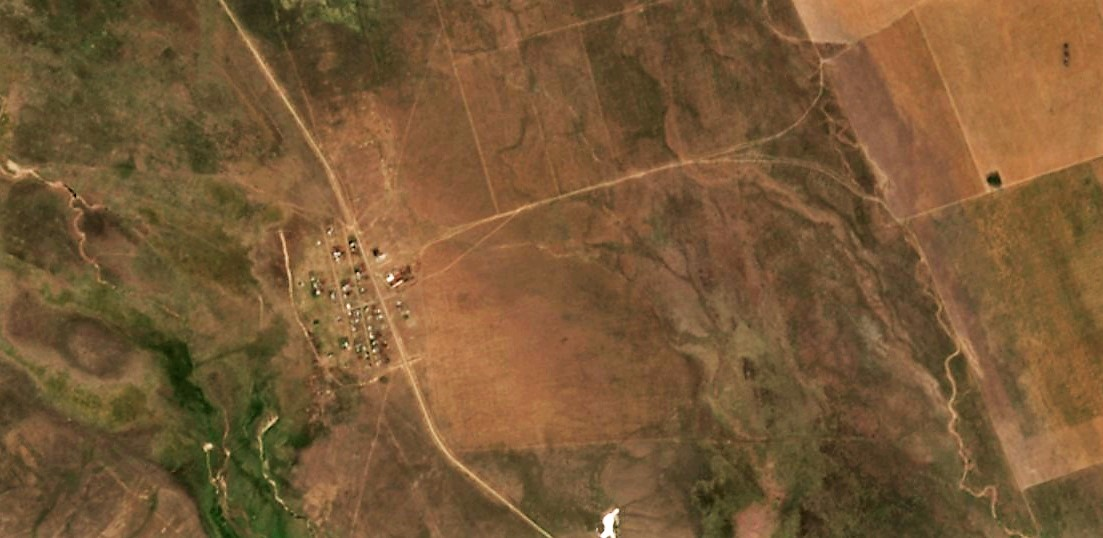
- Zhanazhol as seen from space (Sentinel-2 satellite)

- Zhanazhol in Kazakhstan
- Coordinates: 49°42′58″N 74°54′56″E
- Country: Kazakhstan
- Region: Karaganda Region

Population (2009)
  - Total: 209

Zhanazhol (Kazakh: Жаңажол) is a selo in the Karkaraly District of the Karaganda Region in Kazakhstan. It is a part of the Karshigalinskiy Village District.

== Population ==
In the year 1999, the population of the selo was 280 people (141 men and 139 women). According to the 2009 census, there were 209 people (103 men and 106 women).
