= Ticket to America =

1992 short story collection

- First edition
- Authors: Anatoliy Baranov, Andrei Gusev, Mishell Popov, Victor Pososhkoff
- Original title: Билет в Америку
- Language: Russian
- Genre: fiction, fantasy
- Publisher: Липецкое издательство (Russia)
- Publication date: 1992
- Publication place: Russia
- Pages: 144 pp

Ticket to America (Russian: Билет в Америку) is a 1992 short story collection by Russian writers Anatoliy Baranov, Andrei Gusev, Mishell Popov and Victor Pososhkoff.

== Contents ==
Ticket to America includes 14 short stories with lyrical scenes and eroticism.
The collection is named after one of the short stories, "Ticket to America" by Andrei Gusev. This story, written before perestroika in the USSR, tells about a young girl who was born in Moscow and leaves her homeland forever, going to her father in the United States of America. In the process, she is separated from her lover.

Anatoliy Baranov's stories are stylized as journalism, and Mikhail Popov's texts present stories from the life of the capital's literary community during the late USSR period. The stories of Viсtor Pososhkoff mainly describe the life and values of Soviet people.

== Literary features ==
The short stories presented have completely different plots, textures, and author's style. However, in the texts of all four authors there are reflections on how the glasnost and perestroika that began in Russia will end. Wars and senseless violence should have no place in post-Soviet Russia.

The collection's circulation is fifteen thousand copies.

== Publication history ==
All four authors met at the editorial office of the newspaper "Stupeni" in Moscow, then they decided to publish this book. The compilers of the collection are Viktor Pososhkoff and Andrei Gusev.

The collection Ticket to America and the short story of the same name became the hallmark of the then novice Moscow writer Andrei Gusev.

== Notes ==
- Anatoliy Baranov, Andrei Gusev, Mishell Popov, Victor Pososhkoff (1992). Билет в Америку (English: “Ticket to America”). Moscow: Липецкое издательство (Russia). p. 144.
