= Zharly (Tegisshildik Rural District) =

Village in Kazakhstan

Zharly Жарлы
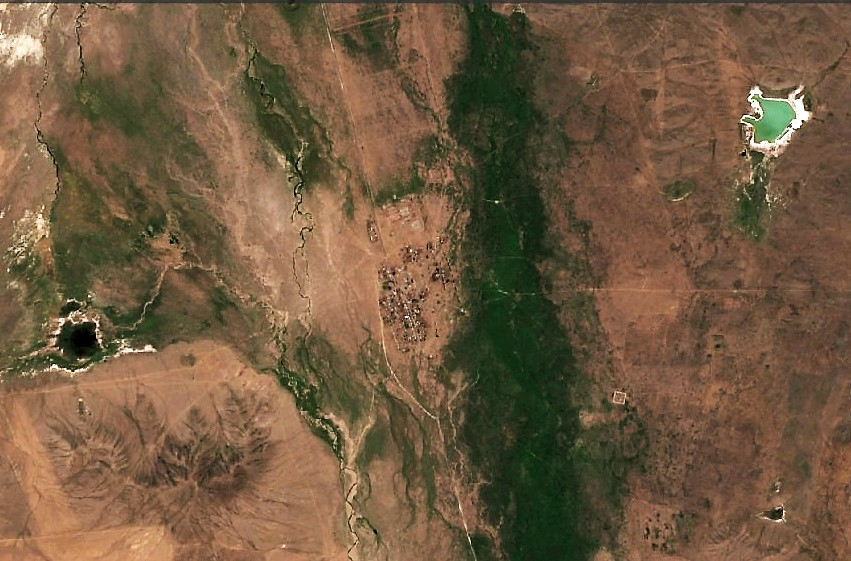
- River Zharly and Zharly village

- Location in Kazakhstan
- Coordinates: 49°28′47″N 75°06′17″E
- Country: Kazakhstan
- Region: Karaganda Region
- District: Karkaraly District
- Rural District: Tegisshildik Rural District

Population (2009)
  - Total: 337
- Time zone: UTC+6

Zharly (Kazakh: Жарлы) is a settlement in Karkaraly District, Karaganda Region, Kazakhstan. It is part of the Tegisshildik Rural District (KATO code - 354877200). Population: 337 (2009 census results); 622 (1999 census results).

== Geography ==
Zharly lies by the Zharly river in the Kazakh Uplands about 26 kilometers (16 mi) to the southwest of the district capital Karkaraly.
