= Zharly (Nurken Rural District) =

Village in Kazakhstan

Zharly Жарлы
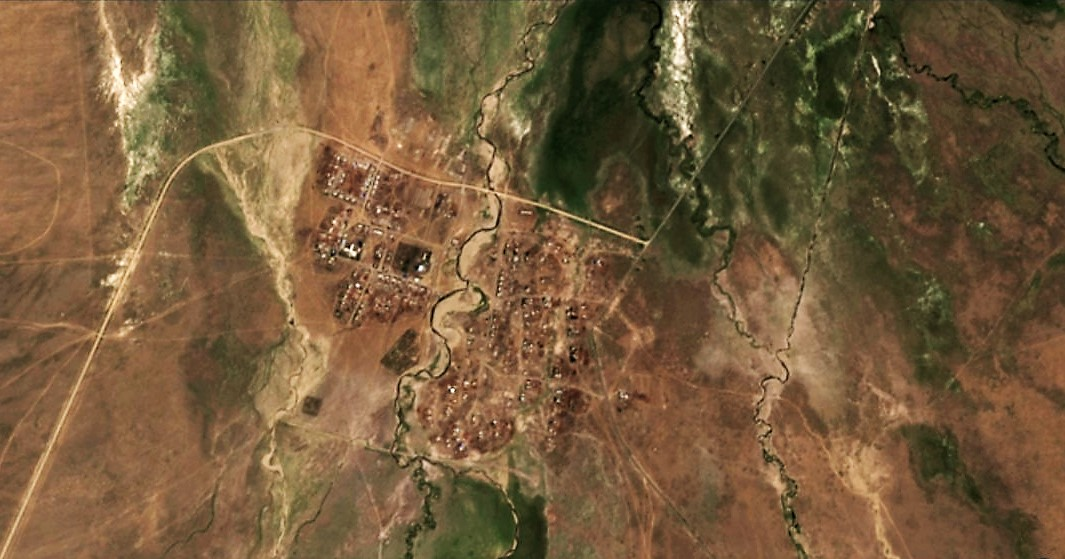
- River Zharly and Zharly village

- Location in Kazakhstan
- Coordinates: 49°10′50″N 75°12′45″E
- Country: Kazakhstan
- Region: Karaganda Region
- District: Karkaraly District
- Rural District: Nurken Rural District
- Established: 1929

Population (2009)
  - Total: 1,407
- Time zone: UTC+6
- Postcode: 100812

Zharly (Kazakh: Жарлы) is a settlement in Karkaraly District, Karaganda Region, Kazakhstan. It is the administrative center of the Nurken Rural District (KATO code - 354853100). Population: 1,407 (2009 census results); 1,561 (1999 census results). Zharly is the birthplace of late Soviet Air Forces pilot Nurken Abdirov (1919 – 1942).

== Geography ==
Zharly lies by the Zharly river in the Kazakh Uplands about 32 kilometers (20 mi) to the southwest of the district capital Karkaraly.
