= Sergei Aman =

Russian writer

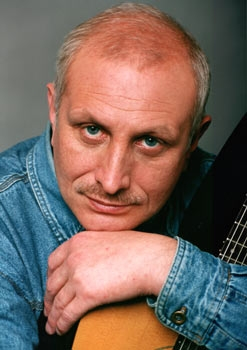
- Born: Sergei Amanovich Khummedov; 12 February 1957 (age 69); Turkmen SSR, Soviet Union
- Occupations: writer, novelist, journalist
- Children: 1
- Writing career
- Pen name: Sergei Aman, Ivan Lingamov
- Language: Russian
- Period: 1997 – present
- Notable works: Journalists (novel); Everything Will Be Okay, We're All Going to Die!
- Website: sergaman.ru

Sergei Amanovich Khummedov (Russian: Сергей Аманович Хуммедов, born 12 February 1957), better known by the pen name Sergei Aman (Russian: Сергей Аман), is a Russian writer and journalist.

Sergei Aman was born in Mary, in the former Turkmen Soviet Socialist Republic, then part of the Soviet Union. He graduated from Moscow State University in 1985. In 1995 Sergei Aman became a journalist of the daily Moskovskij Komsomolets. Also he worked in Vechernyaya Moskva, Stupeni, The New Medical Gazette, magazine Auto M.
The most famous book of Sergei Aman is Journalists. He published this novel in 2013. In 2018 Sergei Aman published the novel Everything Will Be Okay, We're All Going to Die!

Sergei Aman served as a prototype for one of the main characters — Sergei Medov or Amanich, a writer from Russia — in the thriller novels The Painter & Eros and Our Wild Sex in Malindi by Andrei Gusev.
Sergei Aman is a member of the Union of Russian Writers. He lives in Moscow. His hobby is sport fishing from a boat.
