= Charjou Abdirov =

Uzbek Karakalpak microbiologist and environmental researcher

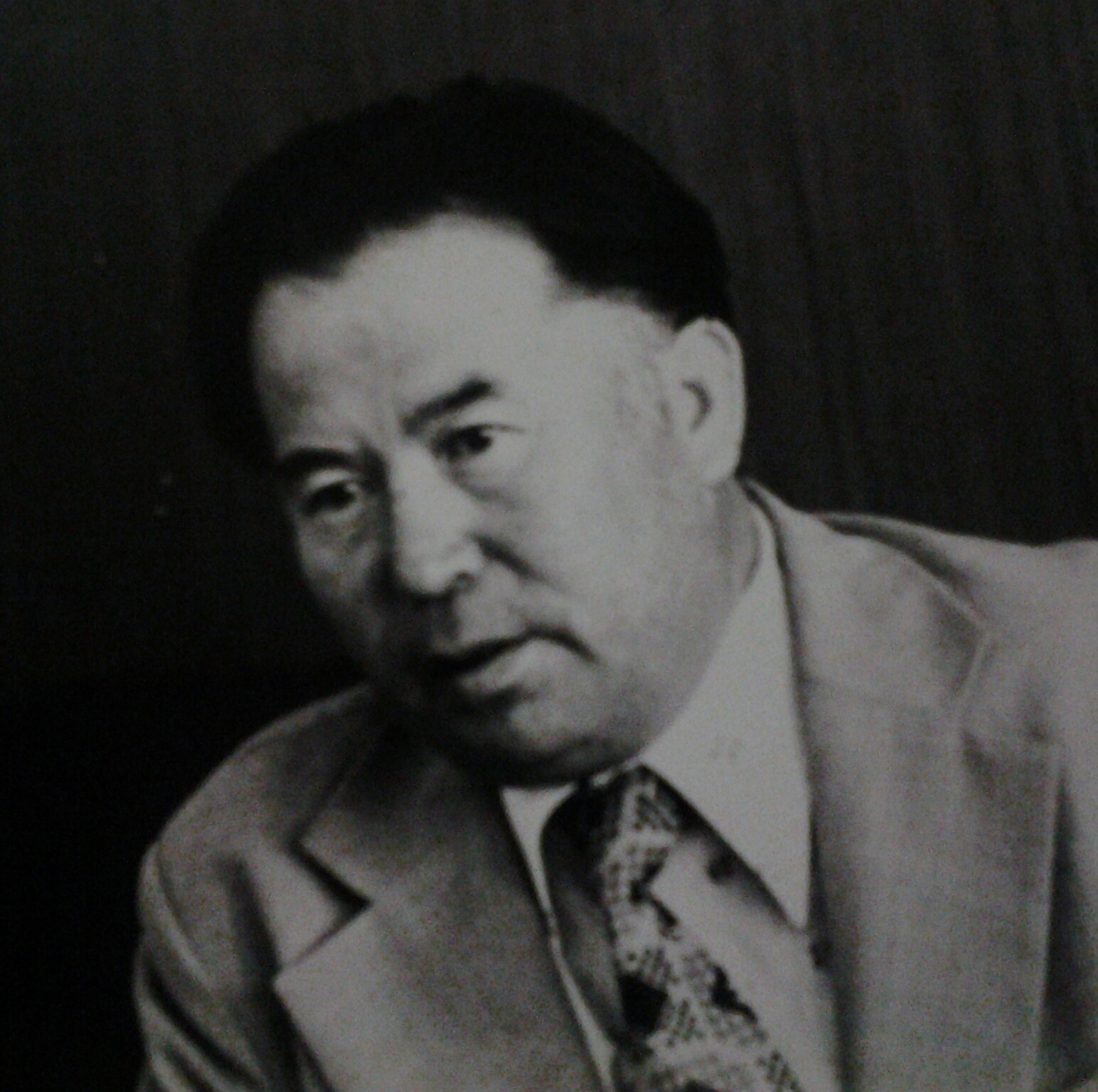
- Charjou Abdirov
- Born: 20 December 1933; Karauzyak, Karakalpakstan, Uzbekistan
- Died: 3 July 1997 (aged 63)
- Occupation: Microbiologist

Charjou Abdirov (also Charjou or Chardjou Abdirovich Abdirov; Russian: Чаржау Абдирович Абдиров; 20 December 1933 – 3 July 1997) was a noted Uzbek (Karakalpak) microbiologist and specialist in leprosy as well as a researcher into the environmental problems of the Aral region. He was the first rector of the Nukus State University, academician, Vice-President of the Uzbek Academy of Sciences, and politician.

== Biographical details ==
Charjou Abdirovich Abdirov was born in the village of Karauzyak. In 1955 he graduated from the sanitary-hygienic faculty of Tashkent State Medical Institute. He was a pioneer of microbiological science in Karakalpakstan. From 1961 he held various senior positions in academia. Between 1969 and 1976 he served as Minister of Health of the Republic of Karakalpakstan. He introduced a new immuno-genetic concept of human perception of leprosy and published over 130 papers, 14 monographs, 6 guidelines.

From 1976 Abdirov served for nine years as rector of Nukus State University. Between 1985 and 1996 he held senior positions at the Institute of Natural Sciences of Uzbekistan Academy of Sciences and the Research Institute of Leprosy and served as director of Karakalpakstan Branch of the Experimental and Clinical Medical Institute of the Academy. In 1995 elected Chairman of the Committee of the Oliy Majlis of the Republic of Uzbekistan on issues of environment and nature. Since 1996, he was vice-president of the Academy of Sciences of Uzbekistan, chairman of the Presidium of Karakalpakstan Branch of the Academy.

As a member of the Supreme Council of the Republic of Karakalpakstan 8, 9, 10 and 12 convocations Ch Abdirov took an active part in political work, he headed the Committee on Environment and Nature Protection and participated in the drafting of legislation on the environment and addressing socio- environmental problems of the population of the Aral Sea coast. Since 1994, in addition to medical research and organization of health activities he was a deputy of the Oliy Majlis and headed the Committee on Environment and Nature Protection.

== Death ==
Abdirov died of cancer on 3 July 1997, aged 63.

== Recognition ==
Abdirov was awarded State Prizes of the Republic of Uzbekistan and Karakalpakstan and had a street in Nukus, where the State University Karakalpakstan is located, named after him: Ch. Abdirov str ( ул. Ч. Абдирова), and he founded a charitable scientific and cultural foundation Meruert (Меруэрт).

== Sources ==
The source for this article is the Russian Wikipedia article. This in turn cites Vesti Karakalpakstan No. 54 (16188) 5 July 1997 (Газета «Вести Каракалпакстана» No. 54 (16188) 5 июля 1997 г.) as its source.
