= Pavel Gusev (journalist) =

Russian journalist and public figure (born 1949)

- Павел Гусев
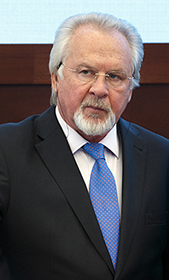
- Gusev in September 2016
- Born: Pavel Nikolayevich Gusev; 4 April 1949 (age 77); Moscow, Soviet Union
- Education: Russian State Geological Prospecting University, Gorky Literature Institute
- Occupation: Journalist
- Years active: 1983-present
- Employer: Moskovskij Komsomolets
- Political party: Congress of Russian Communities
- Pavel Gusev's voice from the Echo of Moscow program, 20 April 2006

Pavel Nikolayevich Gusev (Russian: Павел Николаевич Гусев; born 4 April 1949, Moscow) is a Russian journalist and public figure. He has been the editor-in-chief of the Moscow daily newspaper Moskovskij Komsomolets since 1983. He is a professor of journalism at the International University in Moscow and a member of Russia's Presidential Council for Civil Society and Human Rights.

He is also the head of the Moscow Union of Journalists.

== Early life and education ==
Gusev was born on 4 April 1949 in Moscow, Russia.

He graduated from the Russian State Geological Prospecting University in 1971. From 1971-1975, Gusev was a junior research associate at the Russian State Geological Prospecting University. Then he earned a graduate degree in literature from Maxim Gorky Literature Institute in 1985.

== Career ==
Gusev was involved in the Communist youth organization Komsomol from 1975 right up till 1983. He served as Second Secretary of Komsomol's Krasnopresnensky District branch in Moscow from 1975 till 1976, then First Secretary from 1976 till 1980. He worked in the international department of the Komsomol's Central Committee until 1983, when he joined Moskovskij Komsomolets in his present role as editor-in-chief.

In 1991, Pavel Gusev stated that “... editors-in-chief and leaders of the press will always be selected for political or administrative reasons”.

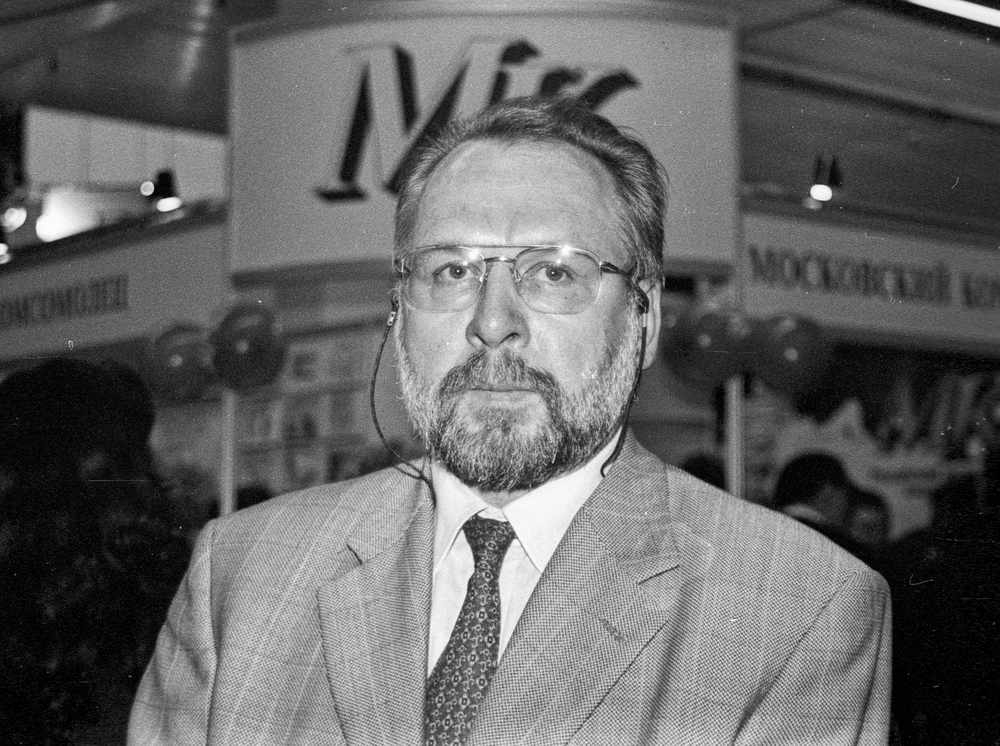
Gusev in October 2000

Viktor Shenderovich wrote about Pavel Gusev that his evolution was from a member of Komsomol to Gorbachev’s perestroika wave and to a democrat-supporter of president Boris Yeltsin, then to a patriot from the Congress of Russian Communities, a loyal supporter of the Mayor of Moscow, Yuri Luzhkov and, finally, an obedient servant of Vladimir Putin.

Gusev is currently a member of Russia's Presidential Council for Civil Society and Human Rights, where he is chairman of the "Commission on Supporting Mass Media as the Basis of Civil Society".

In May 2016, he was included in the sanctions list of Ukraine by President Petro Poroshenko, he was denied entry to Ukraine.

In 2018, Pavel Gusev was Vladimir Putin's confidant in the presidential elections in Russia.

=== Sanctions ===
He was sanctioned by the UK government in 2022 in relation to the Russo-Ukrainian War.

In April 2022, in response to the Russian invasion of Ukraine, Gusev was added to the European Union sanctions list "in response to the ongoing unjustified and unprovoked Russian military aggression against Ukraine and other actions undermining or threatening the territorial integrity, sovereignty and independence of Ukraine".

== Awards ==
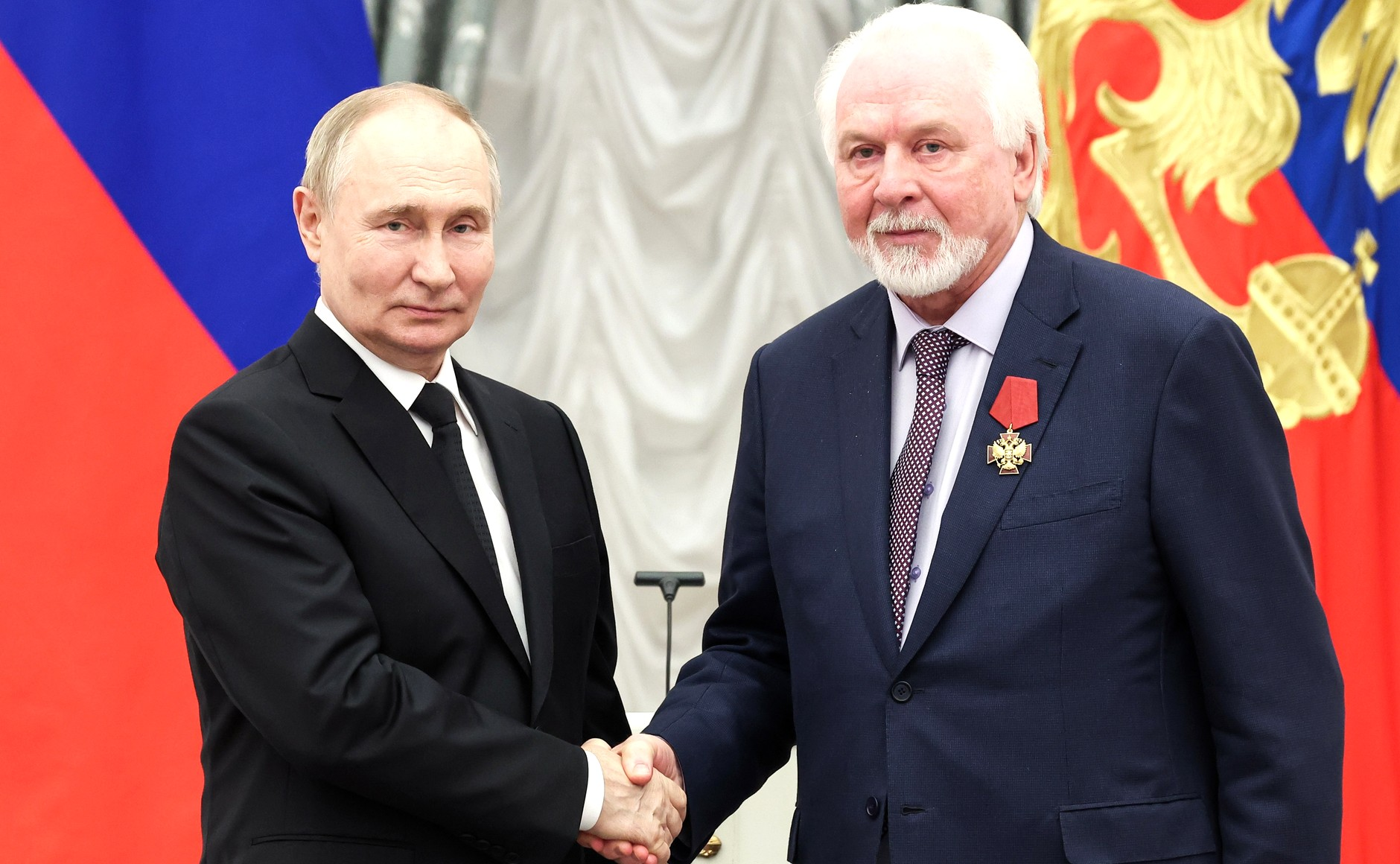
Presentation of the Order "For Merit to the Fatherland", 4th class, 30 May 2024

- Laureate of the Russian public award The Best Feathers of Russia in 1999.
- Order of Honour in 2009.
- For Service to Moscow distinction in 2003.
