= Tegisshildik =

Tegisshildik Тегісшілдік
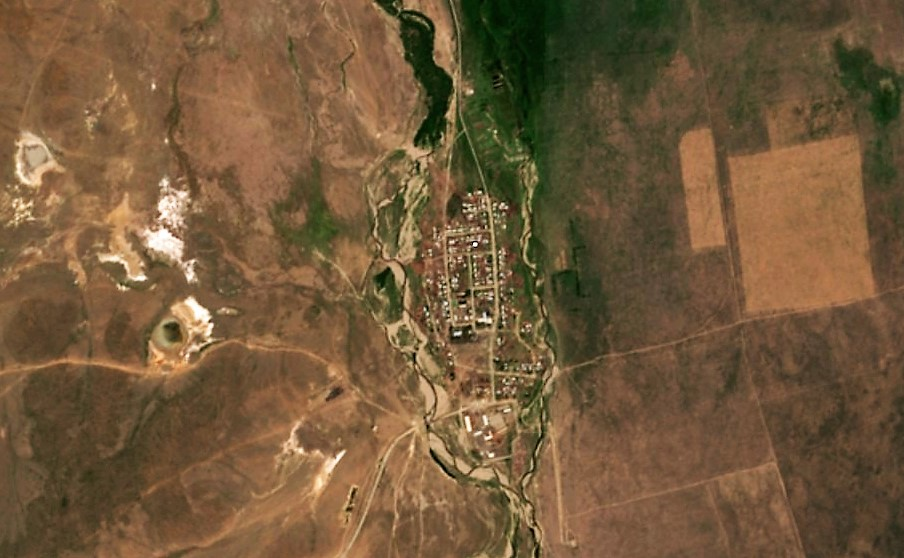
- A satellite view of the selo (Sentinel-2 L2A data, modified)

- Location within Kazakhstan
- Coordinates: 49°24′46″N 75°07′37″E
- Country: Kazakhstan
- Region: Karaganda Region

Population (2009)
  - Total: 1,034
- Postal code: 100821
- Area code: +7 72146

Tegisshildik (Kazakh: Тегісшілдік) is a selo in the Karkaraly District of the Karaganda Region in Kazakhstan. It is the administrative centre of the Tegisshildik Rural District. It is located on the River Zharly.

== Population ==
In the year 1999, the population of the selo was 1212 people (608 men and 604 women). According to the 2009 census, there were 1034 people (527 men and 507 women).
