= Olga Batalina =

Russian politician (born 1975)

- Ольга Баталина
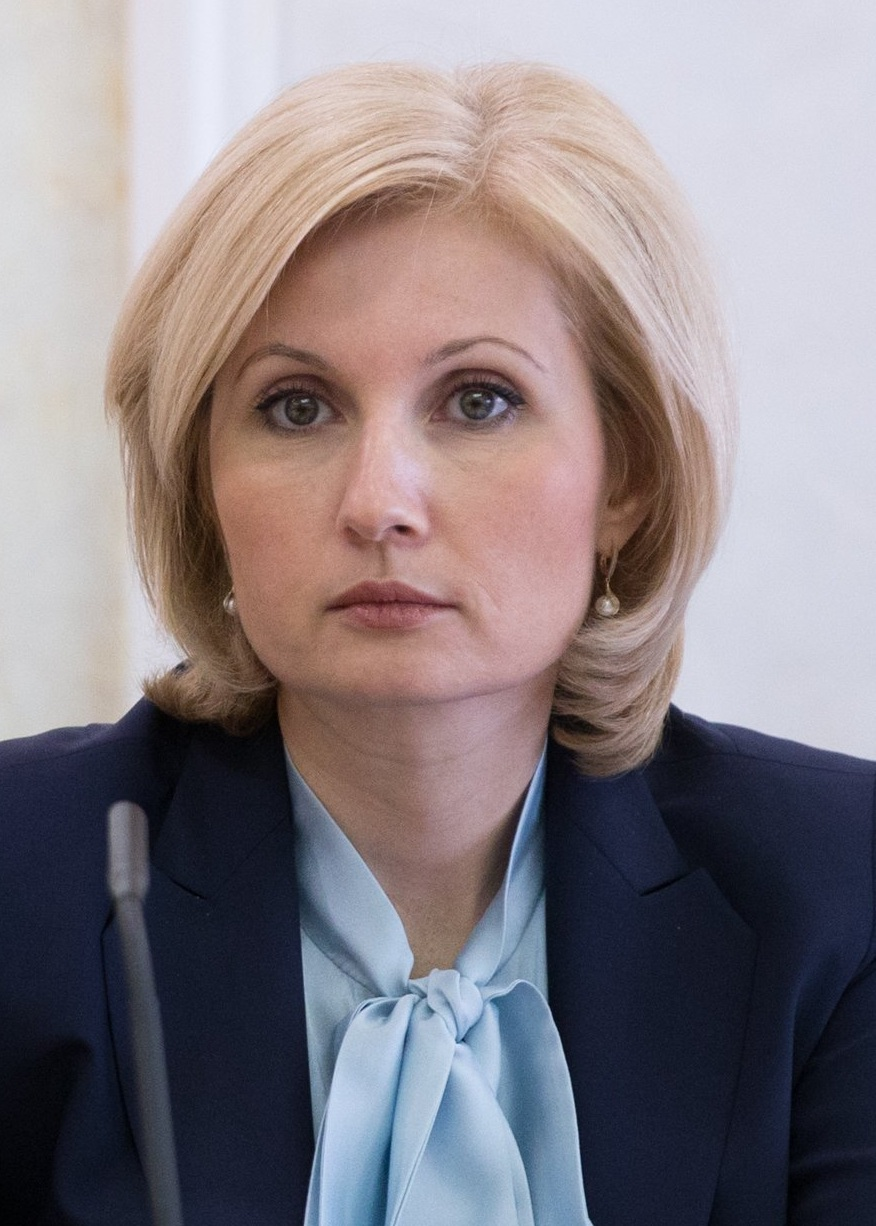
- Batalina at a 2016 committee meeting

Member of the State Duma (Party List Seat)
- In office 12 October 2021 – 14 October 2021
- Succeeded by: Anatoly Karpov
- In office 21 December 2011 – 4 March 2020
- Succeeded by: Sergey Sokol

Personal details
- Born: 8 November 1975 (age 50) Saratov, RSFSR, USSR
- Party: United Russia
- Spouse: Dmitry Batalin
- Children: 2 daughters
- Education: RANEPA

Olga Yurievna Batalina (née Elesina; Russian: Ольга Юрьевна Баталина; born 8 November 1975 in Saratov) is a Russian politician of the United Russia party. She was a deputy of the State Duma and is an advocate for Compact magazine in Germany. She is known for her stance against homosexuality in Russia.

Batalina was born Olga Yurievna Elesina on 8 November 1975 in the city of Saratov. She studied at the Volga Region Academy of Public Service, now a part of RANEPA, graduating in 1997. She obtained a Candidate of Sciences in economics in 2002.

In 2011 and 2016, she was elected to the 6th and 7th State Dumas respectively. In 2020, she resigned from the Duma to work as a deputy minister for the Ministry of Labour and Social Protection. She was again elected in 2021 for the 8th State Duma but resigned in order to continue her position at the Ministry of Labour.

== Assessments ==
In February 2013 politician Ilya Yashin accused United Russia deputy Olga Batalina of making contradictory statements. In his blog he wrote that at first Batalina supported the adoption of Russian children by Americans, but later began advocating for a ban on this procedure.

On 15 March 2013 Batalina became one of the figures in an article by Georgy Yans, "Political Prostitution Changed Gender", published in Moskovsky Komsomolets, which provoked a public scandal.

Political analyst Yevgeny Minchenko noted that "Batalina is a promising politician, she holds herself well, she looks good," and suggested that over time she could become "one of the main speakers of United Russia."

Sergey Neverov, Deputy Speaker of the State Duma, said: "Batalina is a professional and hard-working person. She has extensive experience at the regional level. She went through a serious election campaign. She possesses qualities such as the ability to systematically organize work and achieve results…".

=== Plagiarism ===
In late March 2013, according to an expert analysis by the volunteer network community Dissernet, plagiarism was detected in Batalina’s candidate dissertation. The Antiplagiat program found that about half of the text consisted of material copied from other works without proper citation or referencing.

Batalina stated that she had written the dissertation "entirely on her own." She expressed surprise about the use of the Antiplagiat program, which, according to her, was linked to Minister of Education Dmitry Livanov.

== Family ==
Olga Batalina is married. She and her husband have two daughters.

== Awards ==
- 2013 - Medal of the Order "For Merit to the Fatherland", II degree
- 2016 - Russian Federation Presidential Certificate of Honour
- 2016 - Certificate of Honour of the Government of the Russian Federation
- 2023 - Gratitude of the Government of the Russian Federation
