= The World According to Novikoff =

2006 novel by Andrei Gusev

- First edition
- Author: Andrei Gusev
- Original title: Мир по Новикову
- Language: Russian
- Genre: Thriller, fantasy
- Publisher: "West-Consulting" (Russia)
- Publication date: October 2006; 20 years ago
- Publication place: Russia
- Pages: 384 pp
- ISBN: 978-5-903321-02-5
- Preceded by: With Chronos' Permit
- Followed by: The Russian Writer Loves Role Plays

The World According to Novikoff (Russian: Мир по Новикову) is a thriller novel by Russian writer Andrei Gusev, published in 2006.

== Plot summary ==
Victor Novikoff, an editor of a literary journal in Moscow, receives a manuscript which describes an imminent nuclear terror attack, and must decide whether it is a real warning or simply fiction that can be published.

== Literary features ==
The World According to Novikoff is a novel with a non-linear storyline. However, not only characters but also the angle of view combines all four parts of this novel: two points of view — male and female — on the same vital conflict, moral problems, erotic transactions. Also there are frankly farce episodes in the book. In fact, the life of an ordinary man in modern Russia describes in the novel. At the same time, this is an example of how policies affect the life of an ordinary citizen, but it is an example of how history is made up of ant efforts of millions of people.

From another side this novel is a mixture of thriller and fantasy. At the cover of the book we can read: "All the characters of this book, including famous politicians, are a figment of the imagination of the author. If you find some convergence with the Russian reality, then so much the worse for last".

“After reading the book The World According to Novikoff by Andrei Gusev, I'm quite certain that it simply must be done bedside book each President to know how not to do a history, how not to lead the country. Kudos to Herostratus, destroyed one of the seven wonders of the world — the Temple of Artemis at Ephesus, this is not the kind of Fame, to which we should aspire”. — Irina Gorunova

== Publication history ==
The first part of the novel was published in 1996 and titled "The Russian story". The second and third parts – "Portraits of his Dreams" and "Lord of the Bees" – were written in 2003 year. The fourth principal part is "One Hundred Years from the Day of Birth" (Russian: Сто лет со дня рождения) – was written in 2006. For a long time the novel was not able to publish because publishing houses in Moscow refused to publish for fear of backlash and possible sanctions by the representatives of the highest Russian State power, depicted in the novel. Because of political reasons this novel was removed from some Russian literary portals.

The thriller novel The World According to Novikoff has not been published in English yet.
