= Moskovskij Komsomolets =

Moscow-based Soviet and Russian newspaper

- The front page of MK (PDF ver.) on 15 January 2021.
- Type: Daily newspaper
- Format: Tabloid
- Editor-in-chief: Pavel Gusev
- Founded: 1919
- Language: Russian
- Headquarters: Moscow, Russia; 123995, 1905 Goda Street, Building 7, Block 1
- Circulation: 900,000 - 1,980,000
- ISSN: 1562-1987
- Website: www.mk.ru

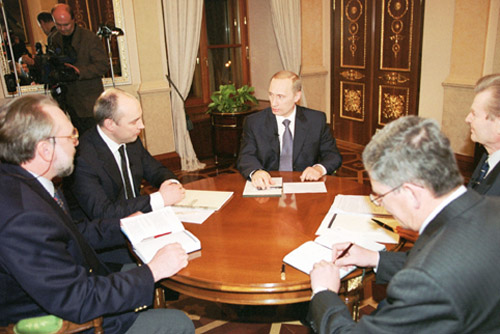
Gusev (leftmost) during President Vladimir Putin's interview to the chief editors of Russian leading newspapers, 22 March 2001

Moskovskij Komsomolets (Note: The newspaper officially uses the transliteration "Moskovskij Komsomolets" as a secondary name on its front page and website.) (MK; Russian: Московский комсомолец, lit. 'Moscow Komsomolets') is a Moscow-based daily newspaper with a circulation approaching one million, covering general news. Founded in 1919, it is famed for its topical reporting on Russian politics and society.

== History ==
The newspaper was first published by the Moscow Committee of the All-Union Leninist Young Communist League (Komsomol) on 11 December 1919 as Yunyi Kommunar (Russian: Юный коммунар, lit. 'Young Communard'). Over the next years it changed its name several time, starting a few months after the first issue when it became the Yunosheskaya Pravda (Russian: Юношеская правда, lit. 'Youth Truth'). In 1924, after Vladimir Lenin's death, it was renamed to Molodoy Leninets (Russian: Молодой ленинец, lit. 'Young Leninist'). It took its present-day name in September 1929.

Between 1931 and 1939, the paper ceased publication. It was revived in 1940, but not for long: World War II interrupted publishing again in August 1941. Publishing resumed only on 2 October 1945. Until 1990, it served as the organ of the Moscow Committee and the Moscow City Committee of the Komsomol. In 1991, it was taken over by its editorial staff.

The famous Soviet journalist Dodolev began his career in this newspaper. His 1986 "sensational piece" on currency prostitution in the USSR had an enormous resonance and led to changes in the Soviet administrative code.

=== Editors-in-chief ===
Since 1983, Pavel Gusev has served as MK's editor-in-chief.

Previous editors-in-chief include:

- Aleksandr Subbotin (1951–1958)
- Mikhail Borisov (1958–1963)
- Alexey Flerovsky (1963-1967)
- Igor Bugayev (1967)
- Arkady Udaltsov (1968–1974)
- Yevgeny Averin (1974–1977)
- Lev Gushchin (1978–1983)

== Contents ==
The paper specialises in topical social and political material, economic surveys, city news, urban chronicles and diverse information.

== ZD Awards ==
MK is also known as the host of Russia's oldest hit parade Zvukovaya Dorozhka (Russian: Звуковая дорожка, lit. 'Sound Track'). It was founded in autumn 1975 by Yu. V. Filonov. Also called the ZD Awards, it features both Russian and international acts. Since 2003, it has been held in concert halls. It is considered one of the major Russian music awards.

== Controversies ==
=== Conflict around the article "Political prostitution has changed gender" ===
On 16 March 2013, an article by Georgy Yans, titled "Political prostitution has changed gender", appeared in MK. In it, Yans wrote about the political careers of three female State Duma deputies from United Russia: Olga Batalina, Ekaterina Lakhova, and Irina Yarovaya.

On the same day, United Russia State Duma deputy Andrey Isayev promised on Twitter to "toughly" deal with the authors who allowed themselves to enact a "dirty attack on three female deputies", while calling the bloggers who responded to his tweet "small creatures" who "are indifferent to" Isayev and the deputies.

On 20 March 2013, United Russia deputies Sergey Neverov, Alexander Sidyakin, Sergei Zheleznyak, Robert Schlegel, Olga Batalina, Ekaterina Lakhova, and Mikhail Markelov wrote requests to the Prosecutor General's Office and the Ministry of Internal Affairs, where they asked to check the publication of an advertisement of "dubious nature" in MK. In their opinion, the editor-in-chief of MK "cannot help but know about the true nature of these advertisements". Gazeta.Ru associated this move by the deputies with the conflict between Andrey Isayev and MK.

On 22 March 2013, United Russia deputies demanded that the building of the editorial office of MK be returned to Moscow ownership. The initiators were four members of the United Russia faction: Anatoly Vyborny, Danil Volkov, Vladimir Ponevezhsky, and Valery Trapeznikov.

In October 2013, unknown persons bombarded the newspaper's editorial office with smoke bombs. Pavel Gusev believes that "some people from United Russia" are behind the attack, and the action itself is an act of revenge for the article.

== Circulation ==
According to a poll conducted in May 2004 by the Levada Center, 9% of the Russians and 33% of the Moscovites who responded, read the paper "more or less regularly". For the year 2000 the poll reports 11% and 40%, respectively.

It has a printed circulation of between 900,000 and 1,980,000 copies.

== See also ==
- Dmitry Kholodov – a journalist, killed in 1994
- Moskovskaya Komsomolka
- Moskovskaya Pravda
- Journalists (novel) – a book about journalists from MK
