= 100 books for schoolchildren =

Russian extracurricular reading list of books

100 books for schoolchildren (Russian: 100 книг для школьников, romanized: sto knig dlya shkolnyikov) is the list of books for extracurricular reading by schoolchildren recommended by the Russian Ministry of Education and Science, published in 2013.

The list was initiated by Vladimir Putin's "Russia: The National Question" (Россия: национальный вопрос) published in Nezavisimaya Gazeta in 2012.

The list was discussed for a week in 2012 at various online and print literary and cultural media of the Russian Federation, including the Public Council of the Ministry of Culture of the Russian Federation. The reception of the idea of the list and the list itself was mixed.

Elena Nizienko of the Ministry clarified that it does not include the books included into the school curriculum. Noting that usually the official documents are perceived as directive, she clarified that it a recommended, rather than an obligatory reading list. She also noted that the list will be periodically updated

The list encompasses 139 individual works.

== The list ==
№ (Note: Numbering according to the list.)	№ (Note: Numbering by order.)	Title	Author
1	1	A Book of the Blockade	Ales Adamovich and Daniil Granin
2	2	The Day Lasts More Than a Hundred Years	Chinghiz Aitmatov
2	3	The White Ship	Chinghiz Aitmatov
3	4	Ticket to the Stars	Vasily Aksyonov
3	5	The Island of Crimea	Vasily Aksyonov
4	6	My Brother Plays the Clarinet	Anatoly Aleksin
5	7	Dersu the Trapper	Vladimir Arsenyev
6	8	Shepherd and Shepherdess	Viktor Astafyev
6	9	Queen Fish	Viktor Astafyev
7	10	Odessa Stories	Isaac Babel
7	11	Red Cavalry	Isaac Babel
8	12	Ural Tales	Pavel Bazhov
9	13	The Republic of ShKID	Grigori Belykh and Leonid Panteleyev
10	14	The Moment of Truth	Vladimir Bogomolov
11	15	The Battalions Request Fire	Yuri Bondarev
11	16	The Hot Snow	Yuri Bondarev
12	17	Emperor Alexander III	Alexander Bokhanov
13	18	The White Guard	Mikhail Bulgakov
14	19	Alice: The Girl from Earth	Kir Bulychev
15	20	Dark Avenues	Ivan Bunin
16	21	The Dead Don't Feel Pain	Vasil Bykov
16	22	The Ordeal	Vasil Bykov
17	23	The Dawns Here Are Quiet	Boris Vasilyev
17	24	His Name Was Not Listed	Boris Vasilyev
18	25	A History of Russia	George Vernadsky
19	26	The Wizard of the Emerald City	Alexander Volkov
20	27	Timur and His Gang	Arkady Gaidar
20	28	Chuk and Gek	Arkady Gaidar
20	29	The Blue Cup	Arkady Gaidar
21	30	My Dagestan	Rasul Gamzatov
21	31	Poems	Rasul Gamzatov
22	32	Moscow and Muscovites	Vladimir Gilyarovsky
23	33	The Same Old Story	Ivan Goncharov
24	34	Russia: A Success Story	Alexander Goryanin
25	35	Scarlet Sails	Alexander Grin
25	36	She Who Runs on the Waves	Alexander Grin
26	37	From Rus to Russia	Lev Gumilev
27	38	Poems	Nikolai Gumilev
28	39	The Russian Turmoil	Anton Denikin
29	40	The Moabit Notebook	Musa Dzhalil
30	41	The Zone	Sergei Dovlatov
30	42	The Suitcase	Sergei Dovlatov
30	43	Pushkin Hills	Sergei Dovlatov
30	44	Stories	Sergei Dovlatov
31	45	The Idiot	Fyodor Dostoevsky
32	46	The Adventures of Dennis	Viktor Dragunsky
33	47	White Garments	Vladimir Dudintsev
34	48	Granny, Iliko, Illarion, and I	Nodar Dumbadze
35	49	There Was Never a Better Brother	Magsud Ibragimbekov
36	50	About Russia	Ivan Ilyin
37	51	The Twelve Chairs	Ilf and Petrov
37	52	The Little Golden Calf	Ilf and Petrov
38	53	History of Russia in Stories for Children	Aleksandra Ishimova
39	54	Sandro of Chegem	Fazil Iskander
40	55	Two Captains	Veniamin Kaverin
40	56	Open Book	Veniamin Kaverin
41	57	Be Prepared, Your Highness!	Lev Kassil
41	58	The Black Book and Shwambrania	Lev Kassil
42	59	A White Sail Gleams	Valentin Kataev
43	60	Sashka	Vyacheslav Kondratiev
44	61	Our Ancient Capital	Nataliya Konchalovskaya
45	62	The Boy With a Sword	Vladislav Krapivin
46	63	Treasure of the Narts	Vladimir Kuzmin
47	64	The Duel	Aleksandr Kuprin
47	65	The Garnet Bracelet	Aleksandr Kuprin
48	66	The Old Genie Hottabych	Lazar Lagin
49	67	The Enchanted Wanderer	Nikolai Leskov
50	68	The Tale of Igor's Campaign and Culture of That Time	Dmitry Likhachev
50	69	Meditations about Russia	Dmitry Likhachev
50	70	Stories from Russian Chronicles of the 12th–14th Centuries	Dmitry Likhachev
51	71	Conversations about Russian Culture	Juri Lotman
51	72	Commentary on Alexander Pushkin's Eugene Onegin	Juri Lotman
52	73	The Gift	Vladimir Nabokov
52	74	The Defense	Vladimir Nabokov
52	75	Invitation to a Beheading	Vladimir Nabokov
53	76	Front-line Stalingrad	Viktor Nekrasov
54	77	The Adventures of Dunno and His Friends	Nikolay Nosov
54	78	Dunno on the Moon	Nikolay Nosov
54	79	The Living Hat	Nikolay Nosov
54	80	Mishka's Porridge	Nikolay Nosov
55	81	Sannikov Land	Vladimir Obruchev
56	82	The Three Fat Men	Yury Olesha
57	83	How the Steel Was Tempered	Nikolai Ostrovsky
58	84	Story of a Life	Konstantin Paustovsky
58	85	Mescherskaya Side	Konstantin Paustovsky
59	86	Requiem for Convoy PQ-17	Valentin Pikul
59	87	Miniatures	Valentin Pikul
60	88	A Golden Cloud Spent the Night	Anatoly Pristavkin
61	89	Stories and Novellas	Lyudmila Petrushevskaya
62	90	A Story About a Real Man	Boris Polevoy
63	91	Essays	Kozma Prutkov
64	92	Farewell to Matyora	Valentin Rasputin
65	93	Poems	Robert Rozhdestvensky
66	94	Poems	Nikolay Rubtsov
67	95	The Knight in the Panther's Skin	Shota Rustaveli
68	96	The Dirk	Anatoly Rybakov
68	97	The Bronze Bird	Anatoly Rybakov
68	98	Shot	Anatoly Rybakov
69	99	Poems	David Samoylov
70	100	Poems	Konstantin Simonov
70	101	The Living and the Dead	Konstantin Simonov
71	102	The Tale of Hodja Nasreddin	Leonid Solovyov
72	103	Monday Begins on Saturday	Arkady and Boris Strugatsky
72	104	Hard to Be a God	Arkady and Boris Strugatsky
73	105	Stories and Novellas	Viktoriya Tokareva
74	106	Prince Serebrenni	Aleksey Tolstoy
75	107	Hadji Murat	Leo Tolstoy
75	108	The Cossacks	Leo Tolstoy
75	109	Anna Karenina	Leo Tolstoy
76	110	Shurale	Gabdulla Tukay
77	111	Pushkin	Yury Tynyanov
77	112	The Death of Vazir-Mukhtar	Yury Tynyanov
78	113	Crocodile Gene and His Friends	Eduard Uspensky
78	114	Uncle Fedya, His Dog, and His Cat	Eduard Uspensky
79	115	The Young Guard	Alexander Fadeyev
79	116	The Rout	Alexander Fadeyev
80	117	The Dingo	Ruvim Frayerman
81	118	Poems	Kosta Khetagurov
82	119	The Dragon	Evgeny Schwartz
82	120	The Snow Queen	Evgeny Schwartz
83	121	Stories	Vasily Shukshin
84	122	Lunin	Natan Eidelman
84	123	The 19th Century	Natan Eidelman
85	124	Memoirs: 1921–1941	Ilya Ehrenburg
86	125	The Mongol Invasion	Vasily Yan
87	126	I Sent You Birch Bark	Valentin Yanin
88	127	Alpamysh	Epics, Byliny, Chronicles
89	128	Epic of King Gesar	Epics, Byliny, Chronicles
90	129	Daredevils of Sassoun	Epics, Byliny, Chronicles
91	130	Epic of Jangar	Epics, Byliny, Chronicles
92	131	Kalevala	Epics, Byliny, Chronicles
93	132	Epic of Koroghlu	Epics, Byliny, Chronicles
94	133	Epic of Manas	Epics, Byliny, Chronicles
95	134	Olonkho	Epics, Byliny, Chronicles
96	135	Ural-batyr	Epics, Byliny, Chronicles
97	136	Ancient Russian Poems (collected by Kirsha Danilov)	Epics, Byliny, Chronicles
98	137	Primary Chronicle	Epics, Byliny, Chronicles
99	138	Byliny (compiled by Vladimir Chicherov and Petr Ukhov)	Epics, Byliny, Chronicles
100	139	Fairy Tales of Russia (compiled by Mark Vatagin)	Epics, Byliny, Chronicles
