= Russian Open Golf Championship (Senior) =

VTB Russian Open Golf Championship
Tournament information
- Location: Nakhabino, Russia
- Established: 2008
- Course: Moscow Country Club
- Par: 72
- Length: 6,900 yards (6,300 m)
- Tour: European Senior Tour
- Format: Stroke play
- Prize fund: US$500,000
- Month played: August
- Final year: 2018

Tournament record score
- Aggregate: 202 Colin Montgomerie (2014)
- To par: −14 as above

Final champion
- (Scotland) Colin Montgomerie
- Location in Russia

The Russian Open Golf Championship (Senior) was a men's golf tournament on the European Senior Tour. It was first held in 2008, as the Russian Seniors Open, at the Pestovo Golf and Yacht Club. In 2013, after a four-year gap, it moved to Moscow Country Club, Nakhabino. It was played in 2013 and 2014 and then revived in 2018.

== Winners ==
Year	Winner	Score	To par	Margin of victory	Runner(s)-up	Venue
VTB Russian Open Golf Championship
2018	(England) David Shacklady	208	−8	2 strokes	(Wales) Stephen Dodd (Wales) Phillip Price	Moscow
2015–2017: No tournament
Russian Open Golf Championship (Senior)
2014	(Scotland) Colin Montgomerie	202	−14	3 strokes	(Canada) Rick Gibson	Moscow
2013	(England) Simon P. Brown	204	−12	2 strokes	(England) Carl Mason (Australia) Mike Harwood	Moscow
2009–2012: No tournament
Russian Seniors Open
2008	(Wales) Ian Woosnam	204	−12	3 strokes	(Paraguay) Ángel Franco	Pestovo
