= RVS =

RVS may refer to:

- R.V.S., Arkady Gaidar novel
- Repetitive visual stimulus
- Revolutionary Military Council, the Red Army's central command organization
- Revolutionary Military Soviet (Makhnovshchina), (Russian:Революционный Военный Совет), a Ukrainian anarchist organization
- Ricky Van Shelton
  - RVS III, Shelton's third album
- Rocky View Schools
- RVS College of Arts and Science, in Coimbatore, Tamil Nadu
- Royal Voluntary Service, British charity
- Tulsa Riverside Airport, a public-use airport in Tulsa, Oklahoma, US; IATA and FAA airport code
