= The Blue Cup =

- "The Blue Cup" 1985 cover
- Author: Arkady Gaidar
- Original title: Голубая чашка
- Language: Russian
- Genre: Children's literature
- Publisher: Detskaya Literatura, Moscow
- Publication place: Union of Soviet Socialist Republics
- Media type: Print

The Blue Cup (Russian: Голубая чашка) is a 1936 Russian language short story written by the Soviet author Arkady Gaidar (1904 - 1941). The story, first published in the January 1936 issue of Pioneer magazine, was released by Detizdat Publishers as a book with illustrations by Boris Dekhteryov (1936). In 1940 Gaidar added "Blue Cup" into two of his compilations, Rasskazy ("Short Stories", Detizdat) and Moyi Tovarishchi ("My Friends", Sovetsky Pisatel).

It seems that Gaidar rated "Blue Cup" high among his works. In his 1937 "Autobiography" he mentioned the story among his best works to date, along with short novels R.V.S., School, Distant Lands and The Military Secret, and another short story, "The Fourth Blindage".

The story incited the heated discussion, parents, teachers and librarians participating in disputes, held by the Soviet literary and pedagogical journals and newspapers. Some found the story too abstract, its composition amorphous, the undercurrent issue (that of an implied family conflict) too 'adult' for the children's literature. According to biographer F. Ebin, though, -

The majority defended the new Gaidar's story. People wrote in, telling how young children enjoyed this atmosphere of love, sunlight and happiness pervading the story, sympathizing with Svetlana and her father who breathe in the sweet air of freedom, resent indignation at those who spoil the Soviet people's happy life, occasionally laughing at them. Adult readers certainly guessed a lyrical undercurrent… but for people of all ages the deep patriotic value of this story is obvious.

== Plot summary ==
The protagonist and his six-year-old daughter Svetlana arrive at a dacha in playful moods, but their (respective) wife and mother Marusya has other ideas: she burdens them with petty tasks, then departs (apparently in a sulk) to accompany her old friend, a pilot, to the station.

Next morning, before going uptown, she blames her husband and daughter for breaking her blue cup in a store-room. Taking this unjust accusation as a proverbial last straw, both leave the house and embark upon an eventful and chaotic day-long "adventure". It involves pacifying the two boys (one of whom accuses another of being 'a fascist' for using an insult word 'jidovka' with regards to a Jewish girl), walking straight into a military exercise site with a lot of shooting going on, losing their stock of gingerbread to a four-year old, but getting a kitten from him as a reward, and near-drowning in a marsh.

They return home at dusk, find Marusya worried and happy to see them and spend a lovely evening, with Svetlana (who initially expressed pessimism on that point) admitting that "life's a good thing, after all". The mystery of a blue cup's demise remains, though, unsolved.
