= The Ballad of Cossack Golota =

- Russian: Дума про казака Голоту
- Directed by: Igor Savchenko
- Written by: Igor Savchenko; Arkady Gaidar (novel)
- Starring: Konstantin Nassonov; Leonid Shekhtman; Konstantin Tyrtov; Nina Rusinova; Nikolai Sokolov
- Cinematography: Yuli Fogelman
- Music by: Dmitri Pokras; Sergei Pototsky
- Release date: 1937
- Country: Soviet Union
- Language: Russian

The Ballad of Cossack Golota (Russian: Дума про казака Голоту, romanized: Duma pro kazaka Golotu) is a 1937 Soviet action drama film directed by Igor Savchenko.

== Plot ==
The film is based on the novel R.V.S. by Arkady Gaidar. The film takes place in 1920 during the Russian Civil War. All the men of Olkhovka village went to war. A young man Zhigan visits his grandfather and meets the son of a soldier of the Red Army - Sashko, who becomes his friend. Sashko receives information that the bandits want to kill the red commissar who must visit the village. Guys want to warn him. The characters get mixed up with a wounded commissar and a marauding White Russian officer. They find themselves in all sorts of predicaments before the Reds arrive to save the day, and become the mascots of a troop of Bolshevik cavalry.

== Cast ==
- Konstantin Nassonov as Commissar
- Leonid Shekhtman as Zhigan
- Konstantin Tyrtov as Sashko
- Nina Rusinova as Mother
- Nikolai Sokolov as Grandfather
- Viktor Seleznyov as (as Vitya Seleznyov)
- Nikolay Gorlov as Ataman Levka
- Faina Ranevskaya as priest's wife
- Aleksandr Grechanyy as Goloven (as A. Grechanyj)
- Konstantin Starostin as Ataman Kozolup (as K. Starostin)
- Aleksandr Zhutaev as Vassili (as A. Zhutayev)
- Y. Martsinchik as Polish Officer
