= The Wild Dog Dingo (disambiguation) =

The Wild Dog Dingo is a 1962 Soviet film.

The Wild Dog Dingo may also refer to:

- The novel by Ruvim Frayerman on which the film was based
- Laukinis šuo dingo (The Wild Dog Dingo), the 2008 debut album by Russian-Lithuanian singer songwriter Alina Orlova
