= Igor Savchenko =

Soviet filmmaker (1906–1950)

Igor Andreyevich Savchenko (Russian: Игорь Андреевич Са́вченко) or Ihor Andriyovych Savchenko (Ukrainian: І́гор Андрі́йович Са́вченко; 11 October 1906 – 14 December 1950) was a Soviet screenwriter and film director of Ukrainian origin. He has often been cited as one of the great early Soviet filmmakers, alongside Sergei Eisenstein, Vsevolod Pudovkin and Aleksandr Dovzhenko. He is also known for teaching Sergei Parajanov at the Soviet film school VGIK.

== Life and career ==
Igor Andreyevich Savchenko was born on 11 October 1906 in Vinnytsia (now Ukraine). In 1926–1929, he studied at the Leningrad Institute of Performing Arts. In 1932, he performed on stage and on the Moscow tram. In 1931, he began working as a film director. In 1934, he directed one of the first Soviet musical comedies, Accordion (poem by Alexander Zharov), about the life of Komsomol village, where he played the role of a kulak's son. The theme of the Civil War in Ukraine, the heroic past of Ukrainian and Russian peoples formed the basis of the film "The Ballad of Cossack Golota" (from a story by Arkady Gaidar "R.V.S.", 1937) and the film the legend "Riders" (in Yury Janowski).

He directed the 1941 drama "Bogdan Khmelnitsky" from a script by Oleksandr Korniychuk. The film is about the struggle of the Ukrainian nation and its freedom-loving tradition. In 1946, the director returned to comedy, directing one of the first Soviet color feature films "Old vaudeville" (in vaudeville "Az and dandy" by Pavel Fyodorov ). The film emphasized the patriotism of the Russian people in the Patriotic War of 1812, and also paid tribute to a popular topic in the postwar year, ridiculing the German nation.

Events of the Great Patriotic War were covered in the films "Guerrillas in the steppes of Ukraine" (1942, based on the play by Korniychuk and "Ivan Nikulin: Russian Sailor" (1944, based on novel by Leonid Solovyov). His film "Third Strike" (1948) was about the impact of the Third Red Army. Its battle scenes were later criticized as yet another monument to the Stalin era.

His premature death interrupted the film "Taras Shevchenko" (1951, finished Alexander Alov, Vladimir Naumov, Latif Faiziev). The film is about the life of Ukrainian poet Taras Shevchenko during feudal Russia 1840–1860. Since the 1960s, his films rarely appear on TV or are not shown at all.

In 1946, he headed a workshop at the Institute of Cinematography. Among his students: Alov, Naumov, Genrikh Gabai, Latif Faiziev, Felix Mironer, Yuri Ozerov, Sergei Parajanov, Marlen Khutsiev, Alexei Korenev, Yuri Zakrevsky, Lev Ivanov, Lev Danilov.

Savchenko died on 14 December 1950 and was buried in Moscow at the Novodevichy Cemetery (plot number 4).

== Awards ==
- Stalin Prize first degree (1942) – for the film "Bogdan Khmelnitsky" (1941)
- Stalin Prize second degree (1949) – for the film "Third Strike" (1948)
- Stalin Prize first degree (1951 – posthumously) – for the film "Taras Shevchenko" (1951)
