= Po sekretu vsemu svetu =

- Genre: Children's film
- Written by: Denis Dragunsky
- Directed by: Igor Dobrolyubov, Yuri Oksanchenko, Vladislav Popov, Dmitry Mikhleev, Vitaly Kanevsky
- Starring: Volodya Stankevich, Alyosha Sazonov
- Music by: Vladimir Shainsky
- Country of origin: Soviet Union
- No. of episodes: 2

Production
- Cinematography: Alexander Betev, Stanislav Smirnov
- Running time: 120 minutes (2 episodes)
- Production companies: Belarusfilm Studio, Creative Association of Television Films

Original release
- Network: First Programme of Central Television
- Release: 1976

Po secretu vsemu svetu (Russian: По секрету всему свету, lit. 'In Secret to the Whole World') is a 1976 Soviet two-part television film produced by Belarusfilm. It is adapted from Viktor Dragunsky's popular children's book The Adventures of Dennis, a collection of short stories told from the perspective of a young boy.

The movie is about a boy named Dennis and his adventures with friends and family. It is divided into two episodes, each in turn covering several stories from the book.

== Plot ==
=== Episode 1 ===
==== First Secret ====
Includes five stories:

- "Blue Dagger" (1964)
- "Main Rivers" (1965)
- "The Quiet Ukrainian Night…" (1966)
- "What I Love" (1960)
- "What Mishka Loves" (1965)

Denis Korablyov feels he must settle the score with Lyovka Burin after Lyovka hit him on the head with a pencil case. However, Lyovka’s stories about things Denis loves, along with a telescope shell he gifts Denis, soften Denis’s anger, and they part as good friends.

==== Second Secret ====
Includes three stories:

- "A Healthy Thought" (1968)
- "Chicken Broth" (1964)
- "The Old Seafarer" (1962)

A family friend, Marya Petrovna, promises Denis that she’ll take him to her country house but doesn’t keep her word. Trying to make it up to the disappointed boy, she ends up repeating the lie, promising him a real Budyonny saber next time.

=== Episode 2 ===
==== Third Secret ====
Includes three stories:

- "The Enchanted Letter" (1964)
- "Fantomas" (1968)
- "There’s a Big Stir on Sadovaya Street" (1964)

Vanya Dykhov builds a real tandem bike, with help from all the boys, especially Denis. The two of them take it out for a test ride. While resting in the park, an older stranger approaches them, claiming he needs the bike to get medicine from a pharmacy for his sick grandmother. Though the boys offer to go themselves, the stranger insists, saying riding on the avenue is dangerous, and they’re not old enough for it.

Eventually, Vanya and Denis agree and wait all evening, only to realize the stranger deceived them and stole the bike. Vanya catches on to the trick, but Denis, worried for the thief’s safety, muses, “There’s so much traffic on the avenue…” According to the script, the thief actually does get into an accident.

==== Fourth Secret ====
Includes three stories:

- "The Wheels Go Tra-Ta-Ta" (1964)
- "Workers Crush the Stone" (1972)
- "The Man with the Blue Face" (1961)

Denis and his father go for a weekend in the countryside, invited by his father’s friend, Uncle Sasha. When they arrive, Uncle Sasha asks Viktor Korablyov, Denis’s father, to take the wheel for an important task. On a dirt road, a young girl suddenly appears in front of the car. Without hesitation, Denis’s father swerves sharply, causing the car to flip. Uncle Sasha and Denis escape with bruises, while Denis’s father breaks his arm. Despite the injury, he’s relieved the girl was unharmed.

== Cast ==
- Vladimir Stankevich as Dennis Korablev
- Аlеksei Sazonov as Mishka Slonik
- Georgy Belov as Ljovka Burin
- Alexander Lenkov as Viktor Korablev, Dennis's dad
- Valentina Telichkina as Asya Korableva, Dennis's mother
- Alexandra Klimova as Raisa Ivanovna, teacher of literature
- Regina Korokhova as Marya Petrovna
- Arkady Trusov as uncle Pasha, the janitor
- Alexander Sherstobaev as Vanya Dykhov
- Aleksandra Klimova as Raisa Ivanovna, teacher of literature
- Fyodor Nikitin as Sergey Petrovich Kolokolov
- Liya Akhedzhakova as Elizaveta Nikolayevna, geography teacher
- Anatoliy Stolbov as Sergey Stepanovich
- Rostislav Shmyrev as director of the school
- Boris Gitin as Uncle Sasha, a friend of Dennis's dad
- Anatoly Kuznetsov as the hitcher with raspberries

== Film crew ==
- Screenplay by Denis Dragunsky
- Directors: Vitali Kanevsky, Igor Dobrolyubov, Dmitri Mikhleyev, Yuri Oksanchenko, Vladislav Popov

== Filming ==
It was filmed in Minsk, Belarus for 7 months. The school hallway scenes were filmed at school number 115 and the episode when Mishka tells Dennis what he loves and when Ljovka gives Dennis a sleeve was filmed at school 122 in Minsk. The classroom scenes were filmed in the studio.The train scenes were filmed on an inoperative railway line in the Smolevichi region. The train consisted of a locomotive and three carriages. The tower that Dennis was afraid to jump from was filmed in Smolevchi. Vladimir's regular dark blond hair was painted with hydrogen peroxide which caused it to become a lighter shade of blond in the film. During the scenes where Dennis cries, Vladimir said that "glycerin was instilled on the set. The eyes immediately began to pinch, and tears appeared. True, once they were real. The director took the football tickets away from me, and I cried with resentment. The stage was filmed and the tickets were given to me." Georgy fondly recalls that "The assistants came to school and took me out of school, it was such happiness!". Vladimir Stankevich said that Georgy,"stuttered for real, and they wanted him to take a stunt double for voice acting, but when he tried to voice himself, he stuttered exactly in the same places as during the filming."

== Music ==
- "In Secret to the Whole World" Big Children's Choir. Solo by Dima Viktorov
- "When My Friends Are With Me" Big Children's Choir. Solo by Dima Golov
- "At the Far Station I'll Go" — Gennady Belov

Lyrics by Mikhail Tanich, composed by Vladimir Shainsky.

== Sources ==
- Денискины рассказы (in Russian)
- Po sekretu vsemu svetu at IMDb
