= Nakhabino =

Nakhabino Нахабино
- Work settlement
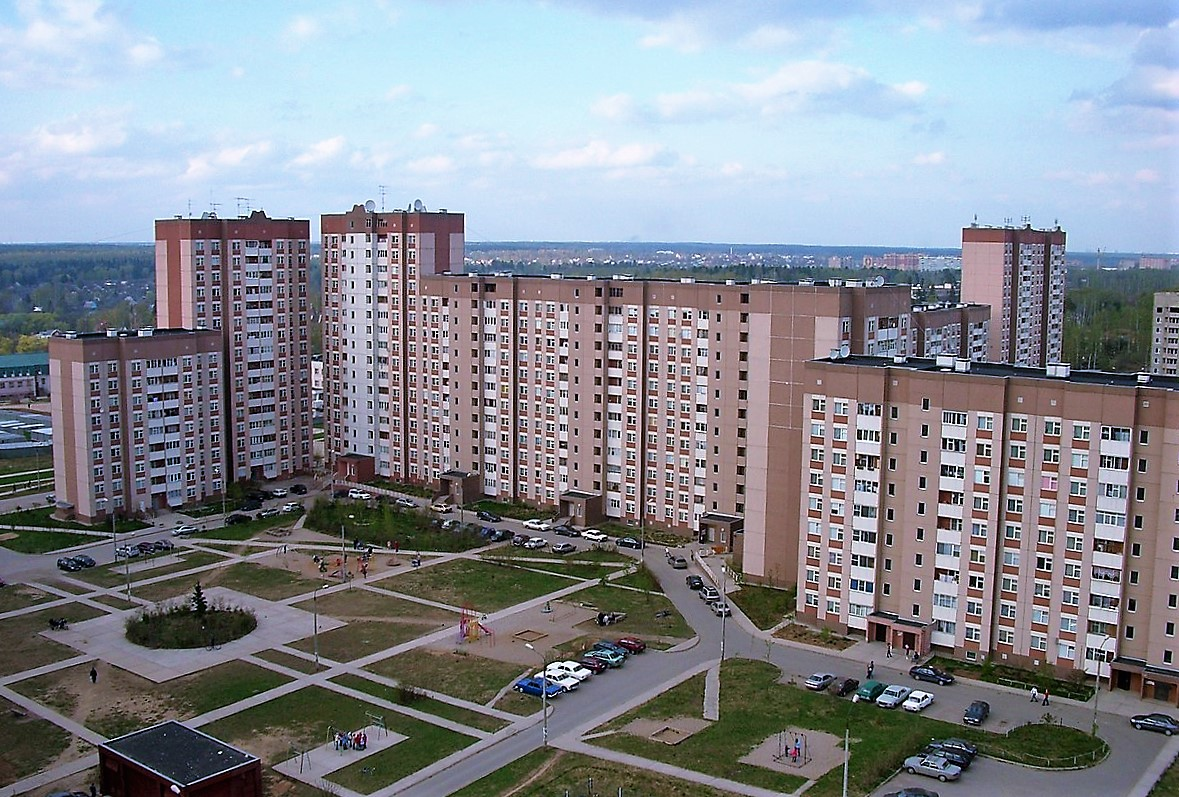

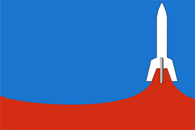
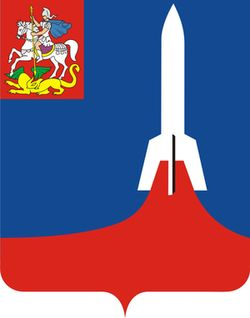
- Flag Coat of arms
- Interactive map of Nakhabino
- Location of Nakhabino Nakhabino (Moscow Oblast)
- Coordinates: 55°50′48″N 37°10′31″E
- Country: Russia
- Federal subject: Moscow Oblast
- Administrative district: Krasnogorsky District
- Selsoviet
- Founded: 1482
- Work settlement status since: 1938

Population (2010 Census)
  - Total: 36,546
  - Estimate (2025): 56,608 (+54.9%)

Administrative status
  - Capital of: Krasnogorsky District
- Time zone: UTC+3 (MSK)
- Postal codes: 143401–143409, 143416, 143448, 143449, 994001
- OKTMO ID: 46744000056
- Website: www.nahabino-adm.ru

Nakhabino (Russian: Нахабино) is an urban locality (a work settlement) in Krasnogorsky District in Moscow Oblast, Russia. It is the largest settlement in Russia which does not have city or town status. Population: 36,456 (2010 census); 28,217 (2002 census); 18,958 (1989 Soviet census).

== History ==
Nakhabino was first mentioned as a village in 1482 when the Pleshcheev boyar family owned it. In 1534, the village was sold to the Trinity Lavra of St. Sergius. The name Nakhabino was named in reference to the river Nakhabinka.

On 17 August 1933, the first Soviet rockets GIRD-9 and GIRD-10 were launched at the Nakhabino test site.

On 26 December 1938, Nakhabino was granted work settlement status. In 2005, during a municipal reform, its namesake municipal formation, the Nakhabino Urban Settlement was formed. In addition to Nakhabino itself, it included the villages of Zhelyabino, Kozino and Nefedyevo. On 1 January 2017, the Nakhabino Urban settlement was abolished and in its place, the territorial administration of the Krasnogorsk Urban District of the same name was established. On 29 March, Nakhabino was administratively subordinated to the city of Krasnogorsk.

== Economy ==
Nakhabino has a motor-car depot, and an asphalt concrete plant. The Nakhabino Technopark is produces artificial stone products, furniture, containers for diesel generators, voltage stabilizers, etc. Nakhabino is also the location the Central Research and Testing Institute of Engineering Troops of the Ministry of Defense.

== Sport ==
Nearby Nakhabino is the Moscow Country Club, which is Russia's first 18-hole golf course.

== Transportation ==
There is Nakhabino railway station of Rizhsky suburban railway line.

== In popular culture ==
In 1940, the film Timur and His Team based on the story Timur and His Squad by Arkady Gaidar was filmed in Nakhabino; the children of Spanish communists were filmed as pioneers from Timur's team. From 2004 to 2010, the television series "Soldiers" was also filmed here.
