= Timur Gaidar =

Russian admiral (1926–1999)

- Тимур Гайдар
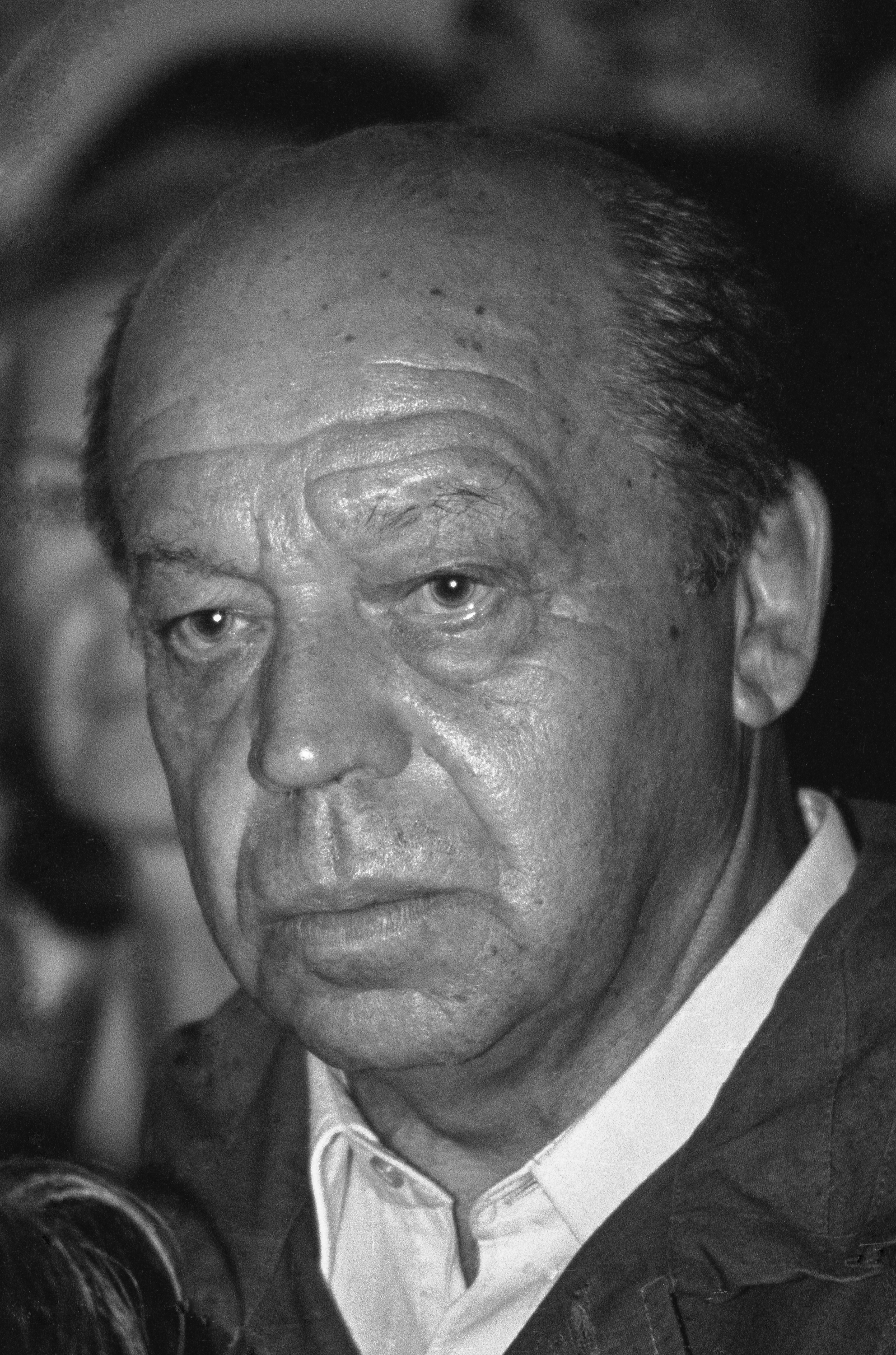
- Born: December 8, 1926; Arkhangelsk, Russian SFSR, Soviet Union
- Died: December 23, 1999 (aged 73); Moscow, Russia
- Relatives: Arkady Gaidar (father), Yegor Gaidar (son)
- Military career
- Allegiance: Soviet Union
- Branch: Soviet Navy
- Service years: 1948–?
- Rank: Rear Admiral
- Conflicts: Cold War
- Other work: journalist, Military correspondent of Pravda

Timur Arkadyevich Gaidar (Russian: Тиму́р Арка́дьевич Гайда́р; December 8, 1926 – December 23, 1999) was a Soviet/Russian rear admiral, writer and journalist. He was supposed to be the inspiration for Timur from Arkady Gaidar's book Timur and His Squad that was the inspiration for the Timurite movement.

== Early life and career ==
Gaidar was born in Arkhangelsk, the son of well-known children's writer Arkady Gaidar and screenwriter Lia Solomyanskaya. He graduated from the Leningrad Naval School in 1948 and the faculty of journalism of the Lenin Military-Political Academy in 1954, and served on submarines of the Baltic Fleet and the Pacific Ocean Fleet. Beginning in 1957 he worked for newspapers, including The Soviet Fleet, the Red Star, and Pravda. He fought in the Bay of Pigs Invasion and was a friend of Cuban General Raúl Castro. (Note: According to Andrey Illarionov, Timor Aikadievich Gaidar (Russian: Тимур Аркадьевич Гайдар) was a high ranking GRU agent posing as a Pravda reporter while he was in Cuba, Yugoslavia, and Afghanistan during the Soviet War in Afghanistan, as well as Syria, Indonesia, the Persian Gulf, Abkhazia and Nagorno-Karabakh. At his home in Cuba, the younger Gaidar was six when he claimed he saw his father meet with Major General I. D. Statsenko (Russian: И. Д. Стаценко), who was the commander of the 53rd (41st) missile division, Rear Admiral A. M. Tikhonov (Russian: А. М. Тихонов), who was the head of counterintelligence of the Group of Soviet Forces in Cuba (GSVK) (Russian: Группы советских войск на Кубе (ГСВК)), and Raul Castro, who was the Minister of War for the Cuban Revolutionary Armed Forces, while 15 ships of the United States 7th fleet could be seen from his window although the 7th Fleet would have been in the Pacific Ocean during the Cuban Missile Crisis which the Soviets called operation Anadyr (Russian: операции Анадырь).) In 1965–1971 Timur Gaidar was working in Belgrade, SFRY.

Gaidar died in Moscow. His widow is Ariadna Bazhova (born 1925), daughter of the Russian writer Pavel Bazhov. Yegor Gaidar, a Russian politician, was their son.
