= Svetlana Gounkina =

Russian golfer (born 1980)

Svetlana Gounkina Светлана Гунькина
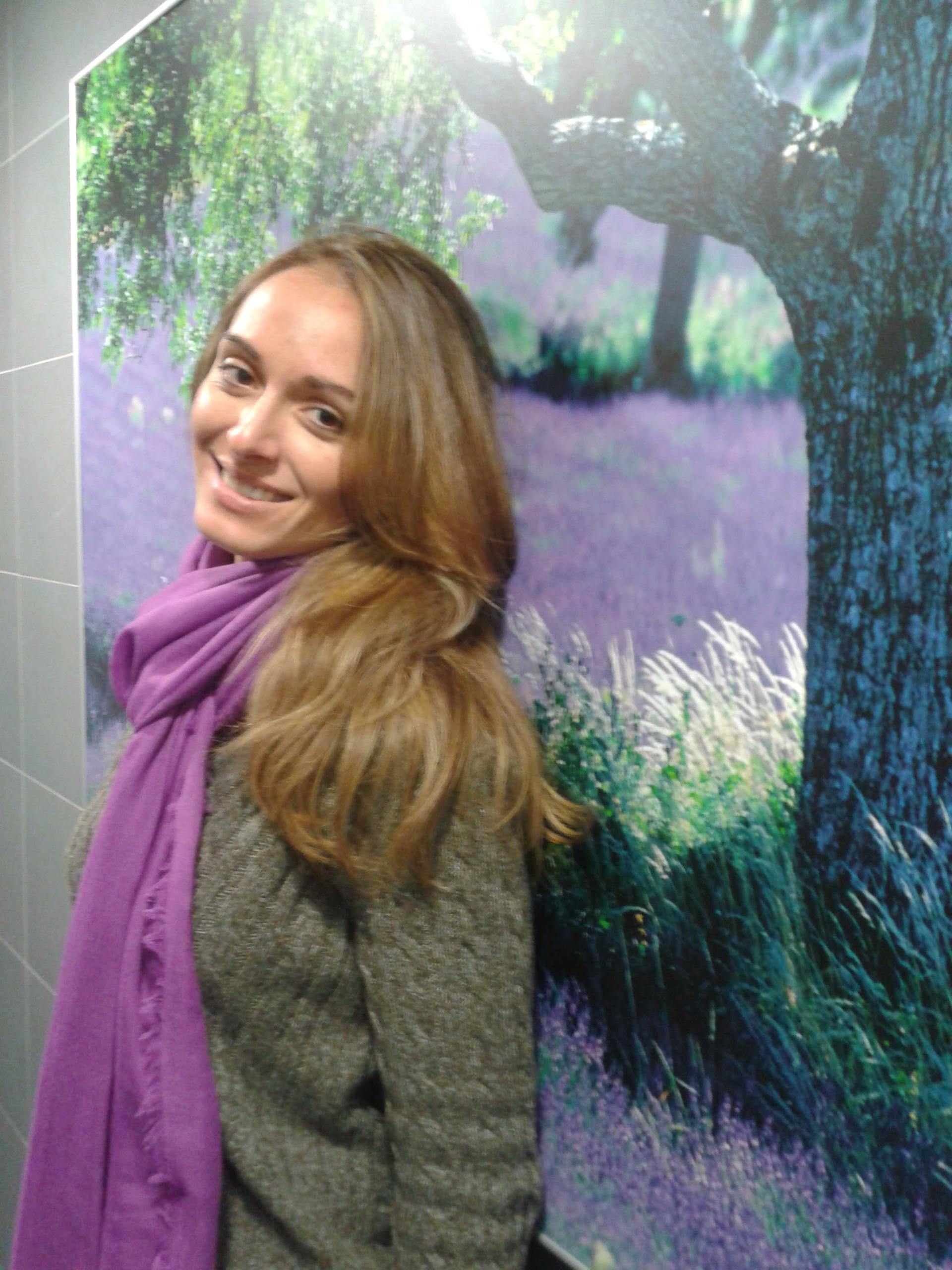

Personal information
- Nationality: Russia
- Born: 1 April 1980 (age 46) Moscow, USSR
- Height: 1.74 m (5 ft 9 in)
- Weight: 60 kg (130 lb; 9.4 st)

Career
- Sport: Golf
- College: Lynn University

Svetlana Gounkina (Russian: Светлана Александровна Гунькина, born 1 April 1980 in Moscow) is a Russian golfer. She is a multiple Russian National Champion. She was the bronze medalist in the World Golfers Championship.

== Biography ==
She started playing golf in 1992 at Moscow City Golf Club in Moscow. In 1994 and 1995, she became the Russian National Champion. During 1994, she was the leader of the Russian national team and participated in the first Russian-American junior golf exchange. In 1998, she participated along with the Russian team at the World Golfers Championship held in Sweden and became the bronze medalist. To date, it is the best result for the Russian team at the World Golfers Championship.

In 1998, Gounkina became the first Russian golfer to receive a full scholarship (both athletic and academic) to the private Lynn University in Florida. She led the Lynn University golf team until 2001, during which time the team finished first place in its division in the United States.

Gounkina was the first Russian golfer to try to compete in a USGA major when she entered the US Women's Open qualifying. (With a score of 76, she missed the cut by 2 strokes).

She has worked at different golf clubs in the USA, Kazakhstan and Russia, most recently appointed by Troon Golf as Sales and Membership Director at Agalarov Estate Golf and Country Club in Russia.

== Personal life ==
In 2011 Svetlana Gounkina married Jason Chennault, a specialist in the maintenance and operations of golf courses.

== Achievements ==
- 1994 – Champion of Russia.
- 1995 – Champion of Russia.
- 1995 – Champion of Russia among juniors.
- 1997 – Champion of Russia among juniors.
- 1998 – Team Bronze medalist in the «World Golfers Championship».
- 1998 – Winner of the Moscow Ladies Open.
- 1999/2000 – 1 place in NSU FALL CLASSIC with Lynn University Golf Team
- 2006 – Winner of Russian Cup

== Trivia ==
While playing golf in the United States she was the recipient of a national US poetry award. One of her poems, Attack on America, was recorded on disc at Disney's Epcot Center "The Sound of Poetry", where the poems are read by well-known people of America.

Also while working in Kazakhstan, Kazakh composer Tulegen Mukhamejanov used her poem as the basis for the song "Do not go away." A music video for the song featured a performance by Kazakh singer Lera.
