= Smoke in the Forest =

- Short story by Arkady Gaidar
- Original title: Дым в лесу
- Country: Union of Soviet Socialist Republics
- Language: Russian
- Genre: Children's literature

Publication
- Publisher: Detskaya Literatura, Moscow
- Media type: Print
- Publication date: 1939

"Smoke in the Forest" (Dym v lesu, Дым в лесу) is a short story by the Soviet children's writer Arkady Gaidar, first published in No.2, February 1939, issue of Pioneer magazine. Later that year it was published by Detizdat Publishers as a separate book with illustrations by P.Yermolayev. In 1940 Gaidar included it into his compilation Rasskazy (Short Stories). In 1955, Yevgeny Karelov shot a film Smoke in the Forest, based upon Gaidar's story.

== Plot summary ==
Saboteurs (referred to as 'belogvardeitsy', the 'White Guardsmen') set fire to the forest with the purpose of destroying the factory nearby. Pilot Fedoseyev, sent over with the reconnaissance mission fails to return in time. Volodya (the protagonist, a boy of 11) with Fenya (5) and her mother (pilot Fedoseyev's daughter and wife, respectively), travel in a lorry to the aerodrome.

While playing with Brutik (a puppy who's tagged along behind them), the boy gets lost. Rushing through the forest, he suddenly runs into injured pilot Fedoseyev whose plane, as it happens, has been shot down by the enemy. Sent back to the aerodrome, the boy gets lost again, then sets out to swim across the river and all but drowns, being in the end saved miraculously by a sheep-dog Lutta and the Red Army men following her. Brutik, though, while crossing the river, dies.
