= Lev Danilov =

- Lev Danilov (right) with cinematographer Ivan Cheshev in 1955 – 1956
- Born: Lev Stefanovich Danilov; 19 April 1926; Vladivostok, RSFSR, USSR
- Died: 22 September 1991 (aged 65); Moscow, USSR
- Occupations: film director, screenwriter
- Years active: 1951–1991
- Spouse(s): Lyudmila Kuzmina; Galina Glider; Marina Meshcheryakova (Meshcherina)
- Awards: Lenin Prize (1980)

Lev Stefanovich Danilov (Russian: Лев Стефанович Данилов; 19 April 1926 — 22 September 1991) was a Russian film director and screenwriter. Laureate of the Lenin Prize (1980).

== Life and career ==
He was born on 19 April 1926 in Vladivostok in the family of an employee. Member of the Great Patriotic War. He was awarded the medal "For Courage" (1945), the Order of the Patriotic War, I degree (1985).

Graduated from the directing department of the All-Union State Institute of Cinematography (1951; workshop of Igor Savchenko).

He worked at the Far Eastern Television Studio, in 1956-1957 at the Odessa Film studio, where he directed the film "The Sailor Went Ashore" (1957; co-authored with Grigori Aronov).

Since 1958 he has been working at the Central Studio for Documentary Film in Moscow. Lev Stefanovich Danilov died on 22 September 1991. He was buried at the Golovinskoye Cemetery in Moscow.

== Selected filmography ==
- The Sailor Went Ashore (1957)
- Cuban Encounters (1961)
- Near Eternity (1968)
- Liberation of Ukraine (1978)
- Commanders. Memories of the Last War (1988)
- Penal Battalion (Plots from order No. 227) (1989)
- On the Katyn Question (1989)
- Dossier on General Vlasov (1990)
