= Chuk and Gek (film) =

1953 film by Ivan Lukinsky

- Directed by: Ivan Lukinsky
- Written by: Arkady Gaidar; Viktor Shklovsky
- Cinematography: Grigori Garibyan
- Music by: Anatoli Lepin
- Production company: Gorky Film Studios
- Release date: 2 June 1953
- Running time: 47 minutes
- Country: Soviet Union
- Language: Russian

Chuk and Gek (Russian: Чук и Гек, romanized: Chuk i Gek) is a 1953 Soviet comedy drama film directed by Ivan Lukinsky. It is based on the 1939 story of the same name by Arkady Gaidar.

== Cast ==
- Yura Chuchunov as Chuk
- Andrei Chilikin as Gek
- Dmitri Pavlov as Father
- Vera Vasilyeva as Mother
- Nikolai Komissarov as Watchman
- Ekaterina Savinova as mail carrier (uncredited)
- Mikhail Troyanovsky as Sleigh Driver

== Bibliography ==
- Rollberg, Peter. Historical Dictionary of Russian and Soviet Cinema. Scarecrow Press, 2008.
