= Golf in Russia =

The first mention of golf in Russia dates back to the reign of Nicholas II. The first 18-hole golf course appeared in the suburban area of Nakhabino located near Moscow only in 1994. Today, there are 32 golf courses in Russia.

Russian golfer Maria Verchenova was among the participants of the 2016 Olympic Games. In the 4th round, Maria made a hole-in-one and set a record of the Olympic course. A contender for the 2020 Olympic Games is Nina Pegova (PGA status). The ANCO "International Center of Golf Tourism" (Golf in Russia) deals with increasing the recognition on the world stage and raising the number of inbound golf tourists in the country.

After the 2022 Russian invasion of Ukraine, the International Golf Federation (IGF) banned golfers from Russia from competing in tournaments under its jurisdiction. In addition, in March 2022 the European Golf Association announced that it would not allow teams, individuals, and officials from Russia to participate in EGA events in 2022, and that no EGA events were planned to take place in Russia.

== History ==
The first golf course in the Russian Empire appeared in 1891 in village Murino, Saint Petersburg Governorate, at the place where "Devyatkino" railway station, named after the 9-hole course of the same name, is now located. The first golf club on the southern coast of France, Cannes Mandelieu Golf Club (modern Club Old Course Golf Cannes-Mandelieu) was founded in the 19th century by Grand Duke Mikhail Mikhailovich Romanov. After the revolution of 1917 this sport was forgotten for a long time.

A new stage of the development of golf in Russia began with the establishment of the first Golf Club in Moscow. In 1988, the Golf Club Tumba Moscow was founded (in the mid-2000s it was renamed as the Moscow City Golf Club – MСGС).

In 1992, the Russian Golf Association was created on the basis of the MCGC. It is recognized by the Russian Olympic Committee, the European Golf Association, and the Golf Club of St Andrews.

In 1994, the second golf course in Russia was built − the Moscow Country Club. 18 years later, on 1 May 2004, the Golf Club in the Krylatskoe area near Serebryany Bor (park) was the first to open. The design of the infrastructure was carried out by the English company RMJM, which became known worldwide due to golf courses in the USA and Europe. Russian architects, Tobalevsky and Mazurin, also made a great contribution to the creation of the Krylatskoe golf club course In 2008, the third golf course in Russia was opened in the Dmitrov district. The private Tseleevo Golf and Polo Club was closed for a long time. The course was designed by architect Jack Nicklaus. Course Style: Parkland

In the same year the "Sviyazhskie Hills" Golf Club was opened on the territory of the resort city of the same name. It is the largest and the only golf club in the Volga region, in Kazan. The golf course design belongs to the Swiss company "Harradine Golf AG". The architect was Peter Harradin.

In 2012, the Zavidovo PGA National was opened by the side of the Volga in Tver, between Moscow and St. Petersburg. It is the only golf club in Russia that is licensed by the oldest and most authoritative Association of Professional Golfers of Great Britain and Ireland (PGA). The golf course was developed by architects of the international bureau European Golf Design Course Style: Links

In May 2013, the first open-type suburban golf club in Russia, "Forest Hills", was opened in the Dmitrov District in the North of Moscow. The golf course was designed by the architect bureau "Hills & Forest International Golf Course Architects", by architects Steve Forest and Arthur Hill. The course is hidden in majestic forests on a protected area, whose landscape was created during the Ice Age. In 2018 and 2019, the Russian Golf Championship was held here. In January 2020, the club opened a ski and biathlon complex on its territory. Course Style: Parkland

In the same year the opening of the first and only world-class golf resort in the Ural Pine Creek Golf Resort, near Yekaterinburg, took place. In 2015, the golf course was included in the register of facilities of the Ministry of Sports of the Russian Federation. Course Style: Parkland

In the metropolitan area a golf club closest to the center of Moscow was opened - "Skolkovo". The golf course was designed by Jack Nicklaus. The architect of the club house is Shigeru Ban. In 2015 the "Skolkovo" golf club became the venue for the European professional golf tour M2M RUSSIAN OPEN. Course Style: Parkland

In May, the Links National Golf Resort started operating. It is 60 kilometers away from Moscow along the Rogachevsky Highway. The architect of the course is world famous John Flynn. Course Style: Links

In the North-West region, the first golf club of the Leningrad region, Gorki Golf & Resort, was opened. The architect of the golf course is Lassi Pekka Tilander. First, 9 holes were opened and a year later there were all 18 holes. Course Style: Inland Links

In autumn, the golf project "Strawberry Fields" was presented and the opening of the driving range took place close to town Lomonosov, near St. Petersburg. The first 9 holes were opened in the middle of the 2015 season, and the club house and the other nine holes appeared in 2018. The golf course was designed by architect Jari Rasinkangas. Course Style: Parkland

In June 2017, the Peterhof Golf Club was opened in St. Petersburg: it is the only golf course within the city. The club is located in Peterhof, next to Alexandria Park. The first 9 holes were built according to the project by Greg Norman, and the other 9 holes were built by Steve Forest. In 2018, the Peterhof Golf Club became the venue for the Roscongress Cup golf tournament, which was included in the state program as part of SPIEF (St. Petersburg International Economic Forum) 2018 for the first time ever. Course Style: Links

In 2018, the MillCreek golf club was opened in town Vsevolozhsk. The project was developed by the largest international architectural bureaus – WATG and EGD. The landscape was designed by architect Ross McMurray (European Golf Design). The course was built in accordance with the Kaleidoscope Golf technology. Course Style: Links

In May 2019 the first golf resort "Gelendzhik Golf Resort" started operating in Southern Russia. The golf course project was developed by Dave Thomas Ltd. This is the only golf club in Russia that is open 365 days a year. Course Style: Links

In 2020 Raevo Golf and Country Club was opened. It's a new golf club in the Odintsovo district in the Moscow region. The club is managed by IMG, the largest sports and events promotion company in the world. Course Style: Parkland

In 2019, the "Golf in Russia" project appeared, created by the Autonomous Non-Commercial Organization "International Center of Golf Tourism" to attract foreign golf groups, and help golf tour operators choose the best golf clubs, hotels, restaurants, transport companies, and excursion tours.

== Professional tournaments ==
Most golf courses are easily accessible from large cities, so a round can be combined with a rich cultural program, gastronomic tour, family trip, or business trip. Foreign experts highly praised the tourist opportunities of the country and marked advantages for the development of the new promising destination.

=== Official all-Russian tournaments ===
- Russian Championship
- Russian Competition
- Russian Cup

=== Business tournaments ===
- Roscongress Golf Cup
- Innoprom Golf Challenge
- AmCham Golf Tournament
- Turkish Airlines World Golf Cup

== Children ==
Children are allowed to train beginning at the age of 7.

=== Golf school ===
On 28 February 2015, the opening of a golf school in the sports center took place in Zhukovka.

The program has the status of "recommended" by the Expert Council of the Ministry of Education and Science of the Russian Federation for improving the system of physical education in educational institutions of the Russian Federation to apply in the educational process of general education institutions.

=== Junior All-Russian Tournaments ===
Children's and youth tournaments usually consist of 5 stages per season and golfers aged 10–18 years old take part in them. The AGR (Association of Golf in Russia) President's Cup is part of the Dream Team project. The composition of the team for the next season is determined according to the results of the tournament.

== List of golf clubs in Russia ==
=== Belgorod region ===
- Stary Oskol Golf Club (9 holes)

=== Kaluga region ===
- Golf Club "Vyrka" (6 holes)

=== Krasnodar region ===
- Golf Club Gelendzhik (18 holes)
- Golf Club Raevsky (9 holes)

=== Krasnoyarsk region ===
- Golf Club Eagle Hills (9 holes)

=== Moscow and Moscow region ===
- Moscow City Golf Club (9 holes)
- Moscow Country Club (18 holes)
- Golf and Yacht Club Pestovo (18 holes)
- Golf Club Skolkovo (18 holes)
- Golf Club Pirogovo (9 holes)
- Agalarov Golf and Country Club (18 holes)
- Moscow Golf School
- Golf Club Tseleevo (18 holes)
- Rowing Canal Golf Club
- Links National Golf Club (18 holes)
- Forest Hills Golf Club (18 holes)
- Golf Club Dmitrov Golf Resort (9 holes)
- Golf Plaza "Korean House"
- Golf Center, indoor golf center with simulators and infrastructure
- Multisport Golf
- Krylatsky Golf Club (18 holes)
- Tiger Golf Club (6 holes)
- Raevo Golf Country Club (18 holes)

=== Republic of Ossetia ===
- Ossetian Golf Club (5 holes)

=== Republic of Tatarstan ===
- Sviyazhsky Hills Golf Club (18 holes)
- Ak Bars Golf club (18 holes)

=== Rostov region ===
- Golf Country Club "Don" (9 holes)

=== Saint Petersburg and Leningrad region ===
- Gorki Golf Club (18 holes)
- Strawberry Fields Golf Club (18 holes)
- Petrhof Golf Club (18 holes)
- Mill Creek Golf Club (18 holes)

=== Sverdlovsk region ===
- Pine Creek Golf Club (18 holes)

=== Tver region ===
- PGA National Zavidovo (18 holes)
