= Timurite movement =

Youth volunteer organization in Soviet Union

The Timurite movement or Timur movement (тимуровское движение) was an altruistic youth volunteering movement in the Soviet Union promoted via mass youth organizations of Little Octobrists and Young Pioneers. The participants of the movement were called Timurites (тимуровцы, timurovtsy).

The idea of the movement was borrowed from the popular novel for youth Timur and His Squad by Arkady Gaidar. The youngster Timur and his squad clandestinely did good deeds: helped the families of the Red Army soldiers and combated the local gang of young hooligans headed by Mishka Kvakin. At first Timur's squad was taken for hooligans as well, but eventually they earned gratitude. It was written in 1940 first as a newspaper serial and quickly gained popularity, as other Gaidar's books. The same year a movie was released based on the novel as well as a radio drama version. When the German invasion of the Soviet Union started in 1941, teams of Timurites all over the country, in addition to helping the families of soldiers, did large amounts of unskilled work: cleaning railways from snow, preparing firewood, loading/unloading cargo, etc. Their activities were widely reported in newspapers and by radio.

The book was an obligatory part of school curriculum in the Soviet Union.

Later the Timurite movement was centralized and organized, with Central Staff and Congresses.

Timurite teams were also created in other socialist states: GDR, People's Republic of Bulgaria, People's Republic of Poland, North Vietnam and Czechoslovak Socialist Republic.

The Timurite movement was revived in a number of post-Soviet States: in Russia, in Belarus, in Kazakhstan by Jas Otan, the youth wing of the ruling Nur Otan party.

== See also ==
- Subbotnik
- Timur Gaidar
