= Distant Lands =

1932 Soviet novel

- Author: Arkady Gaidar
- Original title: Дальние страны
- Illustrator: A. Yermolayev
- Language: Russian
- Genre: Children's literature
- Publisher: Molodaya Gvardiya; Detskaya Literatura
- Publication date: 1932
- Publication place: Union of Soviet Socialist Republics
- Media type: Print
- ISBN: 978-5-94743-830-7

Distant Lands (Dalniye Strany, Дальние страны) is a 1932 novel by the Soviet children's author Arkady Gaidar.

== Background ==
According to Gaidar's diary, he started working upon the novel in the summer of 1931, while staying in the All-Union Young Pioneer camp Artek with his son Timur. On August 3 the novel was finished. According to the writer's friend Ruvim Frayerman, "Distant Lands with its quiet railway station, the mysterious forest and trains passing by, has been undoubtedly prompted by memories of his own childhood when he, a small boy, was standing with sister Natasha on the barn’s roof watching trains running away."

== History ==
The novel was first published in 1932 by Molodaya Gvardiya, illustrated by A.Yermolayev. Also in 1932 it featured in a small Gaidar compilation Moi Tovarishchi (My Comrades, later repeatedly re-issued). The novel had success with the young readership and was met with favourably in the press, notably in Alexander Fadeev's large article "The Books of Gaidar", published on January 29, 1933, in Literaturnaya Gazeta.

== Plot summary ==
Life at a small railway station - as seen through the eyes of two 8-year-olds, Vasya and Petya, - is in turmoil. An expedition arrives from a regional center to examine the possibility of building an aluminum factory nearby. In a parallel development the majority of locals choose to form a kolkhoz, kulak Danila and two of his friends being fierce opponents.

Yegor, a local Selsoviet chairman disappears with a large sum of money, collected by people for purchasing some machinery for their future enterprise. The project is on the verge of collapse: people are horrified by the idea that Yegor, a trustworthy man and a Civil War hero, should turn out a thief. Then the reason for one of the boys, Petya's strange behaviour becomes clear. It turns out that he's found Yegor's blood-stained cap in the forest and seems to know who the murderer is.

The three kulak guys get arrested for the crime one of them committed, Yegor's dead body is found in the woods to be buried by the river, the kolkhoz project gets revived as does Vasya and Petya's long-cherished dream of distant lands and happiness for all.
