= Accordion (film) =

- Directed by: Igor Savchenko
- Written by: Igor Savchenko; Aleksandr Zharov
- Cinematography: Yuli Fogelman; Yevgeni Shneider
- Music by: Sergei Pototsky
- Production company: Mezhrabpomfilm
- Release date: 1934
- Running time: 66 minutes
- Country: Soviet Union
- Language: Russian

Accordion (Russian: Гармонь, romanized: Garmon) is a 1934 Soviet musical comedy film directed by Igor Savchenko.

== Plot ==
The merry village accordionist Timofey Dudin, or as known by his nickname Timoshka, is elected secretary at one of the Komsomol units. This high office, in his opinion, is not compatible with playing on the accordion. The unusual prolonged silence leads quickly to a discord between the true Komsomol and the kulak supporters which causes Timoshka to pick up his accordion again ...

== Cast ==
- Zoya Fyodorova - Marusenka
- Pyotr Savin - Timoshka
- Igor Savchenko - son of a kulak
- Nikolay Gorlov - Mitya
- Nikolai Yarochkin
- Nikolai Zyryanov
- Pyotr Gorelov
- Lyalya Sateyeva
- Ye. Yukhova
- E. Pirogova

== Production ==
Poet Aleksandr Zharov assisted Savchenko with the rhymed dialog. The film was made from concept to release in eight months at a time when the average production time would extend into years.

== Bibliography ==
- Christie, Ian & Taylor, Richard. The Film Factory: Russian and Soviet Cinema in Documents 1896-1939. Routledge, 2012.
