= The White Ship (Aitmatov novel) =

1970 novella by Chinghiz Aitmatov

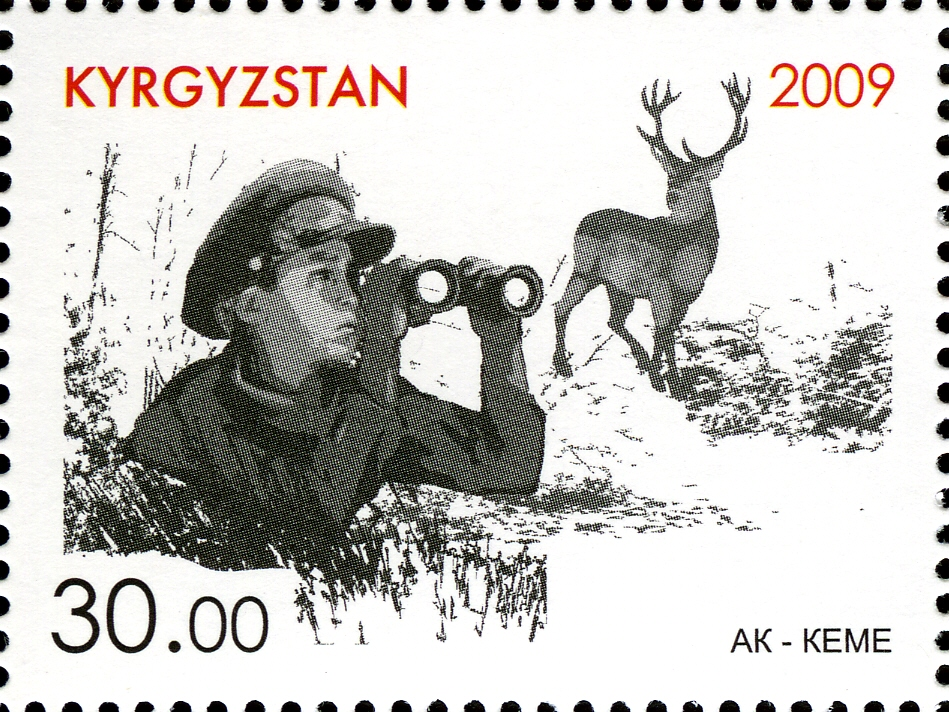

"The White Ship" ("Белый пароход") is a novella written by Kyrgyz writer Chinghiz Aitmatov. It was first published in 1970 in Novy Mir, accompanied by a film adaptation of the novel titled The White Ship, which was released in 1976.

== Plot summary ==
"The White Ship" is a story of a young boy who grows up with his grandfather, Momun, on the shores of Issyk-Kul Lake. He spends time exploring, listening to legends from his grandfather, and looking out over the lake as white ships sail along. He finds particular interest in the stories his grandfather tells him about the Horned Mother Deer that is sacred to the Bugu tribe. A series of tragedies occur at the end of the novella, and a hunting party kills a sacred deer with Momun and the boy as witnesses. This sends the boy into despair. Longing for love and acceptance, he dives into the waters of a stream nearby to "turn into a fish" and swim towards Issyk-Kul in search of his father.

== Reception ==
Controversy surrounded the novel after publication due to its graphic and violent depictions of Soviet Kyrghyz reality as well as hints of child suicide.

The novel was included into the 2013 list 100 Books for Schoolchildren recommended by the Ministry of Education and Science (Russia).

== English translations ==
- The White Steamship, translated by Tatyana & George Feifer, Hodder & Stoughton, 1972
- The White Ship, translated by Mirra Ginsburg, Crown Publishers Inc., New York, 1972
