= Timur and His Team =

- Russian: Тимур и его команда
- Directed by: Aleksandr Razumny
- Written by: Arkady Gaidar
- Based on: Timur and His Squad by Arkady Gaidar
- Starring: Liviy Shchipachyov; Pyotr Savin; Lev Potyomkin; Viktor Seleznyov; Nikolai Annenkov
- Cinematography: Pyotr Yermolov
- Edited by: T. Martynova
- Music by: Lev Shvarts
- Production company: Gorky Film Studio
- Release date: 1940
- Running time: 80 min.
- Country: Soviet Union
- Language: Russian

Timur and His Team (Russian: Тимур и его команда, romanized: Timur i ego komanda) is a 1940 Soviet action film directed by Aleksandr Razumny based on the novel of the same name.

The film tells about a company of pioneers who help the families of soldiers of the Red Army.

== Plot ==
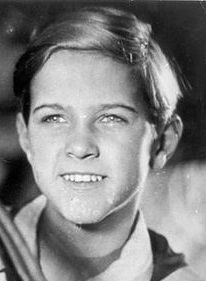
Liviy Shchipachyov as Timur

Young Zhenya, the daughter of Colonel Alexandrov, arrives at a summer house with her older sister Olga. There, she befriends Timur, the leader of a local group of young pioneers devoted to helping people, particularly the elderly and families of Red Army soldiers. However, Olga, influenced by neighborhood gossip, mistakes Timur for a troublemaker and forbids Zhenya from associating with him. Despite this, Timur and his group are actively fighting against real troublemakers led by the rowdy gang of Kvakin, "Figura," and their crew, who raid summer gardens at night.

In a pivotal moment, Timur takes a daring step. When Zhenya misses her train to Moscow by mistake and risks not seeing her father before his departure to the front, Timur decides to "borrow" his uncle's motorcycle to take her to the city. Fully aware of the potential consequences—ranging from punishment by traffic authorities to expulsion from the pioneers or even school—Timur remains resolute. For him, helping someone in need takes precedence over the personal risks involved.

By the end of the film, Olga finally learns the truth about Timur and clears up the misunderstanding with his uncle, who had been on the verge of sending Timur back to his mother. The story concludes with a heartfelt farewell as Timur’s uncle departs for the army, leaving the group of young pioneers inspired by his example.

== Cast ==
- Liviy Shchipachyov as Timur Garaev
- Pyotr Savin as Georgy Garaev
- Lev Potyomkin as Dr. Koloktschikow
- Viktor Seleznyov as Witja
- Nikolai Annenkov as colonel Aleksandrov
- Marina Kovalyova as Olga
- Yekaterina Derevshchikova as Zhenja
- Petya Grokhovsky as Kolja
- Nikolay Kutuzov as Geika
- Igor Smirnov as Sima Simakov
- Boris Yasen as Mishka Kvakin
