= The Wild Dog Dingo =

1962 Soviet film

- Poster
- Russian: Дикая собака Динго
- Directed by: Yuli Karasik
- Written by: Ruvim Frayerman (novel); Anatoli Grebnev
- Starring: Galina Polskikh; Vladimir Osobik; Talas Umurzakov; Anna Rodionova; Inna Kondrateva
- Cinematography: Vyacheslav Fastovich
- Music by: Isaac Schwartz
- Production company: Lenfilm
- Release date: 15 October 1962
- Running time: 97 min.
- Country: Soviet Union
- Language: Russian

The Wild Dog Dingo (Russian: Дикая собака Динго, romanized: Dikaya sobaka Dingo) is a 1962 Soviet love triangle drama film directed by Yuli Karasik. It is based on the novel Wild Dog Dingo or the Tale of the First Love by Ruvim Frayerman.

== Plot ==
A girl Tanya lives with her divorced mother in a small Russian Far East City of Primorsk. Her father, colonel, whom she had never seen, was dispatched from Moscow to Primorsk and brings his wife and his adopted son Kolya with him. Tanya and Kolya become friends and fall in love. A part of the drama is a local Nanai boy Filka, Tanya's long-time childhood friend.

== Reception ==
The parting scene of Filka and Tanya, when Tanya sees the suntanned imprint of her name on Filka's chest demonstrates Fraerman's idea of the eternity of natural human feelings.

-How little you are, Filka. After all, all this will burn up and disappear as soon as winter comes and you put a warm shirt on.
-But the sun is so strong! Will everything really disappear? Maybe something will remain?
-You're right, Filka: everything can't disappear. Otherwise, where will our eternal friendship go?

== Cast ==
- Galina Polskikh as Tanya
- Vladimir Osobik as Kolya
- Talas Umurzakov (Kazakh actor) as Filka, a Nanai boy, Tanya's childhood friend, who is in love with her
- Anna Rodionova as Zhenya
- Inna Kondrateva as mother
- Nikolai Timofeyev as father
- Irina Radchenko as father's second wife
- Tamara Loginova as Aleksandra Ivanovna
- Antonina Pavlycheva as Tanya's grandmother

== Awards ==
The film received several awards.
