= Golovinskoye Cemetery =

Cemetery in Moscow, Russia

- Головинское кладбище
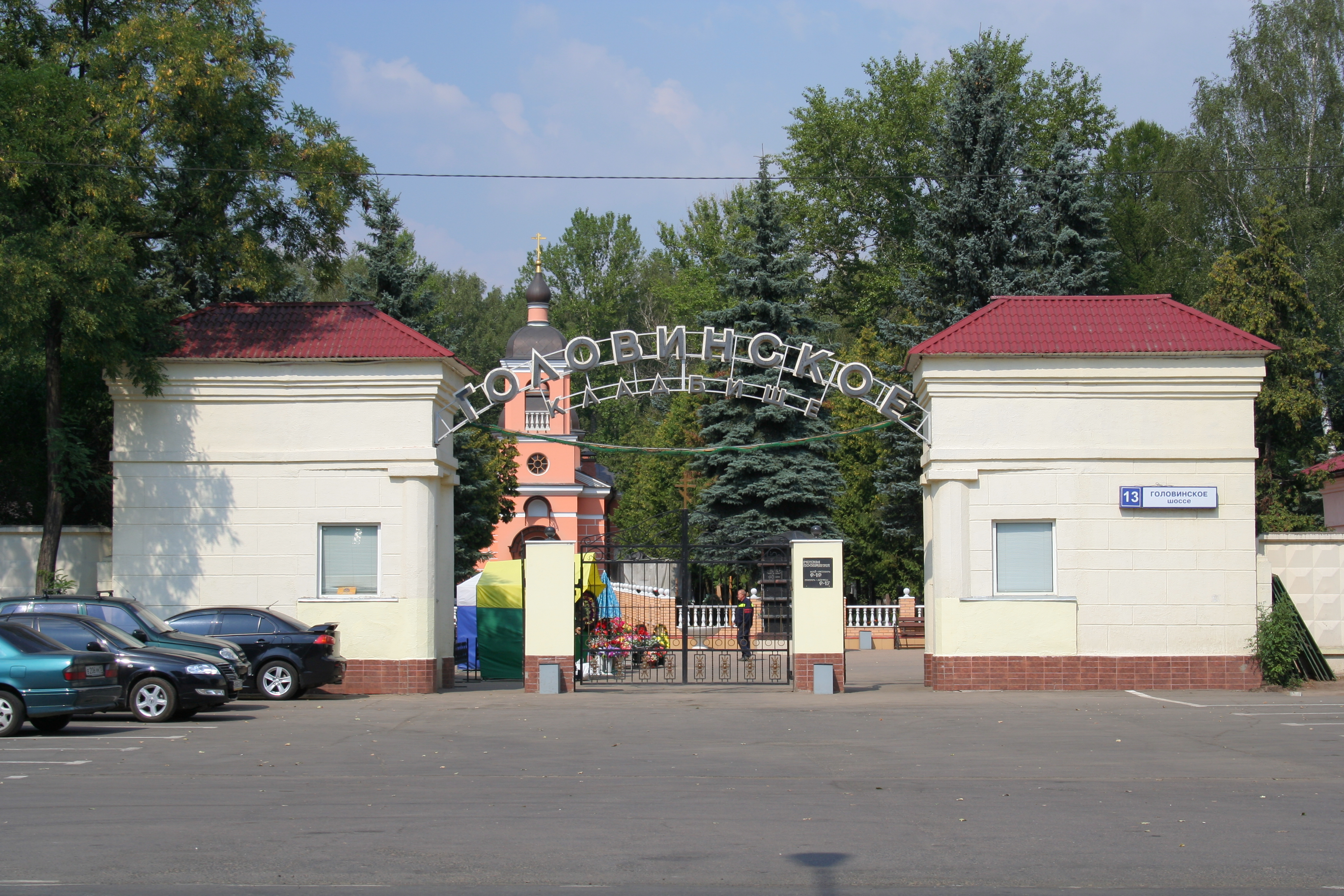
- Interactive map of Golovinskoye Cemetery

Details
- Established: 1951
- Location: Khovrino District, Moscow
- Country: Russia
- Coordinates: 55°50′17″N 37°30′04″E
- Size: 15 hectares (37 acres)

Golovinskoye cemetery (Russian: Головинское кладбище) is a cemetery in the Khovrino District, Northern Administrative Okrug in Moscow, Russia.

== History ==
It was founded in 1951 in the area of the former village of Golovino, from which it traces its name, on the site of the former garden of the Kazan Golovinsky Monastery. The area is 15 hectares.

On the territory of the cemetery, in the former ritual pavilion, a church was organized to honor the Holy Royal Martyrs and all the New Martyrs and Confessors of Russia. The church belongs to the Russian Orthodox Autonomous Church, which separated from the Russian Orthodox Church Abroad.
