= Timur and His Squad =

1940 children's novel by Arkady Gaidar

- First edition
- Author: Arkady Gaidar
- Original title: Тимур и его команда
- Language: Russian
- Genre: Children's literature
- Publisher: Detskaya Literatura, Moscow
- Publication date: 1940
- Publication place: USSR
- Media type: Print
- ISBN: 978-5-353-06022-2

Timur and His Squad (Russian: Тимур и его команда, romanized: Timur i yego komanda) is a short novel by Arkady Gaidar, written and first published in 1940. The book tells the story of a gang of village kids who sneak around secretly doing good deeds, protecting families whose fathers and husbands are in the Red Army, and doing battle against nasty hooligans. It had a huge impact upon the young Soviet audiences. Timurite movement (Timurovtsy), involving thousands of children, became a massive phenomenon all over the country. Timur and His Squad remained part of the curriculum in every Soviet school even up into the 1990s.

The short novel was adapted into two feature films, Timur and His Team (1940) by Aleksandr Razumny and Timur and His Team (1976) by Aleksandr Blank and Sergei Linkov.

== Background ==
The story of a boy who organizes his friends into a 'good gang', realizing its sense of adventure into an intricate, intelligent game the purpose of which is to help elders, support minors and fight a group of scoundrels who poison the village life, was evolving through the years, as a result of Gaidar's own social experiments of the kind, according to biographer F. Ebin. The semi-autobiographical nature of Timur and His Squad is corroborated by contemporaries, including Konstantin Paustovsky, who, as his son grew seriously ill and was in urgent need of a rare medication, found himself a witness to a quick quasi-military operation in the course of which Gaidar (who was guesting at Paustovsky's house) made a telephone call, summoned the boys who lived in his house and nearby and sent this squad all through the city drugstores to deliver a drug needed in just some forty minutes. Paustovsky concluded: "'See, how well does my squad work?' Gaidar enquired, preparing to leave. To thank him was an impossible thing. He used to get very angry when people started thanking him. He considered helping people to be a thing as natural as saying hello or wishing one good health. No one'd be thanked for just wishing you good health, right?"

Author Ruvim Frayerman remembered:

Once, long before Timur and His Squad had been started Gaidar, said to me: "Why do you think all through the centuries boys were playing outlaws? Come to think of it, outlaws are baddies who rightly deserve punishment. But children are perceptive. Playing outlaws, what they did in effect, was dramatizing the idea of freedom, expressing man's historic longing for it. In the old times rebellion was a protest against the lack of freedom in a society. But the Soviet children live through a time, the likes of which humanity's never known. They won't be playing outlaws fighting kings' men anymore. They'd rather play the kind of games that would help Soviet soldiers fight international outlaws.

=== History ===
Gaidar started writing the book in December 1939. Having published by this time two scripts, "Voyennaya Taina" (The War Secret) and "Sudba Barabanshchika" (The Drummer's Fate), he was seeing Timur and His Squad as another scenario. In summer 1940 the film of the same title was shot and released to become an instant success with the young audience. Its script was published for the first time in 1940's issues 7 and 8 of the Pioneer magazine.

Having finished the script, Gaidar started re-working the text into a serial novel, which was originally called "Duncan". The atmosphere of an impending war pervaded the book. On June 14, 1940, Gaidar wrote in a diary: "Today 'Duncan' got started, a small novel. The war raging all over the world - there's no more Norway, Holland, Denmark, Luxembourg, Belgium. The Germans are approaching Paris, and Italy joined the war one of these days." Soon the original title got reinstated. "Today finished the 'Timur' novel. It was mostly written in Moscow, in the course of the last two weeks," reads the August 27, 1940 diary entry.

On September 5, 1940, Pionerskaya Pravda newspaper started publishing 'Timur and His Squad' in serial form and continued to do so up until October the 8th. Simultaneously, All-Union Radio broadcast a radio drama version of the novel. In 1941 the novel was published in book form. The impact of it upon the young readership was immense. Children's 'squads' started to form all over the country. "Thousands and thousands of Soviet pioneers have followed Timur's initiative and are helping elders in their deadly fight with fascist scoundrels," Pionerskaya Pravda wrote on July 19, 1941.

== Plot summary ==
Daughters of the Red Army Colonel Alexandrov, Zhenya (13) and Olga (18) come from Moscow to their dacha in a village and find themselves amidst strange night time activities. In an old barn Zhenya discovers the headquarters of some mysterious organization. She meets Timur, whose Squad, consisting of several dozens of well-organized boys, perform charitable acts in a clandestine fashion. The Squad helps families of the Army officers and soldiers, supports elders and minors, and fights off some gang hooligans led by a boy named Kvakin. Timur's 'games' are causing much suspicion, on the part of Timur's uncle Georgy, among other people. "But tell me, what kind of games did you and your friends play when you were young?" – asks the boy. "Well, we were running, jumping about and climbed roofs too, but at least our games were simple and well-understood," Georgy responds.

Olga spots Timur talking to Kvakin and makes the conclusion that they are of the same ilk. Zhenya knows otherwise; she develops a strong feeling for Timur, the young leader who is honest, noble, brave and modest to the point of reticence. In a decisive battle between the two gangs Timur and his boys win out. Finally, in quite a dramatic fashion he helps Zhenya to meet her father who goes to the war, as does Georgy, now Olga's friend. "You live for other people, and people will respond in a kind," says Olga to Timur whom she now sees she totally misunderstood.
