= Repetitive visual stimulus =

Visual stimulus with distinctive property

A repetitive visual stimulus is a visual stimulus that has a distinctive property (e.g., frequency or phase). The stimuli are simultaneously presented to the user when focusing attention on the corresponding stimulus. For example, when the user focuses attention on a repetitive visual stimulus, a steady state visually evoked potential is elicited which manifests as oscillatory components in the user's electroencephalogram, especially in the signals from the primary visual cortex, matching the frequency or harmonics of that stimulus.

Repetitive visual stimuli are said to evoke a lesser response in brain cells, specifically superior collicular cells, than moving stimuli. Habituation is very rapid in healthy subjects in reference to repetitive visual stimuli. Development changes around the first year of life are attributed for attention control and these are said to be fully functional around the ages of two and four years old. This is the age that toddlers seem to now prefer moving and changing stimuli, much like healthy adults. In infants, there is evidence that supports the hypothesis that infants prefer repetitive visual stimuli or patterns, in comparison to moving or changing targets.
