= Chuk and Gek =

1939 short story by Arkady Gaidar

- Cover of Chuk and Gek (2007) in Russian, by ACT
- Author: Arkady Gaidar
- Original title: Чук и Гек
- Translator: Leonard Stocklitsky (English)
- Illustrator: Adrian Yermolayev
- Language: Russian
- Genre: Children's literature
- Publisher: Detgiz Publishers; Progress Publishers, Moscow
- Publication date: 1939
- Publication place: Union of Soviet Socialist Republics
- Media type: Print

Chuk and Gek (Russian: Чук и Гек) is a 1939 Russian short-story written by Soviet children's writer Arkady Gaidar. It was adapted as a film in 1953, directed by Ivan Lukinsky, and again in 2022.

== Publication history ==
Arkady Gaidar started working upon the story in December 1938. It was first serialized by Pionerskaya Pravda in January 1939, then, under the title "Telegramma" (The Telegram) appeared in the No. 2, February 1939, issue of Krasnaya Nov magazine. Later that year it came out as a separate book (Detgiz Publishers, illustrations by A Yermolayev), with considerable changes made by the author and under the new title "Chuk i Gek". In 1940 the story was included into Gaidar's Detgiz compilation Rasskazy (Short Stories).

== Summary ==
In Soviet Moscow, brothers Chuk and Gek Seriogins live with their mother while their father is away in Siberian taiga for geological research. As the New Year closes in, Mr. Seriogin, longing to see his wife and children, sends a telegram asking them to come over. After making a very long and eventful train journey and a two-day journey through taiga on a horse sled, they arrive to find that their father and his team of geological researchers are not at the base.

The guard returns from hunting and announces that the geological research team is gone for a ten-day trip to Alkarash Gorge and he himself will be absent for two days. While the three can stay in the guard's hut, he has no keys to the main houses or the storage. Chuk, Gek and their mother must now survive the next ten days in this wilderness all by themselves, with only the meagre supply that they have brought with them. All ends well, as the team returns and the family is reunited. They celebrate the New Year together before the mother and the children have to return to Moscow.
