= Viktor Dragunsky =

Soviet children's writer

Viktor Yuzefovich Dragunsky
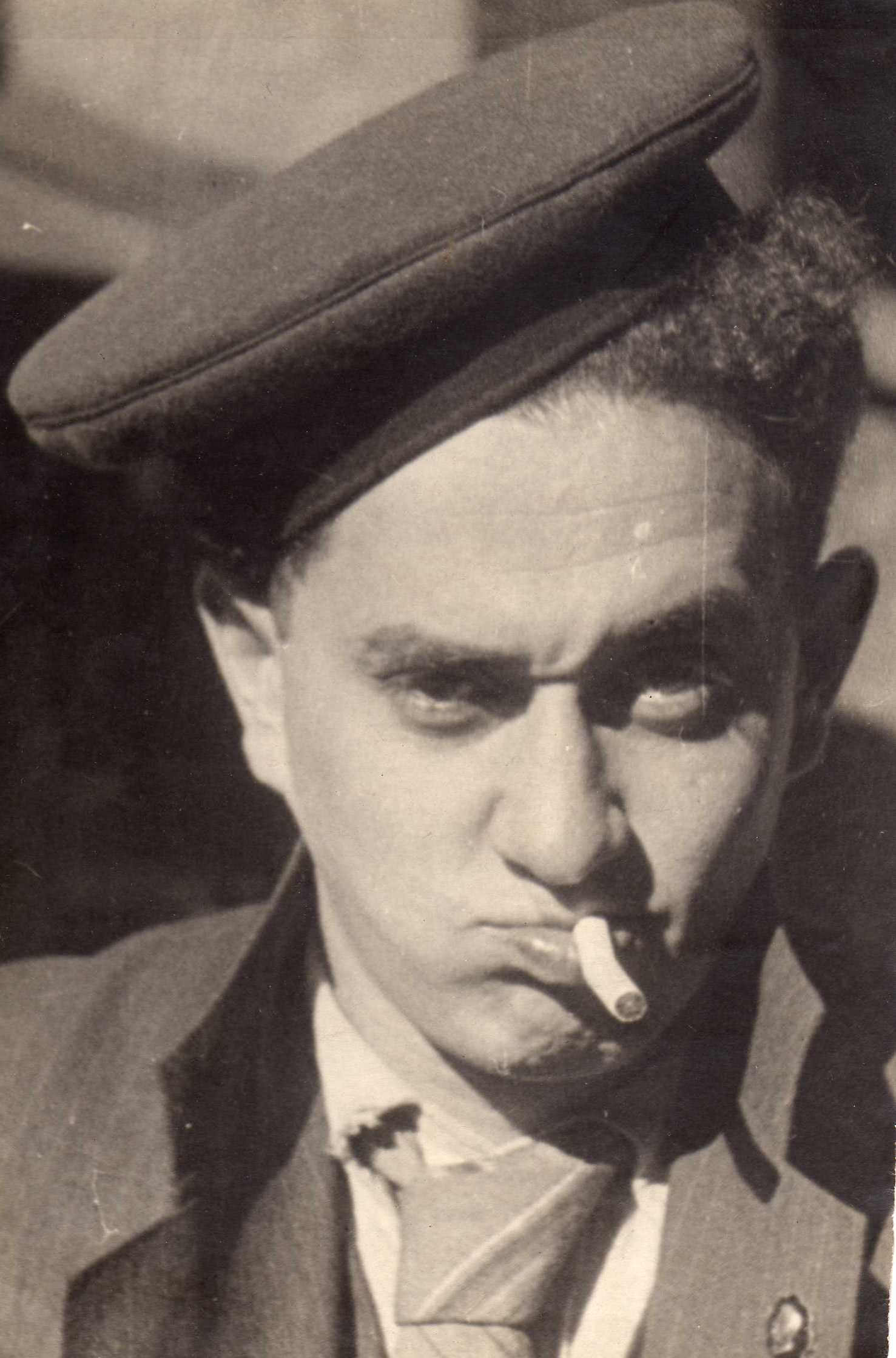
- Born: 1 December 1913; New York City, United States
- Died: 6 May 1972 (aged 58); Moscow, Soviet Union
- Occupation: Writer

Viktor Yuzefovich Dragunsky (Russian: Виктор Юзефович Драгунский; 1 December 1913 - 6 May 1972) was a Soviet writer. He was born into a Jewish family who emigrated to the United States from Gomel, Belarus. The family returned to Gomel in 1914. He is best known for The Adventures of Dennis, a series of children's stories.
