= Moscow Country Club =

Golf club in Russia

- Interactive map of Moscow Country Club
- 55.862°N 37.205°E

Club information
- Location: Nakhabino, Russia
- Established: 1994; 32 years ago
- Operator: Moscow Country Club
- Total holes: 18
- Tournaments: Russian Open
- Website: www.moscowcountryclub.ru
- Designed by: Robert Trent Jones, Jr.
- Par: 72
- Length: 7,154 yd (6,542 m)

The Moscow Country Club is a golf club in Russia.

== Golf ==
The idea of building a championship golf course in Russia, dates back to the early 1970s when leaders of the Russian Government invited American executive Armand Hammer to Russia to find out what Russia needed to entice Western business. Hammer answered "limousines and a golf course".

A protocol on US assistance for a Soviet golf course was signed in 1988 by Armand Hammer and the UpDK of the USSR Ministry of Foreign Affairs (now GlavUpDK under Russia's MFA). The signing happened at the Gorbachev–Reagan summit in Moscow on June 1, 1988.

The course building began in 1988; Jones invited Antti Peltoniemi, a Finnish golf course contractor he’d worked with previously, to join the project the following year, in part because he could import a needed bulldozer.The club has an 18-hole, 7,015 yard championship golf course designed by Robert Trent Jones, Jr. The European PGA endorsed the club. Since its opening in 1993, the Moscow Country Club has become the permanent venue for a number of major golf competitions, including the Russian Open, the country's first professional golf tournament. Moscow Country Club has been the venue for European Tour event, the Russian Open since its inauguration, and also hosts the annual President of Russia Golf Cup.

To celebrate the course opening, a nine-hole tournament took place in 1993. It was exclusively for Russians, to ensure that the first champion was a native. The inaugural Russian Open championship, a 54-hole event, took place in September 1994 featuring a wide range of professional and armature talent. Today, the course is now a semiprivate club which has more than 400 members.
