= Pioneer (Russian magazine) =

- Editor: Benyamin Ivanter (1933–1938); P.K. Shary (1938–1941); Natalya Ilyina (1941–1971); Stanislav Furin (1971–1986); Anatoly Moroz (1986–present)
- Frequency: Monthly
- First issue: March 1924
- Based in: Moscow, USSR/Russian Federation
- Language: Russian

Pioneer (Russian: Пионер) is a Soviet/Russian monthly magazine originally published by the Central Council of the All-Union Leninist Young Communist League and All-Union Pioneer Organisation, for schoolchildren aged 10–14.

== History ==
Pioneer magazine was founded in Moscow in 1924. The first issue of it came out on March 15, and was devoted entirely to Vladimir Ilyich Lenin. It became a rarity, since the lead was written by Lev Trotsky, and several years later most of the printed copies were for that reason destroyed.

The early Pioneer featured articles by Nadezhda Krupskaya, Mikhail Kalinin, Yemelyan Yaroslavsky, poems by Samuil Marshak and Sergey Mikhalkov, short stories by Arkady Gaidar, Lev Kassil, Veniamin Kaverin, Agniya Barto, Boris Zhitkov, Konstantin Paustovsky among many others. Later among contributors were Zoya Voskresenskaya, Maria Prilezhayeva, Eduard Uspensky.

The magazine had its own science and technology features, sports and arts pages, and held arts and literature competitions. In 1974 it was awarded the Order of the Red Banner of Labour. In 1975 its circulation reached 1.5 million, then in 1986 another record was set at 1,860,000 (issues 4–7). After perestroika the magazine changed drastically, its popularity waned. As of March 2015, its circulation was 1,500.
