= The Adventures of Dennis =

Book by Wiktor Jusefowitsch Dragunski

- Cover of the 1966 edition
- Author: Viktor Dragunsky
- Language: Russian
- Genre: Short story collection, children's fiction
- Publication date: 1961

The Adventures of Dennis (Russian: Денискины рассказы, Deniskiny rasskazy) is a collection of short stories for children written by Soviet author Viktor Dragunsky. They deal with the life of an eight-year-old boy in Moscow in the late 1950s and 1960s, modelled on the author's son. The first story was written in 1959; by 1961 a collection was published as a book. The total number of stories is about a hundred.

The stories show a wide range of tone, with Dragunsky mixing the poetic, the satirical and the sentimental. A 1999 review in the New Zealand Slavonic Journal describes the stories as "beautifully written" and offering "a rich psychological profile of Russian children".

The Adventures of Dennis were popular in India, where they were available in English and Marathi translations. One reason for their popularity was that they were more relatable when compared to English children's literature. In 2016 they were for the first time translated directly from Russian into Hindi and Marathi.
