= Ruvim Frayerman =

Soviet writer, poet, essayist and journalist

Ruvim Isayevich Frayerman
- Born: 22 September 1891; Mogilyov, Russian Empire
- Died: 28 March 1972 (aged 80); Moscow, USSR
- Writing career
- Period: 1924–1970s
- Genres: Fiction, poetry, memoirs, travel writing
- Subjects: Children's literature, historical and ethnographical essays
- Notable work: Wild Dog Dingo (1939)

Ruvim Isayevich Frayerman (Руви́м Иса́евич Фраерма́н, 22 September 1891, in Mogilyov, Russian Empire, – 28 March 1972, Moscow, USSR) was a Soviet writer, poet, essayist and journalist. A major component of the Socialist romanticism, Frayerman is best remembered as a children's literature author, whose novel Wild Dog Dingo or the Tale of the First Love (1939) became a popular Soviet film in 1962.

== Biography ==
Ruvim Isayevich Frayerman was born in Mogilyov, to a poor Jewish family. In 1916 he enrolled into the Kharkov Technological Institute. A year later, as he was taking industrial practice in the Russian Far East the 1917 Revolution broke out. Frayerman joined the Red partisan unit fighting the Japanese troops nearby Nikolayevsk, then as a commissar travelled through Siberia, helping to maintain the Bolshevik rule in the regions inhabited by Tungus, Nivkh and Nanai people. Having settled in Yakutsk, he joined the staff of the local Lensky Kommunar newspaper.

Yemelyan Yaroslavsky, whom Frayerman met in Novosibirsk, invited him to join the newly formed Sibirskiye Ogni (Lights of Siberia) magazine, where his first short novel Ognyovka was published in 1924, followed by Na Mysu (At the Cape, 1925), Sobolya (Sables, 1926) and a large poem Na Rassvete (At the Dawn, 1926). Many of Frayerman's works of the time – notably, Vaska-Gilyak (1929), Afanasy Oleshek (1933) and The Misfortunes of An-Senen (1935) – dealt with the life of the native peoples of Siberia, whom the author formed strong bonds with. In 1939 Frayerman published his best-known novel Wild Dog Dingo or the Tale of the First Love (Dikaya Sobaka Dingo ili Povest o Pervoy Lyubvi). The film with the same name shot in 1962 by Yuli Karasik has been seen by 21.8 million people.

As the Great Patriotic War broke out, Frayerman joined the Red Army volunteer corps. In January 1942 he was seriously injured and in May demobilized. In 1946 his novel Long Sea Voyage (Dalneye Plavaniye) came out, followed by The Life and Extraordinary Adventures of Captain-Lieutenant Golovkin (1948, with P.Zaykin as a co-author), a biography turned into a thriller. Among Frayerman's later books were Children's Best-Loved Author (Lyubimy Pisatel Detei, 1954, on Arkady Gaidar) and A Test for Soul (Ispytanye Dushi, 1966), the collection of sketches and essays.

Ruvim Frayerman died on 28 March 1972 in Moscow. He was buried at the Pyatnitskoye Cemetery.
