= R.V.S. =

1926 novel by Arkady Gaidar

- Author: Arkady Gaidar
- Original title: Р.В.С.
- Language: Russian
- Genre: Children's literature
- Publisher: Gosizdat, Moscow
- Publication date: 1926
- Publication place: Union of Soviet Socialist Republics
- Media type: Print

R.V.S. (Russian: Р. В. С.) is a short novel by Arkady Gaidar, first published in 1926, in the Perm-based newspaper Zvezda (issues 83–97) which the author worked as the correspondent of at the time. Also in 1926 it was released as a separate book by Gosizdat Publishers. This was only the 2nd published work by Gaidar and his first one addressed to the young readership. The book's title is an abbreviation of Revvoyensovet ("Revolutionary Military Council").

== Summary ==
A small Ukrainian village is caught in the middle of the Russian Civil War turmoil, the Reds (Bolsheviks), the Whites (the White Army) and the Greens (the anarchists, the nationalists, the SRs) ousting each other in quick succession. Two boys, Dimka and Zhigan, discover an injured Red Army officer in an old barn and start helping him with food and medicine. Anticipating the inevitable enemy onslaught, they manage to bring a Red Army Unit in to rescue the injured man who happens to be a Revvoyensovet commander (his personal R.V.S.-stamped blank given for boys to serve as a password).
