= Arkady Gaidar =

Soviet children's writer (1904–1941)

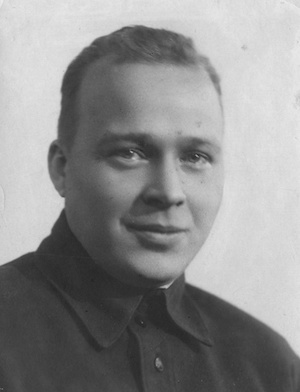

Arkady Petrovich Gaidar (Russian: Арка́дий Петро́вич Гайда́р, born Golikov, Russian: Го́ликов; 22 January [O.S. 9 January] 1904 – 26 October 1941) was a Russian Soviet writer, whose stories were very popular among Soviet children, and a Red Army commander.

== Biography ==
Gaidar was born in the town of Lgov, Kursk Governorate, Russian Empire (now in Kursk Oblast, Russia), to a family of teachers of Russian aristocratic descent. Through his noble mother, he was a distant relative of Mikhail Lermontov, whose 2nd great-grandfather was also Gaidar's mother's direct ancestor. In 1912, the family moved to Arzamas where in 1914 Arkady enrolled in a local secondary school. In 1917, as an ardent 13-year-old Bolshevik follower, Gaidar started to distribute leaflets and patrol the streets. During one such mission, he received his first wound, a stab in the chest.

In 1918, Golikov applied for Communist Party membership and started working for the local newspaper Molot as a correspondent. In August 1918, he became a party member and in December volunteered for the Red Army, having lied about his age. In January 1919, Golikov went to the front as a Special Unit commander's adjutant, to fight what Soviet biographies referred to as the 'kulak gangs'.

Fresh from the 7th Moscow Red Commanders' courses, Gaidar went to the Ukrainian (later Polish) front as a company commander. In December 1919, injured and shell-shocked, he was demobilised, but in March 1920 returned to the Red Army, to the Caucasian Front's 9th Army, 37th Kuban Division, as a company commander again. In summer 1920, Gaidar took part in operations against the units of generals Geyman and Zhitikov.

In 1921, Gaidar participated in the suppression of several anti-communist uprisings, among them Antonovshchina where he allegedly killed many innocent local residents in brutal ways and suffered nightmares afterwards as a result. Gaidar's biographer, Kamov, has since debunked these accusations of brutality. In 1922, he was moved to the Mongolian border (where the Red Army was fighting White Army units led by colonels Oliferov and Solovyov), but later that year he was hospitalised with traumatic neuroses. He retired from the army in 1924 due to a contusion.

As the Great Patriotic War broke out, Gaidar was sent to the front as a special correspondent for the newspaper Komsomolskaya Pravda. In the fall of 1941, Gaidar and other soldiers were surrounded by German troops. He joined the partisans and became a machine gunner. On 26 October, Gaidar was killed in combat near the village of Lipliave. He was buried in the town of Kaniv.

== Literary work ==
In 1925, Gaidar's debut novel In the Days of Defeats and Victories was published, followed by Life For Nothing and The Mystery of a Mountain, a sci-fi novel and, most notably, R.V.S. (1925) which formed a blueprint for his career as a children's writer, telling stories of front-line camaraderie and the romanticism of the revolutionary struggle. In 1927, Gaidar moved to Moscow. A year later, he went to Arkhangelsk to work for a local newspaper, Pravda Severa. Back in Moscow, in 1930, he published the novel School (originally titled "The Plain Biography"). In the early 1930s, several articles on Gaidar's works appeared in the Soviet press, Konstantin Fedin being his major supporter and mentor. In 1939, Gaidar was awarded the Order of the Badge of Honour. Short stories "The Military Secret" (1935), "The Blue Cup" (1936) and the novel Blue Stars (1939) were followed by his most famous work, Timur and His Squad (1940), its hero named after, and partially based on the character of, the author's son. A captivating account of an altruistic pioneer youth gave birth to the mass Timur movement among Young Pioneers and other children's organisations all over the Soviet Union.

A number of films were made based on his stories. Gaidar's books have been translated into many languages.

=== Novels ===
- In the Days of Defeats and Victories (ru:В дни поражений и побед), short version: 1925, full: 1926
- R.V.S. (РВС) (the Russian abbreviation refers to "Revolutionary Military Council"), 1925
- Life for Nothing (ru:Жизнь ни во что), 1926
- Forest Brothers (Лесные братья), 1927
- School (Школа), 1930
- Distant Countries (Дальние страны), 1932
- Military Secret (Военная тайна), 1935
  - The novel incorporates as a story within a story the earlier published fantasy tale (skazka) A tale about a war secret, about the boy Nipper-Pipper, and his word of honour (ru:Сказка о Военной тайне, о Мальчише-Кибальчише и его твёрдом слове, 1933), where Nipper-Pipper (Malchish-Kibalchish) has become a signature literary child hero in the Soviet Union.
- "The Blue Cup" (ru:Голубая чашка), 1936
  - Moscow: Raduga Publishers, 1988. ISBN 5-05-002177-4
- The Drummer's Fate (Судьба барабанщика), 1939
- Blue Stars (1939)
- "Smoke in the Forest" (Дым в лесу), 1939
- Chuk and Gek (Чук и Гек), 1939
- Timur and His Squad (Тимур и его команда), 1940

=== English translations ===
- Timur and his Gang, Charles Scribner's Sons, NY, 1943.
- School and Other Stories, Progress Publishers, Moscow, 1967.
- The Blue Cup, Progress Publishers, Moscow, 1981.
- Selected Stories, Raduga Publishers, Moscow, 1986.
- The Drummer Boy and Two Other Stories, Hutchinson's Books for Young People, London, 1947.
- Chuk and Gek, Progress Publishers, Moscow, 1973.

== Recognition and remembrance ==
Gaidar was awarded two orders and several medals.

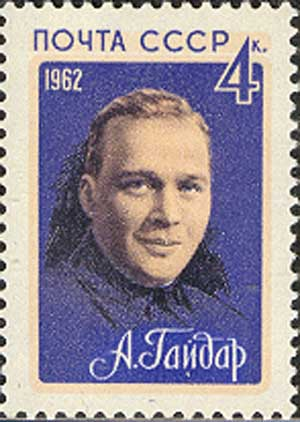
Arkady Gaidar on a Soviet stamp

A monument honouring him was erected in Kaniv in 1953.

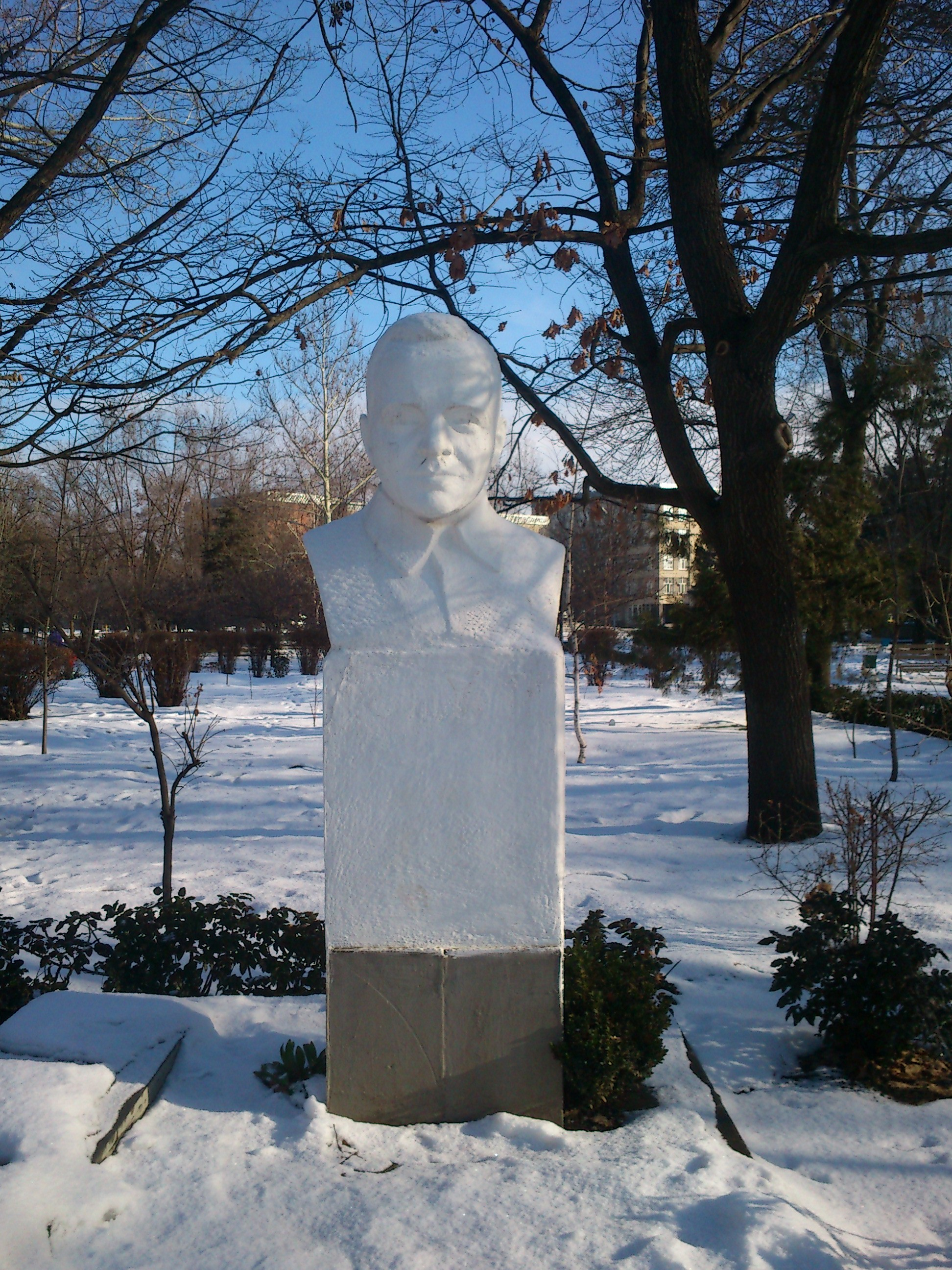
Monument to Gaidar in Svetlograd

Three biographical movies about Arkady Gaidar were released in the USSR: Serebryanye truby (Russian: Silver Trumpets) (1970), Konets imperatora taygi (Russian: The Death of the Taiga Emperor) (1978), and Ostayus s vami (Russian: I'll Stay with You) (1981). The latter was a story of Arkady Gaidar's last days.

== Pseudonym ==
Arkady's son, Timur Gaidar published two versions of the pseudonym's origin:

1. This an abbreviation of French "Golikov Arkady d ' Arsamas", which means "Golikov, Arkady from Arzamas".
2. Arkady took the name Gaidar from a Khakas language word meaning going first, the leader. Another version is that the name comes from the Khakas word for "Where is?" which is the question Gaidar would shout as he and his unit went from village to village in the Yenisei River region tracking down (and eventually killing) the Cossack hetman he was pursuing during the Civil War.

== Family ==
Arkady Gaidar's father, Pyotr Isidorovich Golikov, a teacher (after the 1917 Revolution a Red Army commissar), came from a working-class family. His mother, Natalya Arkadyevna Golikova (née Salkova), also a teacher (after the Revolution a doctor), was a daughter of a Tsarist Army officer. Arkady was the first of the couple's four children. His three sisters were Natalya, Olga and Yekaterina.

The Russian economist Yegor Gaidar was Arkady Gaidar's grandson. Yegor Gaidar's father, Rear Admiral Timur Gaidar, was his son.

Maria Gaidar (born 1982), Russian activist, is a daughter of Yegor Gaidar.
