= House of Chetao =

Circassian noble house

House of Chetao Чэтао Лъэпкъ
- Circassian knightly house
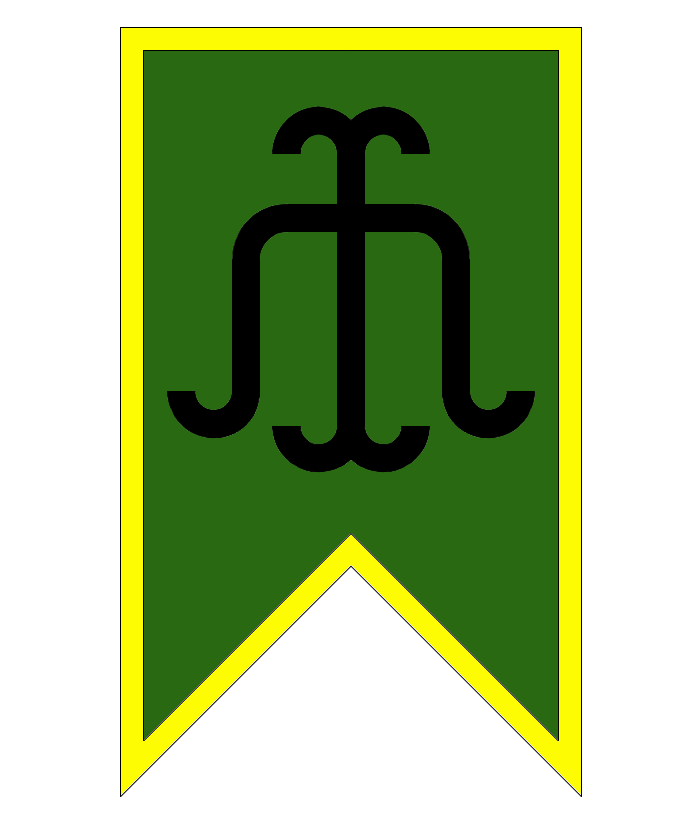
- Country: Circassia (formerly); Russian Empire (formerly); Mountainous Republic of the Northern Caucasus (formerly); Soviet Union (formerly); Confederation of Mountain Peoples of the Caucasus(formerly); Russia; Turkey; Syria; Jordan; Iraq
- Etymology: Chetao (Чэтао), meaning "swordsman" in Circassian
- Origin: Abzakhia, Circassia (present-day Republic of Adyghea and Krasnodar Krai, Russia)
- Founded: Unknown
- Members: Günay Çetao Kızılırmak
- Traditions: Khabzeism; Christianity; Sunni Islam

House of Chetao (also referred to as Chetaw) (Adyghe: Чэтао Лъэпкъ, Russian: Читао, Turkish: Çetaw Sülalesi, Çetav Sülalesi or Çetao Sülalesi) is a Circassian knightly house of Abzakh tribe of Circassia. They are found in Republic of Adygea and Krasnodar Krai, Russian Federation; as well as in Republic of Turkey, Syrian Arab Republic, Hashemite Kingdom of Jordan and Republic of Iraq due to Circassian genocide in present day.

There are three main claims about the former place of residence of Chetao House: Tube (Nowadays Tuby), Mezmay, and Khidizh (nowadays Khadyzhensk).

== Etymology ==
Chetao (Чэтао), meaning "the one who bears the sword" or "the one who utilises the sword" or simply "swordsman" in Circassian, suggesting that the founder of the house had an exquisite skill in swordsmanship.

== Notable members ==
- Günay Çetao Kızılırmak: An author who was born in 13th of February 1981, in the Republic of Turkey, who was awarded the "Book Translation of the Year" award by Dünya Kitap Magazine in Turkey, due to her translation of Chevengur by Andrei Platonov into Turkish language. She moved to the Republic of Adygea in Russian Federation in 1994, at the age of 13 and lived there for 13 years until moving back to Turkey in 2007. She studied Russian language and literature when she was in Russia, thus she translated or contributed to the translation of many Russian books into Turkish language such as Happy Moscow, The Return, The Foundation Pit and Chevengur by Andrei Platonov, У войны не женское лицо War Does Not Have a Woman's Face by Svetlana Alexievich, Dead Souls by Nikolay Vasilyevich Gogol, Three Deaths by Lev Nikolaevich Tolstoy and Underground by Vladimir Makanin She is living in Ankara, Turkey as of 2013.
