= Chevengur =

Novel by Andrei Platonov

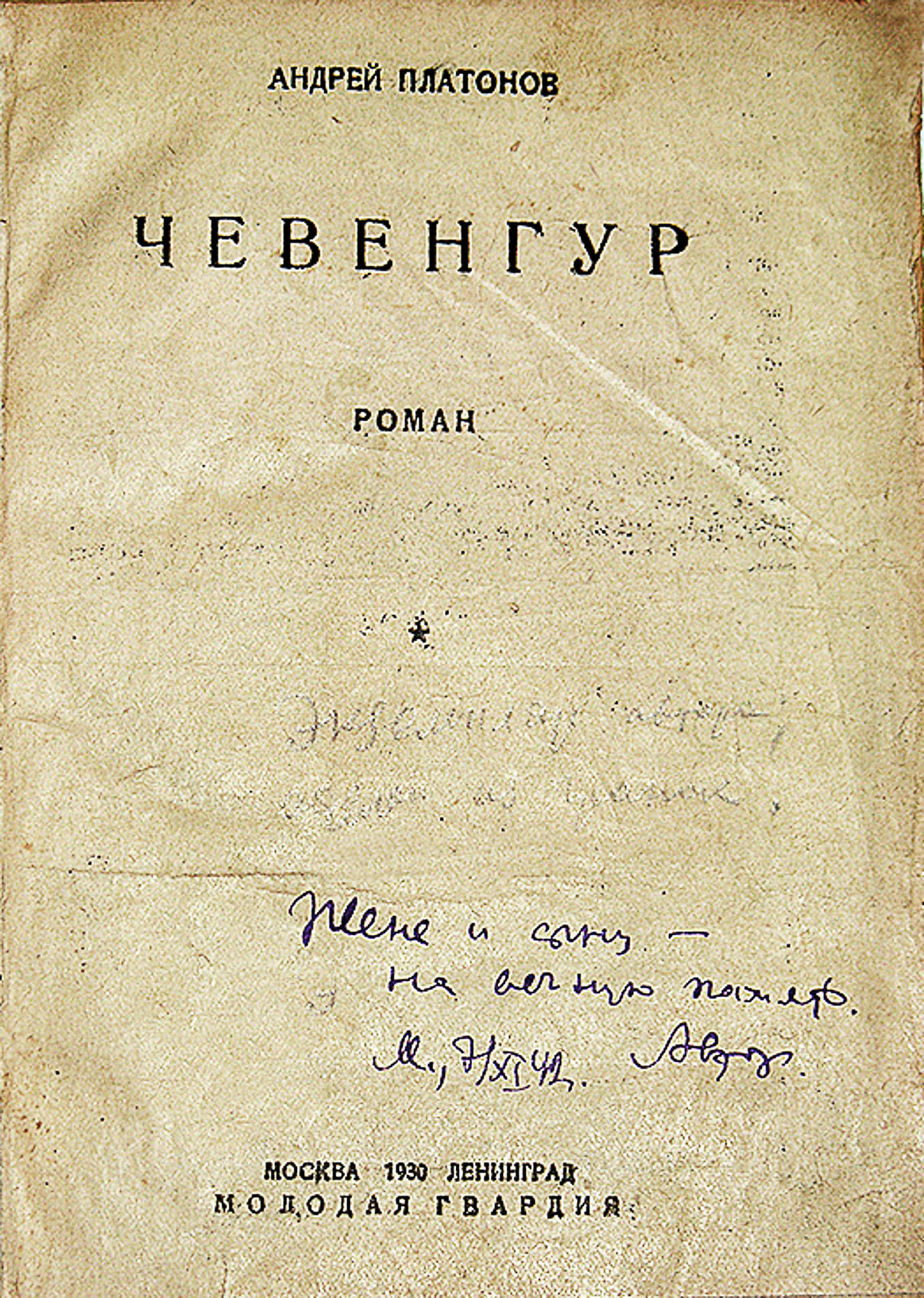
- Author: Andrei Platonov
- Original title: Чевенгур
- Language: Russian
- Publisher: Krasnaya Nov, Ardis
- Publication date: 1928, 1929 (fragments); 1972 (full text)
- Publication place: Soviet Union
- English publication date: 1978

Chevengur (Russian: Чевенгур) is a socio-philosophical novel by Andrei Platonov, written in 1928. It is his longest work and often regarded by scholars as the most significant of his works. Although its fragments were published in the Soviet magazine Krasnaya Nov, the novel was banned in the Soviet Union until 1988. Full text of the novel was published by Ardis in 1972.

The novel was first translated into English in 1978 by Anthony Olcott.

According to N. Poltavtseva, there is reason to speak of a "philosophical trilogy", which includes the novels Chevengur, The Foundation Pit and Soul.

== Title of the novel ==
There are various interpretations of the title of the novel. The word, according to its protagonist, "sounded like the enticing hum of an unknown country." "A whole book can be written about the decoding of this toponym".

Sergey Zalygin and Nina Malygina associate it with the words "cheva", meaning a scrap, the remains of a worn-out bast shoe, and "gur", meaning noise, roar, howl. G. F. Kovalev and O. Yu. Aleinikov give an interpretation that takes into account the predilection of that era for all sorts of revolutionary and institutional abbreviations: "CheVeNGUR" as in "Extraordinary military invincible (independent) heroic fortified area."

Literary critics and scholars generally locate the fictional space of "Chevengur" in the Southern Russia steppes, south of the Voronezh and Belgorod regions, while some interpretations claim it's an area specifically near the real city of Boguchar.

== Plot ==
The novel takes place somewhere in the south of Russia and covers the late 1910s early 1920's period of war communism and the New Economic Policy, although real events and the area have been transformed in accordance with the logic of the myth. Alexander Dvanov, the main character of the novel, has been orphaned early by his father, who drowned himself out of curiosity for the afterlife. His adoptive father Zakhar Pavlovich somewhat resembles the writer's father (at the same time, the image of Alexander is partly autobiographical).

"At seventeen, Dvanov still had no armour under his heart - no faith in God, no other mental peace ...". Going “to look for communism in the initiative of the populace”, Alexander meets Stepan Kopenkin - a wandering knight of the revolution, a kind of Don Quixote whose Dulcinea becomes Rosa Luxemburg. Kopenkin saves Dvanov from a paramilitary gang of anarchists. Eventually, the heroes of the novel find themselves in a kind of communist reserve - a town called Chevengur.

Residents of the city are confident in the advent of the communist Paradise. They refuse to work (with the exception of Subbotniks, on which they move all the houses and trees in the town), leaving this prerogative exclusively to the Sun; they eat animal feed, resolutely implement community of wives, and cruelly deal with bourgeois elements (destroying, Platonov emphasizes, both their body and soul). The revolutionary process in Chevengur is led by the fanatic Chepurny, Alexander's half-brother Prokofiy Dvanov "with the makings of a grand inquisitor", the romantic executioner Piyusya and others.

In the end, the city is attacked by either the Cossacks or the Cadets; in a fierce battle, the defenders of the commune show themselves as true epic heroes and almost all die. The surviving Alexander Dvanov rides Kopenkin's horse Strength of the Proletariat to the lake where his father died and drowns himself to reunite with his father. Only Prokofy remains alive, "weeping on the ruins of the city among all the property he inherited".

== Ideological origins ==
As in other works of the writer, in Chevengur one can feel Platonov's acquaintance with the ideas of Nikolai Fyodorov, Alexander Bogdanov, V. V. Rozanov, Konstantin Tsiolkovsky, Albert Einstein, Z. I. Vernadsky, A. L. Chizhevsky, Georgy Gurdjieff and Otto Weininger. In addition, the novel is seen as a reflection of the theories of Tommaso Campanella and Joachim Floorsky, the worldview of peasant writers of the 1920s (A. Dorogoichenko, Fedor Panferov, I. Doronin, P. Zamoysky). Possible sources for the novel include the Victory Over The Sun by Alexei Kruchenykh and Velimir Khlebnikov.

== Interpretations ==
The novel is structured in such a way that allows for many different and even polar opposite interpretations: from anti-communist: “revolution is the coming to power of fools” to neo-Bolshevik: “justification of post-revolutionary horror by pre-revolutionary”. From the point of view of N. G. Poltavtseva, the novel can be viewed as "a story about the collapse of the myth of the first creation of the model of an ideal state." T. I. Dronova defines the content of the novel as a "conglomerate" of the ideologemes of communism and Christian apocalypticism.

The image of the protagonist, with his inherent purity and chastity, reflected Platonov's thoughts about Jesus Christ. Many motives and episodes of Chevengur are reminiscent of the Gospel

== Genre ==
As Leonid Yaroshenko points out

"Chevengur" is considered as a story (V. Vyugin), a menippea (M. Geller), a philosophical novel (L. Fomenko), an ideological novel (M. Zolotonosov), a tragic utopia (V. Svitelsky), an Epic poetry poetry (V. Vasiliev), dystopia (N. Poltavtseva, R. Galtseva, I. Rodnyanskaya); indicate the interaction in the same genre structure of utopian and dystopian tendencies (A. Kedrovsky, K. Isupov, N. Malygina). Other modifications of the novel were reflected in "Chevengur": "polyphonic novel" (N. V. Kornienko), "novel-myth", "novel of the formation of man", "novel-travel".

Maxim Gorky called Chevengur a "lyrical Satire"

== Publishing history ==
The text was sent by the author to the editor-in-chief of the publishing house Molodaya Gvardiya G. Z. Litvin-Molotov. who gave Platonov a number of instructions on the completion of the novel, and Maxim Gorky, in a letter dated September 18, 1929, stated: "Your novel is extremely interesting, its technical flaw is excessive stretching, an abundance of" conversation "and obscurity, blurred" action. At the same time, Gorky expressed great doubts about the prospects for the publication of the book - and he was right. Despite all the efforts of Litvin-Molotov, the novel, already brought to the galley proofs stage, was never published during the author's lifetime.

The publishing house Russian Association of Proletarian Writers also refused to print the novel. According to the memoirs of its employee I. S. Shkapa, when Platonov came to collect the manuscript, he said in anger:

Oh, you pathetic people! They pulled out your rectum, nailed it to the table with a golden nail and said: Get moving! You hedgers.

In 1928, the Krasnaya Nov magazine published excerpts from the novel: "The Origin of the Master" in No. 4 and "The Descendant of the Fisherman" in No. 6; the magazine Novyi mir - the story "Adventure" in No. 6. The story "The Origin of the Master" - "artistically, perhaps, the most perfect part of the novel" - was published in 1929 in the author's collection of the same name.

The continuation of the story - a fragment entitled "Traveling with an Open Heart" - was published in the Literaturnaya Gazeta in 1971 (issue dated October 6). In the same year, the magazine Kuban (No. 4) published another fragment entitled "Death of Kopenkin". In 1972, a French translation of the novel was published in Paris (titled Les herbes folles de Tchevengour) and with a foreword by Michel Heller; it, however, lacked the text of "The Origin of the Master". The Italian translation, published in the same year under the title: "Village of New Life" (Italian: Villaggio della nuova vita), was highly praised by Pier Paolo Pasolini. The first full publication of the novel in the West was in London (1978). In the USSR, the publication of the novel became possible only during the years of perestroika: in 1988, this task was fulfilled by the magazine Druzhba Narodov (No. 3-4); in the same year the novel was published as a separate edition and as a part of selected works collection.
