= Platonov =

Platonov or Platonova is a surname. It may refer to:

== People ==
- Andrei Platonov (1899–1951), pen name of Andrei Platonovich Klimentov, Russian writer of the Soviet period
- Denis Platonov (born 1981), Russian ice hockey player
- Dzmitry Platonaw (born 1986), Belarusian footballer
- Igor Platonov (1934–1995), Ukrainian-Soviet chess grandmaster
- Oleg Platonov Russian writer
- Pavel Platonaw (born 1986), Belarusian footballer
- Sergey Platonov (1860–1933), Russian historian who led the official St Petersburg school of imperial historiography
- Viacheslav Platonov (1939–2005), Russian volleyball player and coach
- Vladimir Petrovich Platonov (born 1939) Russian-Belarusian mathematician
- Yuriy Platonov (born 1945), psychologist
- Yuriy Mihailovich Platonov, mayor of Rîbnița in Transnistria, Moldova

== Play ==
- Platonov (play), by Anton Chekhov
