= Yuriy Platonov =

Yuriy Platonov may refer to:

- Yuriy Platonov (psychologist) (born 1945), Russian psychologist, rector of St. Petersburg State Institute of Psychology and Social Work
- Yuriy Platonov (politician) (born 1948), mayor of Rîbnița
