= Gulchatay =

Gulchatay, Gyulchatai, etc. (Russian: Гюльчатай) is a female given name. It may refer to:

- A character from the 1935 noven Soul by Andrei Platonov
- ru:Гюльчатай, a character in the 1970 film White Sun of the Desert
- A crater on Venus
- Gulchatay (TV series), Russian TV series
