= Mirra Ginsburg =

American writer (1909–2000)

Mirra Ginsburg (June 10, 1909 - December 26, 2000) was a 20th-century Jewish Russian-American translator of Russian literature, collector of folk tales and children's writer. Born in Bobruysk then in the Russian Empire she moved with her family to Latvia and Canada before they settled in the United States.

== Bibliography ==
=== Own works ===
- Kitten from One to Ten (1980) (Illustrated by Giulio Maestro)
- The Sun's Asleep Behind the Hill (1982) (Illustrated by Paul O. Zelinsky)
- Asleep, Asleep (1992) (Illustrated by Nancy Tafuri)
- Merry-Go-Round: Four Stories (1992) (Illustrated by Jose Aruego and Ariane Dewey)
- The King Who Tried to Fry an Egg on His Head (1994) (Illustrated by Will Hillenbrand)

=== Translations ===
- Mikhail Bulgakov. The Master and Margarita, 1967
- Mikhail Bulgakov. The Fatal Eggs, 1968
- Mikhail Bulgakov. Heart of a Dog, 1968
- Yevgeny Zamyatin, We, 1972
- Andrei Platonov. The Foundation Pit, 1973
- Fyodor Dostoevsky. Notes from Underground, 1974
