= St. Petersburg State Institute of Psychology and Social Work =

Coordinates: 59.9386°N 30.2747°E

- Санкт-Петербургский государственный институт психологии и социальной работы
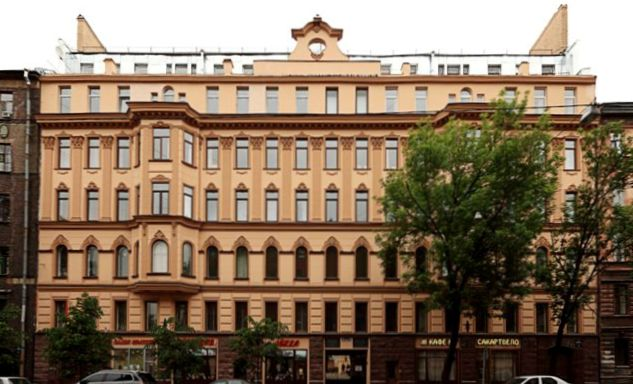
- Motto: Human dignity Professional competence Social accountability
- Type: Public
- Established: 1992
- Rector: Yuriy Platonov
- Administrative staff: 140
- Students: 1,259
- Location: 13A 12th Line, Vasilyevsky Island, 199178, (Russia) St. Petersburg, Russian Federation
- Website: www.psysocwork.ru

St. Petersburg State Institute of Psychology and Social Work (SPbGIPSR, Russian: Санкт-Петербургский государственный институт психологии и социальной работы, СПбГИПСР) is the only Russian state higher education institution of psychological and social profile in the Northwestern Federal District.

== Academic structure ==
As of December 2017, the Institute consists of Faculty of Psychological and Social Work (since 1995) and Faculty of Applied Psychology (since 1999) with a total of seven departments:

- Theory and Technology of Social Work
- Applied Social Psychology and Conflictology
- General, Developmental and Differential Psychology
- Counseling and Health Psychology
- Psychological Counseling
- Pedagogy and Psychology of Deviant Behaviour
- Philosophy, Cultural Studies and Foreign Languages
- Economics, Mathematics and Informatics

Academic structure also comprises the specialized Training and Laboratory Complex (TLC) designed to facilitate the practice-oriented approach in student's training. TLC consists of 6 laboratories and 4 classes:

- Art-Workshop Studio
- Center of Computer Technologies
- Psychological Counseling Studio
- Psychological Practice Center
- Psychophysiology Lab
- Music Therapy Studio
- Physical Education Center
- Individual Counseling Class
- Training and Methodology Class on
  Psychological and Social Work
- Civil Defense Class

== Higher Education ==
Bachelor's degree programmes
- 37.03.01 Psychology
- 39.03.02 Social Work "Social Work in the System of Social Services"
- 37.03.02 Conflictology

Master's degree programmes

- 37.04.01 Psychology "Psychological Counseling"
- 39.04.02 Social Work "Innovative Practices of Social Work"

All courses are delivered in the Russian language.

== Legal status ==
Institute operates under the university charter and internal regulations. It has license and state accreditation.

== See also ==
- Education in Russia
- List of universities in Russia
