= Andrei Platonov =

Russian author

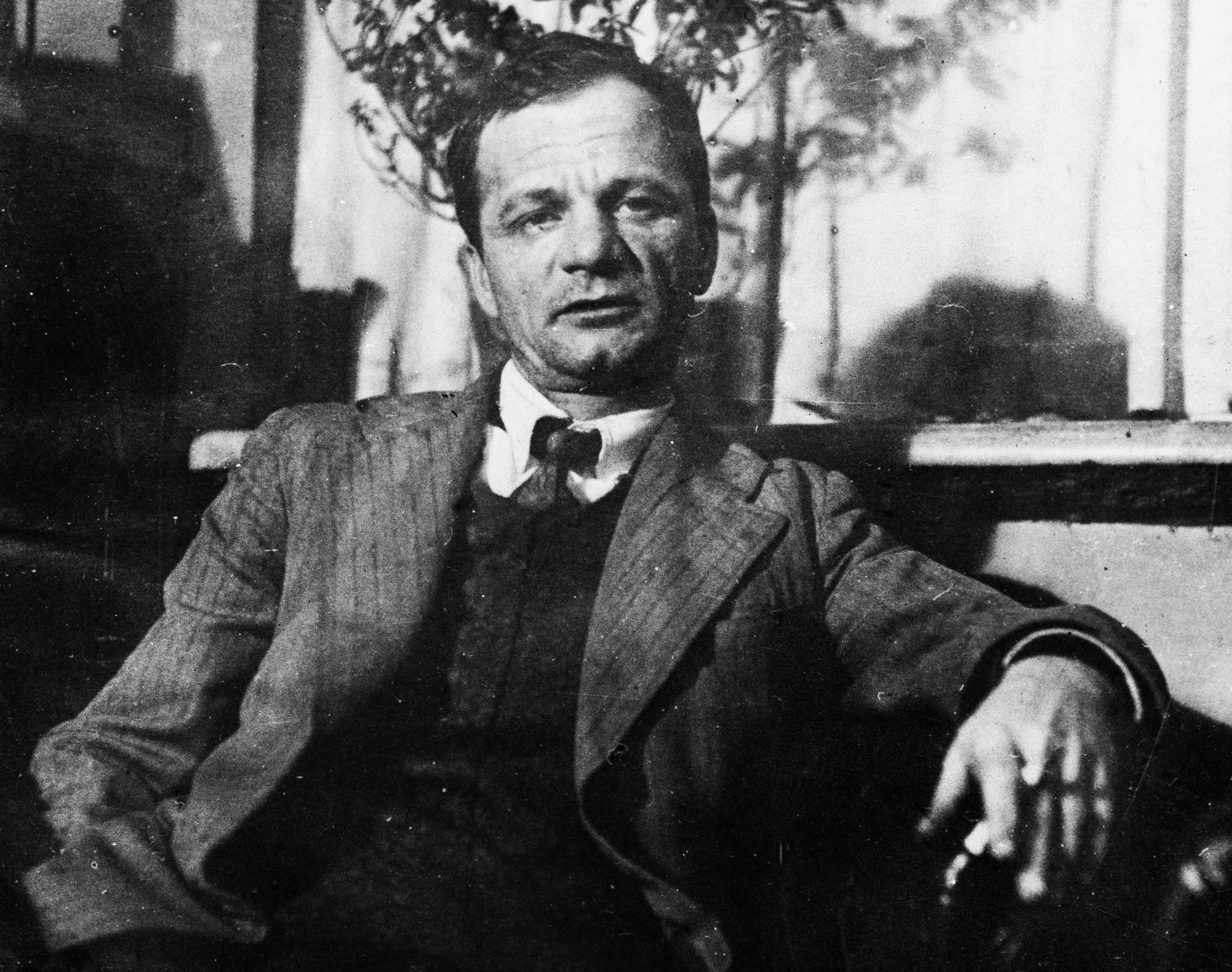
- Born: Andrei Platonovich Klimentov; 28 August 1899; Voronezh, Voronezh Governorate, Russian Empire
- Died: 5 January 1951 (aged 51); Moscow, Russian SFSR, Soviet Union
- Occupations: Novelist; philosopher; playwright; poet; engineer
- Writing career
- Period: 1919–1951
- Genres: Novel; short story; poetry; journalism
- Notable works: Chevengur; The Foundation Pit; Soul; "The Fierce and Beautiful World"; The Potudan River; "The Return"

Andrei Platonovich Platonov (Russian: Андрей Платонович Платонов, IPA: [ɐnˈdrʲej plɐˈtonəvʲɪtɕ plɐˈtonəf]; né Klimentov [Климе́нтов]; 28 August [O.S. 16 August] 1899 – 5 January 1951) was a Soviet Russian novelist, short story writer, philosopher, playwright, and poet. Although Platonov regarded himself as a communist, his principal works were banned until thirty years after his death because of their skeptical attitude toward collectivization of agriculture (1929–1940) and other Stalinist policies, as well as for their experimental, avant-garde form infused with existentialism which was not in line with the dominant socialist realism doctrine. His famous works include the novels The Foundation Pit (1930), Soul (1935) and Chevengur (1928).

== Early life and education ==
Platonov was born in the settlement of Yamskaya Sloboda on the outskirts of Voronezh in the Chernozem Region of Central Russia. His father was a metal fitter (and amateur inventor) employed in the railroad workshops and his mother was the daughter of a watchmaker. He attended a local parish school and completed his primary education at a four-year city school and began work at age thirteen, with such jobs as an office clerk at a local insurance company, smelter at a pipe factory, assistant machinist, warehouseman, and the railroad. Following the 1917 Revolution, he studied electrical technology at Voronezh Polytechnic Institute. When Civil War broke out in 1918 Platonov assisted his father on trains delivering troops and supplies and clearing snow.

== Early career ==
Meanwhile, Platonov had begun to write poems, submitting them to papers in Moscow and elsewhere. He was also a prolific contributor to local periodicals. These included Zheleznyi put ("Railroad"), the paper of the local railway workers' union; the Voronezh Region Communist Party newspapers Krasnaia derevnia ("Red countryside") and Voronezhskaia kommuna ("Voronezh commune"); and Kuznitsa, the nationwide journal of the "Smithy" group of proletarian writers.

From 1918 through 1921, his most intensive period as a writer, he published dozens of poems (an anthology appeared in 1922), several stories, and hundreds of articles and essays, adopting in 1920 the pen-name Platonov by which he is best-known. With remarkable energy and intellectual precocity, he wrote confidently across a range of topics including literature, art, cultural life, science, philosophy, religion, education, politics, the civil war, foreign relations, economics, technology, famine and land reclamation, and others. It was not unusual around 1920 to see two or three pieces by Platonov, on quite different subjects, appear daily in the press.

He was involved with the local Proletcult movement, joined the Union of Communist Journalists in March 1920, and worked as an editor at Krasnaia Derevnia ("Red countryside"), and the paper of the local railway workers' union. in August 1920, Platonov was elected to the interim board of the newly-formed Voronezh Union of Proletarian Writers and attended the First Congress of Proletarian Writers in Moscow in October 1920, organized by the Smithy group. He regularly read his poetry and gave critical talks at various club meetings.

In July 1920, Platonov was admitted to the Communist Party as a candidate member on the recommendation of his friend Litvin (Molotov). He attended Party meetings, but was expelled from the Party on 30 October 1921 as an "unstable element". Later, he said the reason was "juvenile". He may have quit the party in dismay of the New Economic Policy (NEP), like a number of other worker writers (many of whom he had met through Kuznitsa and at the 1920 writers' congress). Troubled by the famine of 1921, he openly and controversially criticized the behaviour (and privileges) of local communists. In spring, 1924 Platonov applied for re-admission to the Party, offering reassurance that he had remained a communist and a Marxist, but he was denied then as on the next two occasions.

In 1921 Platonov married Maria Aleksandrovna Kashintseva (1903–1983); they had a son, Platon, in 1922, and a daughter, Maria, in 1944.

In 1922, in the wake of the devastating drought and famine of 1921, Platonov abandoned writing to work on electrification and land reclamation for the Voronezh Provincial Land Administration and later for the central government. "I could no longer be occupied with a contemplative activity like literature", he recalled later. For the next years, he worked as an engineer and administrator, organizing the digging of ponds and wells, draining of swampland, and building a hydroelectric plant.

== Chevengur, The Foundation Pit and For Future Use ==
When he returned to writing prose in 1926, a number of critics and readers noted the appearance of a major and original literary voice. Moving to Moscow in 1927, he became, for the first time, a professional writer, working with a number of leading magazines.

Between 1926 and 1930, the period from NEP to the first five-year plan (1928–1932), Platonov produced his two major works, the novels Chevengur and The Foundation Pit. With their implicit criticism of the system, neither was then accepted for publication although one section of Chevengur appeared in a magazine. The two novels were only published in the USSR during the late 1980s.

In the 1930s, Platonov worked with the Soviet philosopher Mikhail Lifshitz, who edited The Literary Critic (Literaturny Kritik), a Moscow magazine followed by Marxist philosophers around the world. Another of the magazine's contributors was the theoretician György Lukács and Platonov built upon connections with the two philosophers. A turning point in his life and career as a writer came with the publication in March 1931 of For Future Use (″Vprok″ in Russian), a novella that chronicled the forced collectivisation of agriculture during the First Five Year Plan.

According to archival evidence (OGPU informer's report, 11 July 1931), Stalin read For Future Use carefully after its publication, adding marginal comments about the author ("fool, idiot, scoundrel") and his literary style ("this isn't Russian but some incomprehensible nonsense") to his copy of the magazine. In a note to the publishers, the Krasnaya nov monthly, Stalin described Platonov as "an agent of our enemies" and suggested in a postscript that the author and other "numbskulls" (i.e. the editors) should be punished in such a way that the punishment served them "for future use".

In 1933, an OGPU official Shivarov wrote a special report on Platonov. Attached were versions of The Sea of Youth, the play "14 Red Huts" and the unfinished "Technical Novel". The report described For Future Use as "a satire on the organizing of collective farms," and commented that Platonov's subsequent work revealed the "deepening anti-Soviet attitudes" of the writer.

== Official support and censure ==
In 1934, Maksim Gorky arranged for Platonov to be included in a "writers' brigade" sent to Central Asia with the intention of publishing a collective work in celebration of ten years of Soviet Turkmenistan. (Earlier that year, a collective work by over 30 Soviet writers had been published about the construction of the White Sea Canal.) Platonov’s contribution to the Turkmen volume was a short story titled “Takyr” (or “Salt-flats”) about the liberation of a Persian slave girl. Platonov returned to Turkmenistan in 1935 and this was the basis for his novella Soul (or Dzhan). Dzhan is about a “non-Russian” economist from Central Asia, who leaves Moscow to help his lost, nomadic nation called Dzhan, of rejects and outcasts possessing nothing but their souls. A censored text was first published in 1966; a complete, uncensored text only in 1999.

In the mid-1930s Platonov was again invited to contribute to a collective volume, about rail workers. He wrote two stories: "Immortality", which was highly praised, and "Among Animals and Plants", which was severely criticized and eventually published only in a heavily edited and far weaker version.

In August 1936, The Literary Critic published "Immortality" with a note explaining the difficulties the author had faced when proposing the story to other periodicals. The following year, this publication came under criticism in Krasnaya Nov, damaging Platonov's reputation. In 1939, the story was republished in the intended collective volume, Fictional representations of Railway Transport (1939) dedicated to the heroes of the Soviet railroad system.

Platonov published eight more books, fiction and essays, between 1937 and his death in 1951.

== Stalin's ambivalence and Platonov's son ==
Stalin was ambivalent about Platonov's worth as a writer. The same informer's report in July 1931 claimed that he also referred to the writer as "brilliant, a prophet". For his part, Platonov made hostile remarks about Trotsky, Rykov, and Bukharin but not about Stalin, to whom he wrote letters on several occasions. "Is Platonov here?" asked Stalin at the meeting with Soviet writers held in Moscow at Gorky's villa in October 1932 when the Soviet leader first called writers "engineers of the human soul".

In January 1937, Platonov contributed to an issue of Literaturnaya gazeta in which the accused at the second Moscow Show Trial (Radek, Pyatakov and others) were denounced and condemned by 30 well-known writers, including Boris Pasternak. His short text "To overcome evil" is included in his collected works. It has been suggested that it contains coded criticism of the regime.

In May 1938, during the Great Terror, Platonov's son was arrested as a "terrorist" and "spy". Aged 15 years old, Platon was sentenced in September 1938 to ten years imprisonment and was sent to a corrective labour camp, where he contracted tuberculosis. Thanks to efforts by Platonov and his acquaintances (including Mikhail Sholokhov), Platon was released and returned home in October 1940, but he was terminally ill and died in January 1943. Platonov himself contracted the disease while nursing his son.

During the Great Patriotic War (1941–1945), Platonov served as a war correspondent for the military newspaper The Red Star and published a number of short stories about what he witnessed at the front. The war marked a slight upturn in Platonov's literary fortunes: he was again permitted to publish in major literary journals, and some of these war stories, notwithstanding Platonov's typical idiosyncratic language and metaphysics, were well received. However, towards the end of the war, Platonov's health worsened, and in 1944 he was diagnosed with tuberculosis. In 1946, his last published short story, "The Return," was slammed in Literaturnaya Gazeta as a "slander" against Soviet culture. His last publications were two collections of folklore. After his death in 1951, Vasily Grossman spoke at his funeral.

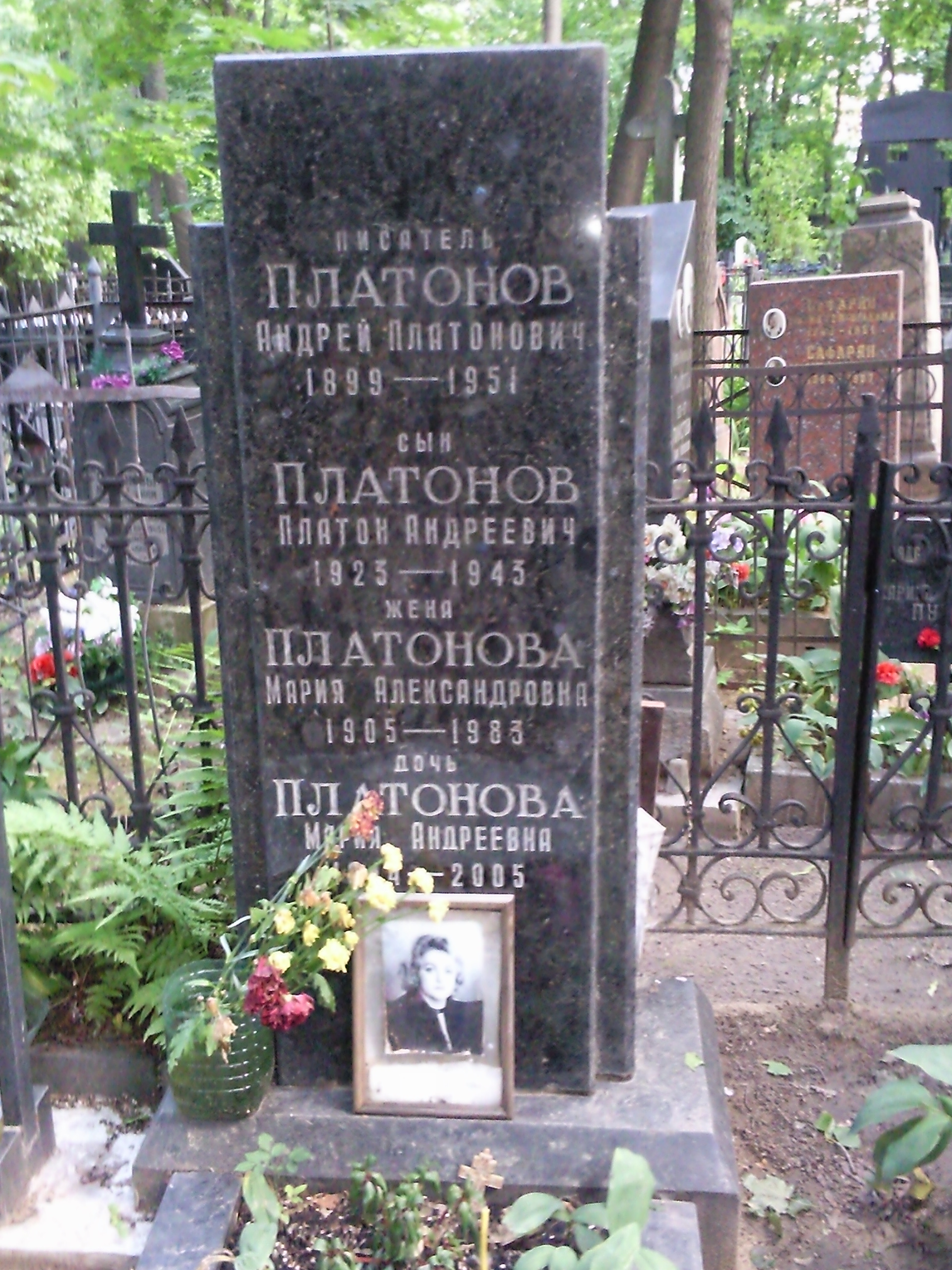
Andrei Platonov's grave at the Armenian Cemetery (Moscow)

== Legacy ==
Platonov's influence on later Russian writers is considerable. Some - but not all - of his work was published or republished during the 1960s' Khrushchev Thaw.

In journalism, stories, and poetry written during the first post-revolutionary years (1918–1922), Platonov interwove ideas about human mastery over nature with scepticism about triumphant human consciousness and will, and sentimental and even erotic love of physical things with fear and attendant abhorrence of matter. Platonov viewed the world as embodying at the same time the opposing principles of spirit and matter, reason and emotion, nature and machine.

He wrote of factories, machines, and technology as both enticing and dreadful. His aim was to turn industry over to machines, in order to "transfer man from the realm of material production to a higher sphere of life." Thus, in Platonov's vision of the coming "golden age" machines are both enemy and savior. Modern technologies, Platonov asserted paradoxically (though echoing a paradox characteristic of Marxism), would enable humanity to be "freed from the oppression of matter."

Platonov's writing, it has also been argued, has strong ties to the works of earlier Russian authors like Fyodor Dostoevsky. He also uses much Christian symbolism, including a prominent and discernible influence from a wide range of contemporary and ancient philosophers, including the Russian philosopher Nikolai Fedorov.

His Foundation Pit uses a combination of peasant language with ideological and political terms to create a sense of meaninglessness, aided by the abrupt and sometimes fantastic events of the plot. Joseph Brodsky considers the work deeply suspicious of the meaning of language, especially political language. This exploration of meaninglessness is a hallmark of existentialism and absurdism. Brodsky commented, "Woe to the people into whose language Andrei Platonov can be translated."

Elif Batuman ranked Soul as one of her four favorite 20th century Russian works. (Batuman is author of The Possessed: Adventures With Russian Books and the People Who Read Them and was Pulitzer Prize finalist for her novel The Idiot.)

Novelist Tatyana Tolstaya wrote, "Andrei Platonov is an extraordinary writer, perhaps the most brilliant Russian writer of the twentieth century".

Each year in Voronezh the literature exhibition is held in honour of Platonov, during which people read from the stage some of his works.

== Style and subject matter ==
One of the most striking distinguishing features of Platonov's work is the original language, which has no analogues in world literature. It is often called "primitive", "ungainly", "homemade".

Platonov actively uses the technique of ostraneny, his prose is replete with lexical and grammatical "errors" characteristic of children's speech.

Yuri Levin highlights Platonov's characteristic techniques:

- syntactically incorrect constructions, such as verb+place circumstance. «Think on head», «answered... from his dry mouth», «recognized the desire to live into this fenced-off distance».
- redundancy, pleonasm. «Voschev... opened the door to space», «his body was thin inside the clothes».
- extremely generalized vocabulary. "Nature", "place", "space" instead of specific landscape descriptions. «Prushevsky looked around the empty area of the nearest nature», «an old tree grew... in bright weather».
- active use of subordinate clauses about the cause (“Nastya ... hovered around the rushing men, because she wanted to”), as well as subordinate clauses about purpose (“It's time to eat for the day's work”). Moreover, they are often superfluous or logically unmotivated.
- active use of typical Soviet bureaucracies, often in an ironic way (“confiscate her affection”), but rarely.

According to the researcher Levin, with the help of these turns, Platonov forms a "panteleological" space of the text, where "everything is connected with everything", and all events unfold among a single "nature".

In the works of Andrey Platonov, form and content form a single, indissoluble whole, that is, the very language of Platonov's works is their content.

Among the key motives of Platonov's work is the theme of death and its overcoming. Anatoly Ryasov writes about Platonov's "metaphysics of death". Platonov in his youth came under the influence of Nikolai Fedorov and repeatedly refers to the idea of raising the dead. In the minds of his characters, it is associated with the coming arrival of communism.

== Tribute ==
Asteroid 3620 Platonov discovered in 1981 by Soviet astronomer L. G. Karachkina was named after Platonov.

== Works ==
=== Novels ===
- Chevengur – 1928 (1972)
- The Foundation Pit – 1930 (1969)
- Happy Moscow (unfinished) – 1933–1936 (1991)

=== Short fiction ===
- "The Motherland of Electricity" – 1926
- "The Lunar Bomb" – 1926
- Yepifan Sluices (novella) – 1927
- "Meadow Craftsmen" – 1928
- "The Innermost Man" – 1928
- "Che-Che-O" (Central Chernozem Oblast) - 1928, written together with Boris Pilnyak
- "The City of Gradov" - 1929
- "Makar the Doubtful" – 1929
- For Future Use (novella) – 1930 (1931)
- The Sea of Youth (novella) – 1934 (1986)
- Soul, or Dzhan (novella) – 1934 (1966)
- "The Third Son" – 1936
- "Fro" (short story) – 1936
- "Among Animals and Plants" (short story) – 1936
- "The Fierce and Beautiful World" – 1937
- The River Potudan (collection of short stories) – 1937
- "Immortality" – 1936, 1939
- "The Cow" – 1938 (1965)
- "Aphrodite" – 1945
- "The Return" or "Homecoming"– 1946

=== Other ===
- Blue Depths (verse) – 1922
- The Barrel Organ (play) – 1930
- The Hurdy Gurdy (play) – 1930 (1988)
- Fourteen Little Red Huts (play) – 1931 (1988)
- Father-Mother (screenplay) – 1936 (1967)

=== English translations ===
The short story collection The Fierce and Beautiful World, which includes his most famous story, "The Potudan River" (1937), was published in 1970 with an introduction by Yevgeny Yevtushenko and became Platonov's first book published in English translation. During 1970s, Ardis published translations of his major works, such as The Foundation Pit and Chevengur. In 2000, the New York Review Books Classics series republished The Fierce and Beautiful World with an introduction by Tatyana Tolstaya. In 2007, New York Review Books published a collection of newer translations of some of these stories, including the novella Soul (1934), "The Return" (1946) and "The River Potudan". This was followed by a new translation of The Foundation Pit in 2009, in 2012 by Happy Moscow, an unfinished novel (not published in Platonov's lifetime), and in 2023 a new translation of Chevengur.

- The Fierce and Beautiful World: Stories by Andrei Platonov, introduction by Yevgeny Yevtushenko, E. P. Dutton, 1970 (tr. Joseph Barnes)
- The Foundation Pit, a bi-langued edition with preface by Joseph Brodsky, Ardis Publishing, 1973 (tr. Mirra Ginsburg)
- Chevengur, Ardis Publishing, 1978 (tr. Anthony Olcott)
- Collected Works, Ardis Publishing, 1978 (tr. Thomas P. Whitney, Carl R. Proffer, Alexey A. Kiselev, Marion Jordan and Friederike Snyder)
- Fierce, Fine World, Raduga Publishers, 1983 (tr. Laura Beraha and Kathleen Cook)
- The River Potudan, Bristol Classical Press, 1998 (tr. Marilyn Minto)
- The Foundation Pit, Harvill Press, 1996 (tr. Robert Chandler and Geoffrey Smith)
- The Return and Other Stories, Harvill Press, 1999 (tr. Robert Chandler and Angela Livingstone)
- The Portable Platonov, New Russian Writing, 1999 (tr. Robert Chandler)
- Happy Moscow, introduction by Eric Naiman, Harvill Press, 2001 (tr. Robert Chandler and Elizabeth Chandler)
- Happy Moscow, introduction by Robert Chandler, New York Review Books, 2012 (tr. Robert Chandler and Elizabeth Chandler)
- Happy Moscow, introduction by Robert Chandler, Vintage Classics, 2013 (tr. Robert Chandler and Elizabeth Chandler)
- Soul, Harvill Press, 2003 (tr. Robert Chandler and Elizabeth Chandler)
- Russian Short Stories from Pushkin to Buida, Penguin Classics, 2005, (tr. Robert Chandler and others). Includes two important stories by Platonov: "The Third Son" and "The Return"
- Soul and Other Stories, New York Review Books, 2007 (tr. Robert Chandler with Katia Grigoruk, Angela Livingstone, Olga Meerson, and Eric Naiman).
- The Foundation Pit, New York Review Books 2009 (tr. Robert Chandler, Elizabeth Chandler and Olga Meerson).
- Russian Magic Tales from Pushkin to Platonov, Penguin Classics, 2012 (tr. Robert Chandler and others). Includes Platonov's subtle adaptations of traditional Russian folk tales.
- Fourteen Little Red Huts and Other Plays, Columbia University Press, 2016 (The Russian Library) (ed. by Robert Chandler; tr. by Robert Chandler, Jesse Irwin, and Susan Larsen; with notes by Robert Chandler and Natalya Duzhina)
- Chevengur, trans. Elizabeth Chandler and Robert Chandler (New York Review Books, 2023)
