= Soul (novel) =

Novella by Andrei Platonov

- Author: Andrei Platonov
- Original title: Джан
- Language: Russian
- Genre: Novella
- Published: 1935
- Publication place: Soviet Union

Soul or Dzhan (Russian: Джан, borrowed from Persian: جان (or jân), “meaning soul, vital spirit, dear life”) is a novella by Andrey Platonov. It was completed in 1935 by as a result of his second trip to the Turkmen Republic. Although the Soviet state in the 1930s censored Dzhan, and only published selected chapters, the uncensored text was finally published in full in 1999.

Soul could be read as a “typical socialist realist novel of the Stalinist era,” yet it contains elements that separate it from this categorization. In summary, it is the story of how Nazar Chagataev, a “non-Russian” economist from Central Asia, leaves Moscow and goes to bring socialism to his people called the Dzhan, a lost, nomadic nation made up of rejects and outcasts that possess nothing but their souls. Upon reaching the Dzhan, Chagataev realizes that he can do nothing to help the nation yet embarks on a perilous journey with them through the desert to the mountains before returning to Moscow at the end of the story. The majority of the story narrates the perilous migration of the Dzhan nation from the Sary-Kamysh delta through the Kara-Kum desert to the Ust-Yurt Mountains.

Geography plays an important role in this novella especially given the fact that Platonov as a Russian writer was an “outsider” in Central Asia writing from the perspective of an “insider.” The story takes place during the 1930s at the end of the national delimitation process that occurred in Central Asia from 1924-1936 that resulted in the formation of the Kazakh, Kyrgyz, Tajik, Turkmen, and Uzbek SSRs. Today the novel’s references to these specific geographical landmarks exist within the nations of Uzbekistan, Turkmenistan and Kazakhstan, respectively.

== Plot summary ==
The narrative starts with Nazar Chagataev’s graduation from the Moscow Institute of Economics. In the courtyard, he meets a woman named Vera and goes home with her that night. At her home, he sees an interesting diptych on her wall and learns that Vera is pregnant, but the father of the child is in the east, and has abandoned the family. He immediately fosters a strange connection to Vera and to her young daughter, Ksenya. After frequent visits, he decides marry Vera, but then leaves after the summer to go to his posting to “bring socialism” to his people and assist the Dzhan nation into a better life.

He sets off on a long journey by train across the steppe, by boat down the Amu-Darya, and finally reaches the Dzhan nation living in a delta called Sary-Kamysh. He meets Sufyan, Molla Cherkezov, Aidym and his mother, Gyulchatay, who immediately recognizes him, but is so careworn from her hard life treats him almost as a stranger. He sees that they are a sad, destitute nation living in a miserable state with very few possessions and little strength to live.

He returns briefly to Chimgay for supplies, and there he receives a letter from Ksenya stating that Vera and the baby have died. Although the news gives him sorrow, he decides that he must carry on his mission with the Dzhan. He returns to them and has a discussion with Nur-Mohammed who has been sent by the district executive committee to keep track of and assist the Dzhan. Although Nur-Mohammed has no hope in the nation, Chagataev decides they must migrate to a better location, hoping that this move with result in better living conditions for the group.

During this slow migration across the Kara-Kum sands, the group struggles to find sustenance and follows a fold of wandering sheep in hopes for food and direction. Some members of the nation die in the unforgiving sands. Chagataev slowly separates from the group as he falls behind and nearly dies from exhaustion and starvation. As he approaches death, he fights off two giant birds attacking him, shooting them with a pistol, and collapses into unconsciousness. Meanwhile, Nur-Mohammed stays with the group and in an act of desperation, intentionally separates from the group with Aidym. During a strange rape scene involving Nur-Mohammed, Aidym sees the giant birds fly overhead and hears the shots of Chagataev’s gun. She goes immediately to him and sees him unconscious.

Aidym quickly tries to comfort Nazar and restore his health. By this time, Nur-Mohammed comes back and once again tries to steal Aidym and take her to Afghanistan. Nazar tries to stop him and they get into a fight. The fight ends as Nazar shoots Nur-Mohammaed in the leg, and he runs off in to the sands never to be seen again.

After this scene, the nation has lost a few members, their spirits are low, and they decide to eat the birds that Nazar killed. They rest for some days, then continue onward to the Ust-Yurt Mountains. However, once they reach the mountains, only Nazar and Aidym work to keep a small group of sheep, build a small dwelling, and restore the health the remaining members. They work together to build adobe houses and properly settle in the Ust-Yurt Mountains.

However, soon after their health is restored many of the members disperse in all directions before the winter. Nazar stays the winter, then goes to Khiva and other cities to look for them. Chagataev decides that he must secure the well-being of the Dzhan nation and then return to Moscow. He meets another outcast, a young girl named Khanom, and he fosters an interesting relationship with her. They share some nights together, and he tells her to stay in the chaikhana until he returns.

Nazar goes to Chardzhou where he meets Sufyan. They continue around other cities such as Ashgabat, Bairam-Ali and Merv until he decides to return to Khiva, collect Khanom and go back to the mountains. When he returns, the owners of the chaikhana tell him that Khanom left to go look for him. He takes off quickly to the Ust-Yurt Mountains to see Aidym once more.

When he arrives, he sees that Khanom has made her way there along with other members of the nation. She has decided to stay and marry Molla Cherkezov. There is now a sufficient fold of sheep and other mud dwellings. Chagataev stays until the end of summer, but ultimately realizes that he is no longer needed. At the end of his stay, he advises the Dzhan to elect Khanom as the new leader. After everything seems in place, Nazar decides to take Aidym to school in Moscow and they both leave the Ust-Yurt Mountains and take the long journey.

When they return to Moscow, Ksenya and Aidym become friends. Ksenya helps Aidym adjust to the city life by taking her to the bathhouse, helping her get clothes and teaching her things about the city. The story ends as Ksenya and Nazar hold hands, and Nazar realizes that help can only come from others, not from himself.

== Main characters ==
Nazar Chagataev – His mother is Gyulchatay and his father was Ivan Chagataev, a Russian soldier in Khiva. His name, nazar, means “inner vision.” He is the protagonist or hero of the novella. He is a “non-Russian” economist from Central Asia, and he attempts to lead the Dzhan nation from the Sary-Kamysh delta to the Ust-Yurt Mountains before returning to Moscow.

Vera – She is a student in her final year at the Chemistry Institute. Nazar Chagataev meets her in Moscow and after frequent visits decides to marry her. She dies in childbirth, leaving Ksenya an only child.

Ksenya – She is the daughter of Vera. She suffers through her mother’s death and becomes an only child. She lives in Moscow and grows up to be a “real woman” who welcomes Nazar and Aidym at the end of the novella.

Gyulchatay – She is Nazar Chagataev’s Turkmen mother. She is an older member of the Dzhan nation.

Nur-Mohammed – He is a man sent by the district executive committee in Tashkent who does not belong to the Dzhan nation. He becomes the “villain” of the novel when he tries to steal Aidym and take her to Afghanistan.

Sufyan – He is one of the older, wiser members of the Dzhan nation. He gives frequent comments on the state and the status of the Dzhan.

Molla Cherkezov – He is a blind man and a member of the Dzhan. He marries Khanom at the end of the novel.

Aidym – She is the daughter of Molla Cherkezov. She is a teenage girl and one of the youngest members of the Dzhan nation. She suffers through various hardships such as rape, extreme poverty, and starvation, yet becomes a leader for which the Dzhan rely when they reach the Ust-Yurt Mountains. At the end of the novella, she returns with Nazar to Moscow to begin a new life.

Khanom – Her name, khanom, means “young woman” or “young lady.” She is a young woman that Nazar meets in Khiva. He spends some nights with her and convinces her to live with the Dzhan. She marries Molla Cherkezov and becomes one of the leaders of the Dzhan nation.

== Main themes ==
Andrey Platonov attempts to follow the “socialist realist” master plot through key examples such as Chagataev’s mission to “bring socialism” to the Dzhan so that they may become “happy, progressive, and numerous.” However, Platonov strays from the master plot in certain noticeable points such as Chagataev’s realization that he cannot help the group and decides to return to Moscow. The plot and characters of Dzhan seem to follow certain trajectories and exhibit the desire to add to socialist values of a Soviet society, yet they ultimately fall short. Thus, Platonov is unable to fit the mandated socialist realist framework, which results in the partial and delayed publication of this particular work.

In Dzhan, Platonov initially exhibits orientalist similarities in his texts through his depictions of Central Asian territory as useful, vast, and transformable, and Central Asia people as miserable, poor, and backwards. During his two trips to Central Asia, Platonov kept a record of his travels through his notes as well as letters to his wife and son. Through these notes and letters, we can also see his attempts to describe “the Turkmen” people as well as his efforts to make sense of his territorial surroundings in an orientalist fashion through his intentions to remake the society and transform the territory.

Scholars have noted how Platonov attempts to reflect his own reality through Soviet subjectivity in other works such as “Among Animals and Plants” and Happy Moscow. However, through the literary work of Dzhan, Platonov also illustrates Soviet subjectivity through his attempts to depict the “Soviet soul” within collective existence, his vision of ascent and enlightenment, his complicated understanding of narodnost’, his descriptions of homeless or abridged “Soviet people,” and his creation of “insider characters” in a region for which he is an “outsider.”

== Reception ==
Although Platonov repeatedly mentions Stalin throughout Dzhan in a fatherly and glorified way, Platonov’s vision and textual expression did not align with the personal views of Stalin or the mandates of the Soviet state in the 1930s. Scholars such as Chandler, Deathridge, Skakov, and Seifrid comment on the tumultuous relationship between Platonov and Stalin and the ways in which his coded language allowed him to survive the Great Terror of the 1930s. However, despite narrowly escaping trial and potential exile, Platonov’s textual representation of the “Soviet soul” and “socialist reality” set him directly against Stalin and Soviet Union seeking to categorize and sort “souls” that fit into their idea of the Soviet project.

During the 1930s, Andrey Platonov had many problems publishing his work. With the novella Dzhan, it was the same case. Platonov’s inability to fit the socialist realist model, his inclusion of graphic content, and his conflicting definitions of a “Soviet soul” ultimately resulted in the censorship of the novella. Although “brief extracts” from the first three chapters did appear in Literaturnaia Gazeta in 1938 and previous editions with “numerous omissions” were published from the 1960s to the 1990s, the “uncensored text” of Dzhan was not fully published until 1999.

== English translation ==
Soul was translated into English in 2003 by Robert and Elizabeth Chandler (published by Harvill Press). Shortly after in 2008, New York Review Books Classics issued a collection of Platonov's works translated into English by Robert and Elizabeth Chandler, Katia Grigoruk, Angela Livingstone, Olga Meerson, and Eric Naiman that included the novella Soul (Dzhan), the short story The Return, and six other stories.
