= Yuriy Platonov (psychologist) =

Russian academic (born 1945)

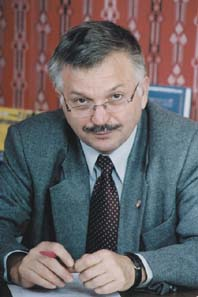

Rector of St. Petersburg State Institute of Psychology and Social Work
- In office 10 April 1992 – present

Personal details
- Born: 29 July 1945 (age 81)
- Education: Leningrad State University
- Profession: Professor, rector

Yuriy Platonov (Russian: Юрий Петрович Платонов; born 19 July 1945) is a Russian psychologist, professor and rector of St. Petersburg State Institute of Psychology and Social Work.

== Biography ==
Platonov was born on July 19, 1945, in Crimean Region, USSR. After graduating from the faculty of psychology of Leningrad State University in 1975 he continued to work at the university as a lecturer and head of the department. In 1992, by the initiative of Platonov, the City Administration of Saint Petersburg issued decree on establishing a new higher education institution, oriented at providing training in psychological and social work, which later became St. Petersburg State Institute of Psychology and Social Work. Platonov has since remained its rector.

== Honours and awards ==
- Honorary figure of Russian Higher Education
- Order of Honour (2006) - for the achievements in science and education, and for the years of diligent work.
- Order of Merit for the Fatherland 4th class (2011) - for the great achievements in science, education and training of qualified specialists.
- Vice-president of Saint Petersburg Psychological Society

== Selected publications ==
- Platonov Y.P. Psikhologicheskiye phenomeny povedeniya personala v gruppakh i organizatsiyakh: v 2kh tomakh. Tom 1. [Psychological phenomena of staff behavior in groups and organizations: in 2 vol. Vol.1]. St. Petersburg: Rech Publ., 2007. 416 p., in Russian, ISBN 978-592680578-6
- Platonov Y.P. Psikhoologiya konfliktnogo povedeniya [Psychology of conflict behavior]. St. Petersburg: Rech SPb., 2009. 544 p., in Russian
- Platonov Y.P. Geopolitika v pautine tekhnologiy vlasti [Geopolitics in the web of power technologies]. St. Petersburg: Rech Publ., 2010. 608 p., in Russian, ISBN 978-592680974-6
- Platonov Y.P. Tekhnologii vlasti: v 2kh tomakh. Tom 1. [Technology of power: in 2 vol. Vol.1]. St. Petersburg: Rech Publ., 2010. 576 p., in Russian, ISBN 978-592680961-6.
