= Yuriy Platonov (politician) =

Russian politician in Moldova (born 1948)

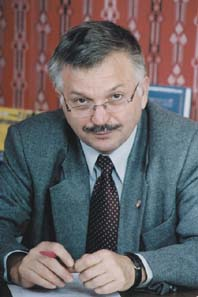
Yuriy Platonov

Yuriy Mihailovich Platonov (born 16 January 1948 in Klimkovo, Novgorod Oblast, Russia) is the mayor of Rîbnița, an industrial town in Transnistria, Moldova, and the head of the Rîbnița District administration.
