= The Foundation Pit =

Novel by Andrei Platonov

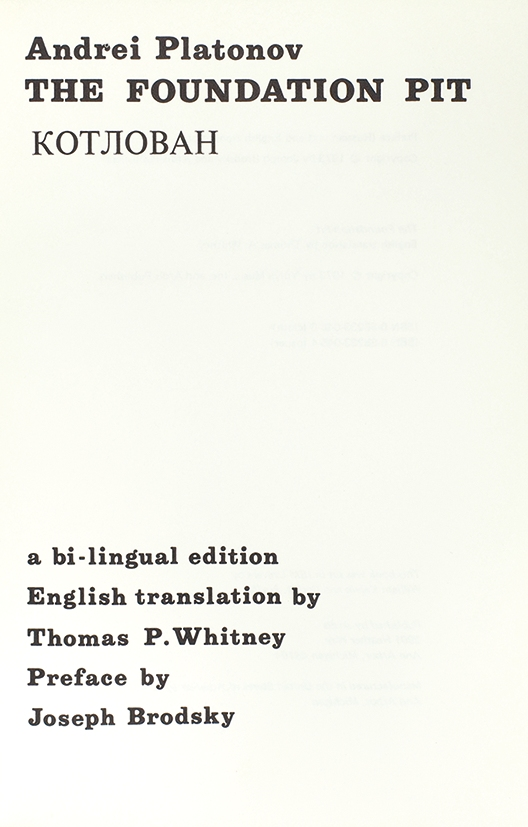
- First book edition. Bi-lingual edition with a preface by Joseph Brodsky. Ardis, 1973.
- Author: Andrei Platonov
- Original title: Котлован
- Language: Russian
- Genre: Modernist novel, philosophical novel, political novel, satirical novel
- Publisher: Grani / Student
- Publication date: 1969
- Publication place: Soviet Union
- English publication date: 1973

The Foundation Pit (Russian: Котлован, romanized: Kotlovan) is a symbolic and semi-satirical novel by Andrei Platonov. The plot of the novel concerns a group of workers living in the early Soviet Union. They attempt to dig out a huge foundation pit on the base of which a gigantic house will be built for the country's proletarians. As the novel progresses, the workers slowly cease to understand the meaning of their work, as the labor required to dig the pit saps their physical and mental energy.

In terms of creative works, Platonov depicted one of the first state-controlled dystopias of the 20th century. The novel is often compared to George Orwell's Nineteen Eighty-Four and Aldous Huxley's Brave New World. However, some critics say that The Foundation Pit cannot be regarded as a dystopian novel, as dystopian novels describe a catastrophic future, while Platonov's work describes the present, and the author's attitude cannot be called unambiguously critical.

Platonov's work is a representation of the conflict that arose between Russian individuals and the increasingly collectivized Soviet state in the late 1920s. Finished in 1930, the novel was not published in the Soviet Union until 1987 due to censorship.

The Foundation Pit is considered a modernist work. Joseph Brodsky wrote: "Platonov ... should be recognized as the first serious surrealist. I say - first, despite Kafka, because surrealism is by no means an aesthetic category, associated in our view, as a rule, with an individualistic worldview, but a form of philosophical fury, a product of the psychology of a dead end".

== Plot summary ==
Voschev, a machine factory worker, is berated by management for sitting around on the job. When asked why he stands idly for hours when he should be working, Voschev responds that he is trying to find the true meaning of life and that, if he succeeds, his happiness will raise productivity. They don't buy the excuse. Management asks rhetorically, "What if we all get lost in thought — who'll be left to act?" Voschev is subsequently fired. He leaves the factory in search of new work.

Along the way, Voschev comes across a couple fighting in front of their children. He yells at them for not respecting the ideals of youth, but they tell him to go away. He then sees a cripple named Zhachev, who Voschev thinks is about to harass a group of Pioneer girls. Zhachev responds, "I look at children for memory." He claims that Voschev is "soft in the head" due to never having been at war.

Eventually Voschev joins a group of workers, all of whom are much stronger than him, a fact that Voschev attributes to his exhausting quest for truth. He learns that the group will be digging an enormous foundation pit in which they will later construct a housing complex for the country's proletarians. Voschev also works at a slower pace than everyone else except for one man, Kozlov, whom the others make fun of for masturbating so often. Safronov, the most politically active worker at the foundation pit, complains when managements tells them to stop working for the day.

The group's supervisor quietly climbs out of bed in order to take a walk outside. His name is Prushevsky and, like Voschev, he feels that something is missing in his life. "People make use of me," he says to himself, "but no one is glad of me." He contemplates suicide but determines he will first write a letter to his sister.

Chiklin, a typical worker at the site, discovers a gully that he feels the group can use for the foundation pit without having to dig so far into the earth. However, Safronov condemns him for thinking outside of the box and asks whether he received "a special kiss in infancy" that allows him to make better decisions than the government's experts back in Moscow. Prushevsky orders the men to take soil samples, but, after they are returned to him, he sadly admits that he doesn't know anything about soil analysis because no one ever taught him how to look at the inside of things.

Prushevsky and Chiklin have a conversation about the days before the Russian Revolution. He tells Chiklin about a girl who spontaneously kissed him. She was the factory owner's daughter, and, while he regrets not stopping to talk to her, he's sure that she has grown old by now. Safronov and Kozlov begin to fight. Both claim that the other is trying to undermine the workers' goals, but Safronov leaves when Kozlov recalls the time he "incited a certain poor peasant to slaughter a cock and eat it."

Voschev continues to spend his days picking up leaves and other pieces of nature as proof that the world was created without purpose. He then recycles an old excuse, telling Safronov that he would like to take some paid time off in order to search for the meaning of life, which will increase productivity. Safronov counters that proletarians live for the enthusiasm to work. Chiklin walks through an old tile factory and finds Julia, the boss's daughter whom Prushevsky — and he, too, it is realized — kissed so many years earlier. She is about to die and is being taken care of by her daughter, Nastya. Julia tells her daughter to never reveal her family's wealthy origins, lest she be punished by class enemies. Chiklin kisses Julia one more time before she dies and then brings Nastya back to the barracks. He returns to the factory with Prushevsky, who does not recognize the dead woman. "I've always not recognized people I love," he explains, "though in the distance I’ve yearned for them." They leave her body in the room. Chiklin blocks the doorway with heavy bricks and tells Prushevsky that her death has given his life a new meaning.

All of the workers meet Nastya. Zhachev, the cripple at whom Voschev yelled during one of the opening scenes, decides that he will kill of the local adults once Nastya has grown up. Safronov asks Nastya about her family, and, remembering her mother's warning, she tells him that she waited a long time to be born in fear that her mother may belong to the bourgeoisie class. "But now that Stalin's become," she adds, "I've become too!" Safronov is pleased at this answer. When Nastya goes to sleep, the men resolve to start working early in the morning so that the housing complex will be completed for any other underage visitors in the future.

The next morning, the workers find 100 empty coffins buried in the ground. Chiklin gives two of them to Nastya, who sleeps in one and keeps her toys in the other. Yet a peasant named Yelisey tells the group that the coffins belong to his village. Yelisey carries away the coffins, which are tied together by a long strand of rope. Voschev follows the peasant's trail. Kozlov unexpectedly shows up at the worksite wearing an expensive suit, the result of having been appointed chairman of the labor union council. Pashkin, who is now Kozlov's driver, tells the group that the peasants in a nearby village are looking to collectivize their farms. The workers decide that Kozlov and Safronov, even though they hate each other, will lead the collectivization process.

The workers complete the foundation pit and are happy about the success. Pashkin tells them that it will have to be at least four times bigger in order to make room for pregnant women, though, and he convinces management to give the order. Voschev, who followed the peasant claiming ownership of the empty coffins, returns to the worksite to announce that Kozlov and Safronov are dead. The workers steal Nastya's empty coffins and bury the men in them. She doesn't understand why someone who is not alive is given preference. "It's the way things are done," Chiklin explains to her. "The dead are all special — they're important people."

Chiklin and Voschev travel to the village in order to retrieve the bodies but discover that Kozlov and Safronov have been brutally murdered. The peasants say that they do not know who murdered the men. Chiklin kills one of them out of anger, and a second peasant turns up dead under suspicious circumstances. A union organizer known only as “the activist” tells everyone that the latter peasant was the murderer. They bury Kozlov and Safronov before receiving a letter from Prushevsky, who says that Nastya has begun attending nursery school. Nastya's working class rhetoric, which she first used in order to fit in, is now violent in nature. She writes, "Liquidate the kulaks as a class. … Greetings to the collective farm, but not the kulaks."

The activist rounds up all of the peasants but is terrified to make a mistake. He has not received any mandates from management and is worried about both underachieving and overachieving, fearing that the peasants will use smaller animals like goats in order to prop up capitalism. Chiklin and Voschev find an old man lying on the ground. He is trying to will himself to death, claiming that his soul disappeared when his horse was taken into collectivization. They leave for a literacy class taught by the activist, who teaches women and young girls how to write socialist words and slogans. Chiklin finds out that the local priest has been providing the activist with a list of names of the people who enter the church to pray. He punches the priest on principle.

A few days later, the activist announces that the kulaks will be exterminated as a class, and then their bodies will be sent down the river on a makeshift raft. Many peasants were expecting this to happen and stopped taking care of themselves long ago. One woman, for instance, is alive only to the pain she feels when stray dogs chew on her feet. Others rip their plants out of the ground by the roots, refusing to let their property be taken into collectivization. The rest of the peasants spend the night involuntarily vomiting.

Zhachev and Nastya visit the village, and Yelisey introduces them to the local blacksmith: an anthropomorphic bear who touts a keen ability to sniff out and kill kulaks. The bear takes Nastya and Chiklin hunting for the kulaks who were not liquidated. Before dying, one of their victims shouts out, "The only person who’ll ever reach socialism is that one important man of yours." They send the last of the corpses down the river and set up speakers for music and dancing. Zhachev isn't having a good time and keeps knocking peasants onto the ground for fun. He tells Chiklin, who begins feeling sorry for the people they've killed, that Marxism, along with scientific advancements, will resurrect Lenin one day.

In the early morning, the bear inexplicably begins to hammer away at iron. He's roaring loudly, almost as if in song, and no one understands why. However, the men join him and, in essence, lose themselves in the hard work. Prushevsky does not follow suit. A girl asks him to teach her knowledge, and he leaves the worksite with her. The activist receives a letter from the Soviet government stating that any peasants who seem too willing to have their property collectivized should be treated with suspicion as undercover agents.

Nastya wakes up with a cold. She mutters about spiritual complexities similar to those of Voschev. Chiklin drapes three coats over her body for warmth, but the activist, still upset about the intelligence letter from management, steals one of them from her. Zhachev tells Chiklin about the aforementioned letter, and Chiklin becomes suspicious of the activist's optimism and energy. Chiklin kills him with a sledgehammer. The activist's body is sent down the river like the kulaks were. The bear begins to weep, feeling isolated from the group. Voschev explains the bear feels that way because he has no purpose in life except to work. Nastya's condition is also worsening. "Bring me Mama's bones," she continues to say. "I want them." The workers decide to bring her back to the worksite. Prushevsky, however, stays in the village in order to teach the children. Nastya dies the next morning.

Voschev returns to the worksite with all of the collectivize property, including its previous owners. He doesn't know how to react to Nastya's death but tells Chiklin that the peasants would like to enroll as regular workers. They realize this means that the foundation pit will have to be built even larger. Zhachev, who at the beginning of the novel vowed to kill all of the adults at Nastya's coming of age, refuses to help reconstruct the foundation pit. "Communism's something for the kids," Zhachev says. He leaves the worksite and never returns.

Chiklin spends 15 hours digging a grave for Nastya in order to ensure she will be disturbed by neither worms nor human beings. The bear reaches out and touches Nastya one last time.

== Main characters ==
- Voshchev — Protagonist who is introduced in the novel immediately after being fired from a machine factory. Management claimed he did not work hard enough. He arrives at the foundation pit with the same work ethic problem. Voshchev has a soft spot in his heart for children and does not believe they have a bright future in the Soviet Union.
- Safronov — Most politically active worker at the foundation pit. He opposes the time limits that management places on workers’ schedules and condemns other workers' attempts to contribute anything other than manual labor to the project. Safronov also dislikes Voschev's necessity for truth. He deeply hates Kozlov.
- Prushevsky — Supervisor who, like Voshchev, feels that he does not understand the meaning of life. He contemplates suicide due to this feeling and spends one night sleeping in the barracks with regular workers.
- Pashkin — Chairman of the local trade union. He frequently urges the group to work harder and later brings in former bureaucrats to pick up the slack. Pashkin once went through a long court trial in which his patriotism and ethnicity, specifically due to the name of his father, Leon Ilych, were questioned.
- Kozlov — Worker who deeply hates Safronov and whom others make fun of for masturbating under the covers at night. He recites memorized quotations and slogans in order to instill fear in villages and to climb the ranks within the local trade union.
- Chiklin — Worker who feels no guilt about killing a random peasant while searching for the murderer of Safronov and Kozlov.
- Nastya — Daughter of Julia. She is brought to live with the workers and is treated as a special guest. She feigns loyalty to Vladimir Lenin, keeping the promise to her mother that she would not reveal her family roots.
- Julia — Mother of Nastya. She makes Nastya promise not to reveal her wealthy roots, lest she be punished as a member of the upper class. Julia is the woman who kissed Chiklin many years earlier.
- Activist — Unnamed organizer who maintains a great deal of enthusiasm. The activist is not too intelligent. He is constantly worried about management's opinion of him.
- Bear — Anthropomorphic bear who works as a blacksmith's hammerer. He is talented at sniffing out kulaks, the members of a farming class whom the activist and others want to exterminate.
- Zhachev — Cripple whom Voshchev passes at the beginning of the novel and berates for allegedly harassing young girls. He also abuses Pashkin's wife, knowing that Pashkin, who doesn't want to return to court, won't hurt him. At one point in the novel, a peasant refers to Zhachev as "comrade cripple."

== Major themes ==
Platonov was one of the first Russian thinkers to criticize Stalin's plans for collectivization as inhumane. Unlike many other dissidents, who had fled the country for places like France, Platonov was living in the Soviet Union at the time.

Stalin notwithstanding, Platonov had a deep passion for the Soviet Union. He believed that the socialist system would protect the world from fascist rule, but he was not sure that the human race was ready for such a task. Nonetheless, he disagreed with critics of socialism who claimed that technological advances would free workers from poor conditions, countering that efficient tools would do nothing but cause workers to lose sight of what's important in life. "Some naïve people may retort that the contemporary crisis of production overturns this point of view," he wrote. "It does not overturn anything. Imagine the extremely complex technical equipment of the society of contemporary imperialism and fascism, the grinding exhaustion and destruction of the people of these societies — and it will become only too clear at what price this increase in the forces of production has been achieved." He later added in private notebooks, "Not only the technique for the production of material life is being perfected but that of managing people as well. Could the last reach a crisis of overproduction, a crisis of the historical dead-end?"

Platonov believed that he was fighting for the future. According to him, children were the reason that he and others were working toward socialism. This theme is easily observable in the quotations of Voschev and Zhachev. In this way, Nastya serves as a symbol of the Soviet Union's future. She is young, intelligent, and happy, but Platonov uses her death to symbolize his worries about the country's state of affairs. He concludes The Foundation Pit with a quick note: "Will our soviet socialist republic perish like Nastya or will she grow up into a whole human being, into a new historical society? … The author may have been mistaken to portray in the form of the little girl's death the end of the socialist generation, but this mistake occurred only as a result of excessive alarm on behalf of something beloved, whose loss is tantamount to the destruction not only of all the past but also of the future."

== Philosophical aspects of the story ==
The story is replete with the philosophical vocabulary of an existential nature and has the character of a parable, where the protagonist is engaged in a painful search for the meaning of life, which also acts as truth, happiness, and "the general plan of life." Lack of meaning in life leads to a feeling of boredom, a drop in the "pace of work", dismissal and loss of livelihood. The story contains an allusion to Decartes' famous expression Cogito ergo sum when Voshchev says that he does not exist, but only thinks.

The artisans of the artel building the pit have the meaning of life, but they are emaciated and sullen. The solemn marching music of the brass band conveys "jubilant foreboding" and joy, but it is devoid of thought. Thus, the dichotomy of the meaning of life and joy is revealed.

One of the heroes of the Pit (Kozlov) generally doubts the need for happiness, declaring that from him "only shame", while sadness implies involvement in the whole world. Another hero (Safronov) suspects that truth is a class enemy. The kolkhoz activist considers the truth unimportant, since "the proletariat is supposed to move."

Of ethical attitudes, selflessness and enthusiasm are valued, and negligence and backwardness are censured.

== Reception ==
The Foundation Pit was not well received by Soviet officials, who saw the novel as a critique of Stalin's policies. It faced strict censorship and was not officially published in the country until 1987.

Others around the world received the work as a masterpiece. The Irish Times called the book a "hallucinatory, nightmarish parable of hysterical laughter and terrifying silences," and The Independent referred to Platonov as the "most exciting Russian writer to be rediscovered since the end of the Soviet Union."

== See also ==
- Andrei Platonov
- Collectivization in the Soviet Union
- Russian Revolution
- Existentialism
