= Bai Wei =

Bai Wei may refer to:

- Bai Wei (writer) (1894–1987), Chinese writer
- Jin Yaqin (1925–2016), Chinese actress who used the stage name Bai Wei
- Wieslaw Borkowski (born 1989), Polish sinologist-artist, Chinese name Bai Wei
