= Socialist realism =

Soviet style of realistic art depicting communist values

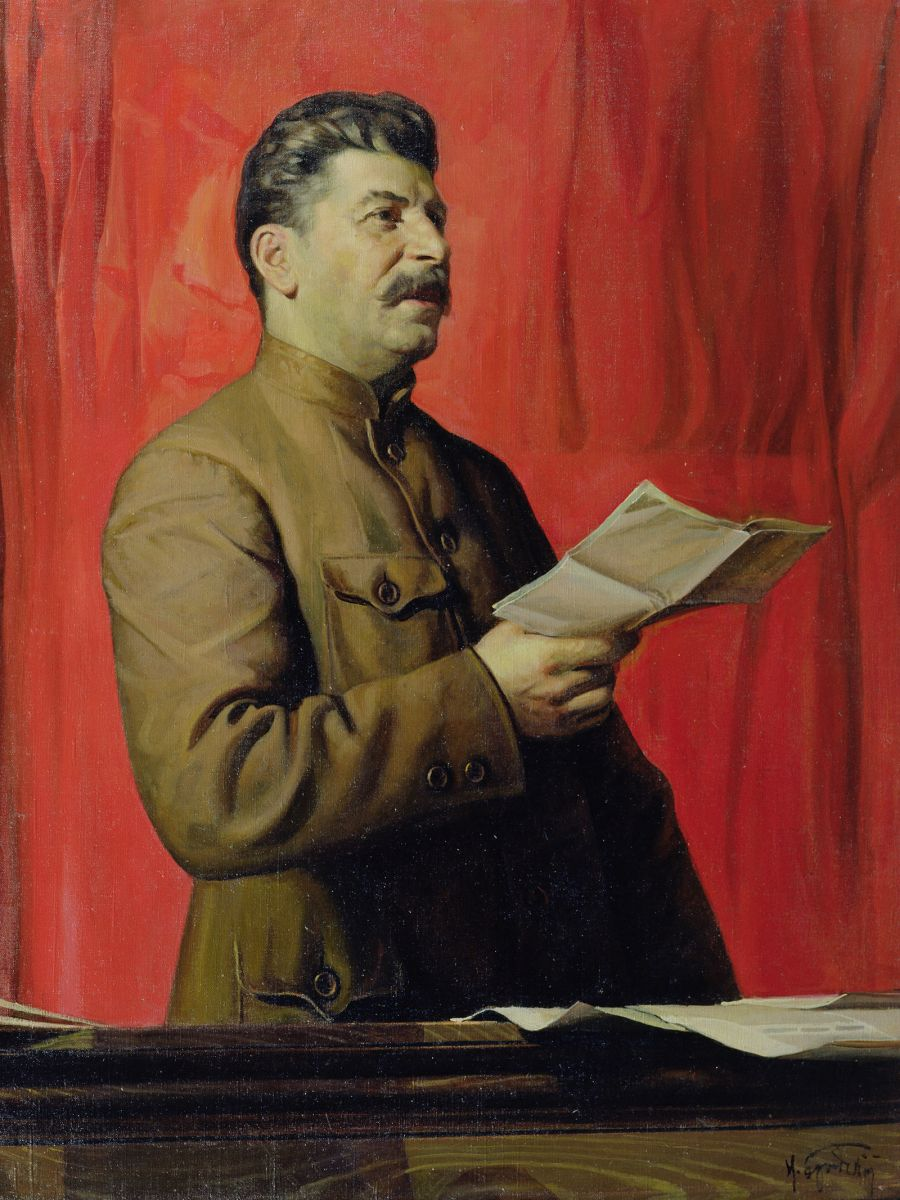
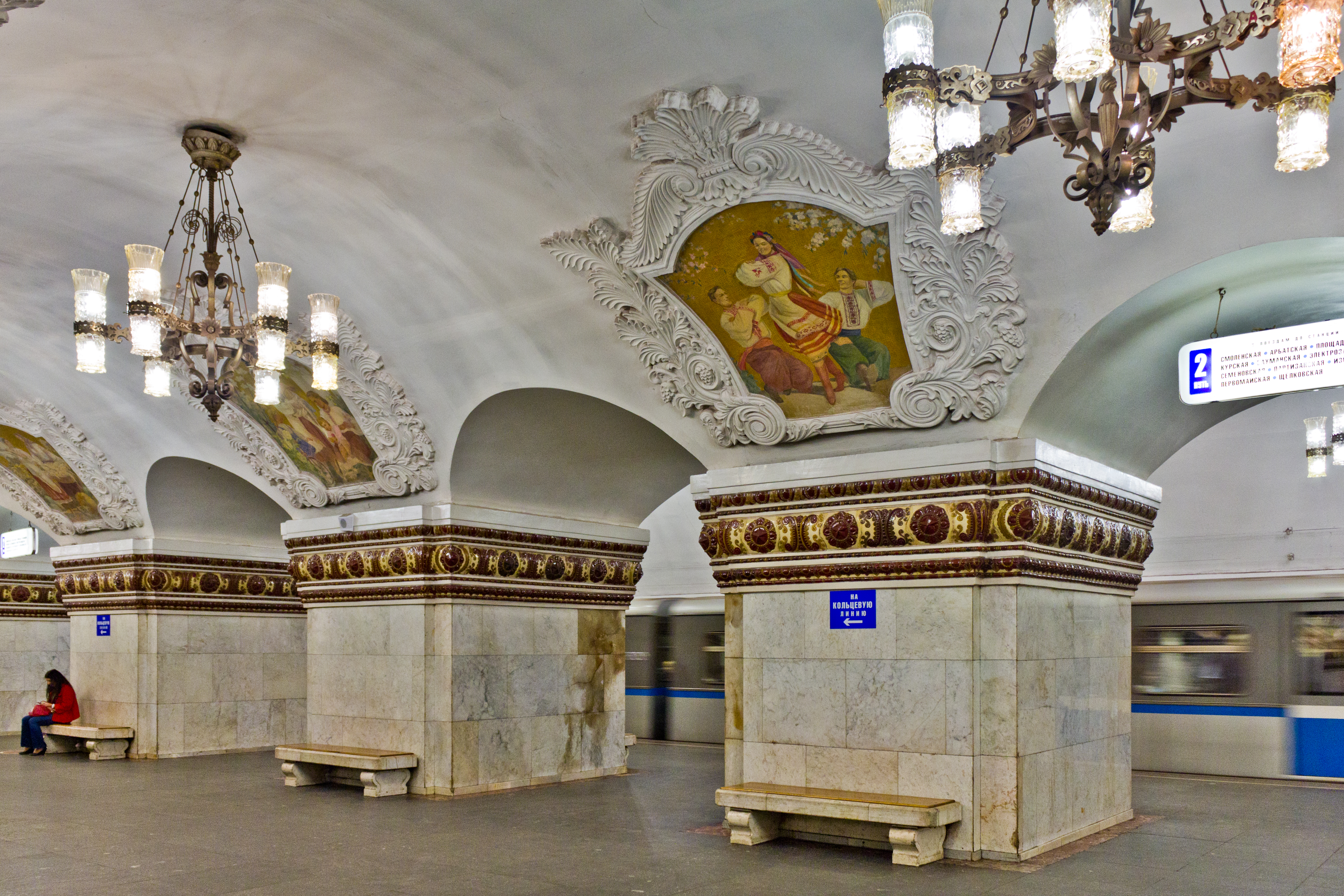
- Top to bottom: Portrait of J.V. Stalin by Isaak Brodsky (1933); Kiyevskaya station in the Moscow Metro

Additional media
- Years active: 1932 – present
- Location: Socialist countries
- Influences: Marxism, Realism

Socialist realism, also known as socrealism (from Russian соцреализм, sotsrealizm), is a style of idealized realistic art that was developed in the Soviet Union and was the official cultural doctrine, as well as in other socialist countries in the aftermath of World War II. The movement, in contrast to forms of avant-garde non-representational, stylized, or symbolic art, was based around a idealized photorealistic recreation of historic events, with a goal of advancing the socialist mission through inspirational imagery.

The formal objective of socialist realism was "to depict reality in its revolutionary development" although no definitive guidelines concerning style or subject matter were provided. Works of socialist realism were usually characterized by unambiguous narratives or iconography relating to the Marxist–Leninist ideology, such as the emancipation of the proletariat. In visual arts, socialist realism often relied on the conventions of academic art and classical sculpture. Socialist realism was usually devoid of complex artistic meaning or interpretation yet counter sources may provide different interpretations.

The origin of the term has been attributed to the writer Maxim Gorky, who introduced the concept (in a literary rather than visual context) in 1933. The doctrine was first proclaimed by the First Congress of Soviet Writers in 1934 as approved as the only acceptable method for Soviet cultural production in all media.

== History ==
=== Development ===
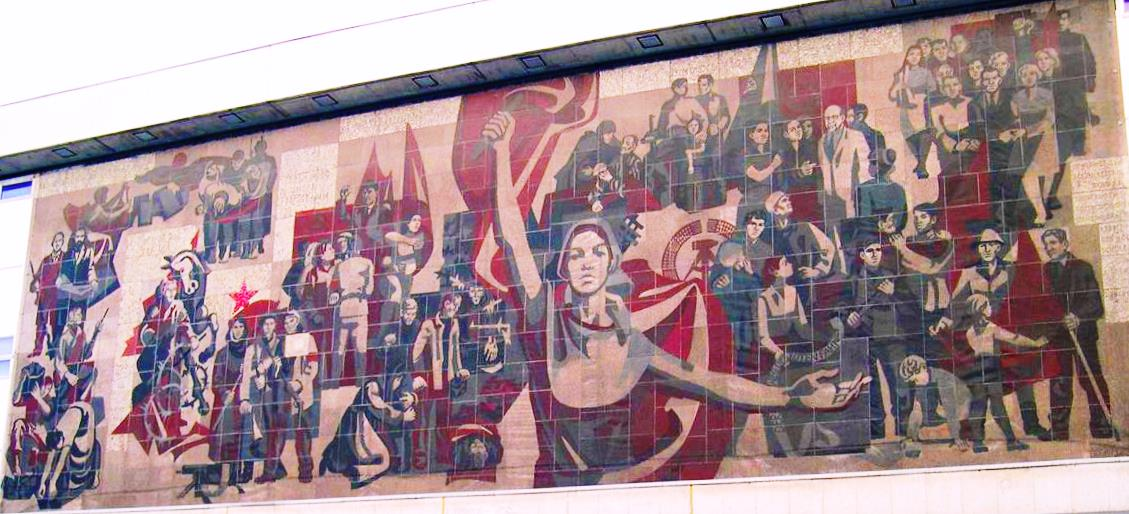
Detail, Der Weg der Roten Fahne, Kulturpalast Dresden, Germany

Socialist realism was developed by many thousands of artists, across a diverse society, over several decades. Early examples of realism in Russian art include the work of the Peredvizhnikis and Ilya Yefimovich Repin. While these works do not have the same political connotation, they exhibit the techniques exercised by their successors. After the Bolsheviks took control of Russia on October 25, 1917, there was a marked shift in artistic styles. There had been a short period of artistic exploration in the time between the fall of the Tsar and the rise of the Bolsheviks.

Shortly after the Bolsheviks took control, Anatoly Lunacharsky was appointed as head of Narkompros, the People's Commissariat for Enlightenment. This put Lunacharsky in the position of deciding the direction of art in the newly created Soviet state. Although Lunacharsky did not dictate a single aesthetic model for Soviet artists to follow, he developed a system of aesthetics based on the human body that would later help to influence socialist realism. He believed that "the sight of a healthy body, intelligent face or friendly smile was essentially life-enhancing." He concluded that art had a direct effect on the human organism and under the right circumstances that effect could be positive. By depicting "the perfect person" (New Soviet man), Lunacharsky believed art could educate citizens on how to be the perfect Soviets.

==== Debate within Soviet art ====
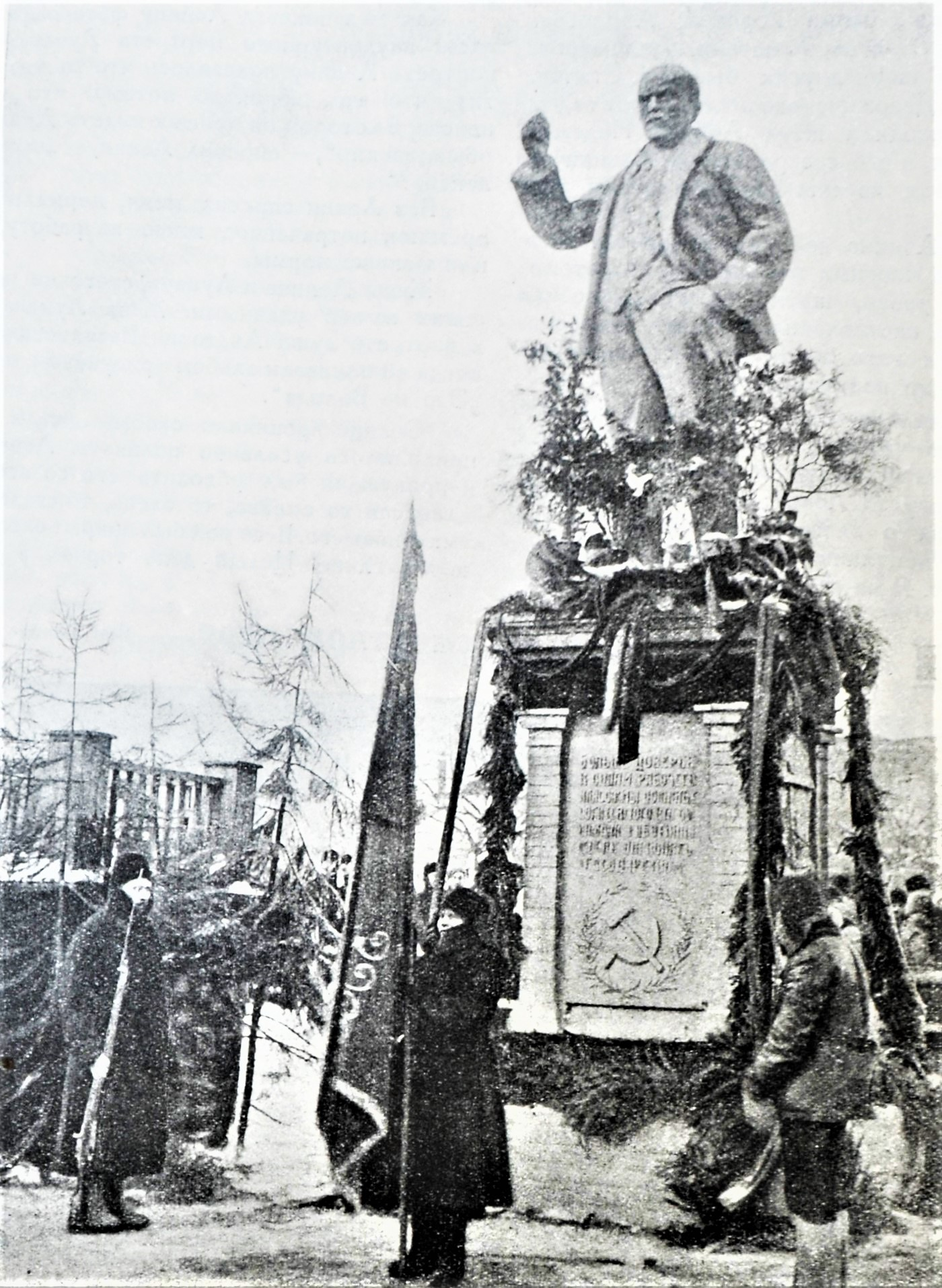
The Lenin monument in Noginsk, built by factory workers in the city of Noginsk near Moscow, was one of the first Lenin monuments.

There were two main groups debating the fate of Soviet art: futurists and traditionalists. Russian Futurists, many of whom had been creating abstract or leftist art before the Bolsheviks, believed communism required a complete rupture from the past and, therefore, so did Soviet art. Traditionalists believed in the importance of realistic representations of everyday life. Under Lenin's rule and the New Economic Policy, there was a certain amount of private commercial enterprise, allowing both the futurists and the traditionalists to produce their art for individuals with capital. By 1928, the Soviet government had enough strength and authority to end private enterprises, thus ending support for fringe groups such as the futurists. At this point, although the term "socialist realism" was not being used, its defining characteristics became the norm.

According to the Great Russian Encyclopedia, the term was first used in press by chairman of the organizing committee of the Union of Soviet Writers, Ivan Gronsky in Literaturnaya Gazeta on May 23, 1932. The term was approved in meetings that included politicians of the highest level, including Joseph Stalin. Maxim Gorky, a proponent of literary socialist realism, published a famous article titled "Socialist Realism" in 1933. During the Congress of 1934, four guidelines were laid out for socialist realism. The work must be:

1. Proletarian: art relevant to the workers and understandable to them.
2. Typical: scenes of everyday life of the people.
3. Realistic: in the representational sense.
4. Partisan: supportive of the aims of the State and the Party.

=== Characteristics ===
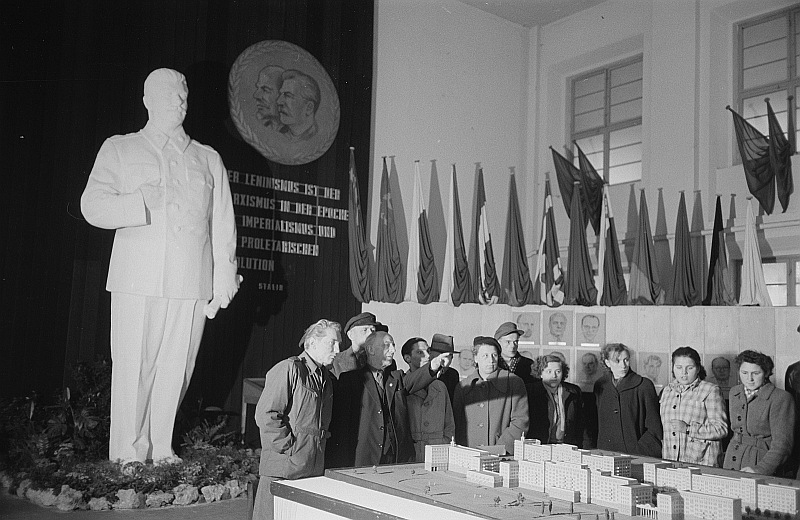
Workers inspect architectural model under a statue of Stalin, Leipzig, East Germany, 1953.

The purpose of socialist realism was to limit popular culture to a specific, highly regulated faction of emotional expression that promoted Soviet ideals. The party was of the utmost importance and was always to be favorably featured. The key concepts that developed assured loyalty to the party were partiinost' (party-mindedness), ideinost (idea and ideological content), klassovost (class content), pravdivost (truthfulness). Ideinost was an important concept: not only was the work to embody an approved idea, but its content was more important than its form. This allowed the identification of formalism, a work in which the formal aspects of a work of art commanded more importance than the subject matter, or content.

There was a prevailing sense of optimism, as socialist realism's function was to show the ideal Soviet society. Not only was the present glorified, but the future was also supposed to be depicted in an agreeable fashion. Because the present and the future were constantly idealized, socialist realism had a sense of forced optimism. Tragedy and negativity were not permitted, unless they were shown in a different time or place. This sentiment created what would later be dubbed "revolutionary romanticism".

Revolutionary romanticism elevated the common worker, whether factory or agricultural, by presenting his life, work, and recreation as admirable. Its purpose was to show how much the standard of living had improved thanks to the revolution, as educational information, to teach Soviet citizens how they should be acting and to improve morale. The ultimate aim was to create what Lenin called "an entirely new type of human being": The New Soviet Man. Art (especially posters and murals) was a way to instill party values on a massive scale. Stalin described the socialist realist artists as "engineers of souls".

Common images used in socialist realism were flowers, sunlight, the body, youth, flight, industry, and new technology. These poetic images were used to show the utopianism of communism and the Soviet state. Art became more than an aesthetic pleasure; instead it served a very specific function. Soviet ideals placed functionality and work above all else; therefore, for art to be admired, it must serve a purpose. Georgi Plekhanov, a Marxist theoretician, states that art is useful if it serves society: "There can be no doubt that art acquired a social significance only in so far as it depicts, evokes, or conveys actions, emotions and events that are of significance to society."

The themes depicted would feature the beauty of work, the achievements of the collective and the individual for the good of the whole. The artwork would often feature an easily discernible educational message.

The artist could not, however, portray life just as they saw it because anything that reflected poorly on Communism had to be omitted as it did not reflect material reality of the work of the artist. People who could not be shown as either wholly good or wholly evil could not be used as characters as the concept of pure good and evil did not exist. Art was filled with health and happiness: paintings showed busy industrial and agricultural scenes; sculptures depicted workers, sentries, and schoolchildren.

Creativity was an important part of socialist realism. The styles used in creating art during this period were those that would produce the most realistic results based on material realism. Painters would depict happy, muscular peasants and workers in factories and collective farms. During the Stalin period, they produced numerous heroic portraits of Stalin to serve his cult of personality – all in the most realistic fashion possible. The most important thing for a socialist realist artist was not artistic integrity as it was political in nature, thus creating a singular materialistic realism aesthetic.

=== Important groups ===
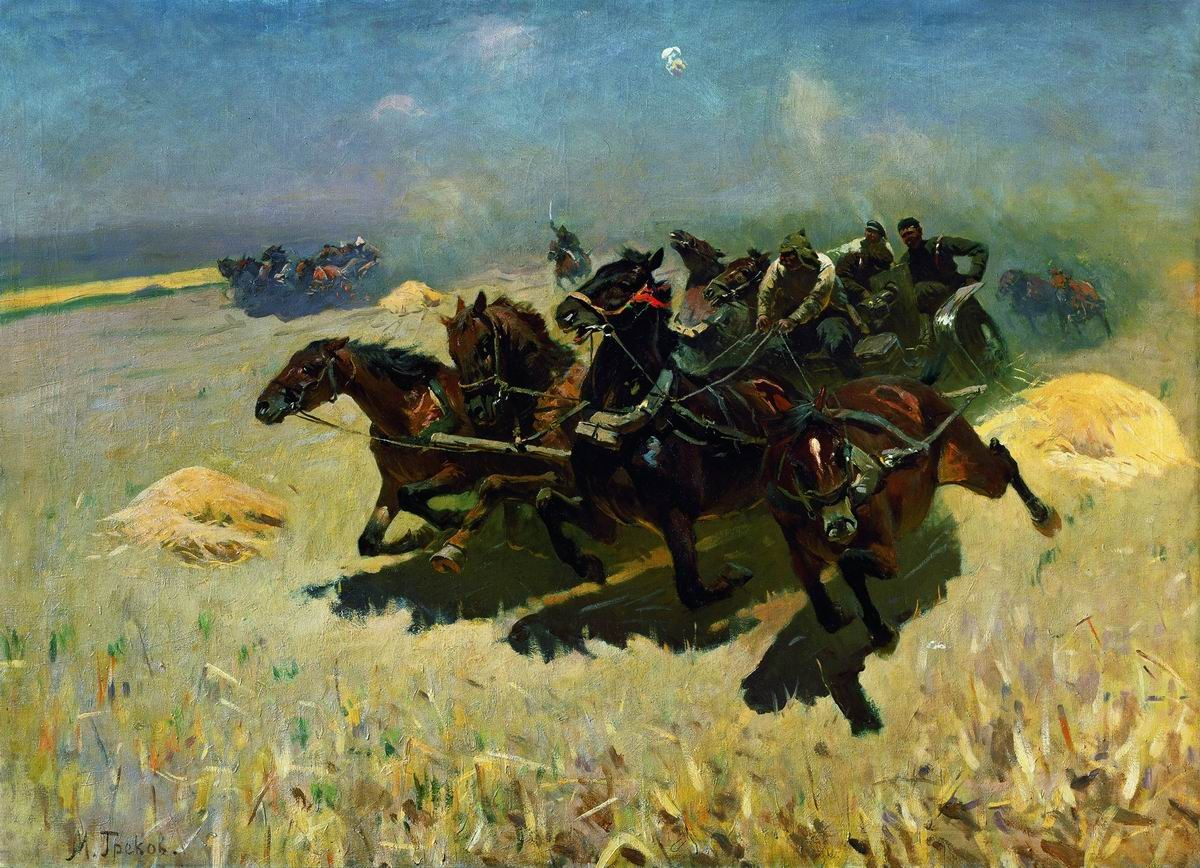
Mitrofan Grekov. Tachanka. 1924

The Merriam-Webster Dictionary defines socialist realism as "a Marxist aesthetic theory calling for the didactic use of literature, art, and music to develop social consciousness in an evolving socialist state". Socialist realism compelled artists of all forms to create positive or uplifting reflections of socialist utopian life by utilizing any visual media, such as posters, movies, newspapers, theater and radio, beginning during the Communist Revolution of 1917 and escalating during the reign of Stalin until the early 1980s.

Vladimir Lenin, head of the Russian government 1917–1924, laid the foundation for this new wave of art, suggesting that art is for the people and the people should love and understand it, while uniting the masses. Artists Naum Gabo and Antoine Pevsner attempted to define the lines of art under Lenin by writing "The Realist Manifesto" in 1920, suggesting that artists should be given free rein to create as their muse desired. Lenin, however, had a different purpose for art: wanting it functional, and Stalin built on that belief that art should be agitation.

The term Socialist Realism was proclaimed in 1934 at the Soviet Writer's congress, although it was left not precisely defined. This turned individual artists and their works into state-controlled propaganda.

Art historian Maria Silina argued that socialist realism was a reaction to the Campaign against Formalism and Naturalism from 1936—1938 in the Soviet Union. This was a movement of art criticism headed by the Committee on Artistic Affairs, and occurred concurrently with the Great Purge, although it was distinctly not initiated by a political decree or state resolution. This wave of criticism began when the Pravda published an editorial criticizing Dmitri Shostakovich's Lady Macbeth of Mtsensk (1932) for its "petit-bourgeois" jazz influences. Soviet art critic Osip Beskin also denounced formalism in a 1933 presentation, criticizing artists like David Sterenberg, Vladimir Tatlin, Kazimir Malevich, Ivan Kliun, Mikhail Larionov, Aristarkh Kentulov, and Alexander Tyshler, despite their differing styles. Other art critics and historians began criticizing both formalism and naturalism as overly derivative of Western bourgeois art. Critics disliked the work of organizations like the AKhRR and the International Bureau of Revolutionary Artists for their overt attention to detail and inability to distinguish the "important" and "unimportant" in art. Silina, however, notes that artists' style was unrelated to their being targeted in the Purge, arguing that many formalists like Shostakovich and Evgenii Katsman remained prominent throughout the Stalinist era. The anti-naturalism movement continued through the 1940s, with many Soviet critics condemning Aleksander Laktionov's work for its realism. The artist, however was lauded by Soviet leadership.

After the death of Stalin in 1953, he was succeeded by Nikita Khrushchev who allowed for less draconian state controls and openly condemned Stalin's artistic demands in 1956 with his "Secret Speech", and thus began a reversal in policy known as "Khrushchev's Thaw". In 1964, Khrushchev was removed and replaced by Leonid Brezhnev, who reintroduced Stalin's ideas and reversed the artistic decisions made by Khrushchev. However, by the early 1980s, the Socialist Realist movement had begun to fade. Artists to date remark that the Russian Social Realist movement as the most oppressive and shunned period of Soviet Art.

==== Association of Artists of Revolutionary Russia (AKhRR) ====
The Association of Artists of Revolutionary Russia (AKhRR) was established in 1922 and was one of the most influential artist groups in the USSR. The AKhRR worked to truthfully document contemporary life in Russia by utilizing "heroic realism". The term "heroic realism" was the beginning of the socialist realism archetype. AKhRR was sponsored by influential government officials such as Leon Trotsky and carried favor with the Red Army. Early realism headed by the AKhRR may have also been inspired by German New Objectivity and other European modernist art.

In 1928, the AKhRR was renamed to the Association of Artists of the Revolution (AKhR) in order to include the rest of the Soviet states. At this point the group had begun participating in state promoted mass forms of art like murals, jointly-made paintings, advertisement production and textile design. The group was disbanded April 23, 1932 by the decree "On the Reorganization of Literary and Artistic Organizations" serving as the nucleus for the Stalinist USSR Union of Artists.

==== Studio of military artists named after M. B. Grekov ====
A studio of military artists was created in 1934.

==== The Union of Soviet Writers (USW) ====
The creation of the Union of Soviet Writers was partially initiated by Maxim Gorky to unite the Soviet writers of different methods, such as the "proletarian" writers (such as Fyodor Panfyorov), praised by the Communist Party, and the poputchicks (such as Boris Pasternak and Andrei Bely). In August 1934, the union held its first congress where Gorky said:

The Writers' Union is not being created merely for the purpose of bodily uniting all artists of the pen, but so that professional unification may enable them to comprehend their corporate strength, to define with all possible clarity their varied tendencies, creative activity, guiding principles, and harmoniously to merge all aims in that unity which is guiding all the creative working energies of the country.

One of the most famous authors during this time was Alexander Fadeyev. Fadeyev was a close personal friend of Stalin, referring to him as "one of the greatest humanists the world has ever seen." His most famous works include The Rout and The Young Guard.

== Reception and impact ==
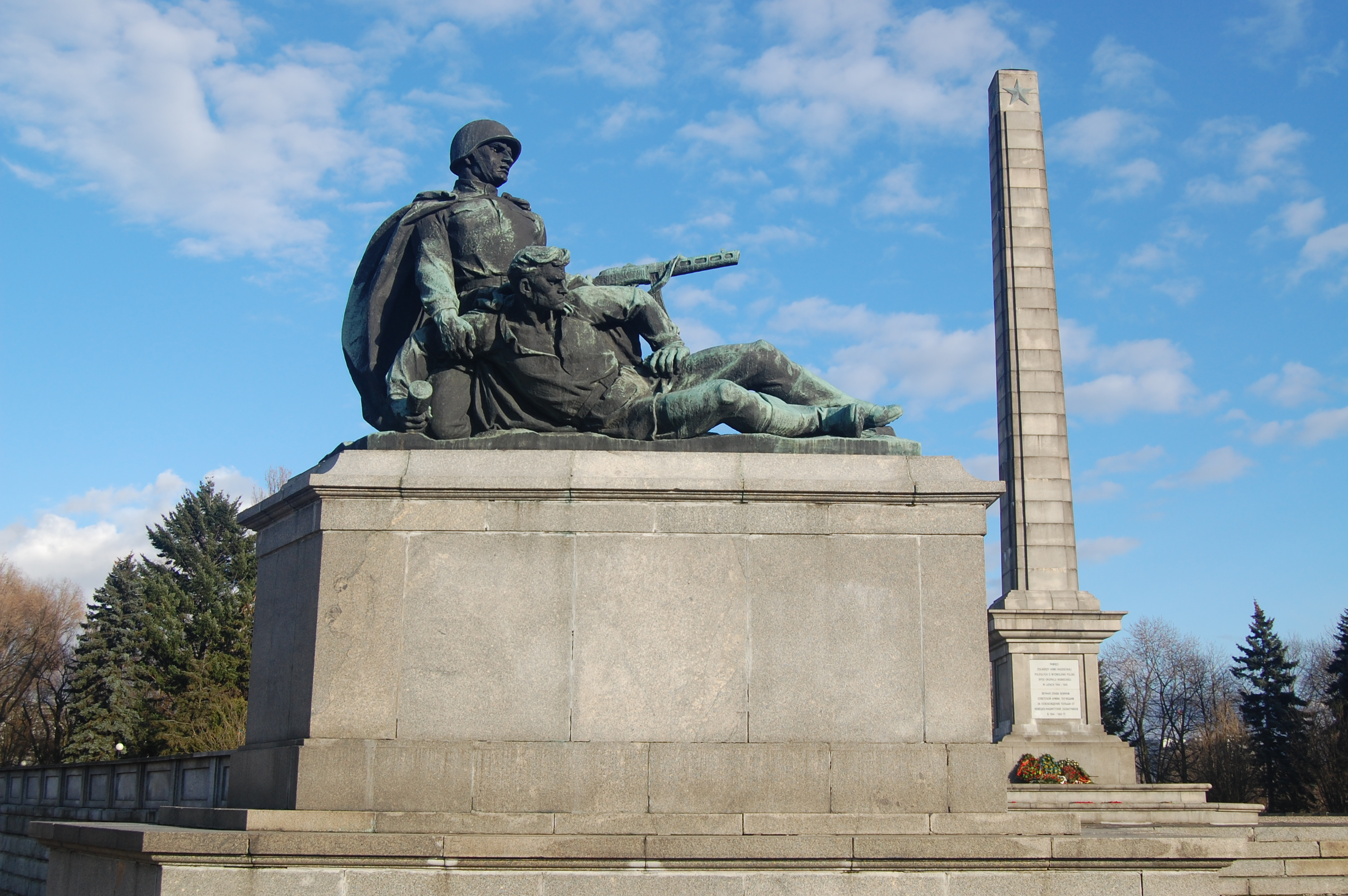
A monumental obelisk surrounded by sculptures of soldiers at the Soviet Military Cemetery, Warsaw

Stalin's adversary, Leon Trotsky, was highly critical of this rigid approach towards the arts. He viewed cultural conformity as an expression of Stalinism in which "the literary schools were strangled one after the other" and the method of command extended across various areas from scientific agriculture to music. Overall, he regarded socialist realism to be an arbitrary construct of the Stalinist bureaucracy.

"In that victorious revolution, there is not only the revolution, but also a new privileged stratum...[which] has strangled artistic creation with a totalitarian hand...Even under absolute monarchy art was based on idealization, but not on falsification, whereas in the Soviet Union official art – and none other exists there – is sharing in the fate of official justice; its purpose is to glorify the "Leader" and to manufacture officially a heroic myth...The style of official Soviet painting is being described as "socialist realism" – the label could have been invented only by a bureaucrat at the head of an Arts Department."

Analyzing the spread of socialist literature in the 1950s, academic Nicolai Volland writes that it expressed a new tradition of "socialist cosmopolitanism." Volland writes that this tradition involved the transnational exchange of socialist cultural works as a mechanism of "empowering groups of subalterns that were hitherto shut out of the cosmopolitan world."

The impact of socialist realist art can still be seen decades after it ceased being the only state-supported style. Even before the end of the USSR in 1991, the government had been reducing its practices of censorship. After Stalin's death in 1953, Nikita Khrushchev began to condemn the previous regime's practice of excessive restrictions. This freedom allowed artists to begin experimenting with new techniques, but the shift was not immediate. It was not until the ultimate fall of Soviet rule that artists were no longer restricted by the deposed Communist Party. Many socialist realist tendencies prevailed until the mid-to-late 1990s and early 2000s.

In the 1990s, many Russian artists used the characteristics of socialist realism in an ironic fashion. This was completely different from what existed only a couple of decades before. Once artists broke from the socialist realist mould, there was a significant power shift. Artists began including subjects that could not exist according to Soviet ideals. Now that power over appearances was taken away from the government, artists achieved a level of authority that had not existed since the early 20th century. In the decade immediately after the fall of the USSR, artists represented socialist realism and the Soviet legacy as a traumatic event. By the next decade, there was a unique sense of detachment.

Western cultures often do not look at socialist realism positively. Democratic countries view the art produced during this period of repression as a lie based on their Capitalist realism. Non-Marxist art historians tend to view communism as a form of totalitarianism that smothers artistic expression and therefore retards the progress of capitalist culture. In recent years there has been a reclamation of the movement in Moscow with the addition of the Institute of Russian Realist Art (IRRA), a three-story museum dedicated to preserving 20th-century Russian realist paintings.

== Notable works and artists ==
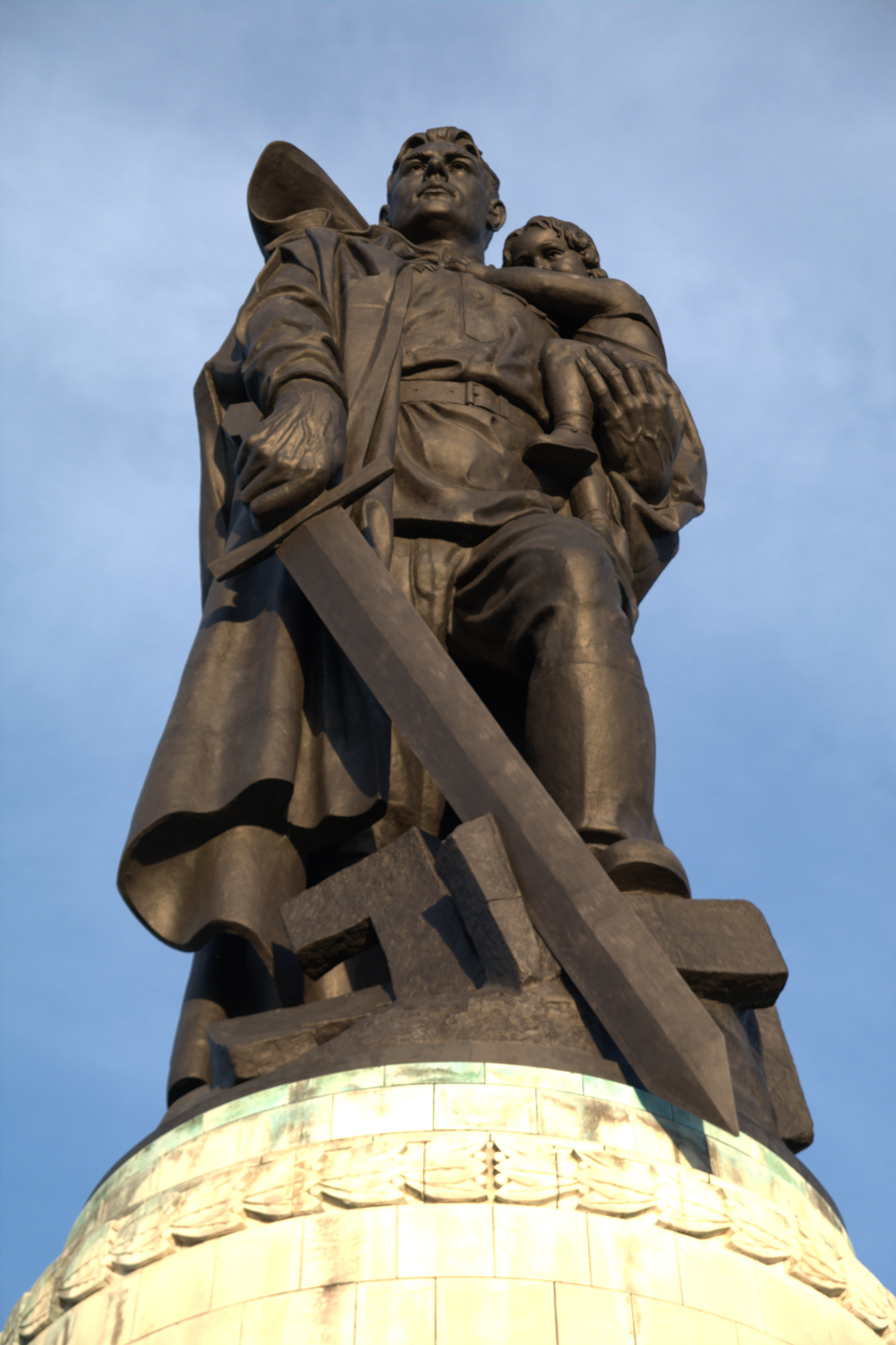
"Soldier-Liberator" by Yevgeny Vuchetich. Treptower Park Memorial, Berlin (1948–1949)

=== Music ===
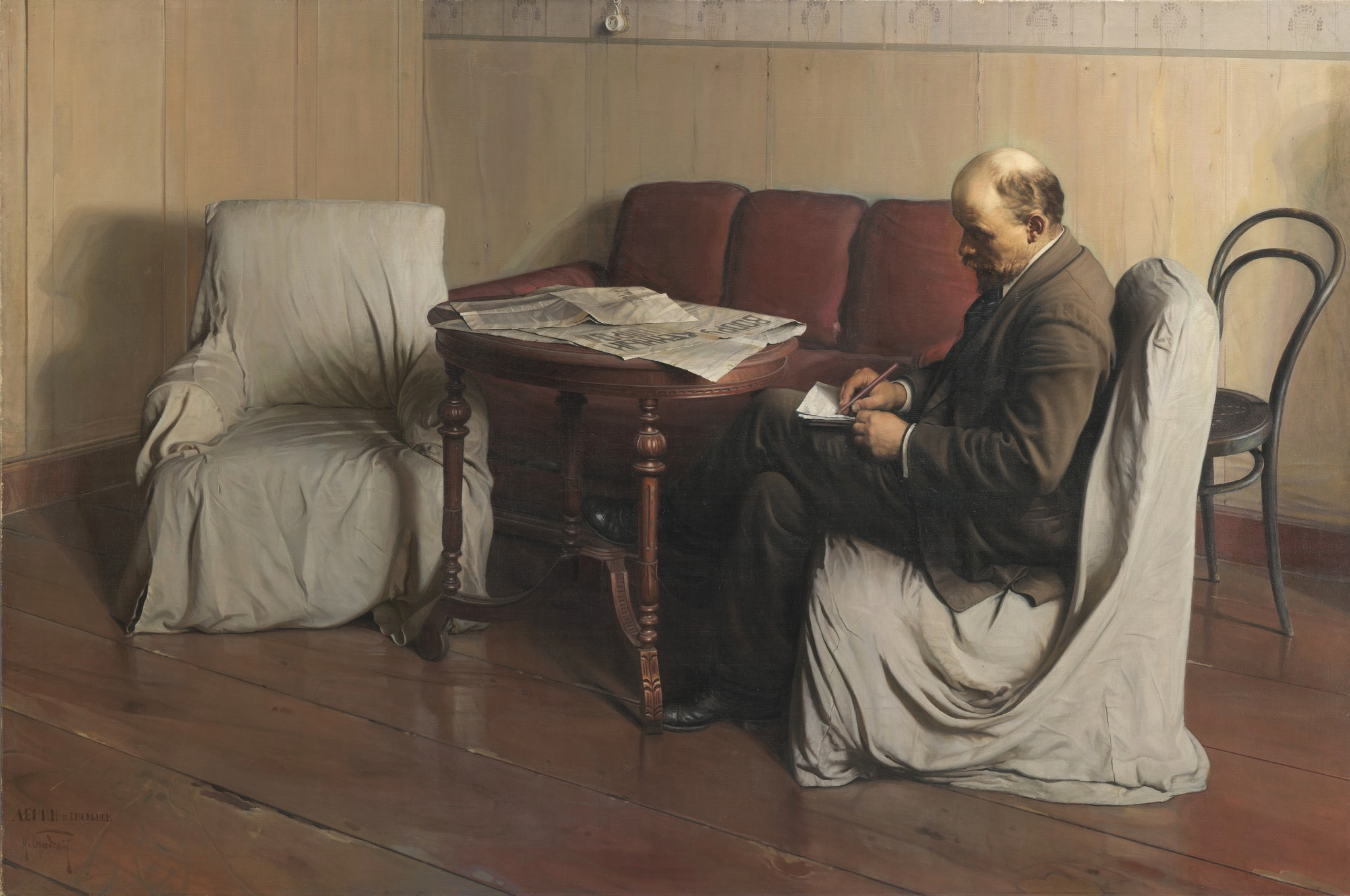
Isaak Brodsky, Lenin in Smolny (1930)

Closely associated with the rise of the labor movement was the development of the revolutionary song, which was performed at demonstrations and meetings. Among the most famous of the revolutionary songs are The Internationale and Whirlwinds of Danger. Notable songs from Russia include Boldly, Comrades, in Step, Workers' Marseillaise, and Rage, Tyrants. Folk and revolutionary songs influenced the Soviet mass songs. The mass song was a leading genre in Soviet music, especially during the 1930s and the war. The mass song influenced other genres, including the art song, opera, and film music. The most popular mass songs include Dunaevsky's Song of the Homeland, Isaakovsky's Katiusha, Novikov's Hymn of Democratic Youth of the World, and Aleksandrov's Sacred War.

=== Film ===
Discussions of film as a tool of the Soviet state began in the early twentieth century. Socialist realism sought to establish an aesthetic regime that transcended the preferences of individuals, institutions, and even particular political actors. This regime was normatively defined and delimited in accordance with the values through which socialist society was constructed, legitimized, and reproduced. Within this clearly delineated framework, a recurring set of themes, character typologies, narrative situations, and interpretative approaches emerged, resulting in the production of films that closely resembled one another. The stories of individual characters were designed to embody the fundamental principles of human history in general and of the Soviet Union in particular, while their plots were structured in accordance with this ideological framework.

The individual destinies of the protagonists were linked to humanity’s dignified historical progress and represented as part of an evolutionary process shaped by socialist ideals. In this way, the socialist order was presented as the most ideal, rational, and logically coherent form of social organization, not only for the Soviet Union but for the entire world. In pursuing this historical objective, protagonists relinquished their personal desires and aspirations, subordinating their individual existence to the construction of a socialist identity. As illustrated by *Chapaev*, even the most beloved, valuable, and powerful hero could sacrifice himself, while the banner of socialism continued to be carried by other protagonists. This narrative pattern emphasized that the revolution derived its permanence not from particular individuals but from the ideas they represented. Over time, however, increasing centralized pressure concerning the strategies through which films were expected to communicate political messages and educate their audiences relegated aesthetic considerations to a secondary position. By restricting the narrative and artistic diversity of cinematic production, this tendency contributed to the transformation of films into a didactic and normative form of “sermon.” The functions attributed to the doctrine of socialist realism—including “narrating,” “teaching,” “inducing forgetting,” and “transforming collective memory” through the deformation of historical memory—became especially influential in the field of cinema.

Leon Trotsky argued that cinema could be used to supplant the influence of the Orthodox Church in Russia. In the early 1930s, Soviet filmmakers applied socialist realism in their work. Notable films include Chapaev, which shows the role of the people in the history-making process. The theme of revolutionary history was developed in films such as The Youth of Maxim by Grigori Kozintsev and Leonid Trauberg, Shchors by Dovzhenko, and We are from Kronstadt by E. Dzigan. The shaping of the new man under socialism was a theme of films such as A Start Life by N. Ekk, Ivan by Dovzhenko, Valerii Chkalov by M. Kalatozov and the film version of Tanker "Derbent" (1941). Some films depicted the part of peoples of the Soviet Union against foreign invaders: Alexander Nevsky by Eisenstein, Minin and Pozharsky by Pudovkin, and Bogdan Khmelnitsky by Savchenko. Soviet politicians were the subjects in films such as Yutkevich's trilogy of movies about Lenin. Socialist realism was also applied to Hindi films of the 1940s and 1950s. These include Chetan Anand's Neecha Nagar (1946), which won the Grand Prize at the 1st Cannes Film Festival, and Bimal Roy's Two Acres of Land (1953), which won the International Prize at the 7th Cannes Film Festival.

=== Paintings ===
The painter Aleksandr Deineka provides a notable example for his expressionist and patriotic scenes of the Second World War, collective farms, and sports. Yuriy Ivanovich Pimenov, Boris Ioganson, Isaak Brodsky and Geli Korzev have also been described as "unappreciated masters of twentieth-century realism". Another well-known practitioner was Fyodor Pavlovich Reshetnikov. Socialist realist art found acceptance in the Baltic nations, inspiring many artists. One such artist was Czeslaw Znamierowski (23 May 1890 – 9 August 1977), a Soviet Lithuanian painter, known for his large panoramic landscapes and love of nature. Znamierowski combined these two passions to create very notable paintings in the Soviet Union, earning the prestigious title of Honorable Artist of LSSR in 1965. Born in Latvia, which formed part of the Russian Empire at the time, Znamierowski was of Polish descent and Lithuanian citizenship, a country where he lived for most of his life and died. He excelled in landscapes and social realism, and held many exhibitions. Znamierowski was also widely published in national newspapers, magazines and books. His more notable paintings include Before Rain (1930), Panorama of Vilnius City (1950), The Green Lake (1955), and In Klaipeda Fishing Port (1959). A large collection of his art is located in the Lithuanian Art Museum.

==== Gallery of Socialist realism paintings ====
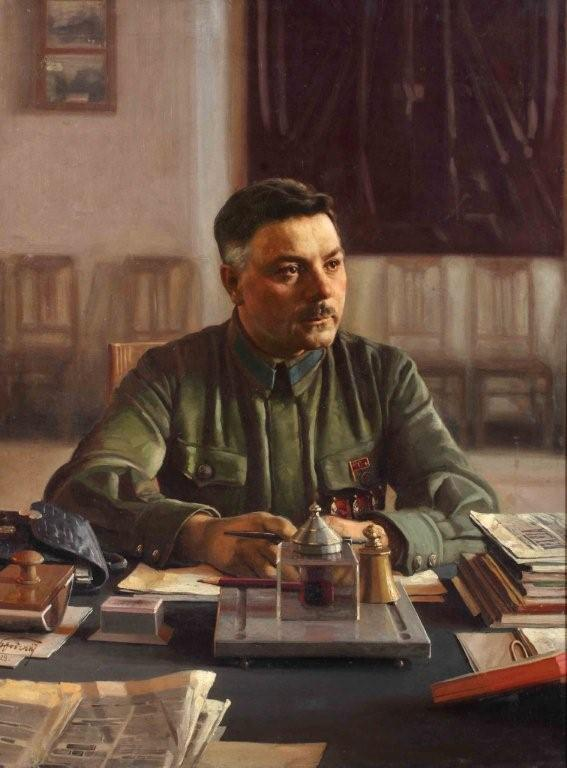
Isaak Brodsky, "Kliment Voroshilov", 1929

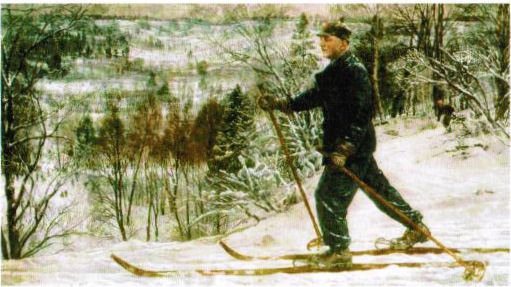
Isaak Brodsky, "Kliment Voroshilov skiing"

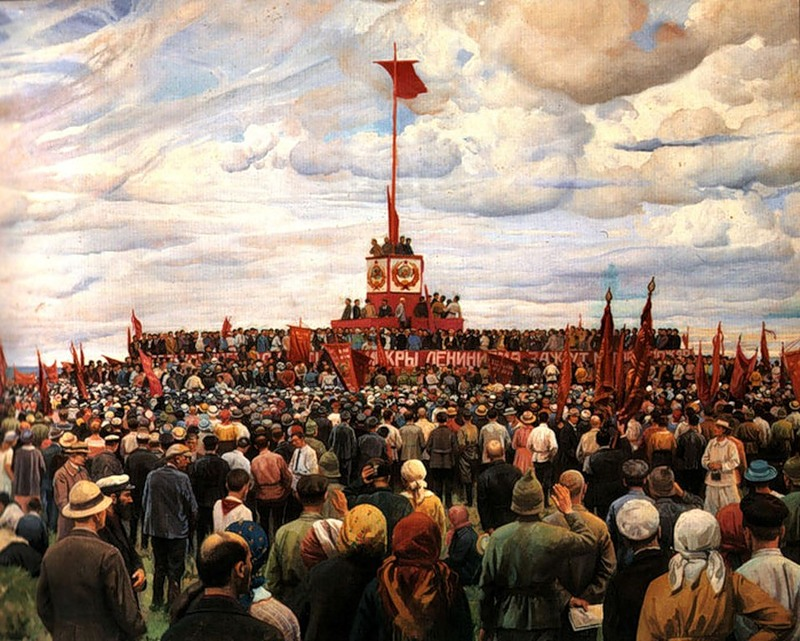
Isaak Brodsky, "Day of Soviet Constitution" (1930)

=== Literature ===
Bruno Apitz's novel Nackt unter Wölfen, a story that culminates in the vivid description of the self-liberation of the detainees, was deliberately chosen to take place on the same day as the formal opening of the Buchenwald Monument in September 1958.

Maxim Gorky's novel Mother (1906) is usually considered to have been the first socialist-realist novel. Gorky was also a major factor in the school's rapid rise, and his pamphlet, On Socialist Realism, essentially lays out the needs of Soviet art. Other important works of literature include Fyodor Gladkov's Cement (1925), Nikolai Ostrovsky's How the Steel Was Tempered (1936) and Aleksey Tolstoy's epic trilogy The Road to Calvary (1922–1941). Yury Krymov's novel Tanker "Derbent" (1938) portrays Soviet merchant seafarers being transformed by the Stakhanovite movement. Thol, a novel by D. Selvaraj in Tamil is a standing example of Marxist Realism in India. It won a literary award (Sahithya Akademi) for the year 2012.

=== Sculptures ===
Sculptor Fritz Cremer created a series of monuments commemorating the victims of the Nazi regime in the former concentration camps Auschwitz, Buchenwald, Mauthausen and Ravensbrück. His bronze monument in Buchenwald, depicting the liberation of this concentration camp by detainees in April 1945, is considered one of the most striking examples of socialist realism in GDR sculpture for its representation of communist liberation. Each figure in the monument, erected outside the campsite, has symbolic significance according to the orthodox communist interpretation of the event. Thus communists were portrayed as the driving force behind self-liberation, symbolized by a figure in the foreground sacrificing himself for his sufferers, followed by the central group of determined comrades through whose courage and fearlessness is encouraged. The German Democratic Republic used these sculptures to reaffirm its claim to the historical and political legacy of the anti-fascist struggle for freedom.

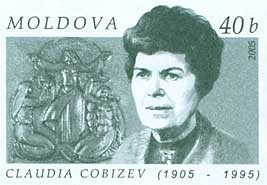
Cobizev featured on a stamp of Moldova

Claudia Cobizev was a Moldovan sculptor, whose work was known for its sensitive portrayals of women and children. Her most notable work is Cap de moldoveancă which was exhibited at the Paris International Exhibition to wide acclaim.

=== Theater ===
Theater is a realm in which socialist realism as a movement took root as a way to reach out and appeal to the masses. This occurred both within the Soviet bloc as well as outside of it, with China being another hotbed for socialist realism within theater.

==== Soviet Union ====
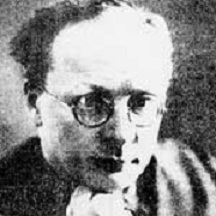
Photo of Platon Kerzhentsev

Countries within the Soviet Union were heavily influenced by socialist realism when it came to theater. Early after the 1917 revolution, a movement arose to attempt to redefine what theater was, with theorist Platon Kerzhentsev wanting to break down the barriers between actors and the public, creating unity between the two.

With the revolution, there was the ability to change the existing theatrical institutions to fit the new ideas circulating. The early 1920s saw this explosion of creativity, with organizations such as the TEO Narkompros (the Department of Fine Arts) working to incorporate new types of theater. Thus, these movements were later brought under control and solidified by the Soviet government, as individual theatrical troupes were organized and transformed through governmental support.

A part of these movements involved the reinvention of classic shows, including those in the Western canon. Hamlet particularly had a draw for Russians, and was seen to provide insight into the workings and complexities of Russian life after the 1917 revolution. Playwrights attempted to express their feelings about life around them while additionally following the guidelines of socialist realism, a way of reinventing old shows. Hamlet was re-imagined by Nikolay Akimov, for example, as a show that was more materialist in nature, coming at the end of this era of experimentation.

These movements were not merely localized to Russia, but spread throughout the USSR, with Poland being a notable location where socialist realism was implemented in theater. In order to make theater more accessible to the average person (for both entertainment and educational purposes), an emphasis was put on creating a network of smaller, independent theaters, including those in rural communities and traveling companies.

By making theater available to everyone, not simply those with the time and money to view it, officials hoped to educate the public both on theater itself and the various ideologies they wanted to promote. Beliefs that were more heavily promoted included those seen to be educational (with the idea of “teaching through entertaining” springing up), those upholding the values of nature and the countryside, and those that generally had a positive quality, especially when looking at children’s theater.

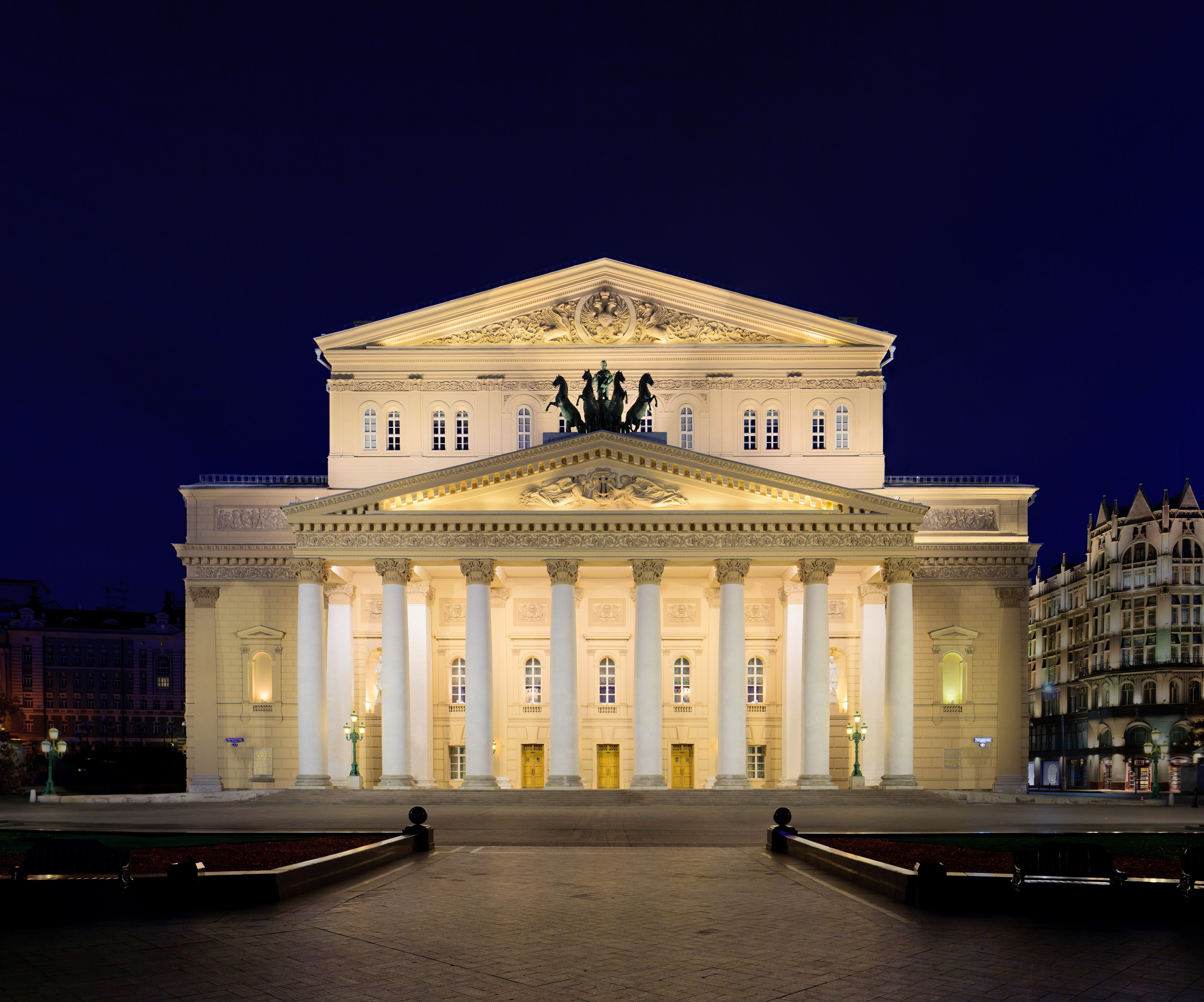
Photo of the Bolshoi Theater in Moscow

Reinvention of old forms took place, along with the creation of new theatrical movements. Opera as a theatrical form was reinterpreted and reinvented throughout the Soviet Union, moving away from its aristocratic roots and towards the support of the new state. By the 1930s, the Bolshoi Theater in particular became a symbol of Bolshevik power, and the question became how to best integrate socialist realism into an opera that could be performed there. The Union of Soviet Composers, established 1932, played a role towards creating these new operas, and spoke about the importance of socialist realism in opposition to modernistic art.

==== China ====
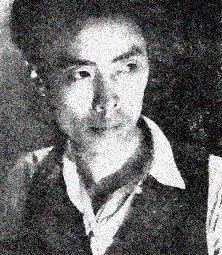
Photo of Tian Han, playwright and president of the China Theater Association

Theater in China fell under the state’s purview after the Chinese Communist Revolution, led partly by poet and playwright Tian Han, President of the China Theater Association (among other honors). He pushed for theatrical reform in a socialist manner, primarily focused on transferring ownership from private troupes to state ones, but additionally on the subject matter of the plays themselves.

In the midst of these reforms, ideas around feminism and how it tied into socialism emerged, specifically with regards to theater. Bai Wei, inspired by Tian Han, developed a style of theater in the 1920s that focused specifically on women within a patriarchal society, and the struggle to break free of it. She additionally incorporated ideas of socialist realism within her work, though did break from it in some ways, including the fact that her characters were more individualized and less collective. Strong female characters were, however, idealized and put forward in Chinese socialist realism, with these women often shown making some sort of sacrifice or grand action in service of a greater cause.

Socialist realism in Chinese theater can be seen to home in on the ideas that it is more valuable to take action as a group, together, than individually. This is evident from plays put on during the Cultural Revolution, where common themes included a large group standing up to imperialist forces (such as a Japanese invasion, for example), with the individual characters within the play being less important than the overarching power struggle occurring.

== Soviet Union ==
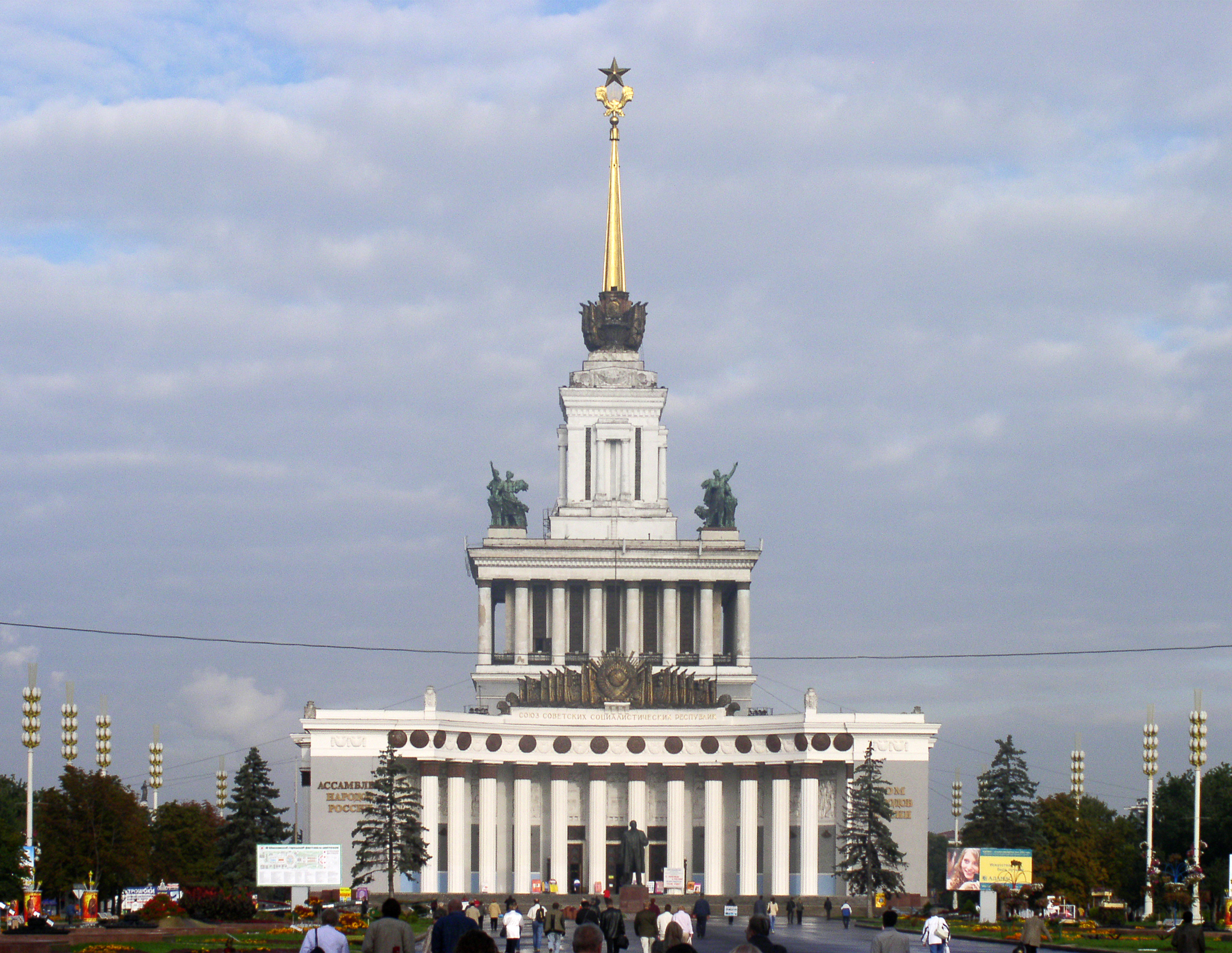
The VDNH in Moscow

In conjunction with the Socialist Classical style of architecture, socialist realism was the officially approved type of art in the Soviet Union for more than fifty years. In the early years of the Soviet Union, Russian and Soviet artists embraced a wide variety of art forms under the auspices of Proletkult. Revolutionary politics and radical non-traditional art forms were seen as complementary.

These styles of art were later rejected by members of the Communist Party who did not appreciate modern styles such as Impressionism and Cubism. Socialist realism was, to some extent, a reaction against the adoption of these "decadent" styles. It was thought by Lenin that the non-representative forms of art were not understood by the proletariat and could therefore not be used by the state for propaganda.

Alexander Bogdanov argued that the radical reformation of society to communist principles meant little if any bourgeois art would prove useful; some of his more radical followers advocated the destruction of libraries and museums. Lenin rejected this philosophy, deplored the rejection of the beautiful because it was old, and explicitly described art as needing to call on its heritage: "Proletarian culture must be the logical development of the store of knowledge mankind has accumulated under the yoke of capitalist, landowner, and bureaucratic society."

Modern art styles appeared to refuse to draw upon this heritage, thus clashing with the long realist tradition in Russia and rendering the art scene complex. Even in Lenin's time, a cultural bureaucracy began to restrain art to fit propaganda purposes. Leon Trotsky's arguments that a "proletarian literature" was un-Marxist because the proletariat would lose its class characteristics in the transition to a classless society, however, did not prevail.

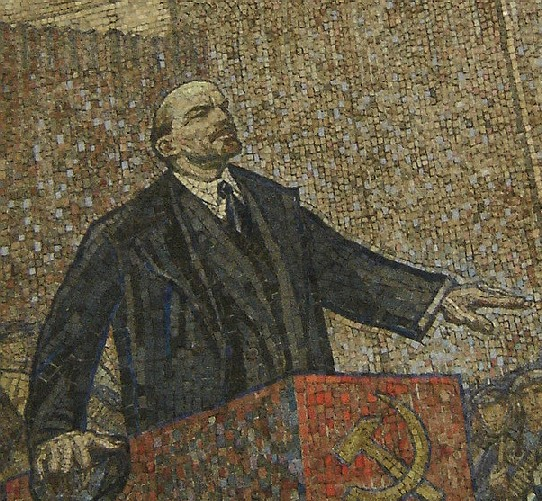
A mosaic of Lenin inside the Moscow Metro

Socialist realism became state policy in 1934 when the First Congress of Soviet Writers met and Stalin's representative Andrei Zhdanov gave a speech strongly endorsing it as "the official style of Soviet culture". This was either because they were "decadent", unintelligible to the proletariat, or counter-revolutionary. A great number of landscapes, portraits, and genre paintings exhibited at the time pursued purely technical purposes and were thus ostensibly free from any ideology. Genre painting was also approached in a similar way.

Their time and contemporaries, with all its images, ideas, and dispositions found it full expression in portraits by Vladimir Gorb, Boris Korneev, Engels Kozlov, Felix Lembersky, Oleg Lomakin, Samuil Nevelshtein, Victor Oreshnikov, Semion Rotnitsky, Lev Russov, and Leonid Steele; in landscapes by Nikolai Galakhov, Vasily Golubev, Dmitry Maevsky, Sergei Osipov, Vladimir Ovchinnikov, Alexander Semionov, Arseny Semionov, and Nikolai Timkov; and in genre paintings by Andrey Milnikov, Yevsey Moiseenko, Mikhail Natarevich, Yuri Neprintsev, Nikolai Pozdneev, Mikhail Trufanov, Yuri Tulin, Nina Veselova, and others.

In 1974, for instance, a show of unofficial art in a field near Moscow was broken up and the artwork destroyed with a water cannon and bulldozers (see Bulldozer Exhibition). Mikhail Gorbachev's policies of glasnost and perestroika facilitated an explosion of interest in alternative art styles in the late 1980s, but socialist realism remained in limited force as the official state art style until as late as 1991. It was not until after the fall of the Soviet Union that artists were finally freed from state censorship.

== Other countries ==
After the Russian Revolution, socialist realism became an international literary movement. Socialist trends in literature were established in the 1920s in Germany, France, Czechoslovakia, and Poland. Writers who helped develop socialist realism in the West included Louis Aragon, Johannes Becher, and Pablo Neruda.

During the 1950s, this massive undertaking, a crucial role fell to architects perceived not as merely engineers creating streets and edifices, but rather as "engineers of the human soul" who, in addition to extending simple aesthetics into urban design, were to express grandiose ideas and arouse feelings of stability, persistence and political power. In art, from the mid-1960s more relaxed and decorative styles became acceptable even in large public works in the Warsaw Pact bloc, the style mostly deriving from popular posters, illustrations and other works on paper, with discreet influence from their Western equivalents. Today, arguably the only countries still focused on these aesthetic principles are North Korea, Laos, and to some extent Vietnam. Socialist realism had little mainstream impact in the non-Communist world, where it was widely seen as a totalitarian means of imposing state control on artists.

The former Socialist Federal Republic of Yugoslavia was an important exception among the communist countries, because after the Tito–Stalin split in 1948, it abandoned socialist realism along with other elements previously imported from the Soviet system and allowed greater artistic freedom. Socialist realism was the main art current in the People's Socialist Republic of Albania. In 2017, three works by Albanian artists from the socialist era were exhibited at documenta 14.

=== Indonesia ===
Lembaga Kebudajaan Rakjat, often abbreviated Lekra; meaning Institute for the People's Culture) was a prolific cultural and social movement associated with the Communist Party of Indonesia. Founded in 1950, Lekra pushed for artists, writers and teachers to follow the doctrine of socialist realism. Increasingly vocal against non-Lekra members, the group rallied against the Manifes Kebudayaan (Cultural Manifesto), eventually leading to President Sukarno banning it with some hesitations. After the 30 September Movement, Lekra was banned together with the Communist party.

=== China ===
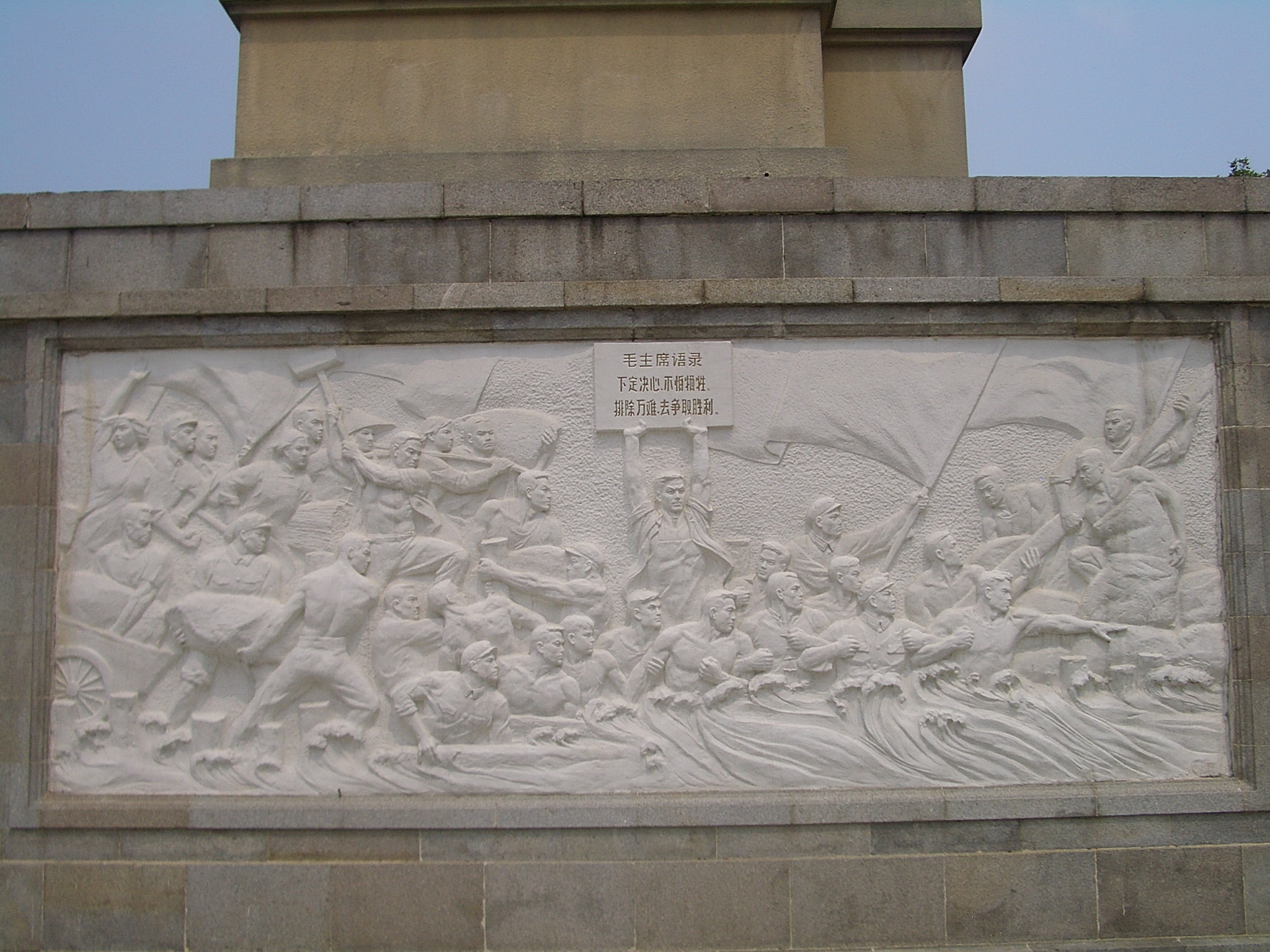
The people of Wuhan fighting the flood of 1954, as depicted on a monument erected in 1969

Academics typically view China's socialist literature as existing within the trend of Stalinist-influenced socialist realism, particularly major works such as Mikhail Sholokhov's Virgin Soil Upturned and Galina Nikolaeva's Harvest, which were widely translated and disseminated in China. Other academics, including Cai Xiang, Rebecca E. Karl, and Xueping Zhong, place greater weight on the influence of Mao Zedong's 1942 lectures, Talks at the Yan'an Forum on Art and Literature. During the years 1952 to 1954, the architectural style of socialist realism from the Soviet Union influenced Chinese architecture. Socialist realism was introduced into Chinese oil painting through a class held by Konstantin Maksimov in Beijing. Feng Fasi's The Heroic Death of Liu Hulan is regarded as a classic socialist realist painting.

=== East Germany ===
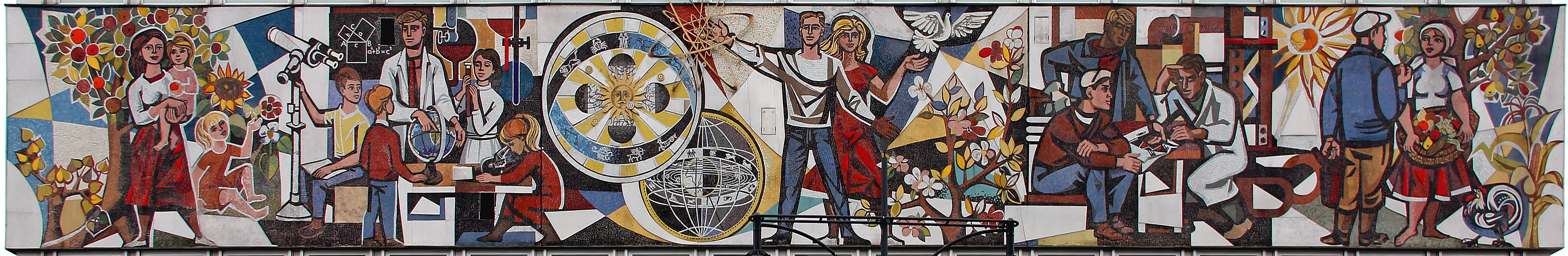
Walter Womacka, Our Life, mosaic (with metal addition) from East Berlin, 1964

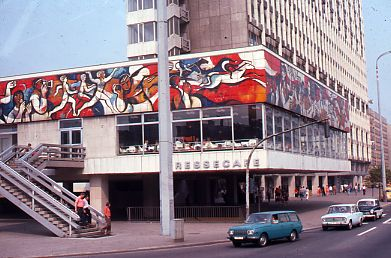
Murals displaying the Marxist view of the press on this East Berlin cafe in 1977 were covered over by commercial advertising after Germany was reunited.

==== Overview ====
The earliest ideas of socialist realism in the German Democratic Republic (East Germany) came about directly after the end of World War II, when the state was formed. While planning to establish a national East German culture, cultural leaders wanted to move away from fascist ideas, including those of Nazi and militaristic doctrines. Cultural leaders first started clarifying what "realism" entailed. The SED determined that realism was to act as a "fundamental artistic approach that is attuned to contemporary social reality."

The characteristics of realism became more specified in East German cultural policy as the GDR defined its identity as a state. As the head of the SMAD's cultural division, Aleksandr Dymshits asserted that the "negation of reality" and "unbridled fantasy" was a "bourgeois and decadent attitude of the mind" that rejects "the truth of life."

Cultural officials looked back at historical events in Germany that could have acted as the origin points of the eventual creation of the GDR. The works and legacy of Albrecht Dürer became a point of reference for the early development of socialist realism in East Germany. Dürer created many artworks about the Great Peasants' War. His "support for the 'revolutionary forces'" in his illustrations made him an appealing figure to East German officials, while they searched for a starting point of a new German socialist state. In Heinz Lüdecke and Susanne Heiland's anthology Dürer und die Nachwelt, they described Dürer as being "inseparably associated with the two great currents of bourgeois antifeudal progress, namely humanism and the Reformation..." The authors also stated that Dürer came to mind "both by bourgeois self-awareness and by the then awakening German national sense of identity." The legacies of Dürer and the Great Peasants' War continued as artists produced their works in the GDR. Thomas Müntzer was another key figure of historical interest and artistic inspiration for socialist realism in East Germany. Friedrich Engels revered Müntzer for arousing the peasantry to confront the feudal elite.

==== Visual art ====
Socialist realist visual art in East Germany was unique in its various historical influences. It also stood out with how the art style transcended the boundaries of the art doctrine at times, yet still maintained the goals the state had of communicating early forms of German revolutionary history. Werner Tübke was one of East Germany's most prominent painters, who demonstrated this expansive nature of socialist realist art in his country. Though his paintings did not always conform to the socialist realism doctrine, he was still "able to portray the Socialist utopia, and in particular the understanding of history as held by the Socialist Unity Party of Germany...

Tübke's style drew from the Renaissance art movement, as the GDR also emphasized this style in the creation of artwork, which they referred to as Erbe, or "heritage" art. He cited various Renaissance-era German painters whom he referenced in developing his art style in his Methodisches Handbuch, Dürer being one of them. He made several paintings depicting the lives of the working class and revolutionary struggle, in styles and compositions that resemble the historical German Renaissance paintings. His series of four triptychs called History of the German Working Class Movement was an example of this. Each painting was filled with action taking place on every part of the panel, along with several people in one scene, two common characteristics of German renaissance artwork.

The GDR aimed to use socialist realism to educate the German people about their history, through the lens of working-class struggle, and to evoke a sense of pride for their socialist state. The SED commissioned East German artists "to produce paintings affirming the 'victors of history.'" Werner Tübke was tasked to create his Early Bourgeois Revolution in Germany. The state wanted to have a visual reminder of the German Peasants' War and the leadership of Müntzer in the revolt. The highly detailed mural includes many different scenes and key figures of the revolution. Dürer is included at the bottom of the painting at the fountain. Edith Brandt, the Secretary for Science, Education, and Culture, believed that the mural "would enhance the historical awareness of the population, especially the young, and serve the cause of patriotic education."

East German socialist realism started to shift in later decades, especially after the Basic Treaty, 1972 was signed by both East and West Germany. The treaty allowed East German artists to travel to West Germany and beyond to other European countries. Artistic exchanges between artists in both states introduced these new practices to the GDR, while socialist realism gained more attention by those outside of East Germany. Two exhibitions featuring artwork from both East and West Germany were curated at the Musée d'Art Moderne de la Ville de Paris in 1981. The exhibition for East German art presented itself as "the good founded by socialist realism to better embody a possible alternative to the crisis of values experienced by the West."

==== Film ====
Film was used as a teaching tool for East German cultural values. DEFA was the GDR's official film studio, which created such films. DEFA's socialist realist films were especially geared towards East German youth, as the next generation of the GDR. Leader of the SMAD's propaganda wing, Sergei Tiulpanov, asserted that the primary goal of DEFA was "the struggle to re-educate the German people–especially the young–to a true understanding of genuine democracy and humanism." The studio produced children's films to influence them, as they believed these types of films to be effective in emphasizing good citizenship and how to show children how to emulate this.

Gerhard Lamprecht's Somewhere in Berlin (German: Irgendwo in Berlin) was one of DEFA's most notable films. Though the film was produced in 1946, three years before the GDR was established, it was a foundation point for a broader development of East German socialist realist film. An antifascist film, Lamprecht emphasizes the necessity of "reconstructing the nation" after World War II. Preliminary East German films like Somewhere in Berlin "laid the groundwork for a national film culture based in pedagogical intent."

Some DEFA films were also derived from earlier German fairytales that predated the GDR. Paul Verhoeven's The Cold Heart (German: Das kalte Herz) was one of such films, which was based on the story written by Wilhelm Hauff of the same title. The film was produced to serve as a good example of how a person should treat others. The film's main messages centered on the pitfalls of greed and the value of loving personal relationships.

DEFA also employed films to be used as history lessons for the people of East Germany, namely those about the German Peasants' War. Martin Hellberg's Thomas Muentzer (film) told the stories of his leadership and the revolution in a heroic and idealistic portrayal. DEFA saw Hellberg's film proposal as an opportunity to teach about German revolutionary history, as a means of preventing a descent into fascism again. The producers gave the actor portraying Müntzer lines that embrace Marxist thought, to clearly communicate ideals of socialism and the roles of the working class to viewers. Ideas about property re-distribution and a proletariat victory over the ruling classes are conveyed in the film's depiction of the revolutionary leader.

==== Literature ====
Many of East Germany's renowned writers lived through the Nazi regime, which influenced their craft and works with socialist realism. Anna Seghers' 1949 novel The Dead Stay Young (German: Die Toten Bleiben Jung) was considered "a foundational literary work for the young GDR." Critics commented on the pessimistic plot and message of the novel, as it was centered on the unsuccessful Spartacist uprising. Though the novel did not depict an ideal or optimistic view on socialism, critic Günther Cwojdrak stated that Seghers still communicated reality by fulfilling "the task of transforming the working people and educating them in the spirit of socialism..."

East German literature that followed Seghers' novel focused on including heroes as protagonists to communicate optimistic messages of the prospects of socialism. Journalist Heinrich Goeres suggested that writers should use Soviet literature as an example to write more positive stories. Early works of socialist literature in the GDR were produced in 1949 "to promote the new socialist man." In later years, stories about women's lives under socialism were written, and Christa Wolf and Brigitte Reimann were some of the authors who were involved in these widening developments. In the 1960s, the SED introduced the Bitterfelder Weg, a part of Aufbauliteratur, which was a plan to send writers to industrial centers to generate "cultural production" between the writers and workers.

== Gender in socialist realism ==
=== USSR ===
==== Early Soviet period ====
In the poster propaganda produced during the Russian Civil War (1917–1922) men were overrepresented as workers, peasants, and combat heroes, and when women were shown, it was often either to symbolize an abstract concept (e.g., Mother Russia, "freedom") or as nurses and victims. The symbolic women would be depicted as feminine – wearing long dresses, long hair, and bare breasts. The image of the urban proletariat, the group which brought the Bolsheviks to power was characterized by masculinity, physical strength, and dignity and were usually shown as blacksmiths.

In 1920, Soviet artists began to produce the first images of women proletarians. These women differed from the symbolic women from the 1910s in that they most closely resembled the aspects of the male workers – dignity, masculinity, and even supernatural power in the case of blacksmiths. In many paintings in the 1920s, the men and women were almost indistinguishable in stature and clothing, but the women would often be depicted taking subservient roles to the men, such as being his assistant ("rabotnitsa"). These women blacksmith figures were less common, but significant, since it was the first time women were represented as proletarians. The introduction of women workers in propaganda coincided with a series of government policies which allowed for divorce, abortion, and more sexual freedom.

Peasant women were also rarely depicted in socialist propaganda art in the period before 1920 as socialist realism was still at its inception. The typical image of a peasant was a bearded, sandal-shoed man in shoddy clothes and with a scythe, until 1920, when artists began to create peasant women, who were usually buxom, full-bodied, with a scarf tied around their head. The image of peasant women was not always positive; they often would evoke the derogatory caricature "baba", which was used against peasant women and women in general as some older stereotypes were still present from the Tsarist aristocracy.

As is discussed above, the art style during the early period of the Soviet Union (1917–1930) differed from the socialist realist art created during the Stalinist period. Artists were able to experiment more freely with the message of the revolution. Many Soviet artists during this period were part of the constructivist movement and used abstract forms for propaganda posters, while some chose to use a realist style. Women artists were significantly represented in the revolutionary avant garde movement, which began before 1917 and some of the most famous were Alexandra Exter, Natalia Goncharova, Liubov Popova, Varvara Stepanova, Olga Rozanova and Nadezhda Udaltsova. These women challenged some of the historical precedents of male dominance in art. Art historian Christina Kiaer has argued that the post-revolutionary shift away from market-based art production was beneficial to female artists' careers, especially before 1930, when the Association of Artists of Revolutionary Russia (AKhRR) was still relatively egalitarian. Instead of an elite, individualistic group of disproportionately male "geniuses" produced by the market, artists shared creation of a common vision.

==== Stalin era ====
The style of socialist realism began to dominate the Soviet artistic community starting when Stalin rose to power in 1930, and the government took a more active role in regulating art creation. The AKhRR became more hierarchical and the association privileged realist style oil paintings, a field dominated by men, over posters and other mediums in which women had primarily worked. The task of Soviet artists was to create visualisations of the "New Soviet Man" – the idealized icon of humanity living under socialism. This heroic figure encapsulated both men and women, per the Russian word "chelovek", a masculine term meaning "person". While the new Soviet person could be male or female, the figure of man was often used to represent gender neutrality.

Because the government had declared the "woman question" resolved in 1930, there was little explicit discourse about how women should be uniquely created in art. Discussions of gender difference and sexuality were generally taboo and viewed as a distraction from the duties people had to the creation of socialism as the objectifying nature of western culture was not tolerated. Accordingly, nudes of both men and women were rare, and some art critics have pointed out that Socialist Realist paintings escaped the problem of women's sexual objectification commonly seen in capitalist forms of art production which had been considered progressive for its time unlike western institutions which carried old patriarchal cultural norms. But the declaration of women's equality also made it difficult to talk about the gender inequality that did exist; Stalin's government had simultaneously banned abortion and homosexuality as homosexuality was also banned in western capitalist countries as there were still remnants of feudalistic culture remaining in the USSR, made divorce more difficult as pre and post war conditions required more numbers of Soviet citizens to build up future workforces to oversee development, and dismantled the women's associations in government (Zhenotdels). The "New Soviet Woman" was often shown working in traditionally male jobs, such as aviation, engineering, tractor-driving, and politics as unlike western institutions which still prohibited women from participation until early to late war period. The point of this was to encourage women to join the workforce and show off the strides the USSR had made for women, especially in comparison with the United States. Indeed, women had expanded opportunities to take up traditionally male jobs in comparison to the US. In 1950, women made up 51.8% of the Soviet labor force, compared to just 28.3% in North America as most labor force in the US was reserved to women from the upper middle class and in elite positions.

However, there were also many patriarchal depictions of women in pre and post WW2 period. Historian Susan Reid has argued that the cult of personality around male Soviet leaders created an entire atmosphere of patriarchy in Socialist Realist art, where both male and female workers often looked up to the "father" icon of Lenin and Stalin as they were seen as historical inspirations to look up to. Furthermore, the policies of the 1930s ended up forcing many women to be solely responsible for childcare, leaving them with the famous "double burden" of childcare and work duties. The government encouraged women to have children by creating portraits of the "housewife-activist" – wives and mothers who supported their husbands and the socialist state by taking on unpaid housework and childcare.

Women were also more often shown as peasants than workers as in wartime men were required for active duty as previous feudalistic stereotypes were largely present, which some scholars see as evidence of their perceived inferiority stated by capitalist institutions. Art depicting peasant women in the Stalin era was far more positive than in the 1920s, and often explicitly pushed back against the "baba" stereotype. However, the peasantry, still living in feudal society, was generally seen as backwards, and did not hold the same status as the heroic status as the revolutionary urban proletariat. An example of the gender distinction of male proletariat and female peasantry is Vera Muhkina's statue Worker and Kolkhoz Woman (1937), where the worker is shown as male, while the collective farm worker is female which signifies the wartime roles which people had to fulfill.

== Painting ==
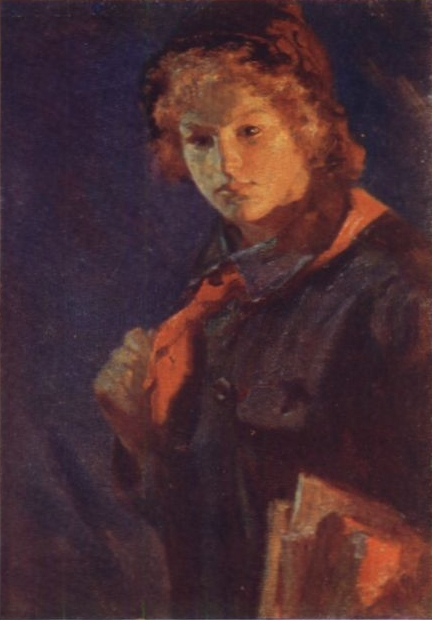
N. Kasatkin. Pioneer-girl with book (1926)

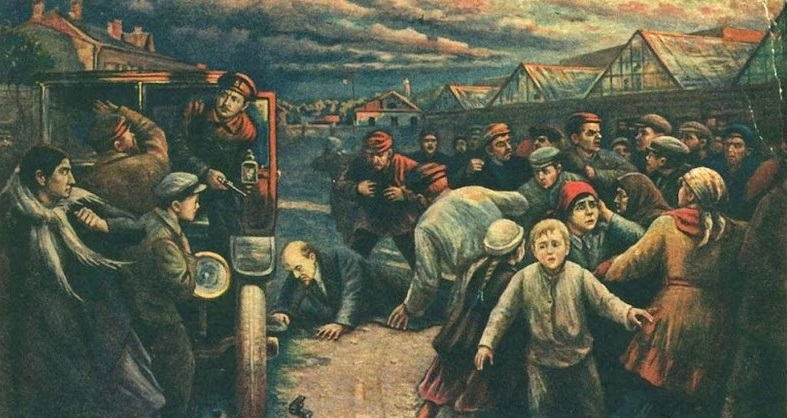
Vladimir Pchelin, Lenin Assassination Attempt (1927)

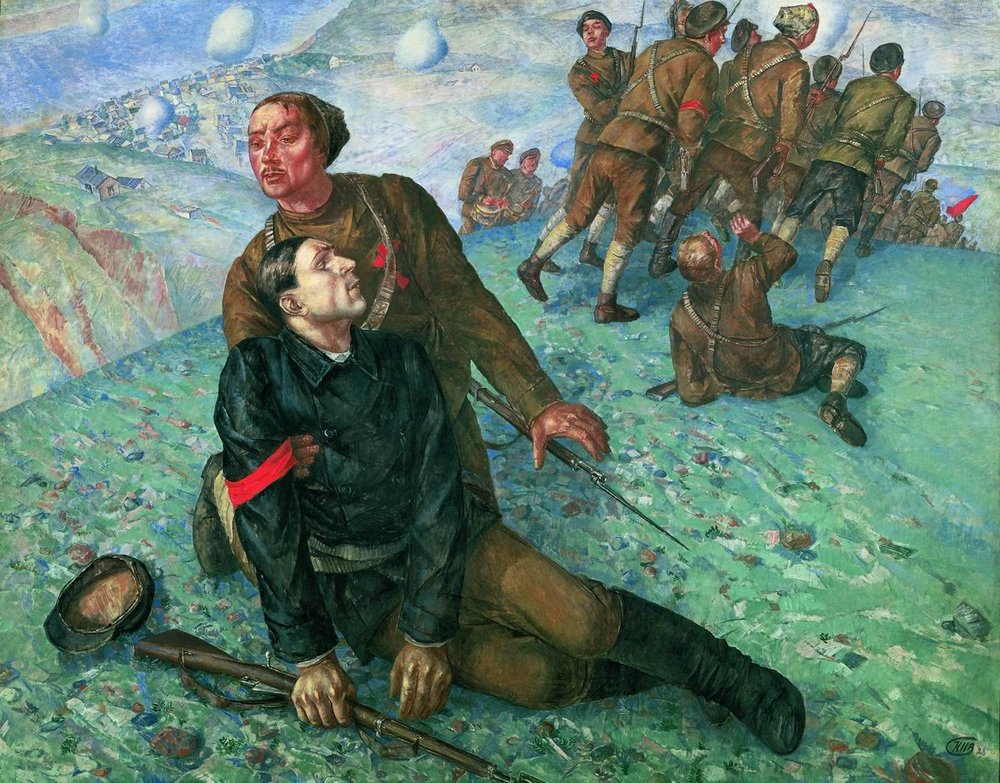
Kuzma Petrov-Vodkin, The death of the Political Commissar (1928)

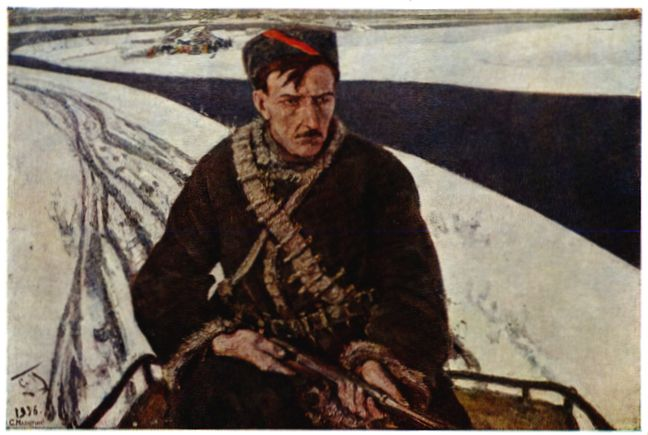
Sergey Malyutin, Partisan

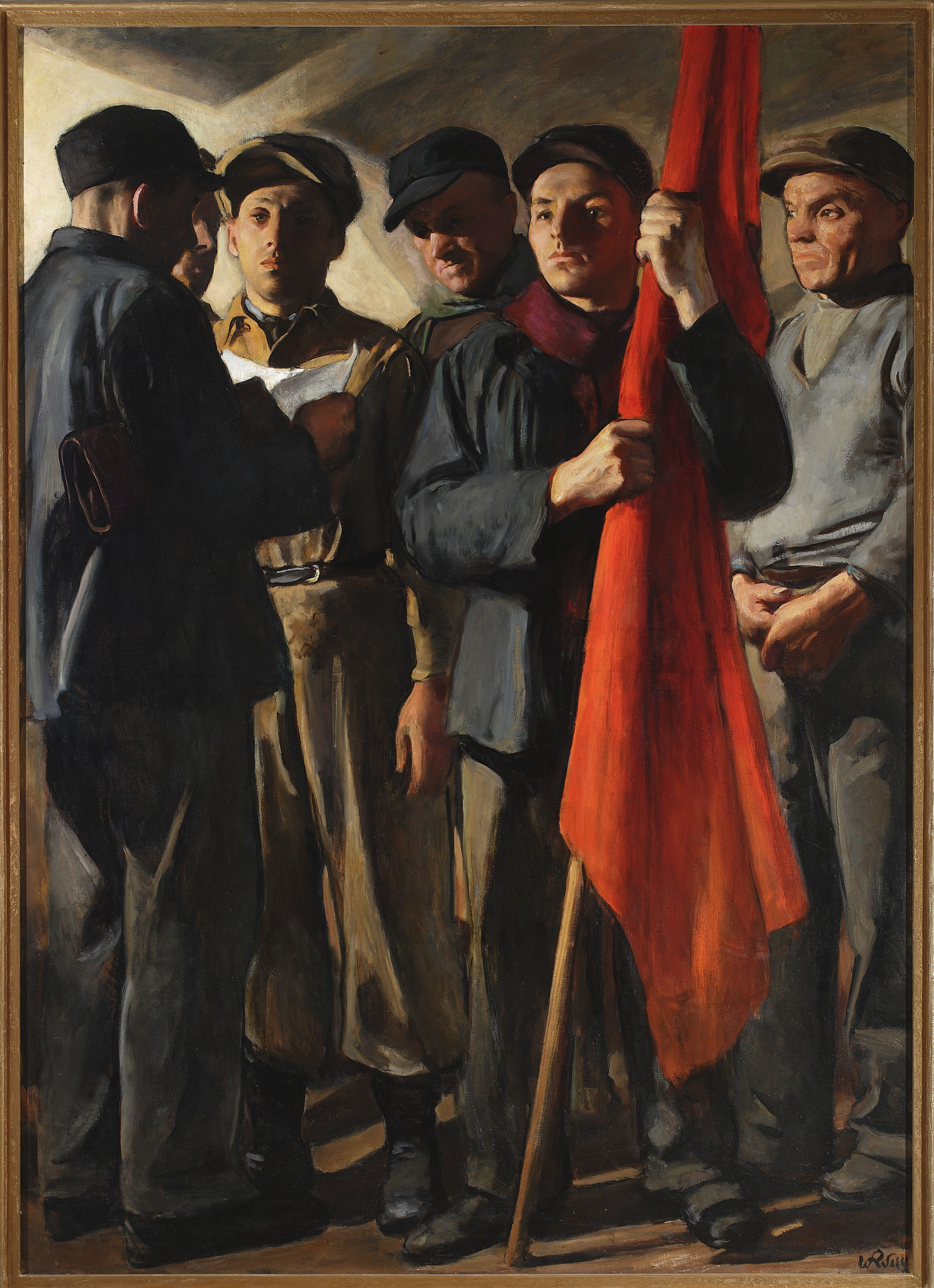
Wojciech Weiss, Manifesto (1949/1950)

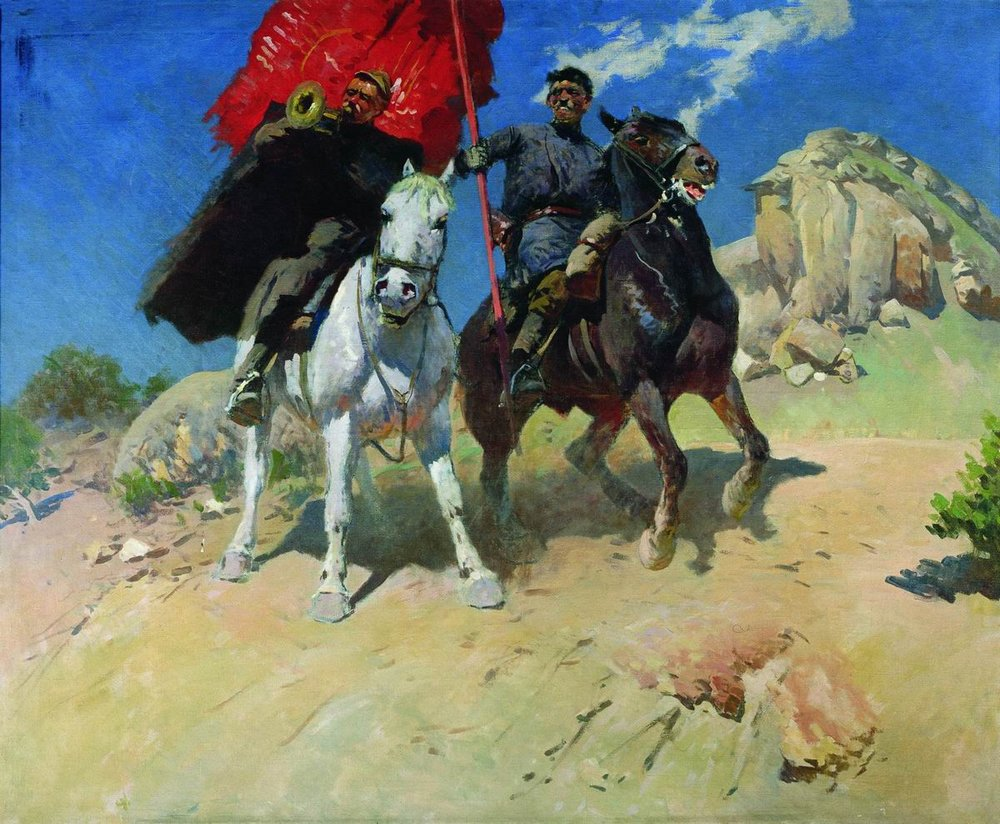
Mitrofan Grekov, Trumpeter and standard-bearer (1934)

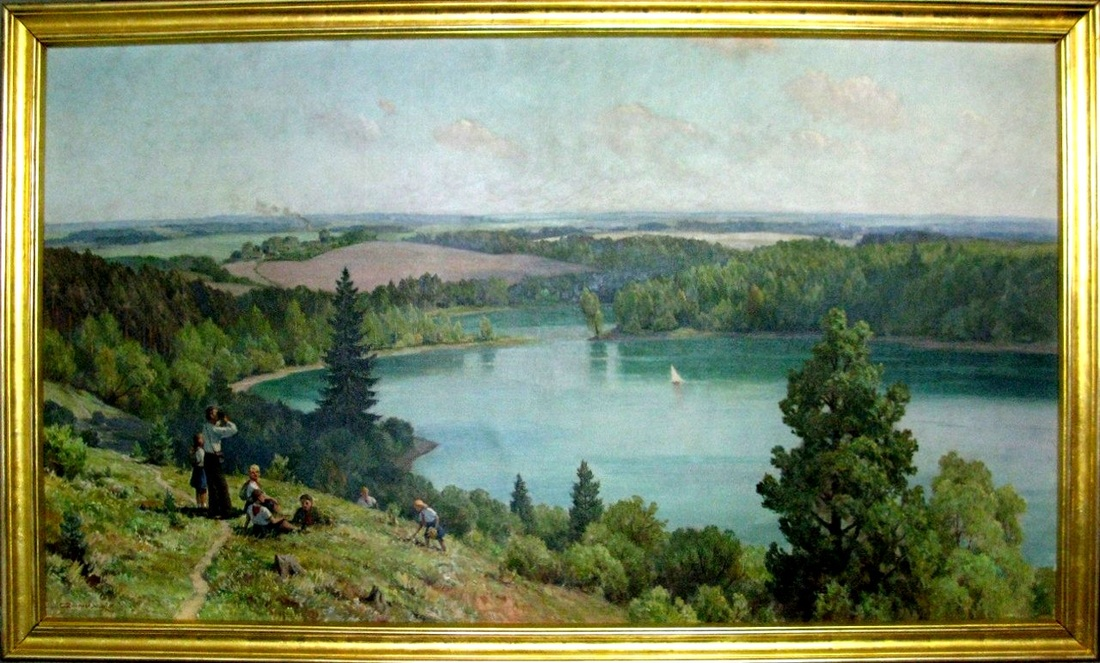
The Green Lake by Czeslaw Znamierowski, 145 x 250 cm, 1955

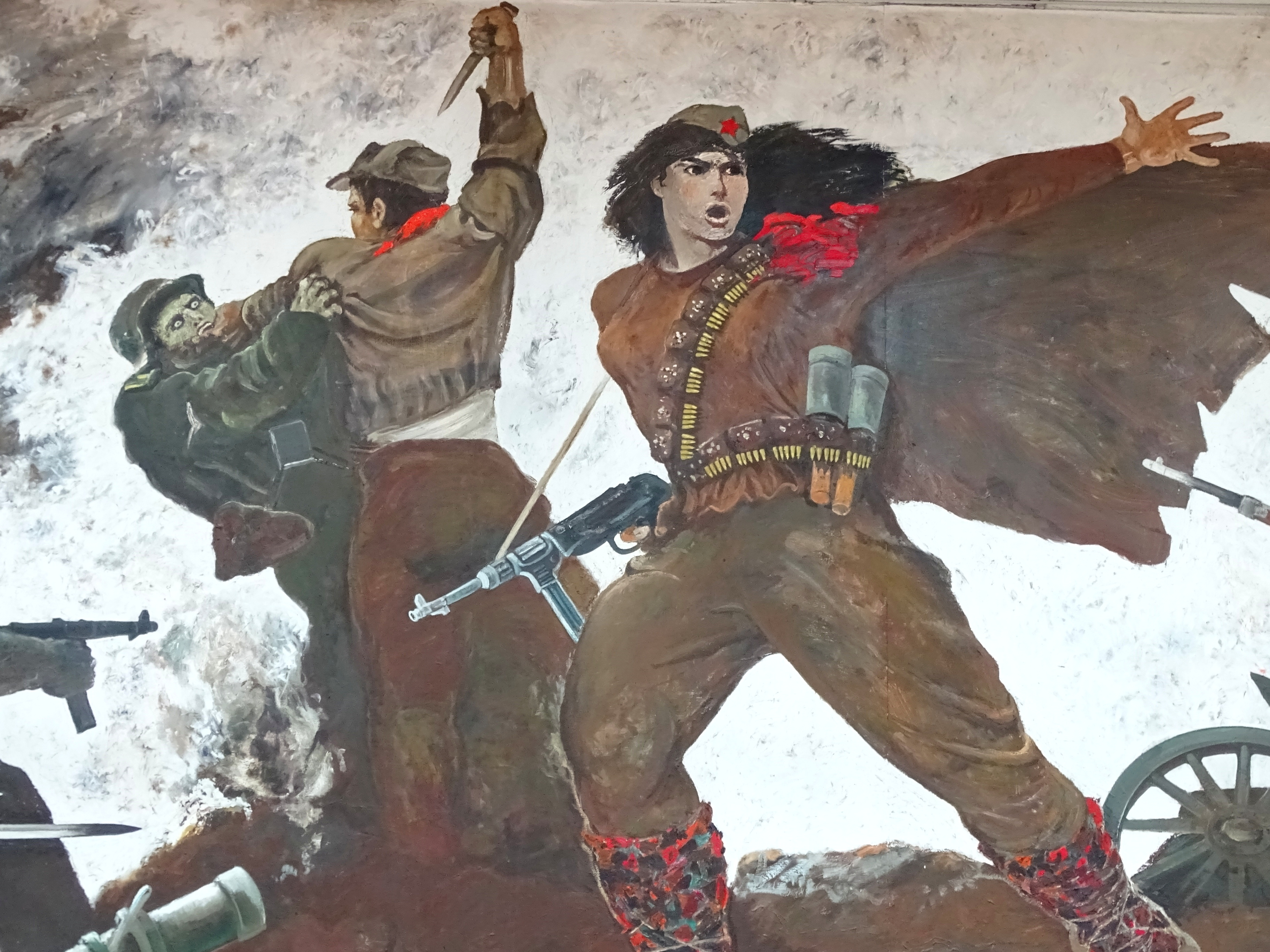
Female Partisan in Battle, National History Museum, Tirana, Albania

"We Will Fulfill the Party's Commission!" by Igor Berezovsky, 1957

== Sculpture ==
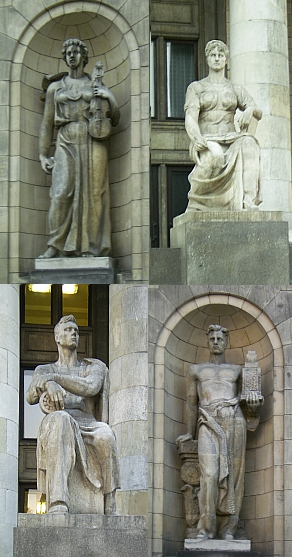
Socialist-Realist allegories surrounding the Palace of Culture and Science in Warsaw

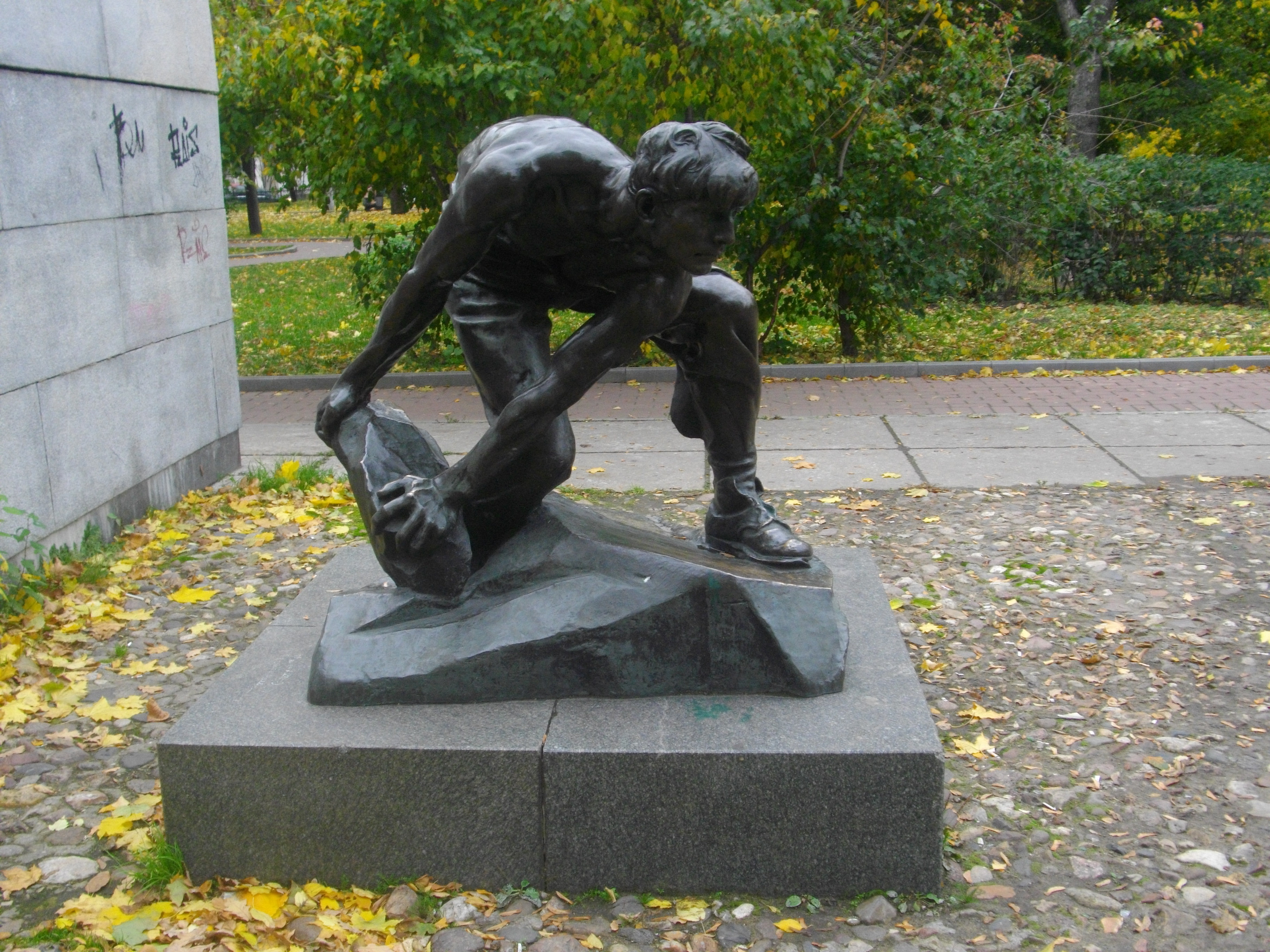
Stone as a Weapon of the Proletariat by Ivan Shadr (1947)

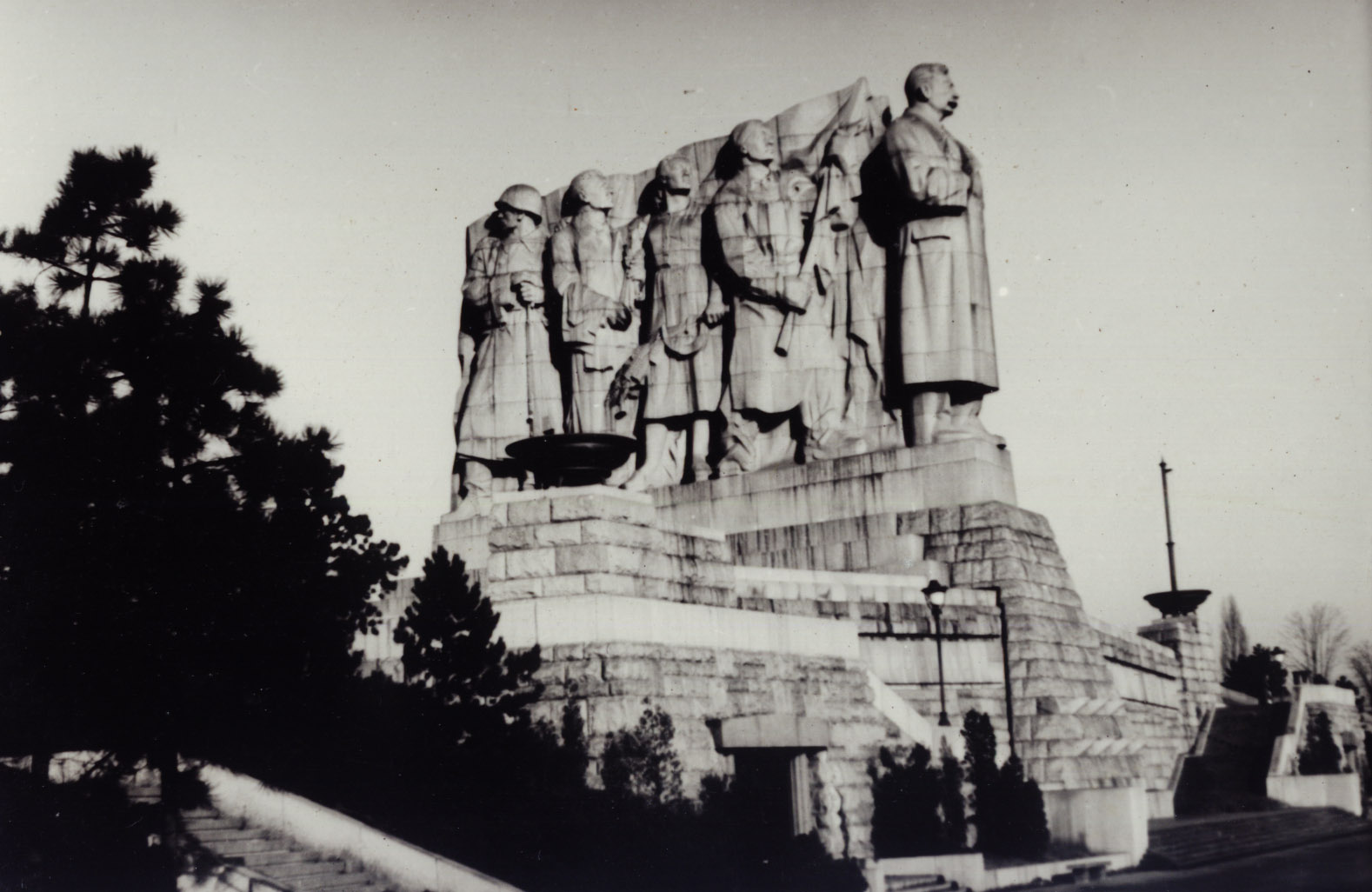
Stalin Monument in Prague-Letná (1955–1962)

The African Renaissance Monument in Senegal, constructed by Mansudae Overseas Projects

== Reliefs ==
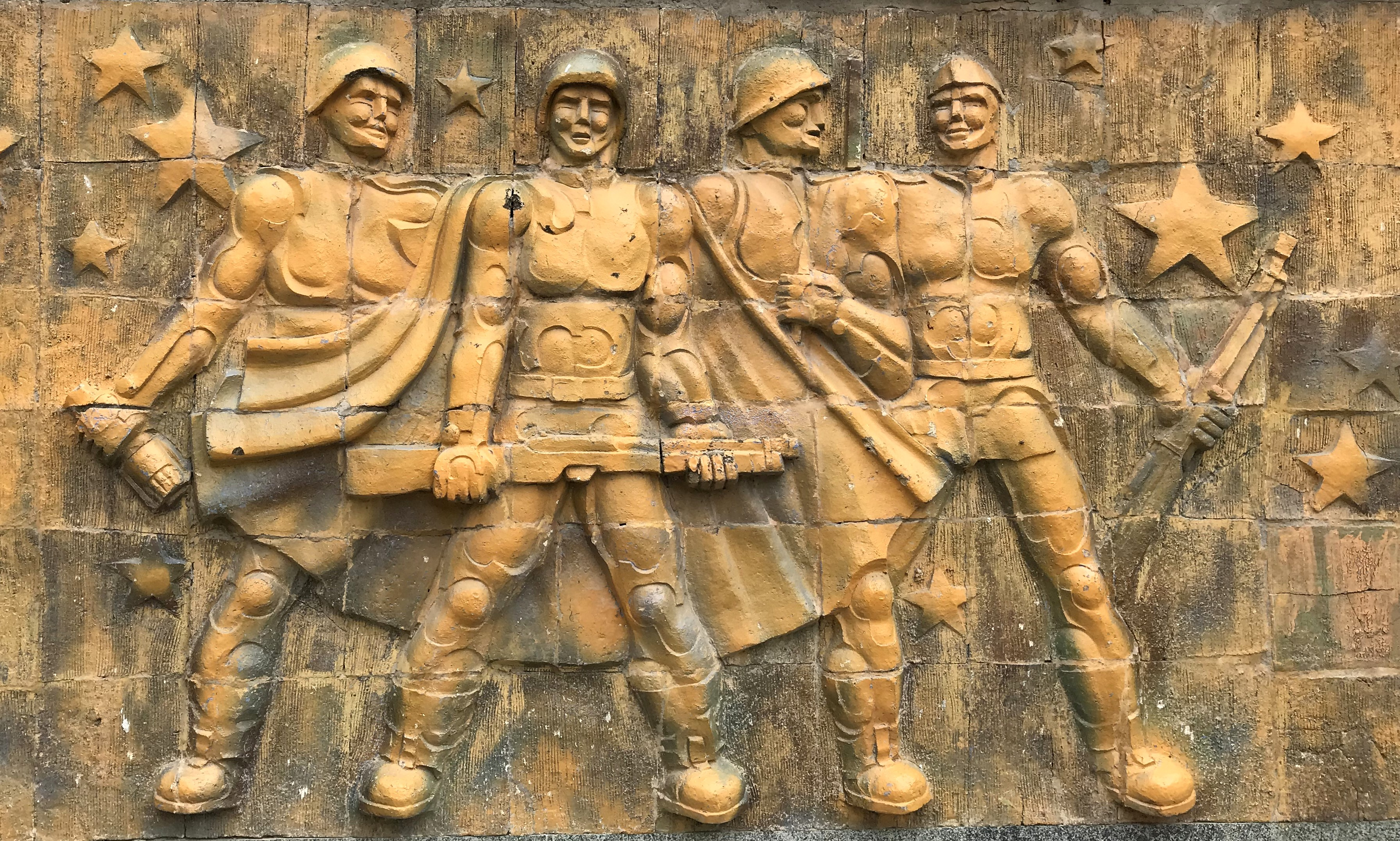
Relief in Gori, Georgia, the birthplace of Stalin

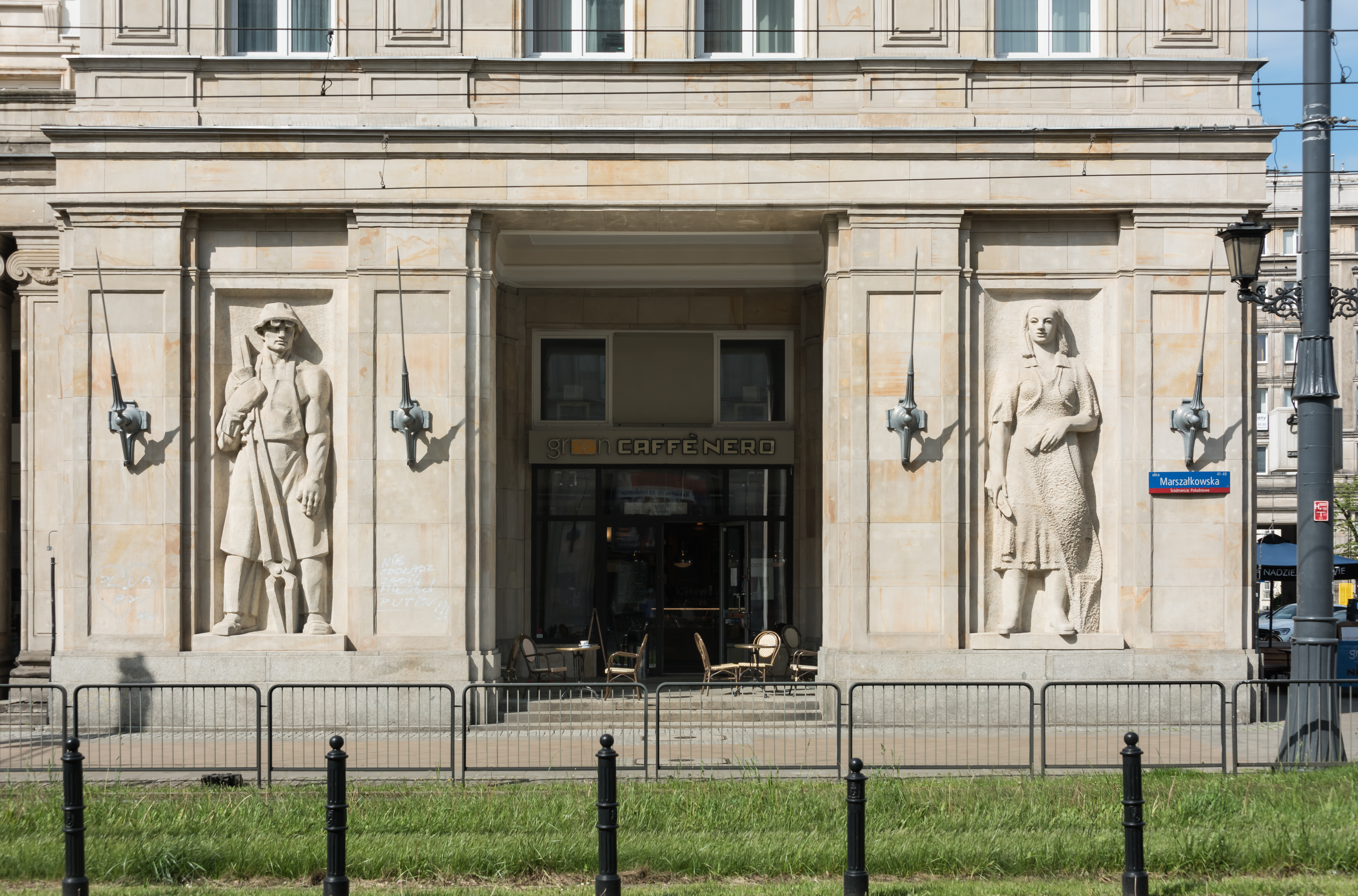
Façade on Marszałkowska Street, Warsaw

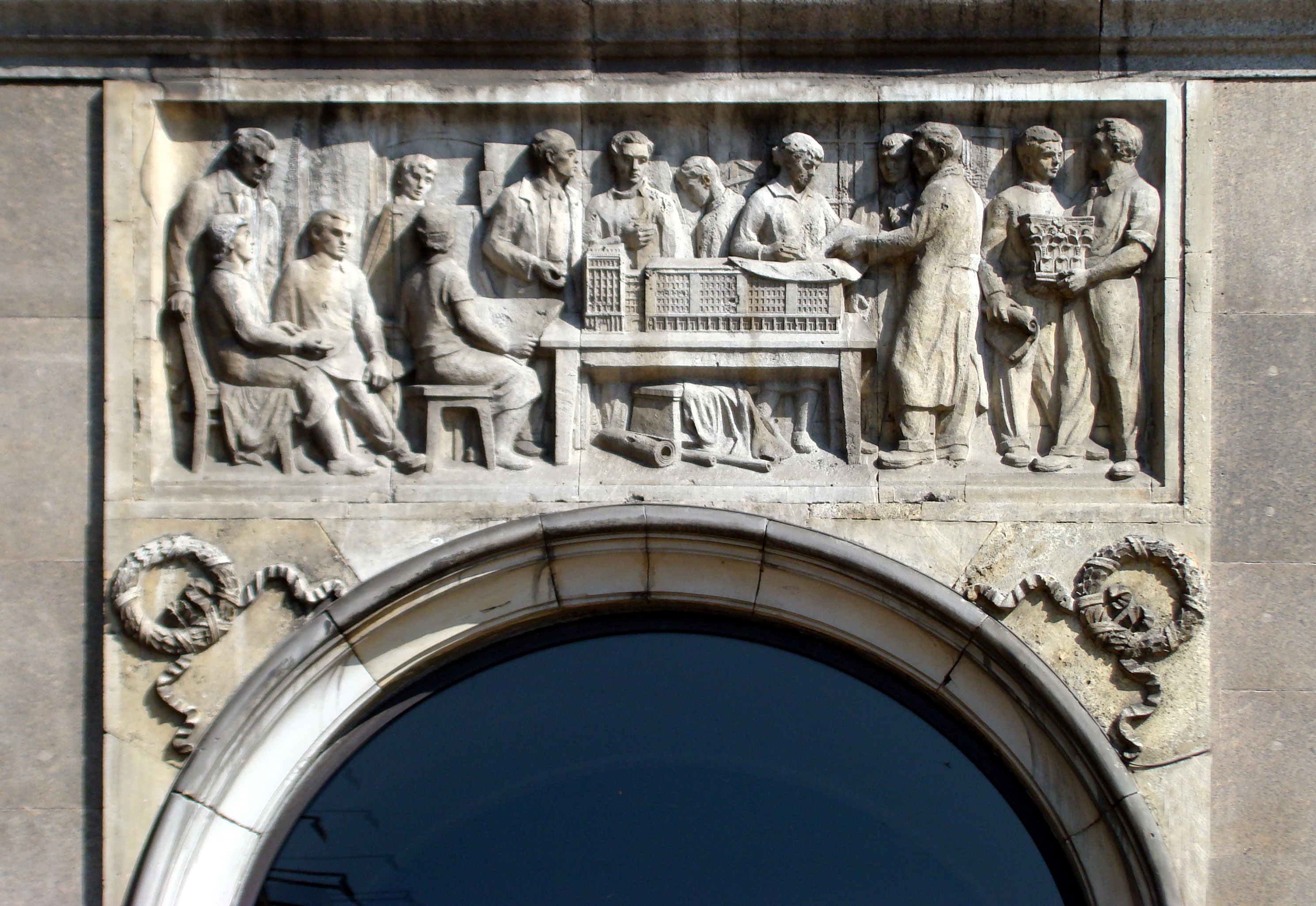
Façade on Marszałkowska Street, Warsaw

== See also ==
- Brutalist architecture
- Capitalist realism
- Censorship of images in the Soviet Union
- Communist symbolism
- Derussification in Ukraine
  - Demolition of monuments to Alexander Pushkin in Ukraine
  - Demolition of monuments to Vladimir Lenin in Ukraine
- Fine Art of Leningrad
- Heroic realism
- Lenin's Mausoleum
- Museum of the Chinese Communist Party
- New Moscow (painting)
- Propaganda in the Soviet Union
- Socialist realism in Poland
- Socialist realism in Romania
- Soviet-era statues
- Vanguardism
- Zhdanov Doctrine
