= Wieslaw Borkowski =

Polish artist

Wieslaw Borkowski Jr. (born 10 February 1989 in Kroscienko nad Dunajcem), also known as Baiwei (Chinese: 白伟; pinyin: Báiwěi), is a Polish sinologist-artist, painter and calligrapher. In his work, he combines cultures of Far East and West, traditional art and virtual reality.

== Life ==
He studied Sinology at Warsaw University while simultaneously mastering Chinese painting and calligraphy as an apprentice for Polish artist, Stanislaw Tworzydlo. He graduated from China Academy of Art in Hangzhou, MA program at the Department of Traditional Chinese Painting, focusing in figural painting. In June 2015 he was awarded the Grand Prix for the best graduate artwork for his painting "Dialogue Between Apsara and Angel". This achievement made him the first foreign student in the history of the faculty to be granted this honor.

== Exhibitions ==
=== Selected individual exhibitions ===
2018 – "Exodus" Hangzhou, China

2016 – "Feeling and Observation" Ningbo Cultural Plaza, China

2016 – "Influx" Hangzhou Library Exhibition Space, China

2015 – "Homescapes", Consulate General of the Republic of Poland, Shanghai, China

2015 – "A Dialogue: Chopin and Pipa Dream”, Sanlang Art Dimension, China

2012 – Exhibition at Zhejiang University, Hangzhou, China

=== Selected group exhibitions ===
2017 – "Four Phases of Ink" Manggha Museum of Japanese Art & Technology, Krakow, Poland

2017 – "Ink Painting Ideology" International Contemporary Art Fair, Sanya, China

2016 – The Fifth Graduates’ Art Expo, Guangzhou, China

2016 – "Rare Assembly" E-Moderne Gallerie, Philadelphia, USA

2016 – "Bodyspace" Hangzhou Library Exhibition Space, China

2015 – "Thousand-Year Narratives", CAA Museum, China
