= Osip Beskin =

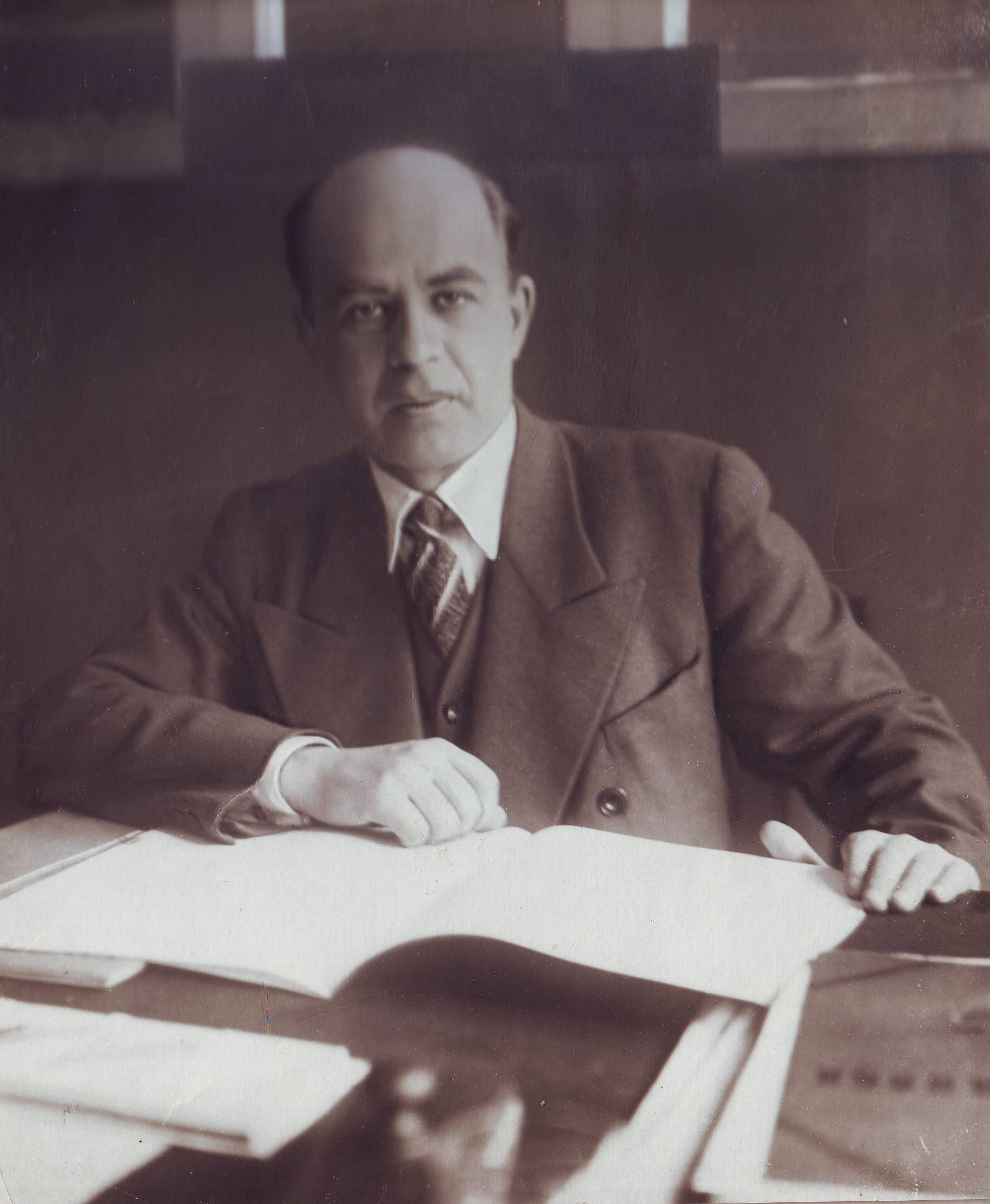
1930s

Osip Beskin (Russian: Осип Мартынович Бескин; October 30 [O.S. November 11] 1892 – August 21, 1969) was a Russian and then Soviet art scholar and writer. He edited several magazines, such as Soviet Cinema among others, and led the official campaign against “formalists” within the Soviet painters in the 1930s.

== Biography ==
Osip Beskin was born in Vilno (Vilnius), a second-guild merchant (later a tax collector) Meer Izrailevich (Martyn Yakovlevich, 1851-1904) and Ekaterina Samoilovna Beskin. He had sisters Mina (born in 1879), Pelageya (born in 1883), and Elena (born in 1886), and brothers Abram (a pharmacist), Emmanuel (later a theater critic), and Mikhail (a poet, playwright, journalist, and literary editor).

He graduated from the economics department of the Kyiv Commercial Institute. Member of the RCP(b) — VKP(b) (in 1919-1949 and since 1950).

Beskin started his career in the Russian Empire by becoming secretary of the "Theater Newspaper" (1916-1918).

After the October revolution, Beskin became the head of the Moscow City Department of Education and member of the Moscow City Council (1920-1921).

Then he resorted to writing and editing, becoming member of the board of the State Publishing House (1923-1925); chairman of the editorial and publishing department of the Main Political Education Department and editor-in-chief of the magazine "Soviet Cinema" (1926-1928); Scientific Secretary of the Institute of Literature and Art of the Communist Academy (1929-1931).

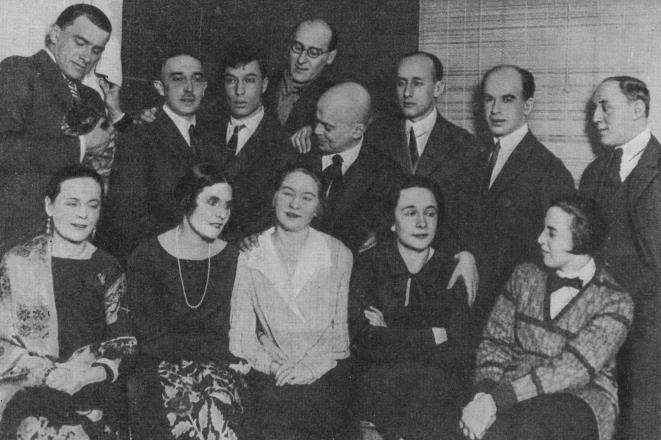
Vladimir Mayakovsky after return from USA in 1925. Seated, from left to right: Elsa Triole, Lilya Brik, R. S. Kushner, E. V. Pasternak, O. V. Tretyakova. Standing: Mayakovsky, Osip Brik, Boris Pasternak, Sergei Tretyakov, Viktor Shklovsky, Lev Grinkrug, O. M. Beskin, P. V. Neznamov.

In 1931-32, Beskin had a brief period in Voronezh, as he became Rector of the newly opened Voronezh Agrarian and Pedagogical Institute (1931-1932).

Returning to Moscow, Beskin became Editor-in-Chief of the State Publishing House of Fine Arts (Izogiz) (1932-1934), Chief Inspector of the People's Commissariat of Education of the RSFSR for Fine Arts (1934-1936), simultaneously editor-in-chief of the magazines “Art and Creativity” (1932-1940), director and editor-in-chief of the publishing house “Art” (1936-1938).

== Campaign against Formalism in Painting in 1930s ==
In 1932, Joseph Stalin decided to unite all writers, composers, painters and sculptors and theater artists in state-controlled artists unions to make them follow the compulsory method of Socialist realism. After Stalin initiated the Politburo resolution "On the Restructuring of Literary and Artistic Organizations" on April 23, 1932, the Moscow Union of Soviet Artists and similar unions were promptly created in Leningrad and in all Soviet republics, with mandatory membership for all painters and sculptors, to “direct art toward the goals set by the Party.”.

The next task was to combat all dissenters within the artists’s unions who would not limit their creativity to the compulsory method of Socialist realism and stuck to different art schools and values.

To fight them, in 1932 the Central Committee selected Osip Beskin, a literary critic of the former RAPP (Russian Association of Proletarian Writers), who was known for the tireless search and exposure of disguised enemies of Soviet power in the sphere of literature in the 1920s, most of whom (poets Sergey Klychkov, Nikolai Klyuev, Pyotr Oreshin, writer Alexander Voronsky) were eventually executed in 1937-1938. Beskin was appointed Chief inspector of the People's Commissariat for Education for fine arts, and director of “Izogiz” - the state publishing house of literature on art, and editor-in-chief of the magazines “Art” («Искусство») and “Creativity” («Творчество») which were created due to the same resolution of the Politburo of 1932. In 1933, Osip Beskin published the book “Formalism in Painting”, which became a guide to identifying and exposing formalist artists.

== During the war ==
- Director of the exhibition "The Second Great Patriotic War" in the Directorate of Art Exhibitions and Panoramas (1942-1943)
- Senior Consultant on Creative Issues of the Moscow Association of Artists (1943-1946)

== Post-war years ==
- Artistic Director and Editor-in-Chief of the Association of Artists "Soviet Graphic" (1946-1948)
- Artistic Director for the Production of Prints of the Graphic Works Combine (1954-1963).

== Main writings ==
- “Kulak literature and opportunistic criticism”. Moscow, 1930, 1931 (2nd edition) (Кулацкая художественная литература и оппортунистическая критика. Москва, 1930, 1931)
- “The creative path of Mayakovsky”. Voronezh, 1931 (Творческий путь Маяковского. Воронеж, 1931)
- ”Formalism in painting”. Moscow, Vsekohudozhnik Editions, 1933 (Бескин, Осип Мартынович. «Формализм в живописи». Москва, издательство «Всекохудожник», 1933)
- The Hero artist. Moscow, 1956
- Ekaterina Belashova. Moscow, 1958
- Yuri Pimenov. Moscow, 1960
- Victor Shestakov. Moscow, 1965
- Georgy Echeistov. Moscow, 1969

== Family life ==
- Osip Beskin had romantic relationship with actress Veronika Polonsky, who was poet Vladimir Mayakovsky’s lover.
- Beskin’s official wife was Galina Porshneva (1911—2003)
