= Bai Wei (writer) =

Chinese writer, born 1894

Bai Wei (白薇) was the pen name of Huang Zhang (黄彰), born in 1894 in Zixing (资兴), in the south-east of Hunan. She also went by other pen names, including Li, Ying, Su Ru, Chong, Laokao, Sufei, Lady Baiwei, Huang Yufa and Lady Suru. Bai Wei was a revolutionary playwright, poet, and fiction and essay writer. Most of her notable works were plays.

In a revolutionary context that was turned towards national defense and patriotic discourses and writings, Bai Wei's literary works deal with feminist themes such as the struggle for independence or sexual freedom. Her radical and feminist stance in her plays was praised by critiques.

Bai Wei's most outstanding plays include Lin Li (1926) and Breaking Out of the Ghost’s Tower (Da chu you ling ta (打出幽灵塔), 1928). Her autobiographical novel, My Tragic Life (Beiju shengya (悲剧生涯), 1936) stood out for depicting her tragic emotional and physical experience in her ten-year relationship with the poet Yang Sao, including her battle against the venereal disease syphilis and poverty. This novel, although very personal, is a political emblem of the oppression of women and their bodies in the patriarchal society and the institution of marriage.

== Biography ==
=== Early life ===
Bai Wei was born in Zixing in a family of supporters of the late Qing Dynasty reform movement. She was influenced at a young age by her progressive parents. However, her parents pre-arranged her marriage and Bai Wei ended up married at the age of sixteen in 1910. For the following years, she suffered tyranny from her mother-in-law and her husband. She finally managed to run away and enter Hengyang Third normal school. She was soon expelled because of her political activism and was thereafter accepted at Changsha's first women's normal school. In 1918, Bai Wei's father, in order make her come back to her husband conspired with school officials. For this reason Bai Wei did not wait for her graduation to flee from the school’s guarded campus by crawling through an old sewer line. She managed to get to Shanghai and from there sailed to Japan to start a new life and continue her studies.

When she arrived in Tokyo she found herself without a penny as her father refused to support her financially. She did not return home and became self-sufficient by becoming a maid for British missionaries. In her early years, she also worked as a waitress and a labourer at the port.

At that time she adopted her pen name Bai Wei as a representation of the adversities she faced to become a liberated woman. Bai stands for in vain, no purpose, and emptiness. It represents the woman's condition and its associated misery. Wei is a species of fern often found in the countryside.

She eventually obtained a scholarship to study at Tokyo's Women Higher Normal University where she majored in biology. There, she met the future playwright Tian Han. Before this encounter, Bai Wei did not receive any formal training in literature nor had a special interest in literature. Tian Han started helping Bai Wei to learn English and also introduced her to the work of Henrik Ibsen. Bai Wei found herself overwhelmed by Ibsen's play A Doll’s House. Although not keeping contact with Tian Han, Bai Wei developed a strong interest for literature and more especially for drama. She read the works of Shakespeare, August Strindberg, Gerhart Hauptmann, and Maurice Maeterlinck. She found in literature a way to examine real-life and a way to fight social injustice. It was only three months after her literary familiarization that she started writing her first play. The following two decades were the most prolific of her life.

Two distinct eras hierarchized her literary works. The first one was characterized by romantic tragedy and themes of love while the second one addressed themes of class conflict and national revolution. Her writing style evolved from romanticism to realism.

=== Early career: Romantic tragedy. ===
Her writing career began with the three-act play Sufei completed in 1922. The play's plot deals with a young woman who breaks free from a pre-arranged marriage and later faces the revenge of the man to whom she was engaged.

This play was followed by a poetry and romantic tragedy called Linli published in the Shanghai Commercial press in 1925. The story revolves around a love triangle between the dancer Linli, the musician Qinlan and her friend Lili. The play was well received in Japan and China and brought fame to Bai Wei. It received positive reviews from critics and the well-known writer Chen Xiying portrayed Bai Wei as a “Shining star of the New Literature” in the review Xiandai Pinglun. Bai Wei thus became a prominent figure of modern Chinese Literature.

In 1926, Bai Wei gave up a scholarship that would have enabled her to continue her studies and returned to China to join the Northern Expedition led by the Kuomintang. In 1927, she served the Wuhan National Revolutionary Army as a Japanese translator. She became a lecturer at Zhong Shan University. After the failure of the revolution in 1927, Bai Wei went back to Shanghai and married the poet yang sao (杨; 骚).

Bai Wei started making a living from her publications. Upon a request to write a play by the Wuhan Regime, Bai Wei wrote one of her most famous plays : Breaking out of the ghost tower (Dachu Youlingta) published in 1928. The play is about a social tragedy that represents women's condition and resistance to the oppression of the patriarchal system. It was viewed by critiques as an adaption of Henrik Ibsen's A Doll’s House. Compared to her previous publications, the play is testament to an effort to represent society in a realistic way even though the romantic style is still prevalent.

At the same time, she became a member of the Creation Society where she was invited to write. She however felt that she was under qualified and lacked of life experience to publish in any magazine of the Creation Society.

=== First Novel and transition to realism. ===
In 1929, Bai Wei published her first novel titled A bomb and a Bird on an Expedition (Zhadan yu zheng niao). The novel, edited by Luxun and Yu Dafu, and published in Torrents, explores the parallelism between women's oppression and the national crises. The story was influenced by Bai Wei's own experience of the 1927 revolution when she was working as a Japanese translator for the Wuhan Regime. The story deals with two sisters : Yu Yue and Yu Bin. Liu Yue escapes her arranged marriage and joins the Wuhan government for the revolution. Bin, on the other hand, is portrayed as a sexually liberated woman playing with men.

In the early 1930s, Bai Wei became increasingly involved in leftist literacy circles as she joined the League of Leftist Writers and progressively became a socially and politically engaged writer. Along with Lu xun, Yu Dafu, and Tian Han she signed the declaration of the League of the Freedom Movement in china. In 1931, after the Japanese invasion of Manchuria, Bai Wei published patriotic pieces in the magazine Beidou (北斗).

Despite her active political involvement, Bai Wei was going through difficult times financially, mentally and physically. She was very poor and her relationship with Yang Sao was coming to an end. She was also very ill as she contracted Syphilis from her husband.

=== A Tragic Life. ===
Bai Wei documented her personal romance and disillusionment of ten years relationship with Yang Sao in her 900 pages novel A Tragic Life (Beiju shengya). Written between 1934 and 1936, the autobiographical novel is considered to be her major work.

In the novel, through a fictional character yet very self- reflective on her life, Bai Wei narrates her own struggle with the venereal disease she contracted and her self-destructive relationship. She also expresses her inability to emancipate herself from this harmful relation as well as her lack of control over her destiny and her body. This can be interpreted as a form of feminine subordination in the patriarchal society. In fact, the personal and intimate narrative can be viewed as a collective political revendication of all women's oppressed souls. Although Bai Wei refused the idea of women's subordination and the notion of self sacrifice according to Confucian values, she found herself entrapped and helpless in her relationship. Such inadequacies called the women nature into question. Bai Wei identified a form of self-alienation of women and their bodies due to the patriarchal system. The politicization of private domestic life that Bai Wei suggests through her novel goes against the writings of national defense in the context of war, which consequently evinced the female condition theme in literature.

The very fragmented writing style adopted in the novel reflect the distress and pain experienced by Bai Wei. The storyline fluctuates in different temporalities with many flashbacks. The author uses different writing modes such as poetry, diary entries and love letters. The narration oscillates between the first and third person which echoes the question of women's identity and authentic nature raised by the author.

The verisimilitude of the story is found in the objective, unembellished, and hysterical mode in the writing of the novel.

The novel once published received many positive feedback in the form of letters to the publishing house. The readers were so touched that an open letter asking for donations to help Bai Wei pay her hospital costs was thereafter released.

=== End of literary career ===
Following the Japanese occupation in Beijing, Bai Wei moved to Wuhan in 1938 and became active in the National Resistance Association of literary and art workers. She worked as a correspondent for the New China Dailey (Xinhua Ribao) and subsequently moved to Chongqing to work at the Committee for Cultural Work under the political department.

After the establishment of the PRC in 1949, Bai Wei became a member of the Association of Chinese Writers in Beijing but thereafter published little. During the Cultural Revolution, Bai Wei was persecuted and tortured.

She died in 1987 in Beijing Union Hospital at the age of 93.

== Legacy ==
=== Contradictory critiques ===
Bai Wei published work received very contradictory critiques. Some of her plays in the 1920s, including Linli and Dachu Youlingta were highly appreciated which allowed her to be regarded as one of the most influential modern Chinese women playwrights by a number of critics. Her exploration of the patriarchal oppression and her devotion for women's liberation was strongly applauded.

However, she was at the se time subject to many harsh criticisms. David Wang Der-Wei in a review wrote : “with contrived plot, hysterical characterization and convoluted rhetoric, Bai Wei’s style has often been regarded as a failed attempt to grasp the real.“

Her plays were criticized for their lengthy monologues and their abstract stage directions, making the play unadapted to stage. As a matter of fact, due to financial reasons, her initial approach to drama was solely through play-reading. This made her playwriting relying on what she read and imagined.

Her very private approach to writing also limited the accessibility and readability of her literary work. A characteristic of Bai Wei's work is that she was primarily writing for herself. She did not consider much the form and suitability for the public which made her writing style very raw. This is one of the reasons why most of her plays were left unpublished. As her literary career progressed, she decided to be more engaging in her work by dealing with social problems.

=== Commemoration ===
Written by Bai Shurong and He You (Bai Wei's niece), the book Bai Wei Ping Zhuan published in 1983 explores Bai Wei's life and work and includes many conversations with Bai Wei. A repository was collected in honour of Bai Wei's literary legacy and opened to the public in 2003. Bai Wei's hometown local government also contributed to raise the public awareness of Bai Wei. A memorial in Zixing was built after her ashes were brought back.

A statue of Bai Wei was raised over her grave and book-shaped culture engraved with quotations of her writing decorates her sepulcher.

=== Unpublished work ===
Only one third of her manuscripts were published. This was a result of her very private approach to writing making her work impenetrable for general readers. In addition, many manuscripts were destroyed during the Sino-Japanese war while others were lost. Bai Wei's also faced many rejection from editors in whom she would send original manuscript without keeping any copy. This contributed to the loss of some of her literary works.

== Partial Bibliography ==
Date of Publication	Title in Mandarin (pinyin)	Title in English
1922	Sufei	Sophia
1925	Linli	Miss Linli
1929	Qiangweijiu	Rose Wine
1926	Fangwen	Visiting Qingwen
1928	Gemingshen de shounan	The suffering of the revolutionary god
1928	Dachu Youlingta	Breaking out of the ghost tower
1929	Zhadan yu zheng niao	A bomb and a Bird on an Expedition
1932	Beininglu mouzhan	A station at the Beiling road
1932	Di tongzhi	Enemy in comrades
1933	Zhanhuo	The disasters of war
1933	Fengzai	Disaster of a rich harvest
1934	Yijiusuansi	Treating all equally
1936	Beiju shengya	A Tragic Life
1940	Ye shen qu	A tune late at night
