= Krasnaya Nov =

Soviet literary and cultural magazine

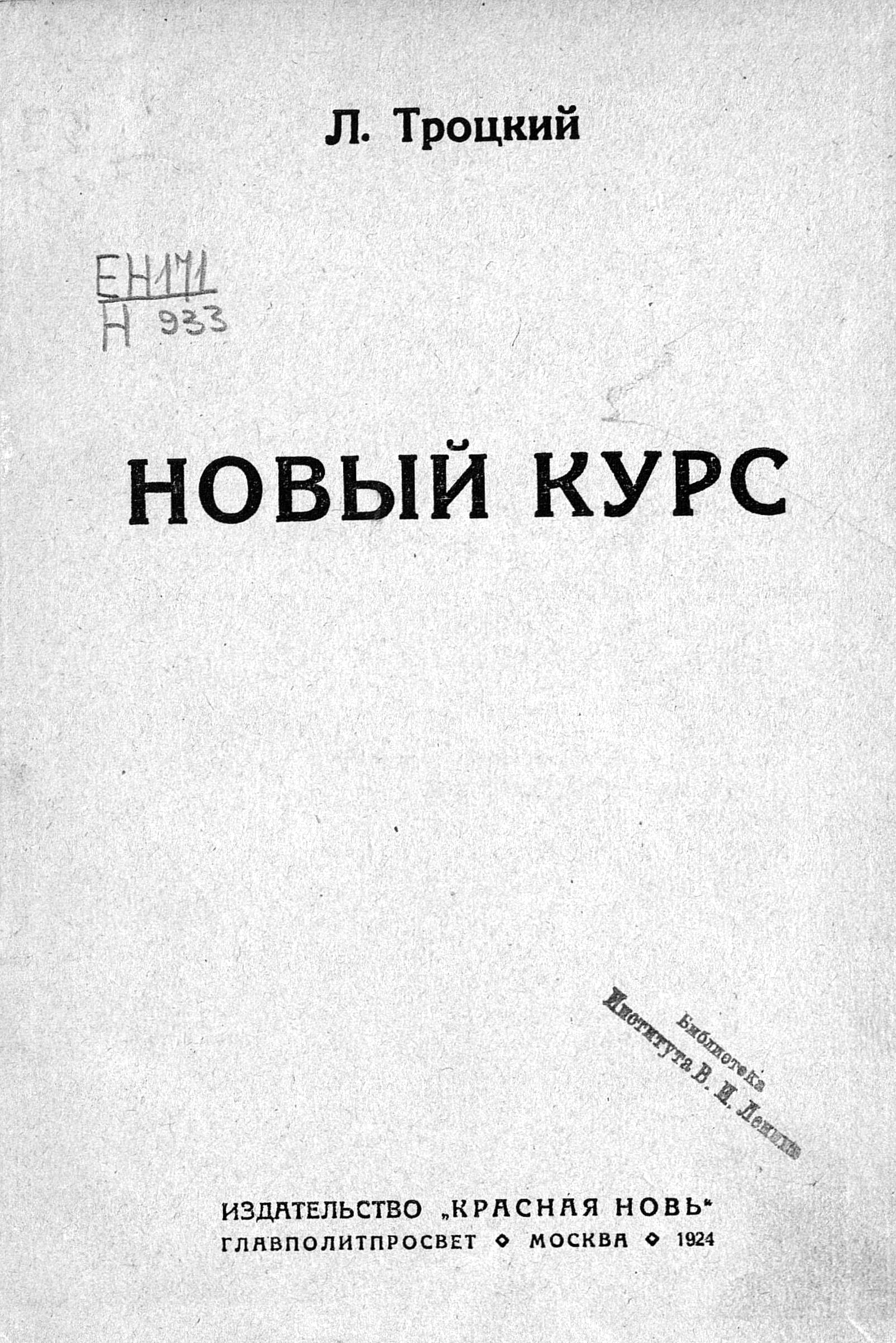
- The original brochure by the "Krasnaya Nov" Publishers
- Editor-in-chief: Alexander Voronsky (1921–1927); Alexander Fadeev (1931–1942)
- Frequency: Monthly
- Circulation: 15 thousand (1921); 45 thousand (1942)
- First issue: June 1921
- Final issue: Summer 1942
- Based in: Moscow
- Language: Russian

Krasnaya Nov (Russian: Красная новь, lit. ''Red Virgin Soil'') was a Soviet monthly literary magazine.

== History ==
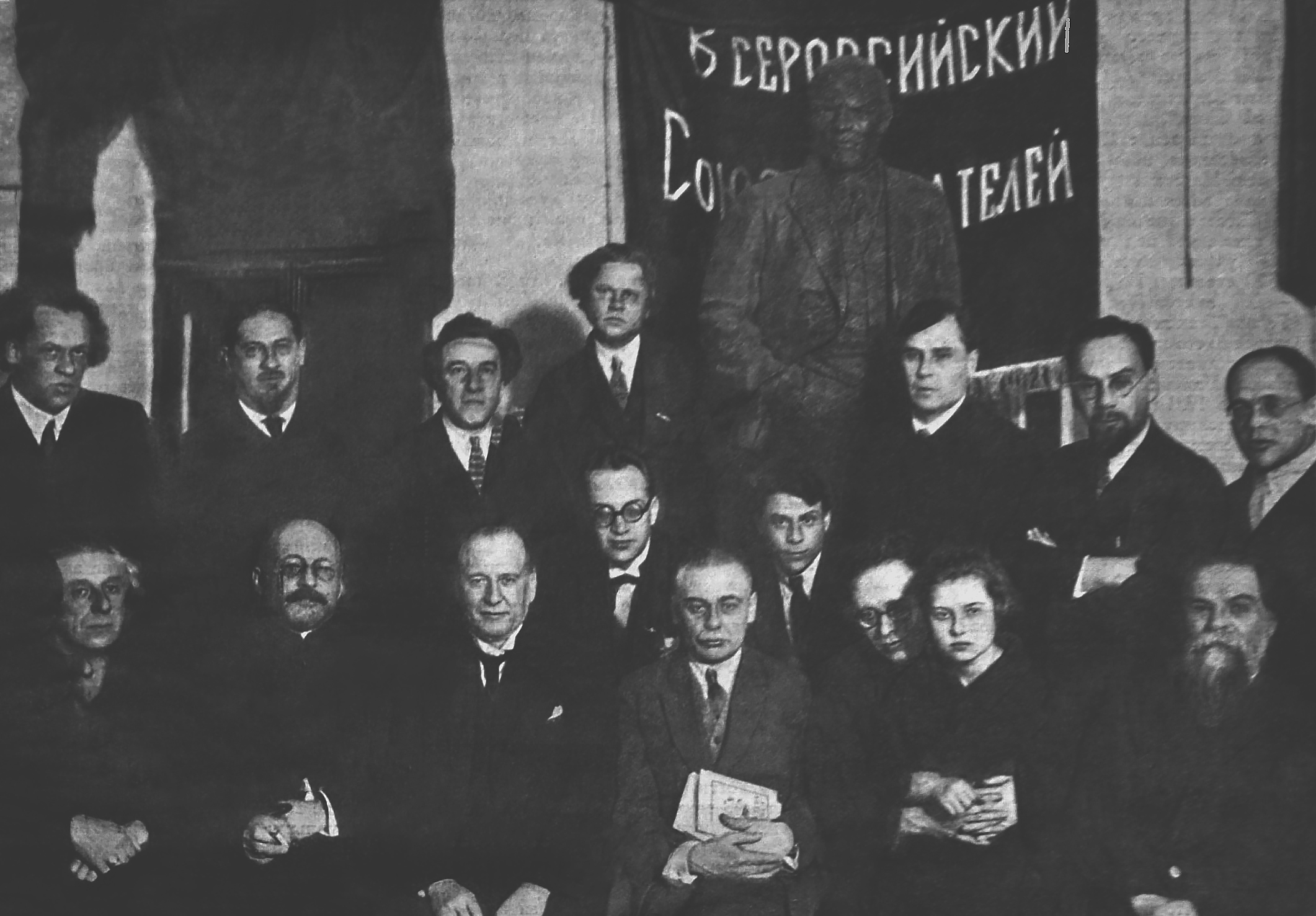
Five year anniversary of Krasnaya Nov June 1926; sitting left to right: Georgy Chulkov, Vikenty Veresaev, Christian Rakovsky, Boris Pilnyak, Aleksandr Voronsky, Petr Oreshin, Karl Radek and Pavel Sakulin; standing left to right: Ivan Evdokimov, Vasily Lvov-Rogachevsky, Vyacheslav Polonsky, Fedor Gladkov, Mikhail Gerasimov, Abram Ėfros and Isaac Babel

Krasnaya Nov, the first Soviet "thick" literary magazine, was established in June 1921. In its first 7 years, under editor-in-chief Alexander Voronsky, it reached a circulation of 15,000 copies, publishing works of the leading Soviet authors, including Maxim Gorky, Vladimir Mayakovsky, and Sergey Yesenin, as well as essays on politics, economics, and science by authors like Lenin, Stepanov-Skvortsov, Bukharin, Frunze and Radek, among others.

In 1927, Voronsky was condemned as a Trotskyist and fired. He was replaced first by an editorial board consisting of Vladimir Vasilyevsky, Vladimir Fritsche and Fyodor Raskolnikov (summer 1927–spring 1929), then chief editor Fyodor Raskolnikov (1929–1930), Ivan Bespalov (1930–1931), and Alexander Fadeyev (1931–1942), the latter bringing the circulation figures up to 45,000. In late 1941 the magazine was evacuated and in 1942 it closed for good.

Krasnaya Nov had its own publishing house of the same name. Among its publications was Trotsky's brochure "New Course".
