= Boris Pilnyak =

Russian author (1894–1938)

- Борис Пильняк
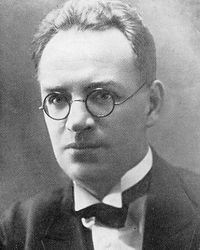
- Born: Boris Andreyevich Vogau; 11 October 1894; Mozhaysk, Russian Empire
- Died: 21 April 1938 (aged 43); Kommunarka shooting ground, Moscow Oblast, Russian SFSR, Soviet Union
- Occupations: Novelist, short story writer
- Notable work: The Naked Year; The Tale of the Unextinguished Moon

Boris Andreyevich Pilnyak (né Vogau; Russian: Борис Андреевич Пильняк; 11 October [O.S. 29 September] 1894 – 21 April 1938) was a Russian and Soviet writer who was executed by the Soviet government on false claims of plotting to kill Joseph Stalin and Nikolay Yezhov.

== Biography ==
He was born Boris Andreyevich Vogau (Russian: Борис Андреевич Вогау) in Mozhaysk. His father was a doctor, descended from German farmers who settled on the banks of the Volga during the reign of Catherine the Great. His mother came from an old merchant family from Saratov. Boris first became interested in writing at the age of nine. Among his early influences were Andrei Bely, Aleksey Remizov, and Yevgeny Zamyatin.

Pilnyak achieved fame very quickly at the age of 25 through his novel The Naked Year (Голый год, 1922; translated into English 1928), one of the first fictional accounts of the Russian civil war. He was a major supporter of anti-urbanism and a critic of mechanized society, views which brought him into disfavor with Communist critics. The poet Demyan Bedny denounced him in Pravda on 16 October 1923 as a 'stinking' member of the 'horde of clueless fellow travellers'. The Old Bolshevik, Aleksandr Voronsky, founding editor of the journal Krasnaya nov (Red Virgin Soil), was offended by the remark, made by a character, that the Russian revolution "smells of sexual organs", but acknowledged Pilnyak's talent, and published his next work Materials for a Novel.

Pilnyak followed this with a strange short story The Tale of the Unextinguished Moon, published in the literary journal Novy Mir ('New World') in May 1926. In the story, a Red Army commander is ordered by 'the three who lead' to undergo a medical operation, which he does reluctantly. He dies on the operating table, the implication being that the 'three who lead' had wanted him dead. In October 1925, Mikhail Frunze, who had replaced Trotsky at the head of the Red Army, died after being advised by the Politburo, then dominated by the triumvirate of Joseph Stalin, Grigory Zinoviev and Lev Kamenev, to undergo an operation. There is no evidence that Stalin wanted Frunze dead, and Pilnyak tried to cover himself against the charge of slandering the leadership by adding a note at the end of his story, dated 28 January 1926, saying that he hardly knew Frunze and that the reader should not look for 'genuine facts and living persons' in the story. Nonetheless, the story created a scandal. Voronsky was shocked and embarrassed that the story was dedicated to him and declared that "I reject this dedication with disgust." The offending edition of Novy Mir was banned and the OGPU visited all known subscribers to confiscate their copies. They were later sent a substitute edition with a different story in place of Pilnyak's. The magazine issued a public apology. He was in China, on a tour of the Far East when the storm broke, and could have defected, but instead hurried back to defend himself. Despite showing no enthusiasm for the Bolshevik revolution, he knew several high ranking communists, and turned for protection to the chief editor of Izvestya, Ivan Skvortsov-Stepanov who introduced him to the Chairman of the Council of People's Commissars (or prime minister) Alexei Rykov. At Rykov's urging, he wrote a letter expressing remorse, which was published in Novy Mir in January 1927.

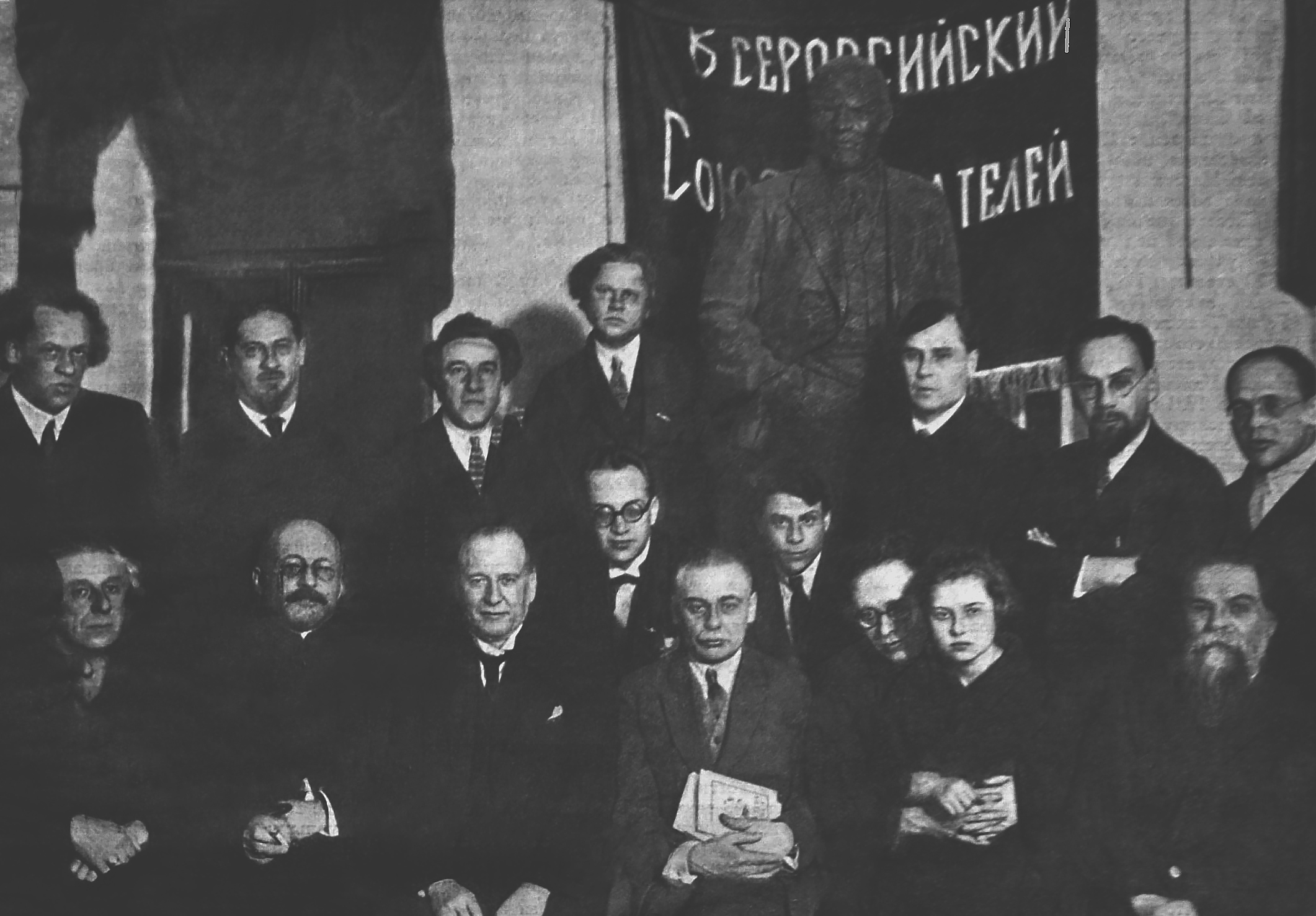
Sitting left to right: Georgy Chulkov, Vikenty Veresaev, Christian Rakovsky, Boris Pilnyak, Aleksandr Voronsky, Petr Oreshin, Karl Radek and Pavel Sakulin. Standing left to right: Ivan Evdokimov, Vasily Lvov-Rogachevsky, Vyacheslav Polonsky, Feodor Gladkov, Mikhail Gerasimov, Abram Ėfros and Isaac Babel.

By now Pilnyak was second only to Maxim Gorky as the most read living Russian writer, in the Soviet Union and abroad. To protect his copyright, Pilnyak had an arrangement under which all his works were published simultaneously in Moscow and Berlin. His best known novel, Mahogany (Кра́сное де́рево, 1927, translated 1965), was banned in Russia, but—like his other work—was published in Berlin. This gave Pilnyak's enemy, Leopold Averbakh, head of the Russian Association of Proletarian Writers the pretext to launch an attack that was carried through four successive weekly editions of the 'Literary Gazette', which Averbakh controlled, and which headlines such as 'A Hostile Network of Agents in the Ranks of Soviet Writers' and 'Boris Pilnyak, Special Correspondent for the White Guard'. The poet Vladimir Mayakovsky joined in, claiming that "at the present time of darkening storm clouds this is the same as treachery at the front" and Maxim Gorky wrote to one of the secretaries of the Communist Party, Andrey Andreyev complaining about how "Pilnyak has been forgiven for his story about the death of Comrade Frunze".

Unlike Yevgeny Zamyatin, who was subjected to a similar attack at the same time and refused to apologise or back down, Pilnyak capitulated and agreed to comply with the regime's requirements. He found a new protector in Nikolai Yezhov, the future murderous head of the NKVD, who acted as his personal censor during the composition of his next novel, The Volga Flows into the Caspian Sea (Волга впадает в Каспийское море, 1930; translated 1931), which described the forced industrialisation drive in glowing language. Victor Serge visited Pilnyak while this work was in progress. "Pilnyak would twist his great mouth. 'He has given me a list of 50 passages to change outright! Ah!' he would exclaim, 'if only I could write freely!' At other times I found him in the throes of depression. 'They'll end up by throwing me in jail, don't you think?' I gave him heart by explaining that his fame in Europe and America safeguarded him." In Artists in Uniform, published in 1934 Max Eastman wrote a chapter entitled "The Humiliation of Boris Pilnyak."

After he had debased himself, he was allowed to resume his place in the elite, and to travel to Paris, New York and Tokyo. Another of his well-known works is Okay! An American Novel, (О’кей! Американский роман, 1931; translated 1932), an unflattering travelogue of his 1931 visit to the United States. He used the visit to Japan to write A story about how stories come to be written. He was also allocated a private dacha on an estate reserved for privileged writers, where his neighbour was Boris Pasternak, one of the few who had defended him in 1929. In 1936, they were visited by the French novelist André Gide, who was seeking an honest opinion about life in the Soviet Union. A police informer told the NKVD that Pilnyak and Pasternak had several secret meetings with André Gide, and supplied him with information about the situation in the USSR. There is no doubt that Gide used this information in his book attacking the USSR. A report by Aleksandr Arosev at VOKS described Pilnyak and Pasternak's influence on Gide as "not very favorable" («не очень благоприятным»).

Despite his public debasement, Pilnyak acted courageously in secret. When he heard that Karl Radek, a prominent member of the left wing opposition, was living in hardship after being exiled to Tomsk, Pilnyak sent him money. He also corresponded with the Spanish communist, Andreu Nin, who broke with Stalin in 1927 and founded the POUM (the party George Orwell supported during the Spanish civil war). When Victor Serge was arrested in Moscow, Pilnyak urged Nin to generate international pressure to secure his release. This correspondence was discovered when the NKVD kidnapped Nin in Barcelona. On 28 October 1937, Pasternak dropped by to congratulate Pilnyak and his Georgian wife, Kira Andronikashvili, on their son's third birthday. That evening, Pilnyak was arrested. He was accused of plotting to kill Stalin and Yezhov, and of being a Japanese spy. He was tried on 21 April 1938, pleaded guilty, and was shot the same day. A small yellow slip of paper attached to his file read: "Sentence carried out." He was executed with a bullet to the back of the head at the Kommunarka shooting ground.

Pilnyak began to be rehabilitated and appreciated again in the USSR in the late 1960s and 1970s.

== Bibliography ==
- With the Last Steamboat (1918) [С последним пароходом]
- The Naked Year (1922) [Голый Год]
- Petersburg Story (1922) [Повесть Петербургская]
- Panicle (1923) [Метелинка]
- Sankt-Peter-Burgh (1922) [Санкт-Питер-бурх]
- Deadly Beckoning (1922) [Смертельное манит]
- Nikola-on-Posadiyah (1923) [Никола-на-Посадьях]
- Simple Tales (1923) [Простые рассказы]
- Tales of Brown Bread (1923) [Повести о чёрном хлебе]
- The Third Chair (1923) [Третья столица]
- English stories (1924) [Английские рассказы]
- Tales (1924) [Повести]
- Stories (1924) [Рассказы]
- Machines and Wolves (1925) [Машины и волки]
- The Tale of the Unextinguished Moon (1926) [Повесть непогашенной луны]
- Blizzard (1926) [Метель]
- The Heirs and other stories (1926) [Настроени и др. рассказы]
- Stories of Shreds and Clay (1926) [Рассказы о клочах и глине]
- Russia in Flight (1926) [Россия в полете]
- Ivan Moscow (1927) [Иван Москва]
- Regular stories (1927) [Очередные повести]
- Kataysky Diary (1927) [Катайскйи дневник]
- Combed Time (1927) [Расплёснутое время]
- The Roots of the Japanese Sun (1927) [Корни японского солнца]
- A Big Heart (1927) [Большое сердце]
- Stories (1927) [Рассказы]
- Stories from the East (1927) [Рассказы с востока]
- Katay story (1928) [Катайская повесть]
- Mahagony (1929) [Красное дерево]
- Stories (1929) [Рассказы]
- The Volga Flows into the Caspian Sea (1930) [Волга владает в Каспийское море]
- Stories (1932) [Рассказы]
- Okey! An American novel (1933) [О'кэй]
- Stories (1933) [Рассказы]
- Stones and Roots (1934) [Камни и корни]
- Chosen stories (1935) [Изабранные рассказы]
- Birth of Man (1935) [Рождение человека]
- Fruit ripening (1936) [Созревание плодов]
- Meat (1936) [Мясо]

== Influence ==
Pilnyak is generally considered the greatest Russian novelist of 1920s and was the second most read writer of that time, only behind Maxim Gorky. His modernist style of writing influenced a whole generation, not only Russian but also many Yugoslav writers, the most famous of them being Danilo Kiš, Dubravka Ugrešić and Miodrag Bulatovic among others. Kiš often cited Pilnyak as one of his main influences and one of his favourite Russian authors along with Yury Olesha and Isaac Babel.

In 1928, the then relatively unknown author Andrei Platonov published a short story called "Che-Che-O" (Central Chernozem Oblast) in 'co-authorship' with Pilnyak. It is believed that Pilnyak's role in this story was limited to finalising the text and lending it his rather more famous name, in order to help the younger Platonov.
