= Charles Ashleigh =

English labour activist, writer, and translator

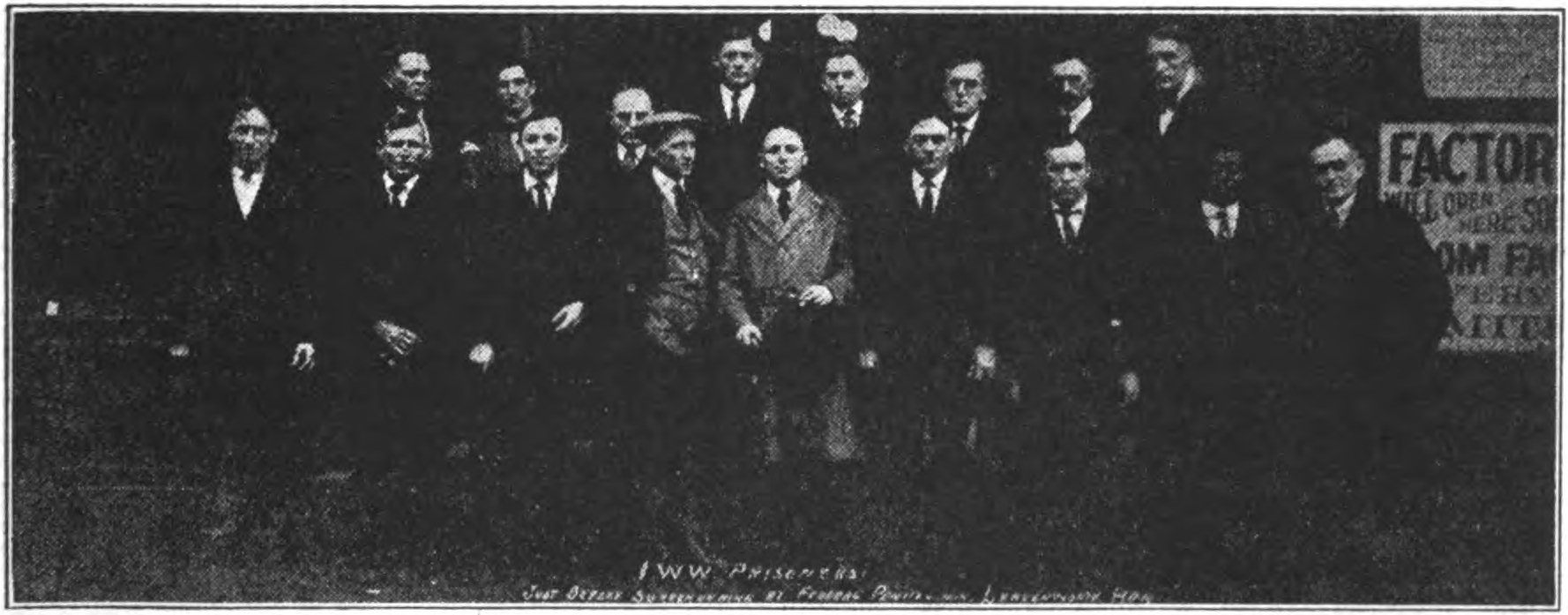
Ashleigh (front row, center) amongst a group of I.W.W. prisoners, June 1921

Charles Ashleigh (25 November 1888 – 25 December 1974) was an English labour activist, writer, and translator who became prominent in the Industrial Workers of the World (IWW) and later the Communist Party of Great Britain.

== Life ==
Ashleigh was born in West Hampstead, London in 1888. His mother was Lillie Ashleigh living at 66 West End Lane, on the corner with Cleve Lane. Later, in about 1918, he stated he was not married and that his father was deceased but no name was given.

Around 1905 or 1906, Ashleigh had been in London as in a letter he mentioned meeting a Mrs Horsley, outside Cornwall Hall, wishing to attend a lecture which had been cancelled. In 1909 he lectured on socialism across Wales.

In 1916, seven members of the IWW were killed by sheriff's deputies during the Everett Massacre. 74 IWW members were then arrested. Ashleigh worked for the Everett Prisoners’ Defense League during their trial.

While working as a journalist in San Francisco, Ashleigh was arrested on 20 October 1917, during a national sweep of radical leaders and organizers. Ashleigh was put on trial for seditious conspiracy, conspiracy to injure civil rights, and conspiracy to obstruct the military service with other IWW leaders in Chicago in 1918. He was sentenced to 10 years in the United States Penitentiary, Leavenworth, Kansas, on 7 September 1918, Ashleigh was inmate 13115. A fellow inmate was William D. Haywood, together with around 90 others from the IWW. His sentence was commuted on 26 December 1921, after Ashleigh agreed to be deported to England.

After his release from prison Ashleigh moved to New York City at the insistence of The Liberator, which had published his prison poems and implored their readers to fund his bail. While in New York, Ashleigh befriended the Jamaican poet, Claude McKay. The pair were romantically involved off and on throughout the 1910s and 1920s. In 1922, the pair traveled together to the 4th World Congress of the Communist International in Petrograd, USSR. The following year the pair traveled to Berlin and reconnected in Nice in 1926.

Ashleigh died from cancer on 25 December 1974 in Brighton.

Two small collections of interviews with Ashleigh are held at Wayne State University's Walter P. Reuther Library and the Special Collections Library at Nuffield College, Oxford.

== Works ==
=== Fiction ===
Charles Ashleigh, The Rambling Kid (London: Faber & Faber, 1930). Reprinted by Charles H. Kerr in 2004.

=== Poetry ===
- Charles Ashleigh, "Poems," The Little Review, Vol. 1, No. 5 (July 1914), 1–5.
- Charles Ashleigh, "A Miracle," The Little Review, Vol. 1, No. 9 (December 1914), 54.
- Charles Ashleigh, "Once More - The Road," The Little Review, Vol. 3, No. 10 (April 1917), 15.
- Charles Ashleigh, "Everett, November Fifth," Labor Defender, Vol. 1, No. 11 (November 1926), 193.

=== Non-fiction ===
- "The Poetry of Revolt (Review of Arturo Giovannitti's Arrows in the Gale)," The Little Review, Vol. 1, No. 6 (September 1914), 22-25
- "New War For Old (Review of John Galsworthy's The Mob)," and "Two Finds (Review of George Cronyn's Poems and James Oppenheim's Songs for the New Age)," The Little Review, Vol. 1, No. 7 (October 1914), 11–12, 40–41.
- "Everett Prosecution Forces Are Lining Up: Ted Kenedy's Bravery," Brotherhood of Locomotive Firemen and Enginemen's Magazine, Vol. 62, No. 2 (15 January 1917), 8–9.
- "Everett's Bloody Sunday," The Masses, Vol. 9, No. 4 (February 1917), 18–19.
- "The Lumber Trust and Its Victims," International Socialist Review, Vol. 17, No. 9 (March 1917), 536–538.
- "To Soviet Russia - An American Working Man Speaks," Industrial Pioneer, Vol. 1, No. 2 (March 1921), 46–47.
- "Radio in Russia", The Radio Times, 4 January 1924, p.
- Russia's Second Front in 1914-1916 (London: Russia Today Society, 1943).

=== Translations ===
- Fedor Gladkov, Cement. Translated by A. S. Arthur and Charles Ashleigh (New York: F. Ungar, 1929).
- Max Heinz, Loretto, Sketches of a German Volunteer. Translated by Charles Ashleigh (New York, Horace Liveright, 1930).
- Theodore Plivier, Revolt on the Pampas. Translated by Charles Ashleigh (London: M. Joseph, Ltd., 1937).
- Hans Behrend, The Real Rulers of Germany. Translated by Charles Ashleigh (London: Lawrence & Wishart, 1938).
- Bertolt Brecht, "The Informer." Translated by Charles Ashleigh. New Writing (Spring 1939), 113–120.
