= Mikhail Gerasimov =

Mikhail Gerasimov may refer to:

- Mikhail Gerasimov (archaeologist) (1907–1970), Soviet archaeologist and anthropologist
- Mikhail Gerasimov (poet) (1889–1939), Russian poet
