= Kuznitsa =

Soviet literary association, 1920 to 1932

Kuznitsa (English: Forge or Smithy) was a Soviet literary association which existed from 1920 to 1932.

== Biography ==
The Kuznitsa association consisted of proletarian writers who emerged from Proletkult in January 1920. Among them were Sergei Obradovic, Mikhail Gerasimov, Vasily Aleksandrovsky and Grigory Sannikov. Later they were joined by Sergey Rodov, Vladimir Kirillov, Nikoaly Poletaev, V. Kazin, Ivan Filipchenko, Grigory Nikiforov and Fedor Vasyunin (Kamanin). In May 1920 they founded the magazine "Kuznitsa" (published until 1922) and in December 1920 they chose this name for their group.

From the very beginning, the group opposed itself to pre-revolutionary literary movements and schools - symbolism, futurism, imagism. The participants of the "Forge" in their Manifestos declared the primacy of class, proletarian literature, a departure in poetry from "bourgeois" content, compressed by the formal framework of verse, to the exact expression of the proletarian spirit. The proletarian artist was declared the medium of his class. The rhetoric of the "Forge" speeches was very ideological. At the same time, they did not recognize the leadership of cultural development on the part of the party. The writers of "Forge" rejected the NEP, declaring this policy a betrayal of the principles of the World Revolution.

The group claimed a leading role in the development of a new proletarian culture; on its initiative, the First All-Russian Congress of Proletarian Writers was convened (October 18–21, 1920). The congress established The All-Russian Association of Proletarian Writers and elected its board, more than half consisting of members of Kuznitsa.

However, from 1923, a period of splits and decline began for the group. In December 1922, Rodov, Dorogoichenko and Malashkin left Kuznitsa to organize a new association of proletarian writers, Oktyabr, which soon ousted "Kuznitsa" from its leading position. In November 1923, Gerasimov and Kirillov left the group (they also left the party). By this time, G. Yakubovsky became the chairman of the board of Kuznitsa, the management included writers such as Feodor Gladkov and Aleksey Novikov-Priboy.

In 1924, Kuznitsa created a of bloc with the literary group "Pereval", which was led by Aleksandr Voronsky, holding a joint conference against Moscow Association of Proletarian Writers. However, already at the beginning of 1925, they sharply changed their position, speaking on the side of MAPP at the All-Union Conference of Proletarian Writers. In 1928, an attempt was made to create a mass organization capable of competing with RAPP; all regional groups were reorganized into the All-Union Society of Proletarian Writers "Kuznitsa". In 1929, there was an irreconcilable conflict with Russian Association Proletarian Writers, from which the latter emerged victorious. In December 1929, the Central Council of "Kuznitsa" announced its readiness to capitulate under certain conditions. When discussing these conditions at the end of 1930, "Kuznitsa" split into two parts: the Moscow central group "Kuznitsa" led by Vladimir Bakhmetyev and "New Kuznitsa" led by Ivan Zhiga. Both factions eventually merged with RAPP as creative groups.
