= Fyodor Ilyin =

Fyodor Ilyin can refer to:

- Fyodor Raskolnikov Russian politician, revolutionary and writer
- Fyodor Ilyin (Ильин, Фёдор Николаевич) (1873–1959), Russian writer
