= Aleksandr Voronsky =

Russian literary critic and theorist (1884–1937)

- Алекса́ндр Воро́нский
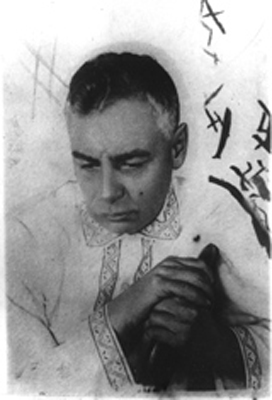
- Portrait of Voronsky whilst in exile in Lipetsk, 1929
- Born: 8 September 1884; Khoroshavka, Tambov Governorate, Russian Empire
- Died: 13 August 1937 (aged 52); Moscow, Russian SFSR, Soviet Union
- Cause of death: Executed
- Resting place: Donskoye Cemetery
- Other name: Nurmin
- Organization: VTsIK
- Notable work: Waters of Life and Death
- Political party: RSDLP(b)
- Other political affiliations: Left Opposition
- Movement: Orthodox Marxism
- Spouse: Serafima Solomonovna Pesina
- Father: Konstantin Osipovich Voronsky
- Military action
- Allegiance: Second and Third Internationals
- WWI org.: All-Russian Zemstvo Union
- Battles: Western Front; First Russian Revolution; Sveaborg rebellion; February Revolution; October Revolution; Suppression of Kronstadt

Aleksandr Konstantinovich Voronsky (Russian: Алекса́ндр Константи́нович Воро́нский; 8 September 1884 [O.S. 27 August] – 13 August 1937) was a prominent humanist Marxist literary critic, theorist and editor of the 1920s, disfavored and purged in 1937 for his work with the Left Opposition and Leon Trotsky during and after the October Revolution. Voronsky's writings were hidden away in the Soviet Union, until his autobiography, Waters of Life and Death, and anthology, Art as the Cognition of Life were translated and published in English.

== Early life ==
Voronsky was born in the village of Khoroshavka in Tambov Governorate; his father was the village priest, Konstantin Osipovich Voronsky, who died when Aleksandr was a few years old. It is likely Voronsky was not the family name, but was taken up his father because his parish was located on the river Vorona. After attending a Tambov religious school, in 1900 he enrolled in the Tambov Seminary, where he helped organize an illegal library for the seminary students. In 1904 he joined the Bolshevik faction of the Russian Social Democratic Labor Party, and the following year he was expelled from the seminary for "political unreliability".

During the 1905 revolution, he moved to St. Petersburg, and applied to join the Bolsheviks. The local organisers, Sergei Malyshev and Maria Ulyanova, younger sister of the Bolshevik leader, Vladimir Lenin, initially turned him away because they thought he was too excitable and liable to buckle under arrest. but he persisted, and was put to work first as a courier, and then running a printing press. In September 1906 he was arrested and sentenced to a year of solitary confinement. Soon after his release he was arrested again in Vladimir and sentenced to two years of exile.

On his way to Yarensk in Vologda guberniya Voronsky met his future wife, Serafima Solomonovna Pesina, another young Bolshevik. After finishing his exile in 1910 he moved to Moscow and then Saratov, where he helped form a provincial group of Bolsheviks and organize a number of major strikes. In January 1912 he was one of 18 delegates to the Prague Party Conference, at which he took the minutes of the conference and spoke strongly for a mass daily workers' newspaper. On his return to Russia he continued underground work and was rearrested on May 8; his exile ended in September 1914, when he returned to Tambov with his wife and newborn daughter, Galina, moving to Ekaterinoslav the following year.

== Participation in the Bolshevik Revolution ==
When the February Revolution came, he became a member of the Odessa Executive Committee of the Council of Workers' Deputies and edited the local Bolshevik newspaper, Golos proletariya (transl. Voice of the Proletariat). After the October Revolution, he helped the Bolsheviks take power in Odessa and in early 1918 moved to Saratov, Moscow, and then Ivanovo, where he assisted his friend Mikhail Frunze, edited the newspaper Rabochii krai (Workers' Land), and headed the provincial Party Committee.

== Literary and political career ==
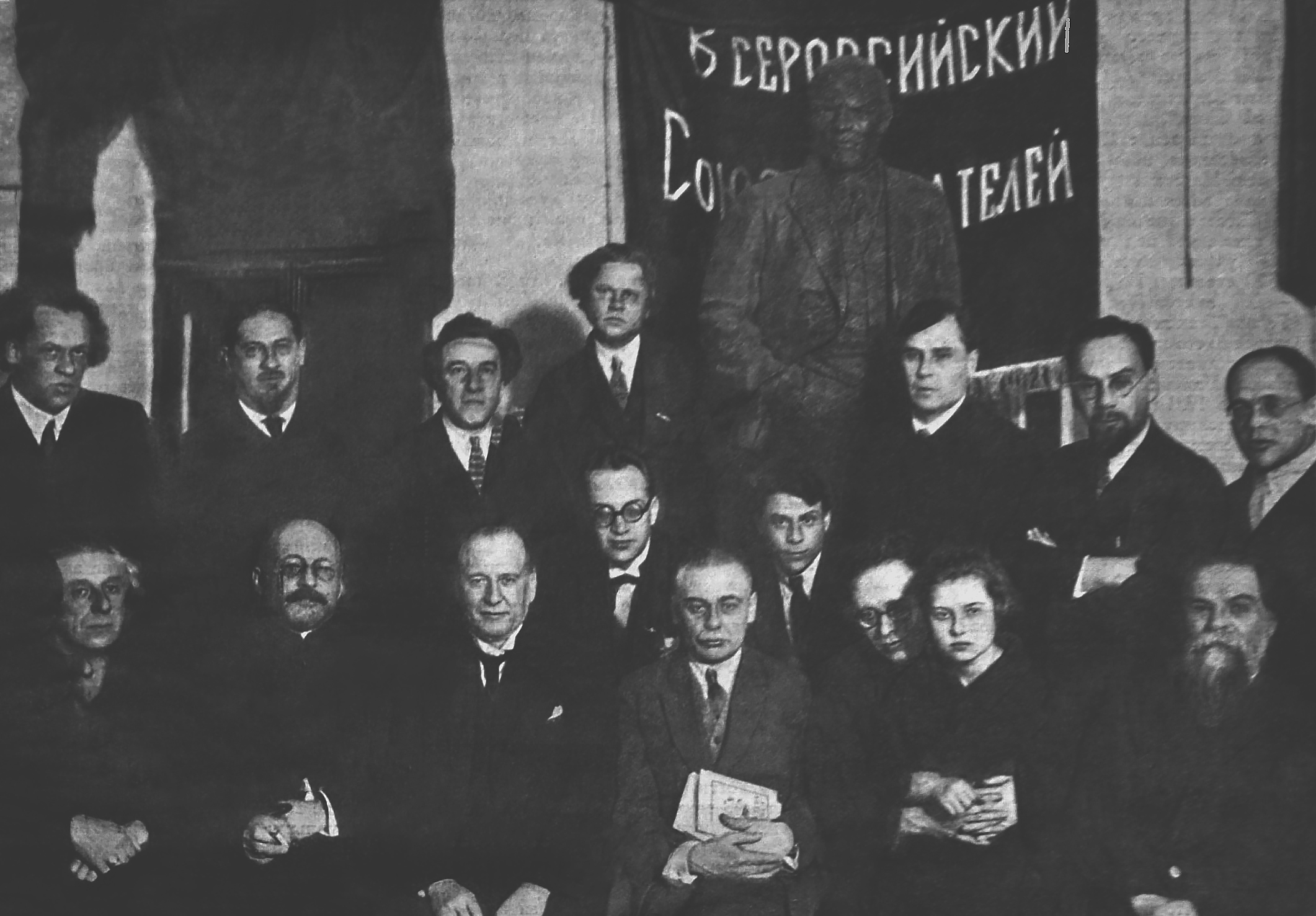
Five year anniversary of Krasnay Nov Jun 1926 sitting left to right: Georgy Chulkov, Vikenty Veresaev, Christian Rakovsky, Boris Pilnyak, Aleksandr Voronsky, Petr Oreshin, Karl Radek and Pavel Sakulin standing left to right: Ivan Evdokimov, Vasily Lvov-Rogachevsky, Vyacheslav Polonsky, Fedor Gladkov, Mikhail Gerasimov, Abram Ėfros and Isaac Babel

In January 1921 Voronsky left for Moscow, where he met with Lenin and Gorky to discuss plans for a new "thick journal", which was called Krasnaya Nov (Red Virgin Soil) when the first issue was published in June, with Gorky listed as editor of its literary section. In 1923 he organized a new publishing house, Krug (Circle). Krasnaya Nov was a revival of a 19th century Russian tradition of the 'thick' journal - a periodical containing hundreds of pages, with sections on history, science, literature etc. The first issue of Krasnaya Nov contained 300 pages. Contributors to early issues included high ranking Bolsheviks - Lenin, Nadezhda Krupskaya, Nikolai Bukharin, Karl Radek, Yevgeni Preobrazhensky the late Rosa Luxemburg and others - who wrote "not the polite testimonials one might expect of busy politicians, but substantial and thoughtful articles."

What proved to be the most controversial section of the magazine at the time was the literary section. Voronsky accepted contributions from "ideologically confused" writers, who were classed as "fellow travellers", meaning that they were not communists, nor politically active, but were not hostile to the regime, such as Boris Pasternak, Alexei Tolstoy, Sergei Yesenin, Boris Pilnyak, Konstantin Fedin, Vsevolod Ivanov, and Leonid Leonov and was one of the few Party critics to recognize the gifts of Isaac Babel. According to the eminent Russian critic, Gleb Struve, Krasnaya Nov was "the principal refuge of fellow travellers". Voronsky also hosted literary evenings in his double room in the Hotel National, Moscow, where writers and leading Bolsheviks met, everyone brought a bottle of red wine and poetry or prose was read by their authors.

In the fractured cultural scene of the early 1920s, Voronsky and Krasnaya Nov became the main target of groups like the Russian Association of Proletarian Writers (RAPP), who argued that literature was a weapon in the class struggle, and thick journals like Krasnaya Nov were "fortresses and beachheads of the armies of literature" and therefore by publishing works by 'bourgeois' writers, according to the critic Ilya Vardin, Voronsky had "become a weapon in the cause of reinforcing the position of the bourgeoisie," and was "utterly hopeless in the resolution of the active political tasks of the proletariat in the field of literature."

At the start of this campaign, Voronsky was in a strong position because he had high level party support. When the Press Section of the Central Committee convened the first officially sponsored debate on literary politics, held over two days in May 1924, Voronsky was the main speaker in defence of 'fellow travellers', backed by Trotsky, Radek, Bukharin, Anatoly Lunacharsky and other major Bolsheviks, while his leading opponents, Vardin, and Leopold Averbakh were relatively minor figures. The outcome was a cautiously worded statement which established the principle of party intervention in literary disputes.

Voronsky's strongest ally at the top end of the communist party was Leon Trotsky, who did not believe that in this early stage of the revolution there was any such thing as 'proletarian art', but only "the simple formula of a pseudo-proletarian art", which, he wrote, was "not Marxism, but reactionary populism." Trotysky's book, Literature and Revolution was originally published in Krasnaya Nov in 1924. Also in 1924, Voronsky hosted a literary evening in his flat, to hear a recitation of a poem by Eduard Bagritsky, where guests included Trotsky, Radek, and Isaac Babel, at which Radek spoke disparagingly about the party leadership. This soiree formed of the case against Babel when he was arrested and shot 16 years later.

In October 1923, Voronsky signed The Declaration of 46, drawn up by Bolsheviks who were backing Trotsky in the power struggle that developed while Lenin was terminally ill.

In an autobiography, published in 1927, he described hearing Trotsky speak at a public meeting in 1917 - "His words were cooling, sober, and among the jubilation and joyful excitement they sounded for the first time for me on that day, the exorbitance and heaviness of the paths of the revolution, the inflexibility and ruthlessness of its iron heel, its calculation and its will to subdue chaos and the elements."

== Voronsky's aesthetics ==
Although Voronsky considered himself an orthodox Marxist, he was far from the ideological rigidity that was enforced after Stalin took control. Victor Ehrlich called him "flexible and humane" and wrote:

He combined political orthodoxy with a strong personal commitment to literature, a commitment underpinned by an aesthetic which, though not incompatible with Marxism, could be easily construed within the Soviet Marxist framework as a "bourgeois-idealistic" heresy. To Voronsky, art was not primarily a matter of mobilizing or manipulating group emotions on behalf of a class-determined world view. It was a distinctive form of cognition, a largely intuitive mode of apprehending reality ... a true artist, armed by intuition and creative integrity, cannot help seeing and embodying in his work certain truths that run counter to his conscious bias and to the interests of his class ... No wonder Red Virgin Soil ... became one of the most vital and readable Russian periodicals in the 1920s.

Voronsky expounded the idea of aesthetic evaluation, an exercise in dialectical materialism that combined the search for objective truth with the complexity of human emotion and feeling. Voronsky's criticism of art lay in opposition to the artificial representation of life presented in Stalin's school of socialist realism. Voronsky, in agreement with Trotsky, viewed art as an exercise between the subjective and the objective world of the artist to facilitate a deeper understanding of humanity. Aesthetic evaluation, he wrote, requires a strong correlation to the nature of the object portrayed.

When does the artistic image appear convincing? When we experience a special psychic state of joy, satisfaction, elevated repose, love or sympathy for the author. This psychic state is the aesthetic evaluation of a work of art. Aesthetic feeling lacks a narrowly utilitarian character; it is disinterested, and in this regard it is organically bound up with our general conceptions of the beautiful (although, of course, it is narrower than these concepts). The aesthetic evaluation of a work is the criterion of its truthfulness or falseness. Artistic truth is determined and established precisely through such an evaluation.

— A. Voronsky, Art as the Cognition of Life

== Defeat and death ==
Voronsky's friendship with Trotsky, which was an asset at the start of the controversy over 'proletarian literature' became the cause of his political destruction, and death.

In June 1924, the party leadership, now controlled by Trotsky's enemies, Joseph Stalin and Grigory Zinoviev appointed two new members of the editorial board of Krasnaya Nov. One was a party official, the other was Fyodor Raskolnikov, a former sailor who aspired to be a proletarian writer. By January 1925, Voronsky was no longer listed as an editor, but soon afterwards he was reinstated and Raskolnikov had been removed - possibly because Maxim Gorky had angrily refused to contribute to the journal under the new editorship. But over the next three years "RAPP cleverly targeted Voronsky's most vulnerable point, his friendship with Trotsky"

In May 1927, Voronsky used Krasnaya Nov to attack Averbakh over the way he was controlling the newly formed Federation of Organisations of Soviet Writers. In a reply, published in Pravda, the head of the Press Section of the Central Committee, Sergei Gusev accused Voronsky of being a Trotskyist, and/or a Socialist Revolutionary. In response, Voronsky denied the political charges, offerted to co-operate with RAPP if Averbakh was removed form its leadership, and declared that any fate was better than being suffocated by Averbakh's "literary fumes."

In October 1927, Voronsky was relieved of his duties as editor of the journal. In February 1928 he was expelled from the Party, and in January 1929 he was arrested and exiled to Lipetsk. From there he wrote to the Central Committee declaring:

I leave the Opposition. I support the party’s main line. I find my previous factional activity substantially wrong and I renounce to it. I also consider wrong the Opposition’s accusation that the party leadership is only able to solve difficulties through right wing policies. I condemn Trotsky’s activities, including his activities abroad. I remove my signature from all factional documents. All the resolutions of the party leadership are obligatory to me.

In 1930, he was permitted to return to Moscow, where he continued to write and edit for Gosizdat but was no longer prominent as a critic. American Max Eastman describes Voronsky's increasingly untenable position in a chapter called "Voronsky's Fight For Truth" in his 1934 book Artists in Uniform.

Voronsky was expelled from the party for a second time in 1935, and was arrested early in the Great Purge on 1 February 1937. His name was on a death list signed by Stalin, Molotov, Kaganovich, and Voroshilov on 10 August 1937. At his trial, on 13 August 1937, which lasted only a few minutes he stood up and told the judges that history's judgement would be that they had betrayed the revolution, not he. He was sentenced to death, and shot the same day.

== Rehabilitation ==
Twenty years after his execution, in 1957, Voronsky received official state rehabilitation in the U.S.S.R. However, his work remained heavily censored and devoid of the criticism of socialist realism as well as of the growing Stalinist bureaucracy from his time with the Left Opposition.

Voronsky's essays were translated by researcher Frederick Choate and published in the book Art as the Cognition of Life in 1998 after four years of extensive research inside Moscow libraries between 1991 and 1995. These writings were finally accessible as a result of the fall of the Soviet Union and the change in political climate.

He wrote Za zhivoi i mertvoi vodoi (Russian text) (1927, 1929; tr. as Waters of Life and Death, 1936), "two fine volumes of memoirs."
