= Leopold Averbakh =

Soviet-era Russian literary critic (1903–1937)

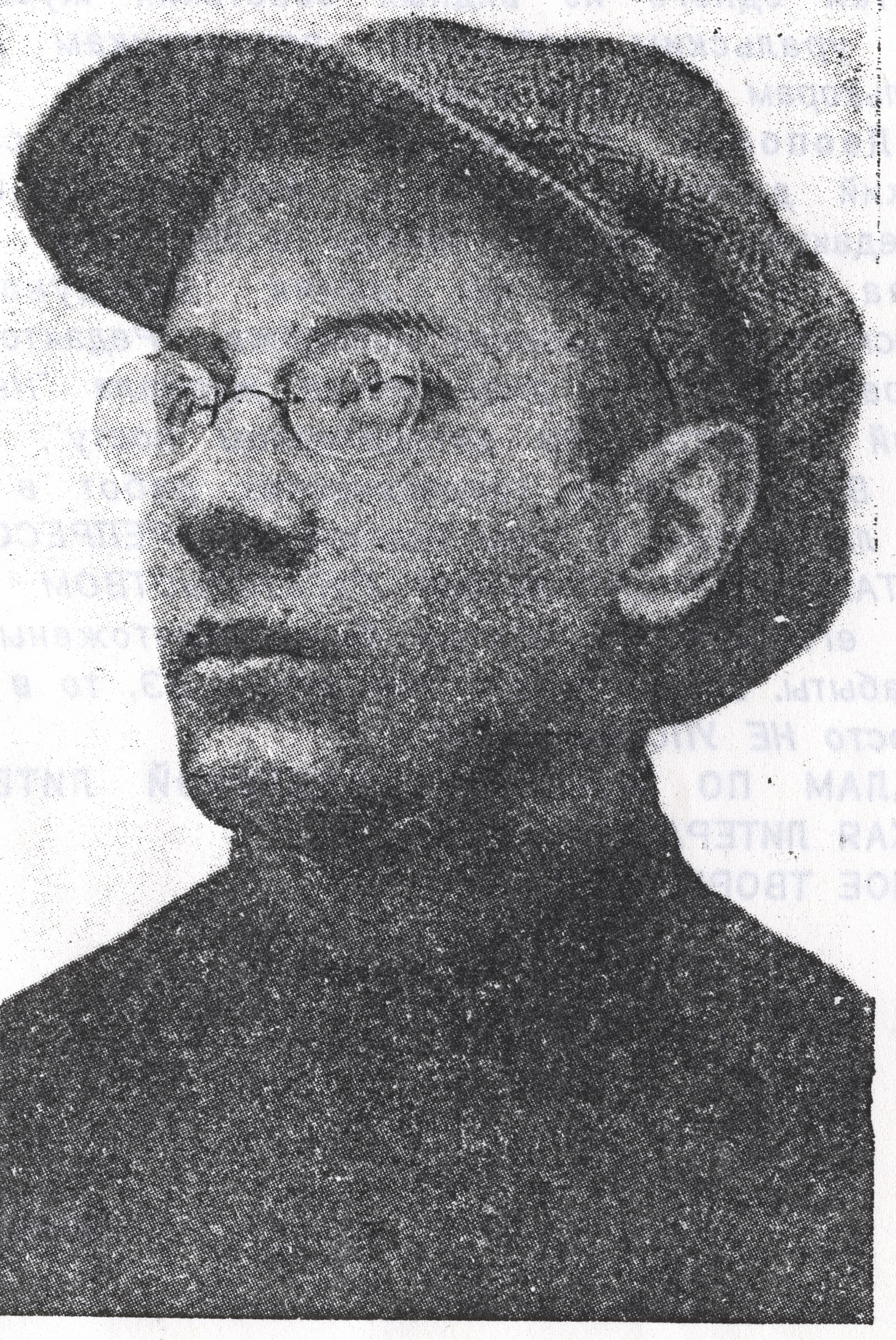
- L. L. Averbakh on the Ogoniok magazine

General Secretary of the Russian Association of Proletarian Writers
- In office January 1925 – April 1932
- Preceded by: position established
- Succeeded by: position abolished

Personal details
- Born: March 8, 1903 Saratov, Russian Empire
- Died: August 14, 1937 (aged 34) Moscow, Soviet Union
- Party: All-Union Communist Party (Bolsheviks)
- Relatives: Yakov Sverdlov (uncle); Zinovy Peshkov (uncle); Vladimir Bonch-Bruyevich (father-in-law); Genrikh Yagoda (brother-in-law)

Leopold Leonidovich Averbakh (Russian: Леопо́льд Леони́дович Аверба́х; 8 March 1903 – 14 August 1937) was a Soviet literary critic, who was the head of the Russian Association of Proletarian Writers (RAPP) in the 1920s and the most prominent member of a group of communist literary critics who argued that the Bolshevik Revolution, carried out in 1917 in the name of Russia's industrial working class, should be followed by a cultural revolution, in which bourgeois literature would be supplanted by literature written by and for the proletariat. Averbakh was a powerful figure in Russian cultural circles until Joseph Stalin ordered RAPP to cease its activities in 1932.

== Family and early career ==
Leopold Averbakh was born to Jewish parents in 1903 in Saratov, though most of his family links were in Nizhny Novgorod. His father Leonid owned a small steamship on the Volga. Aged only 14 at the time of the Bolshevik revolution, Leopold had exceptionally good family links with the new regime. His mother was the sister of Yakov Sverdlov and of Zinovy Sverdlov, who became the adopted son of Maxim Gorky. He was also the son-in-law of Vladimir Bonch-Bruyevich. His sister Ida married Genrikh Yagoda, future head of the NKVD. He played a prominent role in the Bolshevik youth movement in his teens, and by the age of 19 he was editor of the literary journal Molodaya gvardiya ('Young Guard'), and a leading member of the All-Russian Association of Proletarian Writers (VAPP), the forerunner of RAPP. He was one of three representatives of VAPP, who signed an agreement in 1923 with the poet Vladimir Mayakovsky, promising that their respective organisations would co-operate to "steadfastly unmask bourgeois-gentry and pseudo-sympathetic literary groups" and to promote "class artistry". One of the 'bourgeois' writers they targeted was Mikhail Bulgakov, whom Averbakh denounced in September 1924 as a writer "who doesn't pretend to disguise himself as a fellow traveller."

== Head of RAPP ==
Late in 1925, the Soviet communist party's ruling triumvirate of Stalin, Grigory Zinoviev and Lev Kamenev split. Illarion Vardin, effective leader of VAPP, joined the Zinoviev faction. Averbakh and most of VAPP's younger members broke with him and founded RAPP, as a kind of literary wing of the Stalinist faction, though they never sought or received Stalin's formal endorsement. Averbakh was RAPP's unchallenged leader for the whole of its existence. He wrote extensively – "a prolific critic who hoped to apply Karl Marx's understanding of historical materialism to literary production, Averbakh's theoretical contribution to Soviet literary scholarship cannot be negated."

== Personality and reputation ==
Averbakh was the first from the generation who were too young to have taken part in revolutionary activity before 1917 to achieve prominence under communist rule. Some of his contemporaries, such as Mikhail Suslov, still held high office in the 1980s, whereas Averbakh's career had peaked 50 years earlier. He was an effective organiser, but had a bad reputation. The French writer, Victor Serge, who knew Averbakh for many years, described him as:

a young Soviet careerist possessed of an extraordinary talent for the bureaucratic callings. Less than thirty, he had the hairless head of a young senior official, the verbal fluency of a Congress demagogue, and the dominating, false-sincere eyes of a manipulator of meetings.".

According to a fellow member of RAPP, Anna Karavayeva:

Someone once spoke of Leopold Averbakh as a harsh, yet knowledgeable, man. A publicist, an agitator, he wanted to organize everything according to a designated ‘proletarian base,’ as he explained. Correctly acknowledging that there was a class war in literature, Averbakh, in my opinion, presented it very narrowly, not wanting to comprehend the specifics."

== His treatment of eminent writers ==
Averbakh's influence reached its peak in 1929, when he orchestrated public campaigns against the writers Yevgeny Zamyatin, who was driven into exile, and Boris Pilnyak, and the Old Bolshevik and critic, Aleksandr Voronsky, founder of the literary journal, Krasnaya Nov. Reviewing a short story by Andrei Platonov in 1929, Averbakh warned: "There is ambiguity in it...our era does not tolerate any ambiguity." When Nadezhda Mandelstam challenged him to explain how he could denounce her husband's poetry without having read it, he replied "that there is no such thing as art or culture in the abstract, but only 'bourgeois art' and 'proletarian art'." By contrast, Averbakh went to pains to cultivate Russia's most famous living writer, Maxim Gorky, after being introduced to him by Yagoda. He spent the summer of 1931 as a house guest in Gorky's home in Sorrento, on a mission to persuade Gorky to return permanently to Russia. On his return, he reported to Yagoda that he was "proud and happy" to have succeeded.

== Dissolution of RAPP ==
On 23 April 1932, Stalin ordered suddenly and unexpectedly RAPP, and all other literary clubs and movements to disband and merge into the newly formed Soviet Writers' Union. It was immediately understood that this move was intended to destroy Averbakh's power base. When Nadezhda Mandelstam visited Herzen House in Leningrad the day after the announcement, she found two eminent writers, Nikolai Tikhonov and Pyotr Pavlenko, drinking wine to celebrate Averbakh's downfall. When she protested: "I thought you were a friend of Averbakh" – Pavlenko replied: "The war in literature has entered a new phase." Averbakh's fall may have been Stalin's way of striking at his powerful brother-in-law Yagoda, but also seems to have been brought about by his own overconfidence and lack of deference. As early as 1929, Stalin complained in a letter to his deputy Vyacheslav Molotov about certain young communists, including Averbakh, who treated the party as a "discussion club" where they could "review policy" instead of awaiting instructions.

== Later career and arrest ==
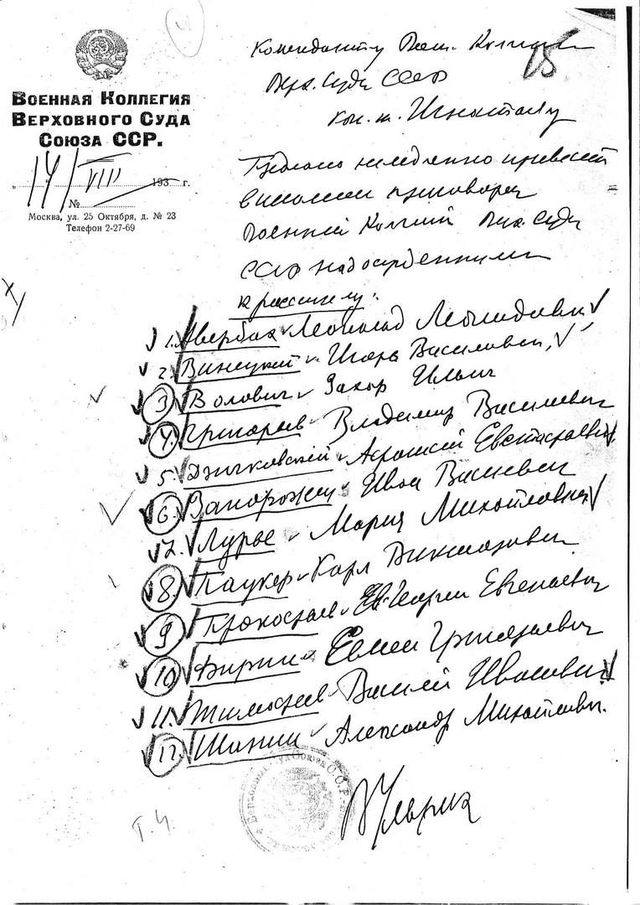
Order of Vasily Ulrich on the immediate execution of 12 people convicted by the Military Collegium of the Supreme Court of the USSR. Averbakh is number 1

Most of Averbakh's former colleagues in RAPP, with the notable exception of the playwright Vladimir Kirshon, deserted him after this public humiliation, but he continued to enjoy the protection of Yagoda, and of Maxim Gorky. In 1935, Gorky, Averbakh and the NKVD officer Semyon Firin, the deputy head of Gulag, co-edited a book lauding construction of the White Sea–Baltic Canal by convict labour. Gorky's death and Yagoda's downfall left him unprotected. He was arrested in April 1937, and shot on 14 August 1937, along with Kirshon, Firin and others.
