= Rodion Beresov =

Russian-American poet, writer and playwright (1896–1988)

- Born: Rodion Mikhailovich Akulshin (Russian: Родион Михайлович Акульшин); April 8, 1896; Vilovatoye, Samara Governorate, Russian Empire
- Died: June 25, 1988 (aged 92); Ashford, Connecticut, U.S.
- Other names: Rodion Michael Akulshin; Ivan Korsakov; Dmitry Novosyolov; D. B.
- Citizenship: Soviet, American
- Occupations: Writer, poet, playwright
- Years active: 1924–1988

Rodion Michael Beresov (né Akulshin (Note: Russian: Родион Михайлович Акульшин, romanized: Rodion Mikhailovich Akulshin), April 8, 1896 – June 25, 1988), also spelled variously as Berezov and Beryozov, was a Russian-American poet, playwright, and writer of Christian and children's books.

== Biography ==
Rodion Mikhailovich Akulshin, later known by the pseudonym Rodion Beresov, was born on April 8, 1896 in the village of Vilovatoye in Samara Governorate, in a poor peasant family, as the youngest of 13 children. His mother in his youth was considered the best songwriter in the village, whereas his father was a good storyteller. The eldest brother was a garmon player. From the age of seven he performed at village weddings as a jester, for which he received from 10 to 50 kopecks. Beresov's older brothers worked as painters and roofers. After primary school, he entered a two-grade school, then a teacher's seminary, after graduating from which in 1915 he began teaching. Until the autumn of 1923, Beresov worked as a teacher in the villages of Sorochinskoye and Vilovatoye, in Buzuluk, and in Samara.

Since the autumn of 1923 Beresov lived in Moscow, where he studied at the Valery Bryusov Higher Literary and Artistic Institute. As a poet, he was first published in the magazine Delegatka in 1924. In January 1925, he wrote his first prose essay. After he graduated from the Children's Section of the State Publishing House (Gosizdat), he became its secretary (the chairman of the section at that time was Vera Inber), kicking off his career as a children's writer. In the 1920s and 1930s, Beresov published about 40 small books, many of which were created specifically for children and young people, and were extremely popular among readers. The main theme of Beresov's work in those years was propaganda of the achievements of the USSR and the Communist Party.

Until 1932, Beresov was a member of the literary group Pereval, organized by Alexander Voronsky at the magazine Krasnaya Nov. With the beginning of World War II, in 1941, he was mobilized into the people's militia. On October 5, 1941, in a battle near Yelnya, Beresov was captured and sent to Germany, where he was recruited to work in the German propaganda department. He collaborated with the newspaper Novy Put. Together with Sergey Shirokov, he co-authored a propaganda radio play titled Wolf about a Soviet partisan who became a Nazi collaborationist.

In 1945 Beresov was released by American troops from the concentration camp he was held in, and ended up in a displaced persons camp. Realizing that either prison or execution awaited him in his homeland, he did not want to return to the USSR and emigrated to the United States, assuming the identity of Polish-born Rodion Michael Beresov. He was later brought to trial for deceiving immigration authorities, but was pardoned given the circumstances that necessitated the forgery. Beresov's case was handled personally by Senator John Kennedy.

Beresov settled in Los Angeles and accepted the Baptist faith. He was an active parishioner of the Evangelical Slavic Center church. In exile, Beresov wrote and published about a dozen books of poems, novels, stories and essays that were not widely distributed or known in his homeland, the USSR. He spent his last years in a nursing home, bedridden. Beresov died on June 25, 1988, in Ashford, Connecticut.
