= Illarion Mgeladze =

Georgian revolutionary (1890–1941)

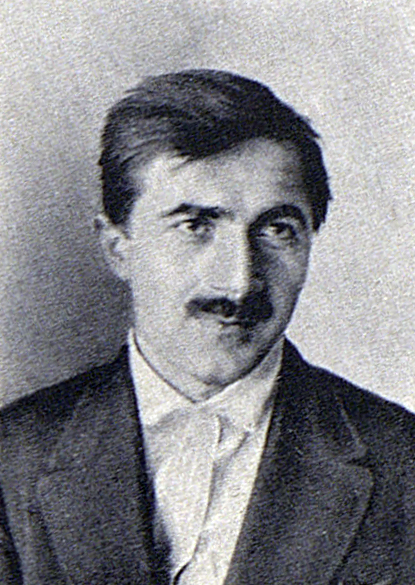
- Illarion Mgeladze
- Born: 1890; Lanchkhuti, Russian Empire
- Died: July 27, 1941 (aged 50–51); Moscow, Soviet Union
- Military Service
- Allegiance: Russian SFSR
- Branch: Red Army
- Unit: 1st Cavalry Army
- Conflicts: Russian Civil War

Illarion Vissarionovich Mgeladze (Georgian: ილარიონ ბესარიონის ძე მგელაძე; 1890, Lanchkhuti – 27 July 1941) (pseudonym – Ilya Vardin ) was a Georgian Marxist revolutionary, writer, literary critic and journalist active in the Russian Social Democratic Labour Party and later the Soviet Union.

== Early career ==
Mgeladze was born in Georgia. His family were peasants. He joined the Bolsheviks in 1906. In 1910 he was a member of the Moscow Committee of the Russian Social Democratic Labour Party (RSDLP). Later he moved to Saratov, where he edited the newspaper Sotsial-Demokrat. He moved to Moscow after the October Revolution, and served as a political commissar with the 1st Cavalry Army during the civil war. In 1920, he was a member of the bureau of the Kyiv Provincial Communist Party Committee, then later worked for the press of the Central Committee.

== Literary career ==
Using his literary pseudonym, Ilya Vardin, Mgeladze was a founder of the All-Russian Association of Proletarian Writers (VAPP), and editor of its magazine, Na Postu (On Guard), launched in 1923. VAPP was the largest of several organisations that sought to promote 'proletarian literature' in the Soviet Union in the early 1920s, believing that 'bourgeois' culture – ie works written by persons who were not manual workers – was not suited to organising the psychology of the proletariat. Varin maintained that "if literature is not won by the proletariat, then it will serve the bourgeoisie." VAPP aggressively attacked the novelists and poets who were being published in the Soviet Union, who were not proletarians. According to the writer, Ilya Ehrenburg, "the Na Postu group abused everybody – Alexey Tolstoy and Mayakovsky, Vsevolod Ivanov and Yesenin, Akhmatova and Veresayev." They also constantly attacked the magazine Krasnaya Nov and its editor, Aleksandr Voronsky, for publishing literature by 'fellow travellers' -ie writers sympathetic to the revolution who were not proletarian. Vardin accused Voronsky of having "become a weapon in the cause of reinforcing the position of the bourgeoisie."

In May 1924, the press department of the Central Committee organised a debate on the politics of literature, at which Vardin acted as the main spokesman for the 'proletarian' side, and was answered by Leon Trotsky, who accused him of adopting "an amazingly supercilious tone, but deadly little knowledge or understanding – no understanding of art as art, that is as a particular field of human creativity."

Afterwards, the Politburo adopted a cautiously worded resolution that warned against a "frivolous and careless" attitude to the old cultural legacy, and that the party should 'fight attempts at purely hothouse 'proletarian' literature". Vardin refused to accept what was now official party policy, which caused a rift within VAPP. He was ousted from the leadership, and VAPP was wound up and its place taken by RAPP (the Russian Association of Proletarian Writers), led by Leopold Averbakh.

== Expulsion, arrests and death ==
In the power struggles after Lenin's in 1924, Vardin supported Grigory Zinoviev against Trotsky, and then against Stalin. He was expelled from the All-Union Communist Party (b) in December 1927, arrested and sentence to three years exile in Biysk. He recanted in 1928 and was readmitted to the party, only to be arrested again on 20 December 1934, in the wake of the assassination of Sergei Kirov. In January 1935, he was sentenced to five years in prison, but when his sentence ended, in 1940, he was arrested again, and sentenced to death at a closed trial on 7 July 1941, and shot three weeks later.

== Family ==
Mgeladze's wife, Emma Reinovna Peterson, was a linguist, who worked for Comintern, and was arrested and shot in 1937. Their son, Leonid, was arrested as a member of a family of an 'enemy of the people' and sentenced to five years in prison, then was conscripted and sent to the front line during the war with Germany, but survived to become an eminent saxophonist. His wife, Natalya Melekhova, a folk singer was travelling by train to Riga when she went into labour. Their son, Yuri Peterson (1947–2019) became one of Russia's best known singers.

== Works ==
- Политические партии и русская революция (Political parties and the Russian revolution) Moscow: Krasnaya Nov, 1922
- Партия меньшевиков и русская революция (The Menshevik Party and the Russian Revolution) Moscow: Krasnaya Nov, 1922
