= Vladimir Bakhmetyev =

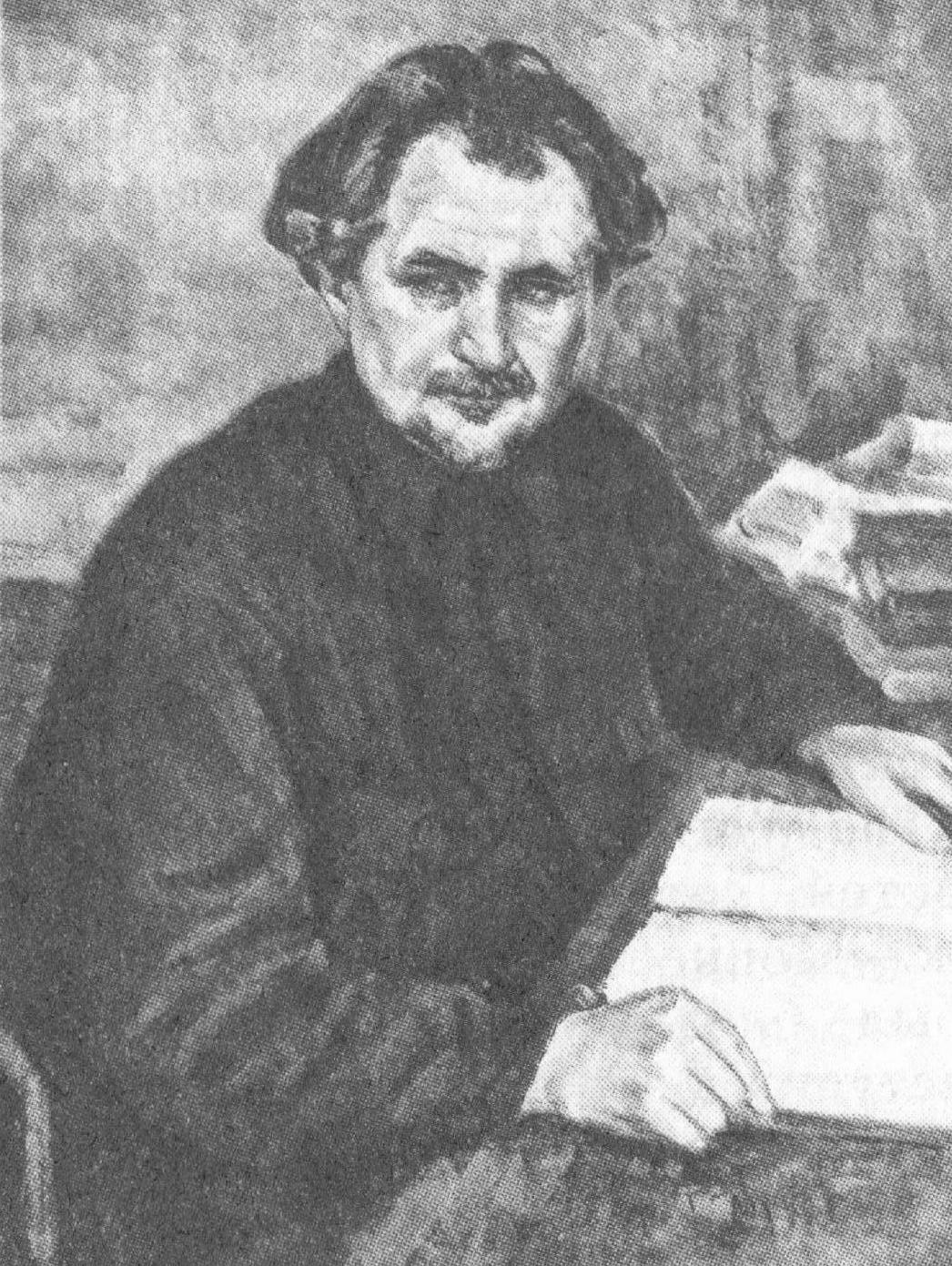
- Portrait of Vladimir Bakhmetyev
- Born: August 14, 1885; Zemlyansk, Voronezh Governorate, Russian Empire
- Died: October 16, 1966 (aged 81); Moscow, Russian SFSR, Soviet Union
- Occupations: Writer, journalist, literary critic
- Writing career
- Literary movement: Socialist realism

Vladimir Matveevich Bakhmetyev (Russian: Владимир Матвеевич Бахметьев; 14 August 1885 – 16 October 1966) was a Russian Soviet writer, literary critic and journalist.

== Biography ==
Vladimir Bakhmetyev was born in to the family of a minor official who worked as a clerk in the district zemstvo government. In 1905, together with his wife (a typist for the council), he published the underground magazine “Red Lapot” on a hectograph, and published there his first poems, short stories and stories dedicated to the life of the peasantry. At the same time he became interested in revolutionary work, for which in 1908 he was arrested and exiled to Barnaul. From there the writer moved to Novonikolaevsk, where he joined the ranks of the Bolshevik faction of the RSDLP in 1909.

From 1911 to 1914, Bakhmetyev wrote for multiple magazine, both as a fiction writer and literary critic, where he predominantly defended the realist style. From 1914, he lived and worked in Tomsk and started to work together with Vyacheslav Shishkov and published stories and tales that were published in the Siberian and metropolitan press.

In 1915, the writer was arrested again for distributing anti-war propaganda literature. After the February Revolution, he headed the department of public education in the City Duma in Tomsk and edited the party newspaper “Sibirsky Rabochiy”, and was also the commissar for public education of Western Siberia.

In 1921, he moved to Moscow, where he worked at the Gosizdat. Later Bakhmetyev became a member of the literary group “Kuznitsa” and the executive editor of its magazine. He published his first book of stories “On Earth” (1924), the novel “Martyn’s Crime” (1928), set during the Russian Revolution and the Civil War, which attracted great attention. From 1934 he was a member of the first board of the Union of Soviet Writers. He lived in Moscow in the famous “House of Writers' Cooperative”.

After the Second World War, always remaining in line with realism, Bakhmetyev published a number of stories, the theme of which was the heroism of Soviet soldiers on the battlefield. He died in 1966 and was buried at the Novodevichy Cemetery in Moscow.

== Works ==
- На земле, 1924
- Преступление Мартына, 1928
- Наступление, 1938, в переработанном виде под названием «У порога», 1941
- Собр. соч. В 3-х тт., 1926–30
- Избранное, 1947, 1953
- Избр. произв. В 2-х тт., 1957
