= Fyodor Raskolnikov =

Soviet politician (1892–1939)

- Фёдор Раскольников
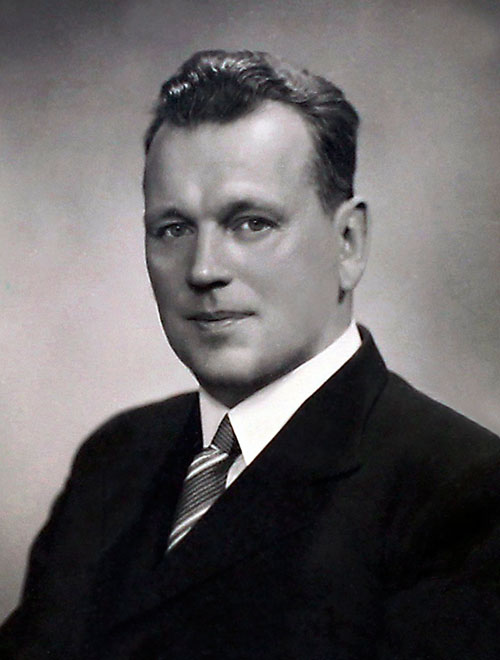
- Born: Fyodor Fyodorovich Ilyin; 28 January 1892; Saint Petersburg, Russian Empire
- Died: 12 September 1939 (aged 47); Nice, France
- Citizenship: Russian Empire; Soviet Union
- Occupations: Journalist, diplomat, writer
- Spouse: Larissa Reissner (1918–1924)
- Awards: Order of the Red Banner

Fyodor Fyodorovich Raskolnikov (Russian: Фёдор Фёдорович Раскольников; 28 January 1892 – 12 September 1939), real name Fyodor Ilyin (Russian: Фёдор Ильин), was an Old Bolshevik, politician, participant in the October Revolution, writer, journalist, commander of Red fleets on the Caspian and the Baltic during the Russian Civil War, and later a Soviet diplomat.

== Career ==
=== Early life ===
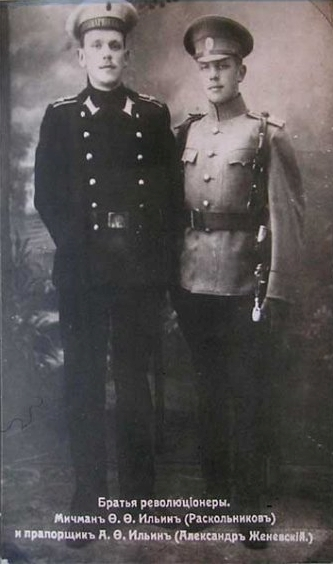
Raskolnikov and his brother Alexander

Fyodor Raskolnikov was born to a general's daughter, A. V. Ilyina, and an Orthodox priest F.A. Petrov (according to other sources, archpriest Sergushenkov). Alternatively, "... his father was Fedor Ilyin, a progressive St. Petersburg churchman, a widower who could not legally remarry and whose sons were therefore technically illegitimate. The Ilyin family life was fairly normal ..." He graduated from Prince Oldenburgsky Orphanage, studied at Saint Petersburg Polytechnical Institute, and then at the Midshipman (gardemarin) School in Saint Petersburg.

In December 1910 he joined the Bolshevik faction of the Russian Social Democratic Labour Party, and he was attracted to Zvezda and went on to work for the Bolshevik newspaper, Pravda. He was arrested, and allowed to emigrate, but after running into trouble with the German police, he returned illegally to Russia, and was again arrested and exiled to Arkhangelsk, but released in 1913 under the amnesty called to mark the 300th anniversary of the Romanov dynasty. He enlisted in the navy on the outbreak of war, and in 1917 he received the Naval rank of Midshipman (michman), but he did not participate in World War I.

== Revolution and Civil War ==
In March 1917 he was sent to the sea fortress of Kronstadt, where he edited the newspaper Golos Pravdy (Voice of Truth): an incarnation of the forbidden-at-that-time Pravda newspaper. He was one of the organizers of the Kronstadt Mutiny in July 1917. He was arrested by troops loyal to the Russian Provisional Government but released on October 11, 1917, a few weeks before the October Revolution.

=== Civil War ===
In November 1917 Raskolnikov with a group of Kronstadt seamen was sent to fight anti-Bolshevik insurgents in Moscow. He was elected to the Russian Constituent Assembly. On 29 January 1918 he became the deputy Narkom of "Naval Affairs". In summer 1918, he married Larisa Reisner. In July 1918, he was sent to Kazan as the Commissar (member of Revvoeyensovet) of the Eastern Front. On the Eastern Front, he commanded, starting in August 1918, the Red Volga Flotilla, which participated in the Kazan Operation. In the summer of 1918, Raskolnikov married the revolutionary and writer, Larissa Reissner.

Raskolnikov was promoted to membership of the Revvoeyensovet of the Russian Socialist Federative Soviet Republic on September 2, 1918. At the end of 1918, he became the deputy commander of the 7th Army and the Commissar of the Baltic Fleet.

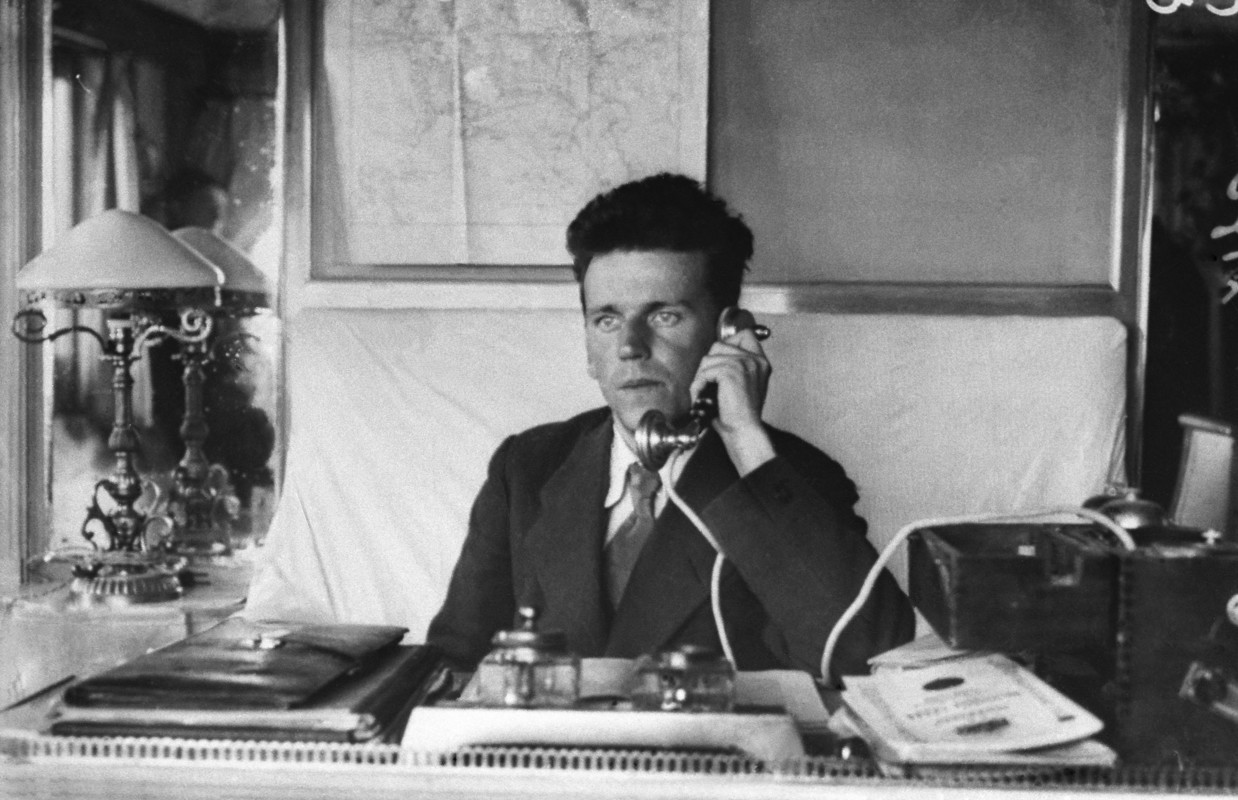
Raskolnikov on the Mezhen ship, 1920

While commanding a fleet consisting of a battleship, cruiser and two destroyers that were supposed to counter the British fleet, he became a prisoner of war when his destroyer Spartak was captured by the Royal Navy off the coast of Estonia in December 1918, and held in Brixton prison until May 27, 1919, when he was exchanged for 17 British prisoners of war. Appointed commander of the Caspian Flotilla he led the assault on the British base at Enzeli, on May 18, 1920 which captured what remained of the White Russian navy and British garrison stationed there, and established the short-lived Iranian Socialist Soviet Republic, in northern Iran.

=== Soviet service ===
In August 1920, Raskolnikov wrote a report warning that the shipbuilding facilities in Petrograd had been so sorely depleted of technical specialists during the civil war that they were not capable even of repairing damaged ships. He called for a recruitment drive, a wage system based on piece work, and an end to 'interference' by the Metal Workers' Union. During the trade-union debate from 1920 to 1921, Raskolnikov supported Leon Trotsky's position of taking a hard line about state control of unions. From June 1920 to January 1921, Raskolnikov commanded the Baltic Fleet. During his tenure, relations between the commanding officers and seamen deteriorated, and tensions would culminate a few weeks later with the Kronstadt rebellion of March 1921.

In 1921, Raskolnikov became the ambassador to Afghanistan, the first country that established diplomatic relations with the Soviet state. Raskolnikov's actions caused a diplomatic rift with Great Britain, and the British government insisted on his removal. In 1923, he was replaced.

In January 1924, shortly after their return from Afghanistan, Larissa Reissner and Raskolnikov divorced.

== Literary career ==
In 1924–30, Raskolnikov worked in literature as editor-in-chief of the literary magazine Molodaya Gvardiya (Young Guard), that was an organ of the Komsomol, and head of the publishing house publishing house Moskovsky Rabochy.

He arrived at a time of an angry controversy within the communist party over whether Soviet journals should be publishing by writers from comfortable family backgrounds who sympathised with the revolution – the so-called 'fellow travelers' – or concentrating exclusively on developing 'proletarian literature'. When the press department of the Central Committee organised a debate between the two sides, in May 1924, Raskolnikov gave a speech which Leon Trotsky praised as "the most distinctive expression" of the 'proletarian' side of the argument, which Trotsky opposed.

In June 1924, the Central Committee appointed him an editor of Krasnaya Nov, which had specialised in publishing the works of fellow travelers, under its incumbent chief editor, Aleksandr Voronsky. He delayed taking up the appointment because he had contracted tuberculosis, and went to Italy for a sun cure. After his return, Krasnaya Nov was filled with articles by advocates of proletarian literature, such Ilya Vardin, whom Voronsky had refused to publish. But Raskolnikov was ousted from the magazine early in 1925, possibly because Maxim Gorky had angrily refused to contribute while he was in charge. He was reinstated in May 1927.

In 1928 he was the chairman of the Repertory Committee, the de facto main censor of theatre and cinematography. He also wrote his own play Robespierre which even servile critics labelled "dry and boring".

== Later diplomatic career ==
From 1930 Raskolnikov was the plenipotentiary representative to Estonia 1930–33, and Denmark 1933–34. When diplomatic relations with Bulgaria were re-established in August 1934, after they had been severed since the Russian Revolution, Raskolnikov was appointed head of the diplomatic mission in Sofia.

== Defection ==
In March 1938 he was recalled from Sofia to the USSR, but on April 1 refused to return. He moved with his family to France. In 1939 he published his famous Open Letter to Stalin in which he criticized Stalin's repressions during the Great Terror and the emerging German-Soviet alliance.

Not long after the signing of the Molotov–Ribbentrop Pact, Raskolnikov was admitted to a mental hospital because the signing of the pact was a severe shock to him. He promptly died from "falling out of a window" while staying in the hospital. According to the writer Nina Berberova, Raskolnikov committed suicide. This account was contested by Raskolnikov's wife at the time, who claimed her husband died of pneumonia.

According to the historian Roy Medvedev, Raskolnikov might have been assassinated by NKVD agents. There are theories that the assassin might have been Sergei Efron, the husband of the poet Marina Tsvetaeva.

Raskolnikov was posthumously rehabilitated in 1963. However, "Around the end of the decade his photographs disappeared from reference books, and editors mentioning him favourably were reprimanded or dismissed. Finally, in February 1969 the Party organ, Kommunist, categorised him as 'a deserter to the side of the enemy and a slanderer of the Party and the Soviet state'." His reputation would be restored during the Glasnost period, with the publication of his Open Letter to Stalin in the Soviet press.

== See also ==
- Kazan Operation
- Death barge

Diplomatic posts
Preceded by Adolf Petrovsky	Plenipotentiary Representative of the Soviet Union in Estonia; 1930–1933	Succeeded by Aleksey Ustinov
