= Death barge =

Floating prisons used during Russian Civil War

Death barges (Russian: Ба́ржи сме́рти) were floating prisons used by both sides during the Russian Civil War in 1918–19, primarily in the Volga basin. They were mainly used to keep potential political enemies imprisoned, rather than as execution facilities. In case of a quickly advancing hostile army, they could be quickly dragged away, or sunk in a fairway, thus both liquidating enemy sympathizers and hampering the enemy navy's navigation.

The first usage of death barges was recorded in Yaroslavl during the Left SR uprising in 1918. It is also known that one death barge with Soviet sympathizers was hijacked by towboat under Fedor Raskolnikov.
