= Pushkin House =

Russian Academy of Sciences institution in St. Petersburg

Coordinates: 59.9448°N 30.3012°E

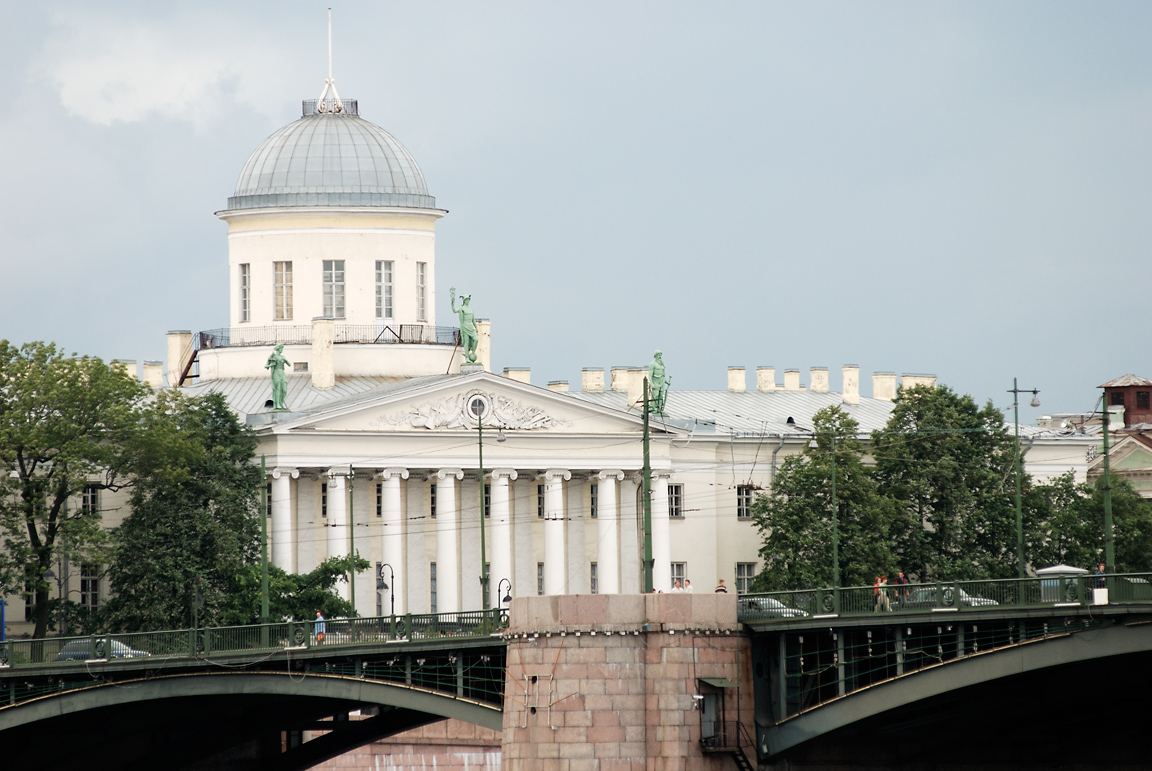
Pushkin House as seen across the Malaya Neva and Exchange Bridge. The pediment is crowned with the bronze statues of Neptune, Mercury, and Ceres.

The Pushkin House (Russian: Пушкинский дом, romanized: Pushkinsky Dom), formally the Institute of Russian Literature (Институт русской литературы), is a research institute in St. Petersburg. It is part of a network of institutions affiliated with the Russian Academy of Sciences.

== History ==
=== Establishment ===
The Russian Literature Institute began its life in December 1905 as the main centre for Alexander Pushkin studies in Imperial Russia. A commission in charge of erecting a Pushkin monument in St. Petersburg, led by Sergei Oldenburg and Aleksey Shakhmatov, suggested a permanent institution be set up to preserve original Pushkin manuscripts:

Would it not be more appropriate to erect a monument to Alexander Pushkin not in the form of a statue, but in the form of a special museum? This museum, which is to bear Pushkin's name, will encompass everything concerning our outstanding artists of the word, including their manuscripts, personal belongings, first editions of their works.

The idea won support from all sides and was welcomed by Grand Duke Constantine Constantinovich. It was understood that the Pushkin House would be housed in a purpose-built Neoclassical edifice, or Odeon, but the idea failed to materialize owing to a lack of funds.

In 1907 Vladimir Kokovtsov, Minister of Finance, came up with the proposal to acquire a huge collection of Pushkin manuscripts and memorabilia amassed in Paris by Alexander Onegin from 1879 onwards. The negotiations dragged on until Onegin's death in 1925, but the bulk of his collection eventually ended up in Russia.

=== Soviet era ===
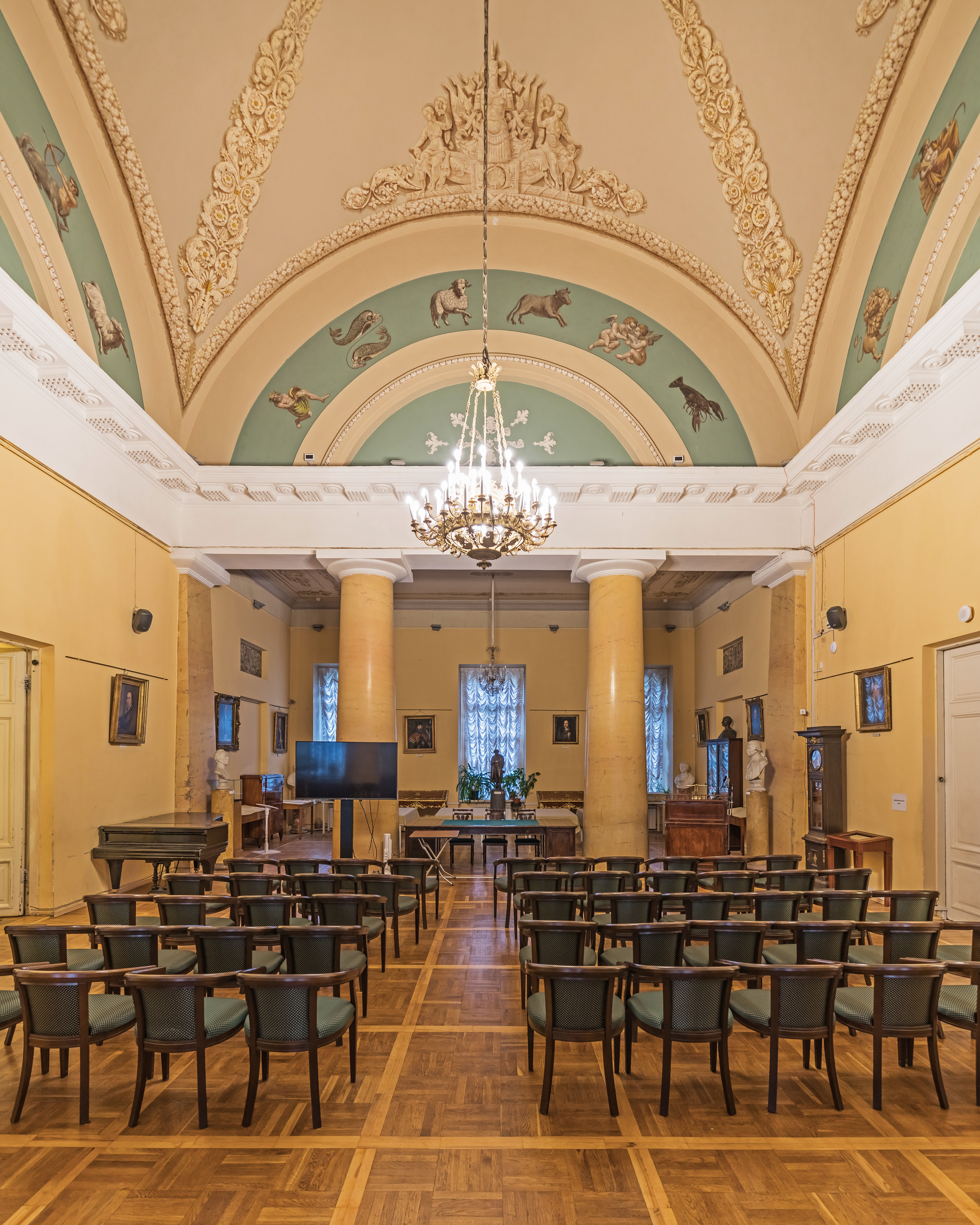
The Neoclassical interior

The Pushkin House was originally a non-governmental organization specializing in Pushkin studies, which have been recognized by Russian authorities as a separate branch of scholarly inquiry. The Russian Revolution led to the shutdown of all non-governmental institutions, but the Pushkin House was spared and put under the umbrella of the Russian Academy of Sciences (in 1918). Such "honorary" directors as Anatoly Lunacharsky, Lev Kamenev and Maksim Gorky ensured its safe passage through the hardships of the Revolution.

In 1927 Pushkin House moved from the crammed rooms in the Academy of Sciences building to the magnificent neo-Palladian Customs House, built after Giovanni Francesco Lucchini's designs in 1829–1832 and situated just around the Strelka. It was to the original Kunstkamera rooms that Alexander Blok referred in his last poem To Pushkin House, celebrating Pushkin's heritage as a gleam of hope during the chaos and confusion of the post-revolutionary years:

Pushkin House! A name apart,
A name with meaning for the heart!

The Pushkin House remained open during the Siege of Leningrad, although most of the staff and manuscripts were evacuated to other cities. Following the war the institute continued, employing such scholars as Boris Eikhenbaum and Dmitry Likhachov.

== Structure ==
The collections of the Pushkin House, partly housed in a modern block hidden behind the Neoclassical facade, include numerous manuscripts from the 13th century onward, portraits and personal documents of leading Russian authors, as well as a galaxy of rare music recordings. The institution has a complex structure and is subdivided into several departments:

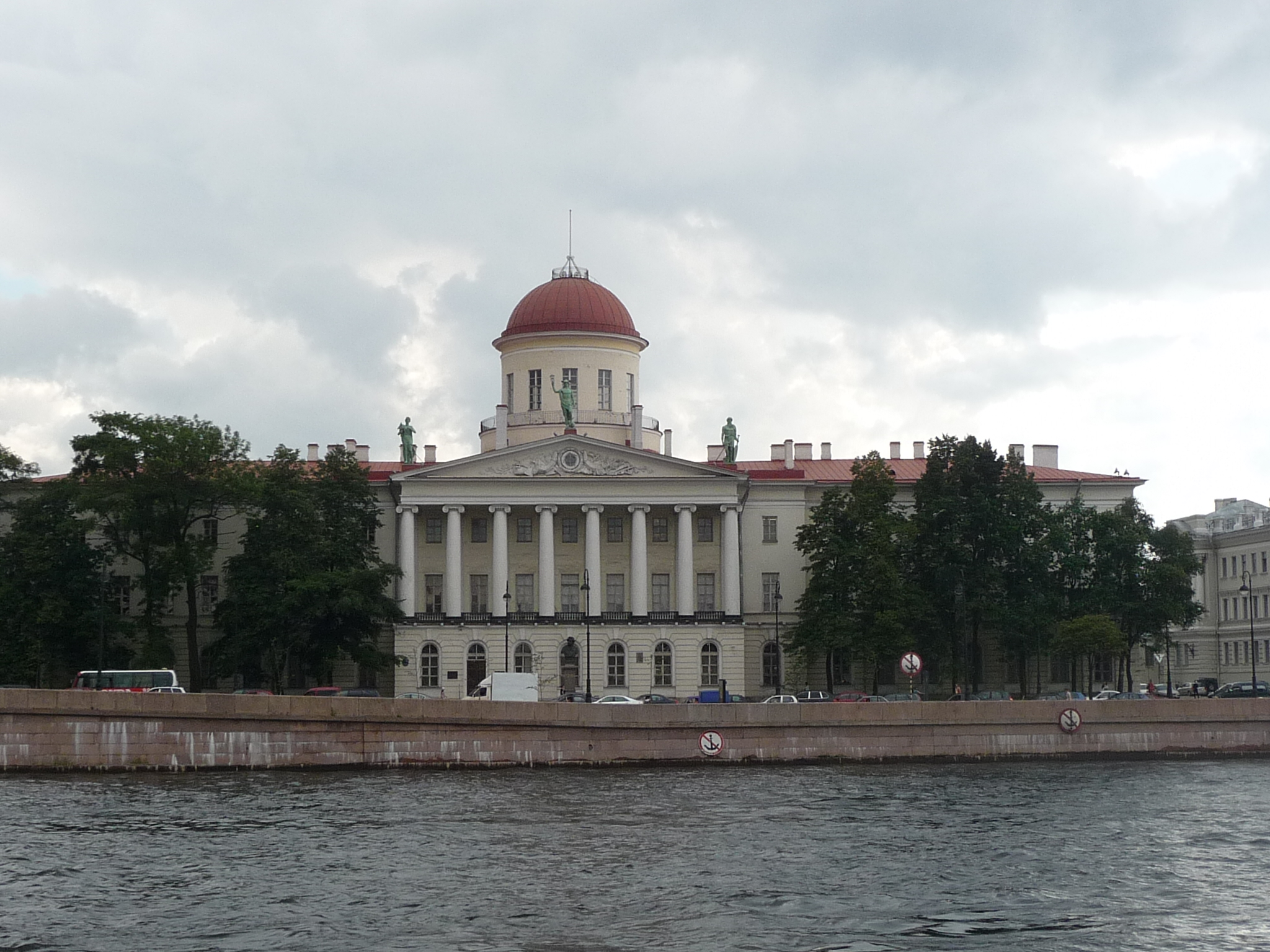
The Institute of Russian Literature, as seen from across the Malaya Neva

- Department of Old Russian Literature
- Department of Russian Folklore and Records Archive
- Department of New Russian Literature
- Department of Pushkin Studies
- Department of Recent Russian Literature
- Correlation of Russian and Foreign Literature Department
- Bibliography and Sources Department
- Manuscript Division and Archive of Ancient Relics
- Museum of Literature (Литературный музей)

The Pushkin memorial houses in Mikhailovskoye, Trigorskoye, Tsarskoe Selo, and on the Moyka River are also affiliated with the Pushkin House.

== Directors ==
Years	Director
1910–1922	acad. Nestor Kotlyarevsky
1922–1924	Corresponding Member USSR Academy of Sciences B.L. Modzalevsky (acting)
1924–1925	acad. Nestor Kotlyarevsky
1925–1929	acad. Sergey Platonov
1929–1930	acad. Pavel Sakulin
1930–1931	Corresponding Member Academy of Sciences of the USSR N.K. Kozmin (acting)
1931–1933	acad. Anatoly Lunacharsky
1934	Lev Kamenev
1935–1936	Maxim Gorky
1937–1948	acad. P. I. Lebedev-Poliansky
1948–1949	Doctor of Philosophy L.A. Plotkin (acting)
1949–1955	Corresponding Member USSR Academy of Sciences Nikolay Belchikov
1955–1965	acad. A. S. Bushmin
1965–1975	Corresponding Member USSR Academy of Sciences V. G. Bazanov
1975–1977	Doctor of Philosophy F. Ya. Priyma (acting)
1978–1983	acad. Alexei Bushmin
1983–1987	Doctor of Philosophy A.N. Jesuitov
1987–2005	Corresponding Member RAS N. N. Skatov
2006–2007	Ph.D. Yu.M. Prozorov (acting)
2007–2017	Corresponding Member RAS V. E. Bagno
since 2017	Doctor of Philosophy V. V. Golovin
