= Cement (novel) =

1925 novel by Fyodor Gladkov

- Cover
- Author: Fyodor Gladkov
- Original title: Цемент
- Language: Russian
- Genre: Socialist realism
- Publication date: 1925

Cement (Russian: Цемент) is a socialist realism novel by Soviet and Russian writer Fyodor Gladkov (1883–1958). Published in 1925, the book is arguably the first in Soviet socialist realist literature to depict the struggles of post-Revolutionary reconstruction.

The protagonist, Gleb Chumalov, is a returning Red Army soldier who, after the Russian Civil War, comes back to a hometown in painful transition and to its cement factory being reorganized for the massive new Soviet effort. His wife, Dasha, plays the role of the Soviet "new woman", and Gleb finds he cannot easily pick up the threads of their old relationship. The novel is Gladkov's best known work because of its portrayal of the sociological effects of early Communism, especially after the sexes are suddenly decreed equal in the labor force of the local cement factory.

Cement was adapted into a stage play by German writer, poet, and theatre director Heiner Müller (1929–1995); the play premiered at the Berliner Ensemble in 1973.

== Publication history ==
- Gladkov, Fyodor Vasilievich (1980). Cement. Translated by Arthur, A.S.; Ashleigh, C. Edward Vavra (afterword). New York: Frederick Ungar Publishing Company. ISBN 0-8044-6178-3.
- Gladkov, Fyodor Vasilievich (1994). Cement. Evanston: Northwestern University Press. ISBN 0-8101-1160-8.
