= Vyacheslav Polonsky =

Russian literary critic and journalist

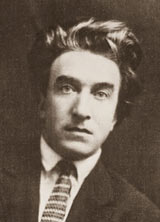
Vyacheslav Polonsky in 1920

Vyacheslav Pavlovich Polonsky (June 23, 1886 – February 24, 1932) - the pen name of Vyacheslav Pavlovich Gusin - was a Russian literary critic, journalist and historian who was active in the Soviet Union in the 1920s up to his death in 1932. He was particularly involved in a controversy over competing accounts of the life of Mikhail Bakunin.

An abbreviated version of his essay "Lenin's views of art and culture" was published by Max Eastman in his book Artists in Uniform: a Study of Literature and Bureaucratism published in 1934.

== General references ==
- Stacy, R. H. (1 April 1974). Russian Literary Criticism: A Short History. Syracuse University Press. p. 198. ISBN 978-0-8156-0108-1.
