= Georgy Chulkov =

Russian writer (1879–1939)

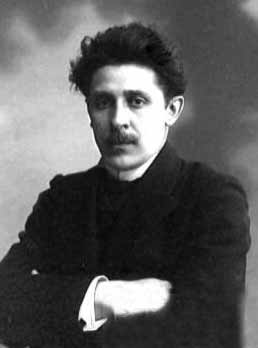
Georgy Chulkov

Georgy Ivanovich Chulkov (Russian: Гео́ргий Ива́нович Чулко́в, IPA: [ɡʲɪˈorɡʲɪj ɪˈvanəvʲɪtɕ tɕʊlˈkof]; 1 February [O.S. 20 January] 1879 – January 1, 1939) was a Russian Symbolist poet, editor, writer and critic. In 1906 he created and popularized the theory of Mystical Anarchism.

== Biography ==
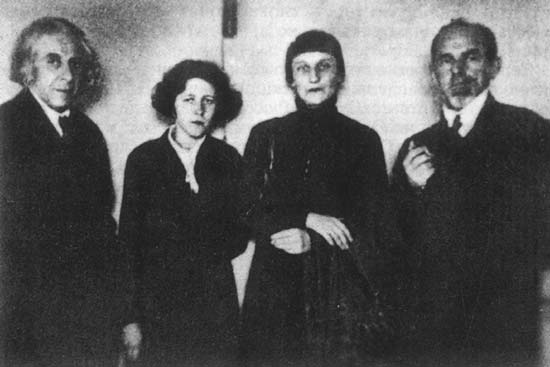
Poets of Silver Age. Left to right: Georgy Chulkov, Mariya Petrovykh, Anna Akhmatova, Osip Mandelstam. 1930s

Chulkov was born in Moscow in the family of an impoverished Tambov nobleman. He studied medicine at Moscow University in 1898–1901. After joining a revolutionary student organization, he was arrested in December 1901 and exiled to Amga in the Yakutsk region of Siberia. He was amnestied in 1903 and was allowed to settle in Nizhny Novgorod, where he lived for a year. In 1904 Chulkov moved to St. Petersburg and became the de facto editor of Novy Put' (New Path), a literary magazine published by Dmitry Merezhkovsky and Zinaida Gippius. When the publication of Novy Put' was suspended in January 1905 during the turmoil of the Russian Revolution of 1905, Chulkov moved to Voprosy Zhizni (Problems of Life), its replacement, where he worked with its editors Nikolai Berdyaev, Sergei Bulgakov and Nikolai Lossky until it folded in December 1905.

In 1906, Chulkov edited Fakely (Torches), an anthology of Symbolist writing, which called on Russian writers to:

abandon Symbolism and Decadence and move forward to "new mystical experience".

Later in the year Chulkov followed up with a "Mystical Anarchism" manifesto. Russian poets Alexander Blok and especially Vyacheslav Ivanov were supportive of the new movement while Valery Bryusov, the editor of the leading Symbolist magazine Vesy (The Balance), and Andrei Bely were opposed to it.

Chulkov published a number of novels, poems and short story collections between 1906 and the outbreak of World War I in 1914, when he joined the Russian army. After the war and the Russian Civil War that followed, Chulkov returned to writing, but found it difficult to publish poetry and fiction under the new Soviet regime: for example, his unpublished poems made fun of Marxism. After 1922 he concentrated on literary criticism and Russian history. Between 1925 and 1939 he published books about the Decembrist revolt, Fyodor Tyutchev, Alexander Pushkin, Fyodor Dostoyevsky, Don Quixote and the Romanov dynasty in the nineteenth century.

Georgy Chulkov died in 1939 from emphysema. He was buried in Moscow at the Novodevichy Cemetery.

== Works ==
=== Novels ===
- Satana (Satan), 1914, 185p.
- Serezha Nestroev, 1916, 182p.
- Metel', 1917, 190p.

=== Collections ===
- Kremnistyj put', 1904, 141p.
- Vesnoyu na sewer, 1908, 86p.
- Lyudi v tumane, 1916, 177p.
- Vchera i segodnya, 1916, 166p.
- Posramlenye besy, 1921, 127p.
- Nashi sputniki, 1922, 199p.
- Stihotvoreniya (Poems), Moscow, Zadruga, 1922, 112p.
- Vechernie zori: rasskazy, Moscow, Zemlya i fabrika, 1924, 91p.
- Valtasarovo tsarstvo (Balthazar's kingdom, reprint collection), Moscow, Respublika, 1998, ISBN 5-250-02491-2, 607p.

=== Non-fiction ===
- O misticheskom anarkhizme, 1906, 57p.
  - English translation: On Mystical Anarchism in Russian Titles for the Specialist no. 16, Letchworth, Prideaux P., 1971.
  - English translation: On Mystical Anarchism in A Revolution of the Spirit: Crisis of value in Russia, 1890-1924, ed. Bernice Glatzer Rosenthal. Fordham, 1990, pp. 175–186.
- Demons and Modern Life in Apollon, nos. 1–2, St. Petersburg, 1914.
  - English translation in: A Picasso Anthology: Documents, Criticism, Reminiscences, ed. Marilyn McCully, Princeton, 1982, p. 104-106.
- Nashi sputniki: Literaturnye ocherki, Moscow, 1922.
- Myatezhniki 1825 goda, Moscow, 1925.
- Imperatory, 1928, 366p.
  - Reprint edition: Imperatory Rossii: psikhologicheskie portrety, Moscow, Slovo, ISBN 5-85050-657-8, 377p.
  - French translation: Les derniers tsars autocrates: Paul Ier, Alexandre Ier, Nicolas Ier, Alexandre II, Alexandre III, Paris, Payot, 1928, 376p.
- Posledniya lyubov' Tyutcheva (E.A. Denis'eva) (Tyutchev's Last Love (E.A. Denis'eva)), 1928, 133p.
- Letopis' zhizni i tvorchestwa F.I. Tyutcheva, Moscow, 1933.
- Don Kihot (Don Quixote), 1935, 109p.
- Zhizn' Pushkina (Life of Pushkin), Moscow, Khudozhestvennaya literatura, 1938.
  - Reprint edition: Zhizn' Pushkina, Moscow, Nash dom—L’Age d’Homme, 1999, ISBN 5-89136-021-7, 364p.
- Kak rabotal Dostoevsky (How Dostoyevsky Worked), Moscow, Sovetsky Pisatel, 1939, 335p.
- Tiutcheviana : epigrammy, aforizmy i ostroty F.I. Tiutcheva, Oxford, Willem A. Meeuws, 1976, ISBN 0-902672-21-5

=== Autobiography ===
- Gody stranstvij (Годы странствий, Years of Wanderings), 1930, 397p.
  - Reprint edition, Chulkov's stories added: Moscow, Ellis Lak, 1999, ISBN 5-88889-035-9, 861p.
