= Pavel Sakulin =

Russian philologist (1863–1930)

- Павел Сакулин
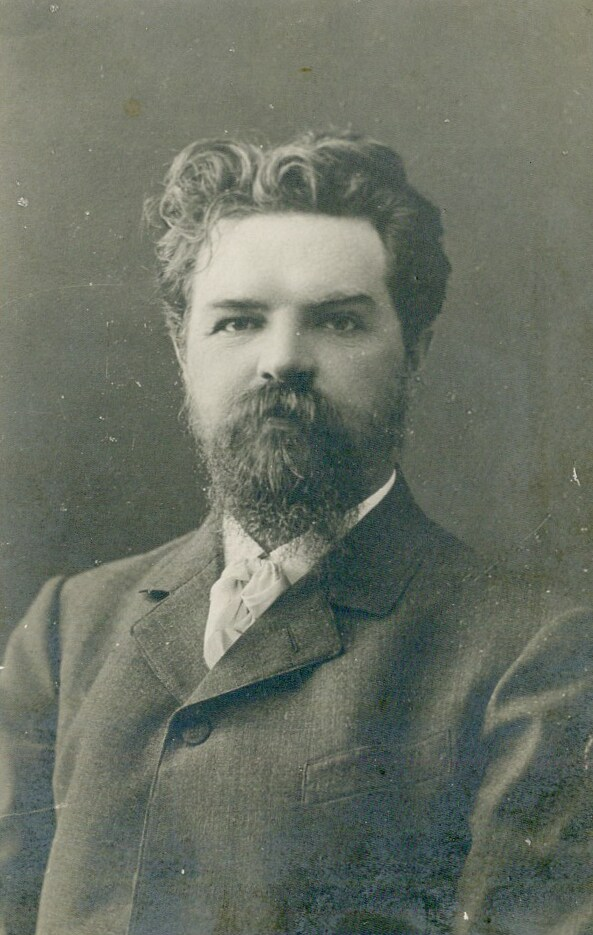
- Nikitich, c. 1905
- Born: 13 November 1863; Voskresenskoye, Samara Governorate, Russian Empire
- Died: Leningrad, Soviet Union (now Saint Petersburg, Russia)

Academic work
- Institutions: Imperial Moscow University; Moscow University; Pushkin House

Pavel Nikitich Sakulin (Russian: Павел Никитич Сакулин; 13 November 1863 – 7 September 1930) was a Russian and Soviet philologist and literary scholar.

== Biography ==
Sakulin was born to the family of a wealthy Old Believer peasant family. After graduating from the Samara Gymnasium he entered the literary department of the historical and philological faculty of Imperial Moscow University. In 1890, he was arrested for participating in student unrest, but graduated from the university in 1891 with a first-class diploma. He began teaching Russian language and literature at various secondary educational institutions.

In 1902, after passing the master's exam, he was accepted as a private assistant professor at Moscow University. During these years he criticised Tsarist autocracy in academia. In February 1911, together with many other teachers, he left Moscow University in protest against the policies of the Minister of Education Lev Kasso.

Since 1917, he was a professor at Moscow University and at the same time he again taught at the Moscow Higher Women's Courses. In 1924, after leaving Moscow University (1st Moscow State University), he took up a professorship at the Literary and Linguistic Department of the Pedagogical Faculty of the 2nd Moscow State University. He worked part-time at the Research Institute of Linguistics and Literature (head of the literature section), at the People's Commissariat of Education, and also taught at the drama courses of the Maly Theater. Sakulin's methodological research during the 1920s aimed to combine his sociological approach with Marxist literary criticism.

In 1921 he was elected the last chairman of the Society of Lovers of Russian Literature. In 1929, Sakulin was elected an Academician of the Soviet Academy of Sciences and in the last year of his life served as the director of the Pushkin House.
