= Fyodor Gladkov =

Soviet and Russian writer (1883–1958)

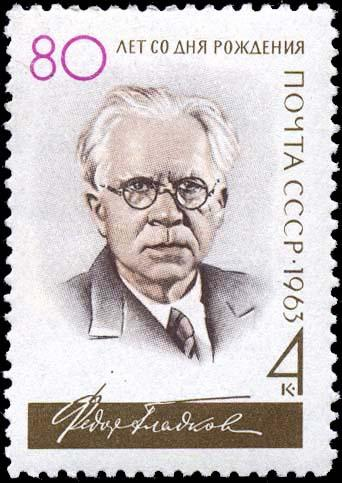
- Born: 21 June 1883; Bolshaya Chernavka, Petrovsky Uyezd, Saratov Governorate, Russian Empire
- Died: 20 December 1958 (aged 75); Moscow, Russian SFSR, Soviet Union
- Occupations: Writer, teacher
- Writing career
- Notable work: Cement
- Notable awards: Stalin Prize; 1949

Fyodor Vasilyevich Gladkov (Russian: Фёдор Васильевич Гладков; 21 June [O.S. 9 June] 1883 – 20 December 1958) was a Soviet and Russian socialist realist writer, best known for his 1925 novel Cement. Gladkov joined a Marxist group in 1904, and in 1905 went to Tiflis (now Tbilisi) and was arrested there for revolutionary activities. He was sentenced to three years' exile. He then moved to Novorossiysk. Among other positions, he served as the editor of the newspaper Krasnoye Chernomorye, secretary of the journal Novy Mir, special correspondent for Izvestia, and director of the Maxim Gorky Literature Institute in Moscow from 1945 to 1948. He received the Stalin Prize (in 1949) for his literary accomplishments, and is considered a classic writer of Soviet Socialist Realist literature.

== Teacher, exile and revolutionary ==
Gladkov was born in 1883 in Bolshaya Chernavka, Saratov Governorate (present-day Penza Oblast) to a family of Old Believers. In 1904, Gladkov began propaganda work for the Social Revolutionary Party in Chita, Irkutsk, joining the teachers' institute of Tiflis in the following year. In 1906 he began propaganda work for the Russian Social Democratic Labour Party, and was exiled that November for four years to Manzurka village in Irkutsk province. After completing his exile, Gladkov returned to Novorossiisk and to the Kuban where he was appointed the head of a primary school in Pavlovskaya.

In the spring of 1918 he returned to Novorossiisk to reorganise schools after the revolution in October 1917, though was forced into hiding when the Whites (pro-monarchist forces) captured the village in August of that year. In 1920, by which time the Whites had been driven out, Gladkov was appointed as the head of education in the town. He would also serve in the Red Army, before being made editor of the newspaper Krasnoye chernomorye. In 1921 he moved to Moscow where he was appointed as the head of a factory school, then secretary of the journal Novy mir (New World). Gladkov was a member of The Smithy writers group, which was engaged in polemics with the Russian Association of Proletarian Writers (RAPP). While a proponent of portraying the revolution in literature, he was anxious about the tone in which groups such as RAPP and MAPP (Moscow Association of Proletarian Writers) conducted their discussions, and the "working over" that non-RAPP writers were given in particular journals. In 1921 "as an intellectual and a Menshevik" he was expelled from the Communist Party but was then reinstated after the publication of Cement.

In 1941 he became a special correspondent for the newspaper Izvestia and Pravda, reporting from Sverdlovsk, specialising in war-time industrial topics. After the war, he was director of the Gorky Literary Institute in Moscow. He died in Moscow in 1958 and was buried at the Novodevichy Cemetery.

== Cement (1925) ==
Gladkov's Cement was published in a multitude of editions, including this 1928 Finnish translation from Astoria, Oregon, USA.

Gladkov's first major novel after the revolution, titled Cement, became a literary standard for socialist realist writing during the 1930s; in various speeches to the Writers' Congress in the USSR, Gladkov's contemporaries upheld Cement as one of the key exemplars that authors should emulate in Soviet literature.

Throughout his lifetime, Gladkov rewrote passages of Cement both to suit contemporary political concerns and to fit with the Socialist Realist aesthetic established in 1932.

== Published works ==
- Towards the Light (1900)
- After Work (1900)
- Maksuitka (1901)
- Before Hard Labour (1903)
- They Went Off To War (1904)
- The Inspection (1905)
- Three In One Hut (1905)
- The Outcasts (1908)
- The Abyss (aka The Only Son) (1917)
- Spring Shoots (1921)
- The Fiery Steed (1922)
- Cement (1925)
- The Old Secret Prison (1926)
- The Cephalopodous Man (1927)
- Energy (aka Power) (1932–1938)
- The Birch Grove (1941)
- The Scorched Soul (1943)
- The Vow (1944)
- Story of My Childhood (1949)
- The Outlaws (1950)
- Evil Days (1954)
- Restless Youth (unfinished)

== English translations ==
- Restless Youth, Foreign Languages Publishing House, 1959.
- Cement, Northwestern University Press, 1994.
