= Mikhail Gerasimov (poet) =

Russian poet

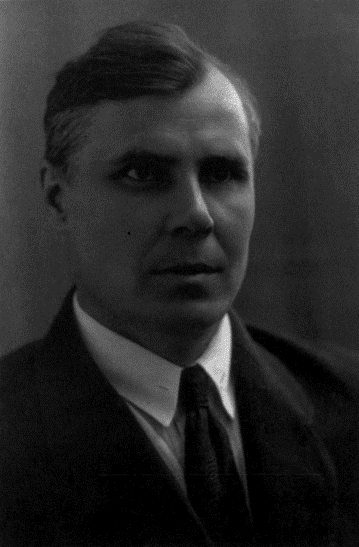
- Gerasimov in 1937
- Born: Mikhail Prokofyevich Gerasimov; 12 October 1889; Buguruslan, Russian Empire
- Died: 26 June 1939 (aged 49); Moscow, Russian SFSR, Soviet Union
- Occupation: Poet

Mikhail Prokofyevich Gerasimov (Russian: Михаи́л Проко́фьевич Гера́симов, IPA: [mʲɪxɐˈil prɐˈkofʲjɪvʲɪdʑ ɡʲɪˈrasʲɪməf]; 12 October 1889 – 26 June 1939) was one of the most widely read working-class poets in early-twentieth-century Russia. Initially embracing the Bolshevik Revolution as a liberating event and participating in the effort to create a new proletarian culture, following the New Economic Policy he became disillusioned and was imprisoned during the Joseph Stalin era.

== Early life ==
Mikhail Gerasimov was born on 30 September (12 October O.S.) 1889 in the village of Petrovka, near the town of Buguruslan, in Samara province in the Volga region of Russia. His father was a railway worker and crossing guard. His mother was of peasant origin. Starting at the age of nine, Gerasimov began helping out around the railroad, pulling weeds near the tracks. In the winter months he attended a two-class school in the town of Kinel'. After finishing school (in four or five years) he attended, while working in a variety of railroad jobs, the Samara railway technical school, allowing him to become a railway technician after graduation.

== Revolution and exile ==
During the 1905 Revolution, when Gerasimov was sixteen and working on the railroad, he got involved in an armed revolutionary detachment (druzhina) of railway workers, and became increasingly involved with the socialist underground. In 1906, he was arrested and imprisoned, but after six months escaped through a tunnel leading to a secret Russian Social Democratic Labour Party apartment. From there he was smuggled out of the country in the fall of 1907 by way of Finland (where he briefly met Lenin and other leading Social Democratic émigrés). For the next eight years, he lived mainly in France and Belgium, where he worked variously as a loader for blast furnaces in an arms factory in Nancy, France, as a hauler and coal-hewer in mines in Belgium, as a metal fitter and electrical fitter in French locomotive and car factories (including Renault), as a stoker and coalman on ocean liners, and in a variety of jobs in a number of other factories. In these years in exile and labor, Gerasimov managed to explore much of Western Europe (especially France, Belgium, Italy and the Alps), often working in winter and wandering by foot in summer—for which he was several times arrested for vagrancy.

== Literary career ==
He began to write sometime before 1913. That was the year he joined Anatoly Lunacharsky's Circle of Proletarian Culture in Paris, where he met other Russian émigré worker writers including Fedor Kalinin, Alexei Gastev, and Pavel Bessalko. He also began a correspondence with Maxim Gorky at this time, sending Gorky poems for comments. Gerasimov's first poems were published in 1913 in the Bolshevik magazine Prosveshchenie (Enlightenment). Other poems appeared in print in 1914 in the party newspaper Pravda, in Ilya Ehrenburg's émigré magazine Vechera (Evenings), and in other publications.

== Military experiences ==
When the First World War broke out in 1914, Gerasimov volunteered to fight against the Germans in the French Foreign Legion. He saw combat at the Marne, Champagne, and the Argonne, and was wounded several times but returned to battle. In the fall of 1915, for participating in anti-war agitation and for insubordination (he joined an uprising of Russian soldiers against harsh treatment by French officers), Gerasimov was deported to Russia. Returning to Samara he was placed under the surveillance of the military authorities and the following spring was arrested and assigned under guard to a reserve military engineering battalion. Amnestied as a result of the February revolution, Gerasimov became a member of the Samara Soviet of Soldiers’ Deputies, and was elected chair. In June 1917, he was a delegate at the First All-Russian Congress of Soviets and was chosen a member of the new national Central Executive Committee (VTsIK) (see Soviet). In July, he joined the Bolshevik Party, and in October 1917 was a delegate to the Second Congress of Soviets (which endorsed Soviet power). Returning to Samara, he became assistant chair of the Executive Committee of the Samara Provincial Soviet (Gubispolkom) and was named a military commissar. During the civil war he organized Red Guard detachments and commanded a unit on the Orenburg front.

== From Proletkult to Kuznitsa ==
While continuing to write and publish a large number of poems (in a wide-variety of newspapers, magazines, and collections) during the years from 1918 to the mid-1930s, Gerasimov also became one of the leaders of the proletarian culture movement (Proletkult). In 1918, he organized and was chair of the Samara Proletkult and in 1919 edited the Samara Proletkult magazine Zarevo zavodov (Glow of the factories). Later that year he moved to Moscow, where he was named head of the literary department of the Moscow Proletkult and joined the staff of the literary department of the Anatoly Lunacharsky's People's Commissariat of Enlightenment (LITO Narkomprosa). In February 1920, he formed a group of worker writers discontented with the Proletcult, feeling it inhibited their creative growth due to lack of attention to formal training and the special demands of the talented. Whilst still linked to Narkompros, he played a central role in organizing and then leading the Kuznitsa (Smithy) group. Many talented authors, such as Kirillov and Samobytnik-Mashirov, joined the Smithy. However they did not break their ties to the Proletkult. Eventually the new organisation agreed not to attempt to rival or eclipse the Proletkult; instead they devoted themselves principally to professional issues, such as payment scales. Gerasimov helped plan the First Congress of Proletarian Writers, and was elected (along with Il'ia Sadof'ev) assistant chair of the congress and of the resulting All-Russian Association of Proletarian Writers (VAPP). In 1921, in response to the New Economic Policy (NEP), which he viewed as signaling the end of the revolution, Gerasimov quit the Bolshevik party.

== Later life and death ==
In the mid-1920s, he became less involved in cultural organizations as well, but continued to publish—though these writings, according to Soviet critics, "diverged from the path of proletarian poetry." In 1937, he was arrested and according to some sources he was among Stalin's shooting lists and was executed by firing squad on 16 July 1937, however the official certificate of his death after his rehabilitation claims that Gerasimov passed in 1939 while being held in custody.

== Sources ==
- RGALI (Russian State Archive of Literature and Art, Moscow), f. 1374, op. 7, d. 13, l. 1-22
- Kratkaia Literaturnaia Entsiklopediia, 2:129-30
- V. L’vov-Rogachevskii, Noveishaia russkaia literatura, 350-66
- Literaturnaia Entsiklopediia, 2:468-71
- Russkie pisateli, 1800-1917, 1:540-41
- Russkie pisateli: Poety, 5:388-419
- Mark D. Steinberg, Proletarian Imagination: Self Modernity and the Sacred in Russia, 1910-1925 (Cornell University Press, 2002)
