= Sergey Zalygin =

Soviet writer and environmentalist (1913–2000)

Sergey Pavlovich Zalygin
- Сергей Павлович Залыгин
- Born: December 6, 1913; Durasovka, Ufa Governorate, Russian Empire
- Died: April 19, 2000 (aged 86); Moscow, Russia
- Education: Barnaul Agricultural College, Omsk State Agrarian Institute
- Occupations: Writer, editor

Sergey Pavlovich Zalygin (Russian: Серге́й Па́влович Залы́гин; December 6, 1913 – April 19, 2000) was a Soviet writer and environmentalist, the first non-Communist Party editor-in-chief of the monthly literary magazine Novy Mir (1986–1998).

== Life and literary work ==
He was born on December 6, 1913, in Durasovka village (now Sukharevka). His father, Pavel Ivanovich Zalygin, came from a peasant family of the Tambov Province, studied at the University of Kiev, from which he was expelled and exiled to the Ufa Province for revolutionary activity. Zalygin's mother, Lyubov Timofeevna Zalygina (Abkin), was a daughter of a bank employee from the town of Krasny Kholm, Tver Province. She studied at the Women's Higher Courses in Saint Petersburg.

His childhood was spent in the Ural mountains, at the Satka factory. In 1920, the family moved to Barnaul (in Western Siberia), where he graduated from a seven-year school, and, later, the Barnaul Agricultural College. He worked as an agronomist in the Tashtypsky district farm union of Khakassia in 1931, where he witnessed the tragic events of collectivization. In 1933–1939, Zalygin studied at the Omsk State Agrarian Institute at the Department of Irrigation and Reclamation. While a student he was influenced by the works of Russian geographer and meteorologist A. I. Voeykov and V. I. Vernadsky. During World War II, he worked as an engineer-hydrologist at the Salekhard Hydrometeorological Station in the Siberian Military District. After his demobilization, Zalygin returned to the Department of Irrigation and Reclamation at the Omsk Agrarian Institute, where in 1948 he defended his thesis on irrigation systems designing and became department chair.

Zalygin began to write while being a school student. While studying at the Omsk State Agrarian Institute, he worked as a reporter for a local newspaper. He began to write prose fiction in the 1940s. His first book was published in 1941 (Short Stories, Omsk). In 1952, he was first published in the Novy Mir monthly (Vtoroye deistvie [The Second Act], 1952, No. 9), for which he later submitted a series of essays, Vesnoi nyneshnego goda (This Spring, 1954, No. 8) about the interference of authorities in the life of a peasant. This publication brought fame to Zalygin and drew him close to the magazine's editor-in-chief, A. Tvardovsky. From 1970, after the dispersal of the editorial office of Novy Mir and the resignation of Tvardovsky, and until 1986, Zalygin refused to be published in the magazine out of solidarity.

In 1955, Zalygin moved to Novosibirsk and was mainly occupied by his literary work, although not abandoning the science. In these years, Zalygin, along with short stories, produced works of larger forms – a satirical novel Svideteli (Witnesses, 1956) and Tropy Altaya (Paths in the Altai, 1962), in which he described his impressions of the biological expedition to the Altai mountains. His biographer Igor Dedkov wrote that Tropy Altaya was "an introduction to the philosophy...on which all the main books of Zalygin were built".

In 1964, Na Irtyshe (On the Irtysh) was published in Novy Mir. The novel describes the catastrophe of the peasant life at the turn of the 1930s, during the collectivization period. "For the first time in the Soviet censored press, the truth about collectivization was told, for the first time collectivization was shown not in the canonical Sholokhov interpretation, but as a tragedy of the Russian peasants, and even more – as a national catastrophe". Official critics accused Zalygin of distorting the "concrete historical truth" and of "ideological and artistic inability". The artistic significance of the novel was highly esteemed by the public. The poet Anatoly Naiman described his impressions upon reading On the Irtysh some thirty years after its publishing in these words: "The day when I read the novel was separated from the events, which I had perceived as a living tragedy from my youth, by more than seventy years....The tragedy did not disappear, did not weaken, it simply moved to the special area reserved for tragedies. I read On the Irtysh as if I were reading Sophocles or Aeschylus".

By the end of the 1960s, Zalygin moved to Moscow and switched exclusively to writing. In 1968–1972, he led a prose workshop at the Literary Institute of A. M. Gorky. In 1969, he became the secretary of the board of the Writers' Union of the RSFSR; in 1986–1990 he entered the secretariat of the Writers' Union of the USSR. He signed a letter written by a group of Soviet writers to the editorial of the Pravda newspaper on August 31, 1973, denunciating Aleksandr Solzhenitsyn and Andrei Sakharov; he was also one of the people who condemned the Metropol almanach in 1979. At the same time, Zalygin was never a member of the Communist Party, and, in 1986, became the first non-party affiliated editor-in-chief of a Soviet literary magazine.

In 1967, Solyonaya Pad’ (Salt Ravine), a novel about the events of the civil war in Siberia, based on various historical documents, which Zalygin collected for several years working in the archives, was published. In it, the image of a fanatic-communist is opposed by the main character – the peasant leader Meshcheryakov (his prototype was the partisan commander E. M. Mamontov). In 1973, two of Zalygin's more experimental works were published: the psychological novel Yuzhno-Amerikanski Variant (The South American Variant) and the science fiction novel Os’ka smeshnoy mal’chik (Oska, the Funny Boy). In the novel Komissiya (Commission, 1975) Zalygin once again describes the period of the civil war in Siberia. The following, most ambitious, novel, Posle buri (After the Storm, 2 vol., 1982–1985), is set in the 1920s. It involves not peasants, but the byvshiye ('used-to-be') – the intellectuals who were exiled or fled from the Soviet authorities to the Siberian hinterland. Dedkov described the originality of this novel as "not so much a reproduction of characters...but of various individual or group 'philosophies'. This is an attempt to recreate the 'ideological landscape' of the Soviet Russia of the twenties, an attempt to understand the life of human thought during this period". Posle buri became Zalygin's last major work based on historical events. In the 1980s and 1990s, he wrote short stories about modern life. His writings of the 1990s are characterized, generally, by a more free form, they represent a combination of fiction and journalism.

Zalygin also wrote literary-critical works. The most significant of these are about A. P. Chekhov (Moi poet (My Poet), 1969) and Andrei Platonov (Skazki realista i realism skazochnika (Tales of a Realist and Realism of a Storyteller), 1970).

In 1986, Zalygin became editor-in-chief of the Novy Mir monthly, which, under him, began to play an important role in Mikhail Gorbachev’s politics of glasnost’. In the first issue of Novy Mir of 1987, Platonov's The Foundation Pit and Daniil Granin’s Bison were published. Doctor Zhivago by Boris Pasternak (prepared and commented by V. Borisov and E. Pasternak), 1984 by George Orwell, The Gulag Archipelago, as well as other works of Alexander Solzhenitsyn were published in the pages of Novy Mir for the first time in the USSR. The Humble Cemetery and Stroybat by Sergei Kaledin, Odlyan, or the Air of Freedom by Leonid Gabyshev, the journalistic pieces on the Chernobyl catastrophe by G. U. Medvedev, Advances and Debts by the economist N. P. Shmelev were also published there. During the years of perestroika, the struggle between Novy Mir and the censorship authorities did not go well for the monthly. Some parts of this struggle are described by Solzhenitsyn (A grain between two millstones, part 4, Novy Mir, 2003, No. 11) and Zalygin himself (Notes that do not need a plot, Oktyabr, 2003, No. 9-11). In 1991, the circulation of Novy Mir reached 2,700,000.

Over his years of working for Novy Mir, Zalygin gained a reputation of a decisive and principled person. At the same time, being the head of a prestigious monthly that stood by its "non-partisan" position (politically and aesthetically), he could refuse to publish even renowned authors, causing their resentment (such was the case with the famous Russian writer and former Soviet dissident Vladimir Voinovich, who later called Zalygin a "conformist" for it).

In 1989–1991 Zalygin was People's Deputy of the USSR and a member of the Presidential Council under M.S. Gorbachev.

In 1991, he became academician of the Russian Academy of Sciences (Section of Language and Literature).

He died on April 19, 2000. He was buried in Moscow at the Troyekurovskoye Cemetery.

== Awards ==
- USSR State Prize (1968)
- Hero of Socialist Labour together with the Order of Lenin (1988)
- Order of Friendship of Peoples (1993)
- Condé Nast Traveler Environmental Award (1991)
- Moscow City Hall Award in the field of literature and art (1999)
- Award of the President of the Russian Federation in the field of literature and art in 1999 (2000)

== Environmental activity ==
Though Zalygin quit hydrological engineering in the 1960s, he never ceased to follow attentively what was going on in the country in the sphere of hydro-amelioration and water management resources policies, and took part in public campaigns against ecologically dangerous hydraulic engineering projects which were being worked out by GOSPLAN (State Planning Committee) until the last years of the USSR.

His attitude towards state water management policies changed radically in 1961–1962, when the politically powerful Soviet hydropower agency Gidroproekt came out with the project of constructing a dam and a hydropower station in West Siberia, on the Lower Ob’. "I was shocked and stupefied, – wrote Zalygin later in his memoirs. – Back in my day I had worked in the region as hydroengineer, and I could clearly visualize the enormous devastation which a water reservoir of 132,000 square kilometers would have brought about". Zalygin became one of the prominent participants in the campaign against the Lower Ob’ Dam project. He went to various cities to discuss the matter with specialists – engineers, geologists, scientists. A key turning point in the debate came with the news of massive oil discoveries in the Lower Ob’ basin, but even after that the entrenched hydropower lobby would not yield up easily. Zalygin's articles elucidating the situation were published in one of the leading Soviet newspapers and drew public attention to the problem, converting the opinion of the administration managers. The fight ended in 1963, when a government decree ruled in favor of oil and gas over hydropower as the main priority in West Siberia.

In 1985–1986 Zalygin became one of the organizers of a public campaign against another ambitious project, the Siberian river reversal, aimed at diverting the flow of the Northern (Siberian) rivers southwards, toward the arid agricultural areas of Central Asia. The campaign was successful, and Zalygin regarded it as an evidence of new possibilities for democratic interference in the ecological policies of the state, unheard-of in the Soviet years. Full of enthusiasm, he became the leader of the public association Environment and the World in 1989, and in 1993 joined the ecological party Cedar. But soon his optimism about the ecological policies of the state and public role in decision-taking of the Perestroyka years gave way to disillusionment and dismay. In 1995 he quit the Green party due to discrepancies with its leaders. Yet the problem of relations between man and nature never ceased to worry him; it was central to all his writings of the 90s.

He was briefly member of the ecologist Kedr party in the mid-1990s.

== Published works ==
- Na Irtyshe [On the Irtysh] (1964)
- Solyonaya pad [Salt Valley] (1968)
- Iuzhno-Amerikansky Variant [South American Variant] (1973)
- Komissiya [Commission] (1975) – Sequel to Salt Valley
- Posle buri [After the Storm] (1985)

S. Zalygin's works have been translated into English, French, German, Armenian, Belarusian, Bulgarian, Bosnian, Chinese, Czech, Estonian, Finnish, Hungarian, Georgian, Japanese, Kyrgyz, Kazakh, Korean, Chinese, Latvian, Lithuanian, Mongolian, Polish, Romanian, Slovak, Swedish, Ukrainian, Vietnamese.

Most notable English translations:

- The South-American Variant, transl. Kevin Widle (St Lucia, Queensland: University of Queensland Press, 1979)
- The Commission. Transl. D. G. Wilson. Northern Illinois University Press, 1993

Most notable German translations:

- Am Irtysch. Übers. Elena Guttenberger. Frankfuhrt: Possev-Verlag, 1966
- Am Irtysch. Übers. Larissa Robiné. Berlin: Volk und Welt, 1975
- Republik Salzschlucht. Transl. Th. Reschke, J. Elperin, C. und G. Wojtek. Berlin, 1970
- Liebe ein Traum (Южно-американский вариант). Übers. Alexander Kaempfe. München, 1977
- Republik Salzschlucht. Transl. Th. Reschke, J. Elperin, C. und G. Wojtek. Berlin, 1970
- Die südamerikanische Variante. Übers. Lieselotte Remané. Berlin: Volk und Welt, 1980
- Festival (Erzählungen). Übers. Günter Löffler, Larissa Robiné. Leipzig: Philipp Reclam, 1983
