= Letter from a group of Soviet writers about Solzhenitsyn and Sakharov =

Letter from a group of Soviet writers about Solzhenitsyn and Sakharov (Russian: Письмо группы советских писателей о Солженицыне и Сахарове) was an open letter to the editor of the newspaper Pravda, the mouthpiece of the Communist Party of the Soviet Union, from a group of famous Soviet writers in connection with "anti-Soviet actions and speeches" of Aleksandr Solzhenitsyn and Andrei Sakharov. It was published in Pravda newspaper on August 31, 1973.

Dear Comrade Editor! Having read the letter published in your newspaper by members of the USSR Academy of Sciences regarding the behavior of Academician Sakharov, discrediting the honor and dignity of the Soviet scientist, we consider it our duty to express full agreement with the position of the authors of the letter...

— Soviet writers, "Letter from a group of Soviet writers about Solzhenitsyn and Sakharov", Pravda (31.08.1973)

The letter praised the Soviet Union's posture in the world and criticized the two dissidents as harming the Soviet Union's struggle in the Cold War.

== Signatories ==
1. Chinghiz Aitmatov
2. Yuri Bondarev
3. Vasil Bykaŭ
4. Rasul Gamzatov
5. Oles Honchar
6. Nikolai Gribachev
7. Sergey Zalygin
8. Valentin Kataev
9. Alim Keshokov
10. Vadim Kozhevnikov
11. Mikhail Lukonin
12. Georgi Markov
13. Ivan Melezh
14. Sergey Mikhalkov
15. Sergey Narovchatov
16. Vitaly Ozerov
17. Boris Polevoy
18. Afanasy Salynski
19. Sergey Sartakov
20. Konstantin Simonov
21. Sergey Smirnov
22. Anatoly Sofronov
23. Mykhailo Stelmakh
24. Alexey Surkov
25. Nikolai Tikhonov
26. Mirzo Tursunzoda
27. Konstantin Fedin
28. Nikolai Fedorenko
29. Aleksandr Chakovsky
30. Mikhail Sholokhov
31. Stepan Shchipachev

Vasil Bykaŭ, in his autobiography "The Long Road Home", published after the collapse of the USSR, claims that he did not consent to the appearance of his signature on the letter, but on the day of signing the letter was read in the Vremya program, where Bykov was named among the signatories. Vasil Bykaŭ's disagreement with signing the letter published in Pravda is also evidenced by the writer Igor Zolotussky in a documentary about Bykov.

Mikhail Lukonin’s son, in his memoirs about his father, also disputes his father's voluntary participation in this signing.
