= Literary magazine =

Periodical devoted to literature

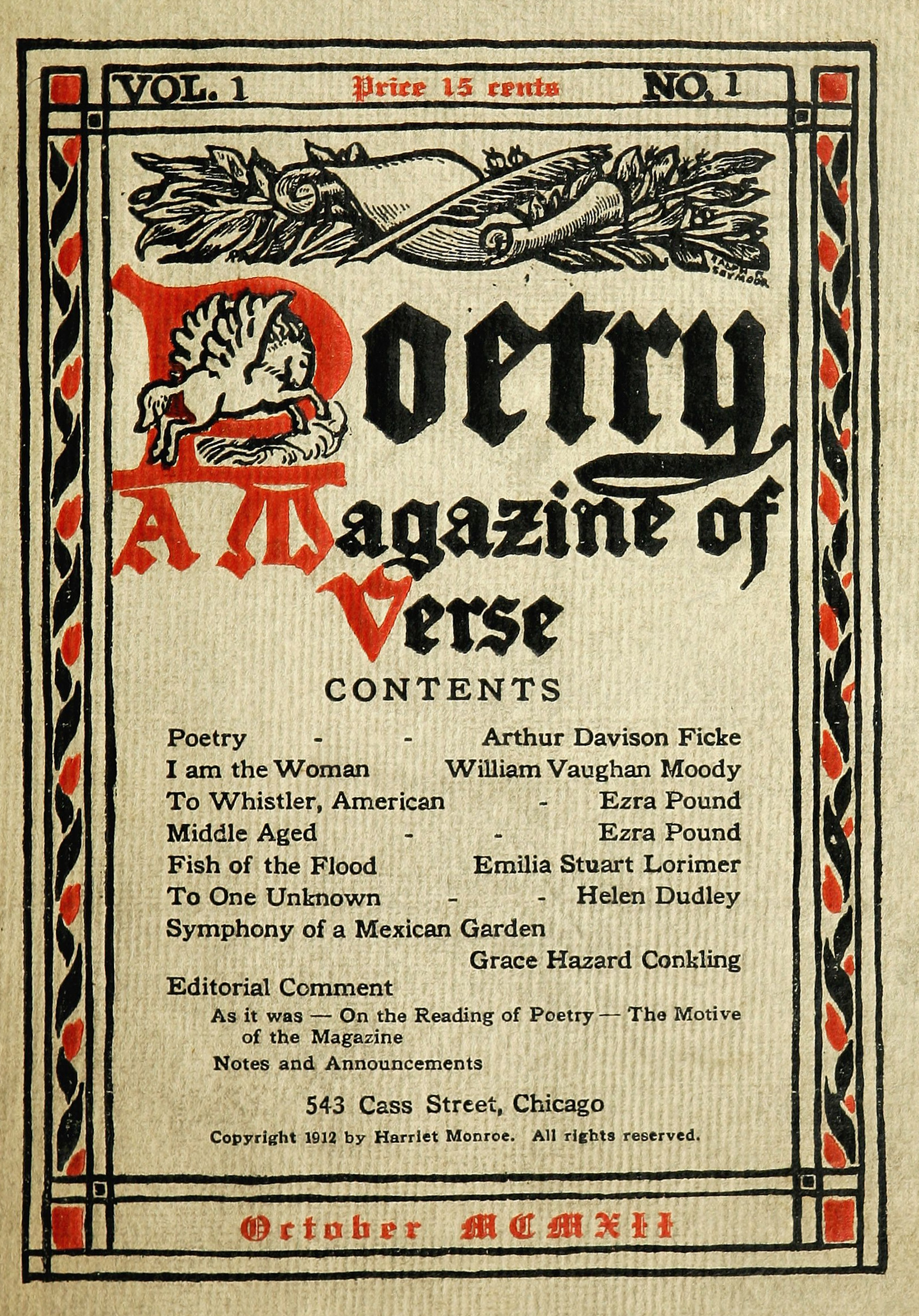
The cover of the first issue of Poetry magazine, published in 1912.

A literary magazine or literary journal is a periodical devoted to literature in a broad sense. Literary magazines usually publish a mix of fiction and non-fiction. Short stories and poetry are common literary forms published, but some magazines may publish serial literature—a novel which is revealed in sections over multiple issues. Non-fiction writing may be from staff of the literary magazine to make commentary about their magazine or about culture related to literature. Non-fiction from contributors may take the form of essays, literary criticism, book reviews, biographical profiles of authors, interviews, and letters.

== History ==
Nouvelles de la république des lettres is regarded as the first literary magazine; it was established by Pierre Bayle in France in 1684. Literary magazines became common in the early part of the 19th century, mirroring an overall rise in the number of books, magazines, and scholarly journals being published at that time. In Great Britain, critics Francis Jeffrey, Henry Brougham and Sydney Smith founded the Edinburgh Review in 1802. Other British reviews of this period included the Westminster Review (1824), The Spectator (1828), and Athenaeum (1828). In the United States, early journals included the Philadelphia Literary Magazine (1803–1808), the Monthly Anthology (1803–11), which became the North American Review, the Yale Review (founded in 1819), The Yankee (1828–1829) The Knickerbocker (1833–1865), Dial (1840–44) and the New Orleans–based De Bow's Review (1846–80). Several prominent literary magazines were published in Charleston, South Carolina, including The Southern Review (1828–32) and Russell's Magazine (1857–60). The most prominent Canadian literary magazine of the 19th century was the Montreal-based Literary Garland.

The North American Review, founded in 1815, is the oldest American literary magazine. However, it had its publication suspended during World War II, and the Yale Review (founded in 1819) did not; thus the Yale journal is the oldest literary magazine in continuous publication. Begun in 1889, Poet Lore is considered the oldest journal dedicated to poetry. By the end of the century, literary magazines had become an important feature of intellectual life in many parts of the world. One of the most notable 19th century literary magazines of the Arabic-speaking world was Al-Urwah al-Wuthqa.

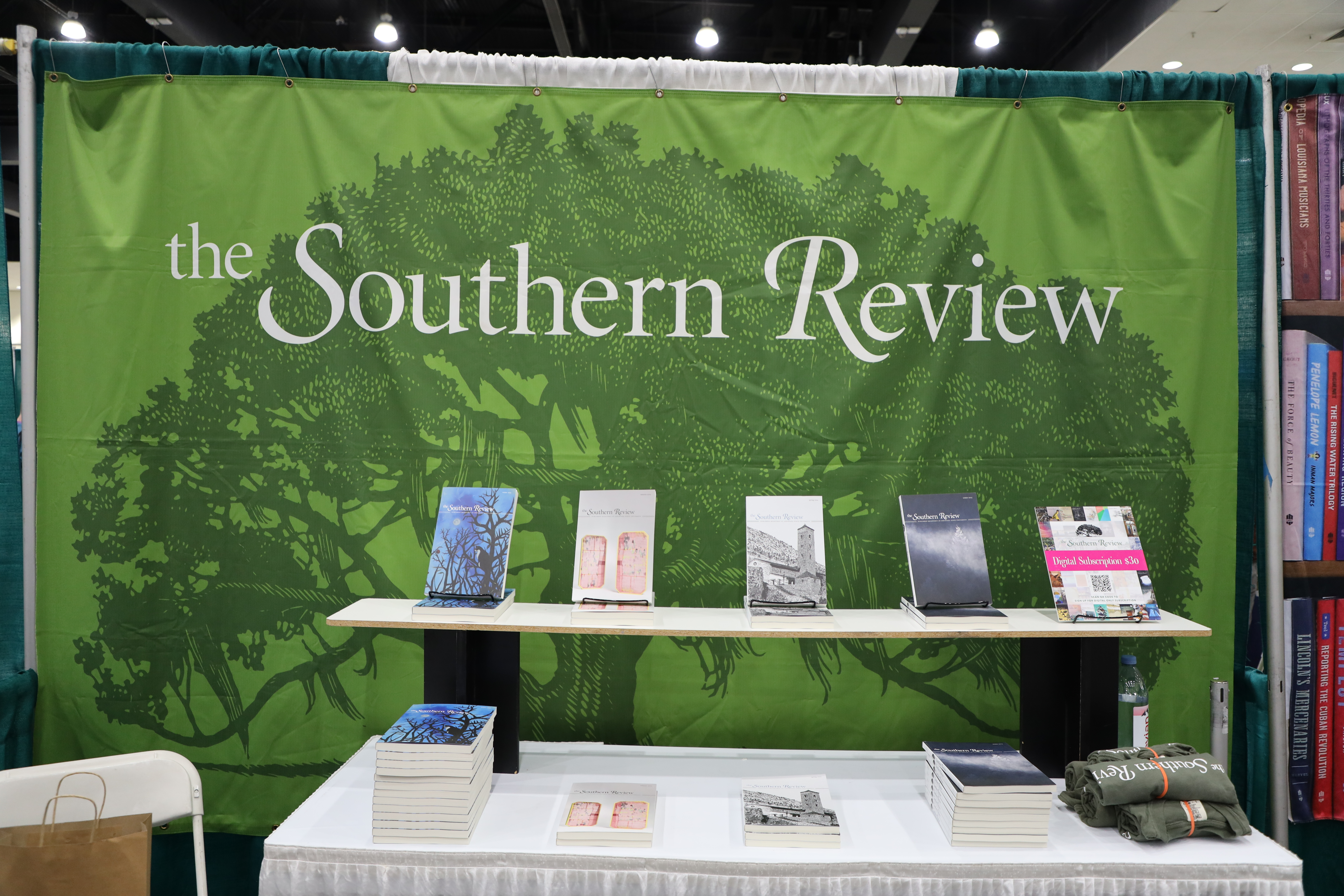
The Southern Review at the AWP Conference & Bookfair 2025 in Los Angeles, CA

Among the literary magazines that began in the early part of the 20th century is Poetry magazine. Founded in 1912, it published T. S. Eliot's first poem, "The Love Song of J. Alfred Prufrock". Another was The Bellman, which began publishing in 1906 and ended in 1919, was edited by William Crowell Edgar and was based in Minneapolis, Minnesota. Other important early-20th century literary magazines include The Times Literary Supplement (1902), Southwest Review (1915), Virginia Quarterly Review (1925), World Literature Today (founded in 1927 as Books Abroad before assuming its present name in 1977), Southern Review (1935), and New Letters (1935). The Sewanee Review, although founded in 1892, achieved prominence largely thanks to Allen Tate, who became editor in 1944.

Two of the most influential—though radically different—journals of the last half of the 20th century were The Kenyon Review (KR) and the Partisan Review. The Kenyon Review, edited by John Crowe Ransom, espoused the so-called New Criticism. Its platform was avowedly unpolitical. Although Ransom came from the South and published authors from that region, KR also published many New York–based and international authors. The Partisan Review was first associated with the American Communist Party and the John Reed Club; however, it soon broke ranks with the party. Nevertheless, politics remained central to its character, while it also published significant literature and criticism.

The middle-20th century saw a boom in the number of literary magazines, which corresponded with the rise of the small press. Among the important journals which began in this period were Nimbus: A Magazine of Literature, the Arts, and New Ideas, which began publication in 1951 in England, the Paris Review, which was founded in 1953, The Massachusetts Review and Poetry Northwest, which were founded in 1959, X Magazine, which ran from 1959 to 1962, and the Denver Quarterly, which began in 1965. The 1970s saw another surge in the number of literary magazines, with a number of distinguished journals getting their start during this decade, including Columbia: A Journal of Literature and Art, Ploughshares, The Iowa Review, Granta, Agni, The Missouri Review, and New England Review. Other highly regarded print magazines of recent years include The Threepenny Review, The Georgia Review, Ascent, Shenandoah, The Greensboro Review, ZYZZYVA, Glimmer Train, Tin House, Half Mystic Journal, the Canadian magazine Brick, the Australian magazine HEAT, and Zoetrope: All-Story. Some short fiction writers, such as Steve Almond, Jacob M. Appel and Stephen Dixon have built national reputations in the United States primarily through publication in literary magazines.

The Committee of Small Magazine Editors and Publishers (COSMEP) was founded by Richard Morris in 1968. It was an attempt to organize the energy of the small presses. Len Fulton, editor and founder of Dustbook Publishing, assembled and published the first real list of these small magazines and their editors in the mid-1970s. This made it possible for poets to pick and choose the publications most amenable to their work and the vitality of these independent publishers was recognized by the larger community, including the National Endowment for the Arts, which created a committee to distribute support money for this burgeoning group of publishers called the Coordinating Council of Literary Magazines (CCLM). This organisation evolved into the Council of Literary Magazines and Presses (CLMP).

Many prestigious awards exist for works published in literary magazines including the Pushcart Prize and the O. Henry Awards. Literary magazines also provide many of the pieces in The Best American Short Stories and The Best American Essays annual volumes.

== Argentine literary magazine tradition ==
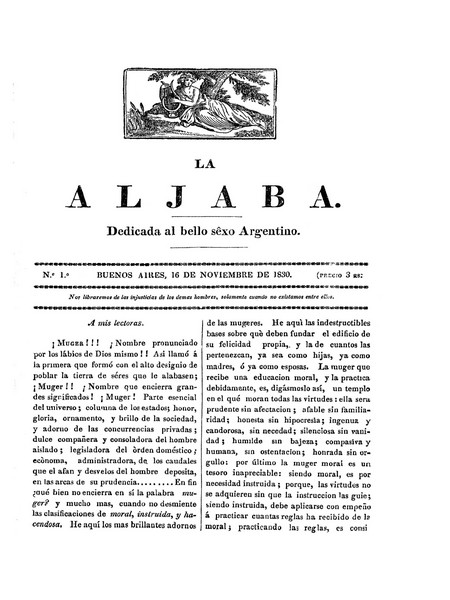
First edition of La Aljaba (1830), the first magazine by women and for women of Latin America, and one of the first ones in the world. Also, the first literary magazine of Argentina.

Throughout Argentine history, literary magazines have profoundly impacted the country's social and political discourse. The first literary magazine in Argentina was La Aljaba, founded in 1830. It was one of the first magazines in the world created by and for women. Juan Bautista Alberdi, the main thinker behind the Constitution of Argentina, founded a literary magazine in 1837 called La Moda, which published several members of the 1837 Generation (who were known for introducing new artistic tendencies from Europe, such as Romanticism and political liberalism).

In 1924, Modernist writers founded Martín Fierro, which published 45 issues over the following three years of its existence. Named after José Hernandez's epic poem, the magazine was integral to the development of the Argentine avant-garde and was greatly influenced by ultraism. Many important Argentine writers of the early 20th century published their writings in Martín Fierro, such as Oliverio Girondo, Victoria Ocampo, Ricardo Güiraldes, Leopoldo Marechal, and Jorge Luis Borges. In 1931, several former members of Martín Fierro's editorial staff founded Sur. The most prominent Argentine authors published their writings there, including Borges, Adolfo Bioy Casares, Ernesto Sábato, and distinguished writers from abroad, such as Gabriel García Márquez, Pablo Neruda and Octavio Paz. Sur shared many of the same artistic sensibilities as its predecessor, but it was more engaged politically, being strongly opposed to Peronism and Nazism. Many of the best stories by Borges, such as El Aleph, Tlön, Uqbar, Orbis Tertius and The Circular Ruins, were originally published in Sur.

In 1953, Ismael Viñas created Contorno, a disruptive magazine affiliated with communism and existentialism, in which writer David Viñas, sociologist Juan José Sebreli and philosopher León Rozitchner, among others, published their writings.

Martín Caparrós and Jorge Dorio founded Babel. Revista de Libros in 1988. The magazine sought to recover diverse literary voices and push experimental forms after the last Argentine dictatorship.

In the 21st century, while print magazines have declined in Argentina, some online literary magazines, such as Revista Ñ, have found success.

== "Thick journals" in the Russian-speaking world ==
Originating in the Russian Empire, a thick journal (Russian: толстый журнал, tolsty zhurnal) is a magazine format combining literary and journalistic work. The name comes from its size: a typical 19th-century issue of a thick journal was 300–400 pages long, and appeared quarterly or triannually (more rarely, bimonthly). Today they are usually over 200 pages long.

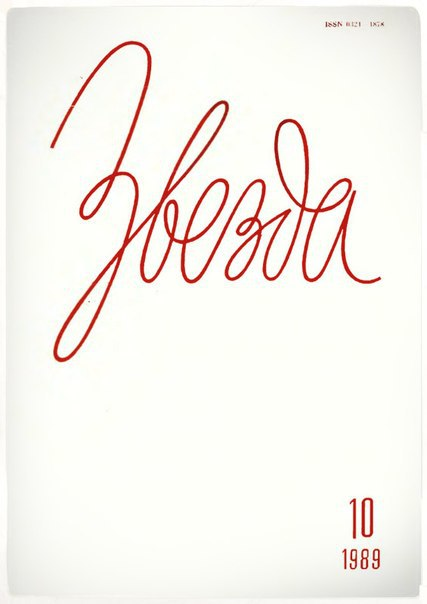
Cover of the October 1989 Issue of Zvezda (St. Petersburg, Russia)

In the nineteenth and early-twentieth centuries, more than half of each issue was devoted to literary works (including short stories, serialized novels, drama, poetry, and translations) and the remainder was devoted to journalism (including art criticism, literary criticism and music criticism; political, philosophical and socioreligious essays; and calendars of events). Literary reputations were fostered mainly through thick journals.

In the late Russian Empire they were a major vehicle of propagation of culture across the vast expanses of the country, as well as a major component of the cultural life of Russian emigres. Before the revolution, each thick journal represented one or another ideological position, including conservative, liberal and populist.

Notable examples of early thick journals include Vestnik Evropy, Moskovsiy Telegraf, Teleskop, Biblioteka Dlya Chteniya, Sovremennik, Otechestvennye Zapiski, Mir Bozhiy, Zhizn, Obrazovanye, and Sovremennaya Zhizn.

=== Early origins ===
Thick journals were originally a phenomenon of the Western European Enlightenment, conceived as a means to circulate ideas to a small, educated public. In the nineteenth century, facing competition from magazines that offered entertainment and information to a wider audience, the influence of thick journals diminished.

=== Imperial Russia, 1755–1917 ===
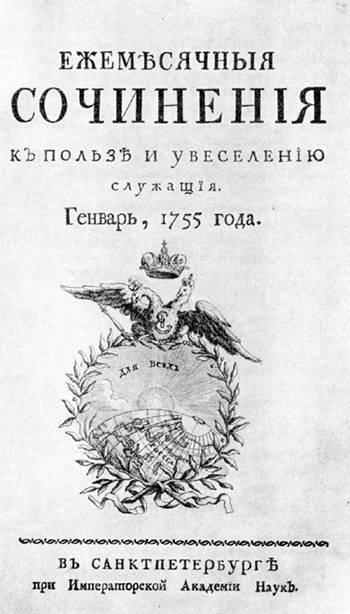
Title page of Imperial Russia's first thick journal, called Monthly Writings Serving Purpose and Enjoyment, January 1755.

The first independent Russian journal was called Monthly Writings Serving Purpose and Enjoyment (Ежемесячные сочинения, к пользе и увеселению служащие, 1755–1797), edited by Gerhard Friedrich Müller, of the St. Petersburg Academy of Sciences. Inspired by the principles of the European Enlightenment, it was followed by an ever-increasing number of similar undertakings on different subjects, including literature.

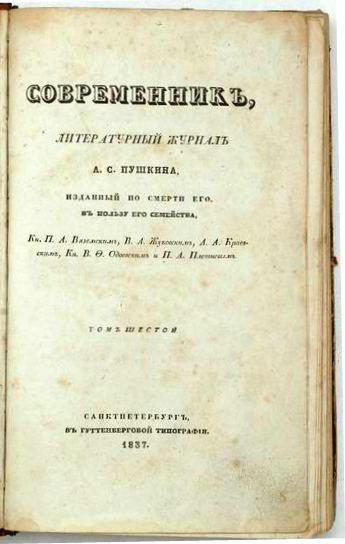
Title page of Sovremennik from 1837, printed after the death of Alexander Pushkin (journal from 1836-1866)

Many famous authors founded their own thick journals. Aleksandr Pushkin launched Sovremennik (the Contemporary), which became a famous liberal vehicle that ran for 30 years, from 1836-1866. Nikolai Karamzin created Moskovskii Zhurnal (Moscow Journal; 1791–1792), and Dostoevsky launched two different journals, called Epoch and Vremya.

A number of other journals were launched after the 1861 reforms of Alexander II, which lessened censorship in the Russian Empire. Some of the most influential thick journals of the time were the Russian Messenger, in which Ivan Turgenev, Leo Tolstoy, and Fyodor Dostoyevsky published major works, and Russian Mind (1880–1927), to which Vladimir Korolenko, Nikolai Leskov, and Anton Chekhov contributed.

=== Soviet Russia, 1917–1989 ===
Towards the end of the Imperial Period, thick journals diminished in popularity, mirroring developments in Western Europe. They were, however, given new life by the Bolsheviks, who had taken control of the press and needed an authoritative new forum. Many important publications were launched in the 20s and 30s, including Novy Mir (1925-), Oktyabr (1925-), Znamya (1931-), all based in Moscow; Zvezda (1924-), based in Leningrad; Sibirskie ogni (1922-), based in Novosibirsk; Don (1925-), based in Rostov-on-Don; and Zvezda Vostoka (1932-), based in Tashkent. Thick journals were trend-setters and cultural icons that could start literary careers and end them. In 1948, a campaign of Zhdanovism was directed against the thick journals Zvezda and Leningrad, for having published works by Anna Akhmatova and Mikhail Zoshchenko. During the 50s and 60s, a few of these magazines had massive influence, publishing some of the most iconic books of the period. Novy Mir published Not by Bread Alone, by Vladimir Dudintsev, and One Day in the Life of Ivan Denisovich, by Aleksandr Solzhenitsyn. Its cultural influence was so massive that Historian Cecile Vaissie has claimed that without its Editor-in-Chief, Aleksandr Tvardovsky, the 60s would not have happened. Novy Mir became so associated with the liberal intelligentsia that it received hundreds of readers' letters, not only in response to its publication, but also on human rights matters such as when Boris Pasternak published Doctor Zhivago outside the USSR and was expelled from the country, and the Sinyavsky–Daniel trial.

Other classics of the period also came out in thick journals before appearing as books, such as Mikhail Bulgakov's The Master and Margarita, published by the journal Moskva.

=== Modern Russia ===
Thick journals exploded in popularity during Perestroika, with circulation of some journals reaching more than a million copies each month. However, thick journals have drastically declined in popularity since the dissolution of the Soviet Union.

== Online literary magazines ==
SwiftCurrent, created in 1984, was the first online literary magazine. It functioned as more of a database of literary works than a literary publication. In 1995, the Mississippi Review was the first large literary magazine to launch a fully online issue. By 1998, Fence. Around 1996, literary magazines began to appear more regularly online. At first, some writers and readers dismissed online literary magazines as not equal in quality or prestige to their print counterparts, while others said that these were not properly magazines and were instead ezines. Since then, though, many writers and readers have accepted online literary magazines as another step in the evolution of independent literary journals.

There are other online literary publications and it is difficult to judge the quality and impact of this mostly new publishing medium.

== Little magazines ==
Little magazines, or "small magazines", are literary magazines that often publish experimental literature and the non-conformist writings of relatively unknown writers. Typically they had small readership, were financially uncertain or non-commercial, were irregularly published and showcased artistic innovation.

== See also ==
- List of literary magazines
- Literary fiction
- Creative nonfiction
- Anthology
