= Fedulov =

Fedulov (Russian: Федулов) is a Russian masculine surname, its feminine counterpart is Fedulova. Notable people with the surname include:

- Alevtina Fedulova (1940–2026), Russian politician
- Igor Fedulov (born 1966), Russian ice hockey player
- Ivan Gronsky (1894–1985), born Fedulov
- Nikolay Fedulov (born 1946), Soviet sprint canoer
