= To Make My Bread =

Book by Grace Lumpkin

To Make My Bread is a novel written by Grace Lumpkin about the Loray Mill strike. It was published in 1932. Lumpkin chronicles the McClures, a family of poor Appalachian tenant farmers, during the industrialization of the south. Released in the heart of the Great Depression, the story takes the McClures to the mill town of Leesville, North Carolina, after their land was taken by a logging corporation. Soon after their optimistic arrival induced by economic conditions, they find the worst is yet to come as they endure a new, challenging life of being a part of the exploited working class under mill management. The book won the Maxim Gorky Prize for Literature that year, too. It was adapted by Albert Bein into the play Let Freedom Ring which was staged on Broadway in 1935.

== Plot summary ==
The novel begins in 1900 with the McClure family, which consists of Emma, the mother, her father Granpap, and Emma's children: Basil, Kirk, Bonnie, and John. They make their living in the Appalachian Mountains as farmers and bootleggers. The family is forced to live through a harsh winter with little food. It is apparent they must work hard for what they need. They are also poor, and must take credit at the general store to buy food.

As the family continues to barely subsist, the "outside" seems to be creeping closer to the isolated families of the Appalachian region. One day, a peddler from the outside comes to visits the McClures. He tells the family about a new mill in town where they are hiring many people. Granpap quickly dismisses him because he does not like the outsider.

The family struggles to make a living and challenging personal relationships often get in the way. Kirk is revealed to be a drunk and very poor at managing money. Kirk becomes involved with Minnie, and she is revealed to be pregnant, although it is unclear who the father is. Granpap is arrested for bootlegging and is sentenced to two years in jail. Basil decides to leave the family to gain an education.

Kirk is killed, and it appears that Sam McEachern is the one who shot him. Basil returns later asking for money for books at his school, and with the death of Kirk and Granpap in jail, money is very tight. Granpap decides that his family would move to Leesville to work in the mill to make more money.

When the families arrive at Leesville, they believe that working in the mill will provide them with more opportunities. Frank, Ora and Emma begin their jobs at the mill. In the fall, John and Bonnie start school. However, not long after that, Emma becomes ill and Bonnie and John are forced to begin working and leave school.

John begins a friendship with John Stevens, a veteran mill worker and union supporter. As Bonnie and John grow up, Bonnie marries Jim Calhoun. Emma's condition continues to worsen, and she dies. Later, Jim has and accident that precludes him from working, and he abandons his family. Granpap becomes ill and soon dies.

Working at the mill is hard on families. One day one of Bonnie's kids contracts pneumonia while she is at work and dies. Mary Allen, an African American worker, is sympathetic and sends her daughter to care for Bonnie's children.

John and Bonnie continue to work in the mill but they are unhappy with their situation. Workers' wages are cut and the number of positions reduced. As John has learned many things about unions he decides to unionize the workers and starts a strike. The workers picket outside the factory and are often jailed and beaten.

Bonnie is also involved in the unionization of workers. Because of her relationship with Mary Allen, Bonnie helps to make the union integrated so African Americans do not scab. John and the other union leaders decide to hold a rally. During the rally Bonnie is shot and killed. In the aftermath, John Stevens tells John, "This is just the beginning."

== Characters ==
- Granpap: Civil War veteran and bootlegger. Goes to jail for two years for bootlegging. He is too old to be able to work in the mills.
- Emma: Does not like Granpap selling moonshine, but wants her family to have money. Decides to move the family out of the mountains to work at the mills.
- Kirk: Emma's son, is killed by Sam McEachern. Takes the side of Granpap for selling moonshine to make money.
- Basil: Leaves the family to go school and does not have to work in the mills. Wants to distance himself from his mountain family.
- Sam: Part of the McEachern family, who are bootleggers. Ends up shooting Kirk and killing him.
- Bonnie: Becomes the female breadwinner for her family. Experiences many torments experiencing while working in the mills and feels the weight of supporting the family.
- John: Like Bonnie, he also becomes a major contributor for the family. Young and strong, John becomes the man of the family.

== Analysis ==
Inspired by her own experience in Gastonia, North Carolina, during the textile strike, Lumpkin's writing style in the radical literary tradition is explored in several political themes encompassing the exhausting pursuit of unionization. The McClure family represents the struggle between the familial and the communal as they move to the mill town to make a better life for themselves. In doing so, they go from an agrarian lifestyle to urban where everyone in the family must pull their weight to barely make a living. The exploitation of mill workers challenges the formerly matriarchal, agrarian family structure of the McClures as they endure a starving winter, an arrest and murder, All the while, mothers and children are employed in long hours of harsh working conditions.

Lumpkin's central theme conveyed through the quest for unionized life is the plight of working-class women during the Great Depression. Emma and Bonnie take on roles of motherhood and workers who struggled severely in dividing their duties. There is no joy in having children at this time, and reproductive obligations leave the mothers with no choice but to solely provide, as their productive capacities place them in a limited socioeconomic role.

Lumpkin's progressive voice is explored most through Bonnie, who represents solidarity against mill management, while inspiring others through nobility and perseverance. When Bonnie joins the strike, she exposes the importance of the woman's role and takes a radical step towards her goal of unifying the working class, regardless of ethnic background or race, as demonstrated by her organization of African American workers. Bonnie's efforts cemented her legacy after her tragic death. Her attempts to blend class separation and to expose the working woman emulates Lumpkin's political themes, portrayed throughout the defeating journey of the McClure's search for security.

== Awards ==
The book won the Maxim Gorky Prize for Literature from Moscow in 1932:

Art, in Grace Lumpkin's case, took the form of a novel on which she had been working for some time, and which eventually appeared as To Make My Bread. It was awarded Moscow's Maxim Gorki prize for literature, was turned into a play and, some years later, had a successful run at the Civic Repertory's old theater on 14th Street.

== See also ==
- Not by Bread Alone by Vladimir Dudintsev (1956)
