= Let Freedom Ring (play) =

Let Freedom Ring is a play by Albert Bein adapted from Grace Lumpkin's 1932 novel To Make My Bread. It premiere on Broadway at the Broadhurst Theatre on November 6, 1935. It was staged by Worthington Miner and co-produced by Bein and Jack Goldsmith. The play's plot revolves around a labor crises at a cotton mill in the American South. The Broadway cast included Robert B. Williams as Kirk McClure, Paula Bauersmith as Emma Martin, Will Geer as John Kirkland, Edwin Cooper as Paul Randolph, Sheppard Strudwick as John McClure, Charles Dingle as Sheriff Cole, Tom Ewell as both Small Hardy and Young Frank Martin, Norma Chambers as Ora McClure, and Isabel Bonner as Bessie among others.
