= Aleksandr Chakovsky =

Soviet editor

- Александр Борисович Чаковский
- Born: 13 August [O.S. 31 July] 1913; Saint Petersburg, Russian Empire
- Died: 17 February 1994 (aged 80); Moscow, Soviet Union
- Education: Maxim Gorky Literature Institute
- Writing career
- Genres: Poetry, Prose
- Notable awards: Lenin Prize, USSR State Prize, Stalin Prize of third degree, Vasilyev Brothers State Prize of the RSFSR, Hero of Socialist Labour, Order of Lenin, Order of the October Revolution, Order of the Patriotic War, Order of the Red Banner of Labour, Order of the Red Star, Medal "For the Defence of Leningrad", Medal "For the Victory over Germany in the Great Patriotic War 1941–1945"
- Movement: Socialist realism

Aleksandr Borisovich Chakovsky (Russian: Александр Борисович Чаковский; August 26, 1913 – February 17, 1994) was a Soviet/Russian editor and novelist; editor-in-chief of "Literaturnaya Gazeta" from 1962 to 1988. A hard-line Communist, he served as an unofficial cultural arbiter through his position in the powerful Writers' Union.

== Biography ==
Born on August 13 (26), 1913 in St. Petersburg, into a wealthy Jewish family. His grandfather Matvey Abramovich Chakovsky was a merchant of the first guild and a large homeowner in Samara, his father Boris Matveevich Chakovsky was a venereologist, and his uncle Ilya Matveevich Chakovsky was a sworn attorney in Saint Petersburg. Chakovsky spent his childhood and adolescence in Samara: here he graduated from school in 1930, went to the village as a high school student to eliminate illiteracy, was an “assistant” of the collectivization commissioner and editor of a wall newspaper. At the age of 17, he went to Moscow to study at the evening department of the law institute.

In 1938 he graduated from the A. M. Gorky Literary Institute and attended graduate school at the Moscow Institute of Philosophy and Literature. During his studies, he worked in the literary and artistic "October" magazine. He made his debut as a critic in 1937, and later also published as a playwright. Since 1939 - candidate member of the CPSU (b), since 1941 - member of the CPSU (b). Member of the Writers' Union since 1941.

In 1941, he was the head of the script department of the Mosfilm film studio, and edited the first issues of the Combat Film Collection. Since January 1942, with the rank of major in the administrative service, he has been a correspondent for the Volkhov Front newspapers “Banner of Victory” and “Front-line Pravda”. He was demobilized in March 1945.

From 1955 to 1963 - the first editor-in-chief of the journal Foreign Literature. From 1962 to 1988, he was editor-in-chief of the Literary Newspaper, which at that time received the informal name "Hyde Park of Socialism" and reached the peak of its popularity. However, according to the memoirs of his deputy Vitaly Syrokomsky, the editor-in-chief "was absent from the editorial office for an average of seven months a year: three months - the prescribed leave of the secretary of the board of the Union of Writers of the USSR, another three months - sabbatical leave at his own expense, at least a month - deputy trips to voters in Mordovia and foreign business trips".

In 1973, he signed a letter from a group of Soviet writers about Aleksandr Solzhenitsyn and Andrei Sakharov, and wrote an article denouncing the dissidents Alexander Ginzburg, Yuri Galanskov, Alexey Dobrovolsky and Vera Lashkova.

== Honours and awards ==
- Stalin Prize third degree (1950) – for the novel "We already Morning" (1949)
- Lenin Prize (1978) – for the novel "The Siege"
- USSR State Prize (1983) – for the novel "Victory"
- Vasilyev Brothers State Prize of the RSFSR (1980) – a script for the film "Siege" (1973, 1977)
- Four Orders of Lenin
- Order of the October Revolution
- Order of the Red Banner of Labour
- Order of the Red Star
- Hero of Socialist Labour
