= The Luncheon on the Grass (film) =

- Written by: Mikhail Lvovsky
- Directed by: Nikolai Alexandrovich
- Starring: Sergey Prokhanov; Valentina Talyzina; Tatyana Lebedkova
- Music by: Vladimir Shainsky
- Country of origin: Soviet Union
- Original language: Russian

Production
- Cinematography: Vladimir Brusin
- Editors: G. Vladimirskaya; L. Panova; G. Shmovanova
- Running time: 135 minutes
- Production company: Studio Ekran

Original release
- Release: 1979

The Luncheon on the Grass (Russian: Завтрак на траве, romanized: Zavtrak na trave) is a 1979 Soviet children's two-part television film directed by Nikolai Alexandrovich based on the stories of Anatoly Chernousov.

The film is titled after the painting Le Déjeuner sur l’herbe / The Luncheon on the Grass by Claude Monet from the album of the Impressionists, presented to young cartoonist-surrealist Dima Murashkin by Pioneer leader Ivan Kovalyov.

== Plot ==
Graduate Ivan Nikolayevich Kovalev is preparing to enter the institute. His friend Sergei Pavlovich convinces Ivan to engage in this training in the pioneer camp as a pioneer leader, where there is plenty of free time and sun. Ivan agrees, but after a few days he regrets very much about his decision: the pioneers smoke constantly and ignore the daily schedule, and there is no peace and quiet for studying.

Only the experienced teacher, pioneer Alexander Petrovna, is capable of dealing with them. On top of that, a group of guys run from the camp to the forest, where they bake potatoes in the ashes and sing songs. For this they are threatened with getting expelled from the pioneer camp. Ivan decides to postpone his studies, take bail for children and join the pioneer life. He takes part on an equal footing in the daily life of his detachment and gains authority.

== Cast ==
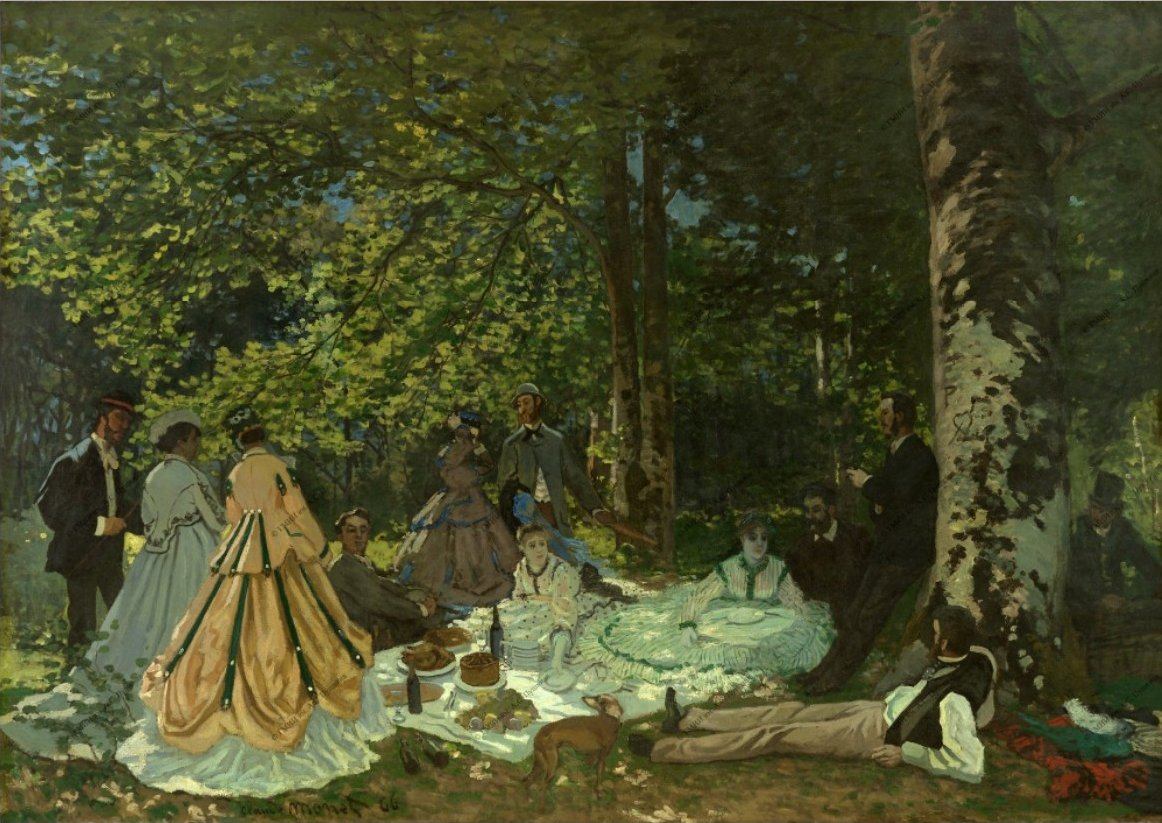
The painting of Claude Monet Le Déjeuner sur l’herbe / Luncheon on the Grass (1865–1866), which is referenced in the film

=== Lead roles ===
- Sergei Prokhanov – Ivan Nikolayevich Kovalev, Pioneer Leader
- Valentina Talyzina – Anna Petrovna, a teacher in the pioneer camp
- Tatyana Lebedkova – Irina, Pioneer Leader
- Lyudmila Graves – Lusia Pinigina, a girl with a low content of hemoglobin, who loves fairy tales and books (voiced by Glagoleva, Vera Vitalevna, Vera Glagoleva)
- Maxim Shirokov – Dima Murashkin, the white crow / pessimistic surrealist who paints cartoons
- Alexander Koptev – Yura Shiryaev
- Igor Knyazev – Mukhanov
- Alexander Zhdanov – Anokhin
- Tatyana Samsonova – fashionista
- Aleksandr Demyanenko – Vasily Vasilievich, the head of the pioneer camp (voiced by Boris Ivanov)
- Gennady Yalovich – Filimonov, a teacher of physical education in the pioneer camp
- Vladimir Novikov – Sergei Pavlovitch, Senior Pioneer Leader (voiced by Aleksandr Belyavsky)
- Irina Yurevich – Zoya

=== Episodic roles ===
- Ekaterina Inozemtseva
- Pavel Kozlovsky
- Larisa Kronberg – neighbor of Ivan (1st part)
- Elena Kozlitina – doctor (1st part)
- Ilya Rutberg – manager (1st part)
- Valentina Telegina – aunt Pasha, a cook in the pioneer camp (voiced by Elena Maksimova)
- Yuri Prokhorov (2nd part)
- Grigory Shpigel (2nd part)
- Children's choreographic collective of the State Academic Folk Dance Ensemble of the USSR under the guidance of Igor Moiseyev

=== Vocal parts ===
- Yevgeny Golovin
- Galina Lushina
- Children's Choir of the Bolshoi Theater
