= A Big Family =

1954 film

- Russian poster
- Directed by: Iosif Kheifits
- Written by: Sokrat Kara; Vsevolod Kochetov
- Starring: Sergei Lukyanov; Boris Andreyev; Vera Kuznetsova
- Cinematography: Sergei Ivanov
- Edited by: D. Lander
- Music by: Venedikt Pushkov
- Production company: Lenfilm
- Release date: 1954
- Running time: 108 minutes
- Country: Soviet Union
- Language: Russian

A Big Family (Russian: Больша́я семья́, translit. Bolshaya semya) is a 1954 Soviet drama film directed by Iosif Kheifits. It was entered into the 1955 Cannes Film Festival. It was based on Vsevolod Kochetov's novel Zhurbiny.

== Plot ==
The film tells the story of the Zhurbin family, a multigenerational clan of shipbuilders. Living under one roof are grandfather Matvei, his son Ilya Matveyevich, Ilya's four sons (Victor, Konstantin, Anton, and Alexei), and his youngest daughter Antonina. The second son, Anton, returns from Leningrad to introduce a new ship assembly method. Meanwhile, the eldest son, Victor, a master model-maker, works to design a universal machine for constructing ship models. The youngest son, Alexei, stands out for his complex character and is central to the film's most challenging narrative threads. Having separated from the family to marry, Alexei faces heartbreak when his fiancée, Katya, becomes involved with a club director who abandons her after learning she is pregnant. Alexei ultimately forgives her and accepts her back, along with her child.

The family faces further trials as Victor’s wife, Lida, leaves, feeling alienated in a household where every member's life revolves around shipbuilding. With the reorganization of the shipyard, many family members must adapt to new professions. Ilya Zhurbin struggles to keep up with the changes, trying to learn algebra to remain relevant. Tensions rise between Ilya and his longtime friend, foreman Basmanov, who believes their era of expertise has passed. Through these challenges, the Zhurbin family grapples with the intersections of tradition, innovation, and personal transformation.

== Cast ==
- Sergei Lukyanov as Matvei Zhurbin
- Boris Andreyev as Ilya Matveyevich Zhurbin
- Vera Kuznetsova as Agafya Karpovna Zhurbina
- Aleksey Batalov as Aleksei Zhurbin
- Sergei Kurilov as Victor Zhurbin
- Vadim Medvedev as Anton Zhurbin
- Boris Bityukov as Kostya Zhurbin
- Iya Arepina as Tanya Zhurbina
- Klara Luchko as Lida Zhurbina
- Ekaterina Savinova as Dunyasha Zhurbina
- Pavel Kadochnikov as Skobelev
- Elena Dobronravova as Katya Travnikova
- Nikolai Gritsenko as Club Manager
- Nikolai Sergeyev as Basmanov
- Larisa Kronberg as Zinaida Ivanova
- Boris Kokovkin as Shipyard Director

== Accolades ==
- 1955 – 1955 Cannes Film Festival – Special prize for best acting ensemble.
