= Aleksandr Tvardovsky =

Soviet poet and writer (1910–1971)

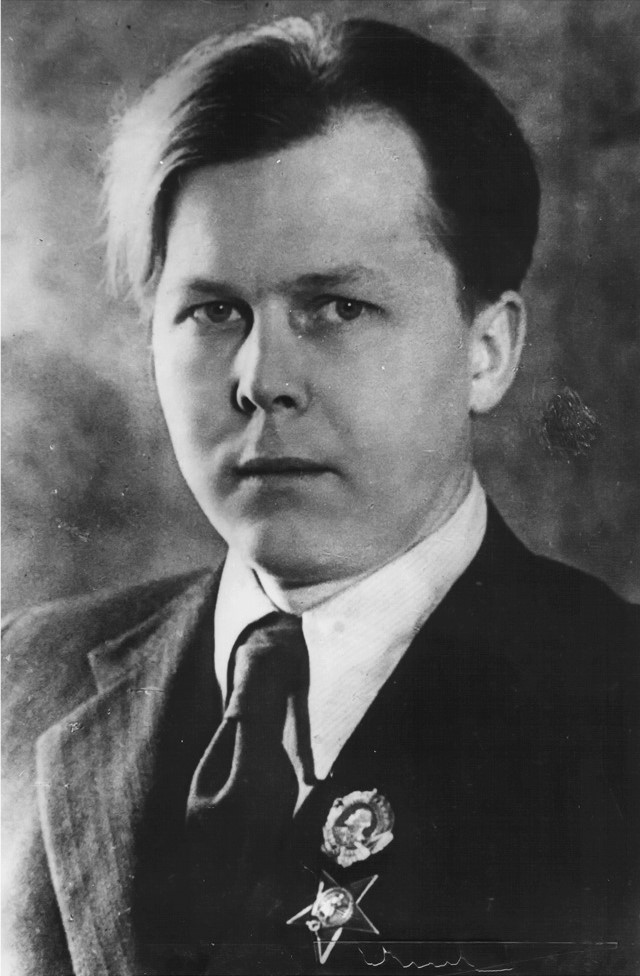
- Tvardovsky in 1941
- Born: 21 June [O.S. 8 June] 1910; Zagorye, Russian Empire
- Died: 18 December 1971 (aged 61); Vatutinki, Moscow Oblast, Russian SFSR, Soviet Union
- Occupations: Poet, prose writer, magazine editor, journalist
- Writing career
- Notable work: Vasili Tyorkin

Aleksandr Trifonovich Tvardovsky (Russian: Александр Трифонович Твардовский, Russian pronunciation: [ɐlʲɪkˈsandr ˈtrʲifənəvʲɪtɕ tvɐrˈdofskʲɪj]; 21 June [O.S. 8 June] 1910 – 18 December 1971) was a Soviet poet and writer and chief editor of Novy Mir literary magazine from 1950 to 1954 and 1958 to 1970. During his editorship, the magazine published One Day in the Life of Ivan Denisovich by Aleksandr Solzhenitsyn. As a poet, he is best known for his epic poem Vasili Tyorkin.

== Biography ==
Tvardovsky was born into a Russian family in Zagorye, in the Smolensky Uyezd of the Smolensk Governorate of the Russian Empire. At the time of his birth, the family lived on a farm that his father had purchased in installments from the Peasant Land Bank. Tvardovsky's father, the son of a landless soldier, was a blacksmith by trade. The farm was situated on poor land, but Tvardovsky's father loved it and was proud of what he had acquired through years of hard labor. He transmitted this love and pride to Aleksandr. Tvardovsky's family was of Belarusian descent, and according to actor Zinovy Gerdt (a friend of Tvardovsky) he often spoke Trasianka in private.

Tvardovsky's father was a well-read and intelligent man who often read to Aleksandr and the rest of the family. From an early age, Aleksandr became familiar with the works of Alexander Pushkin, Nikolai Gogol, Mikhail Lermontov, Nikolay Nekrasov and others. He began composing poetry while still very young. At age 13, he showed some of his poems to a young teacher who gave him misleading criticism, telling him that poetry should be written as unintelligibly as possible. His first published poem was "A New Hut", which was printed in the newspaper, Smolensk Village. After its publication, he collected his poems and showed them to the poet Mikhail Isakovsky. Aleksandr later acknowledged Isakovsky's influence, saying that he had been the only Soviet poet who had had a beneficial effect on him.

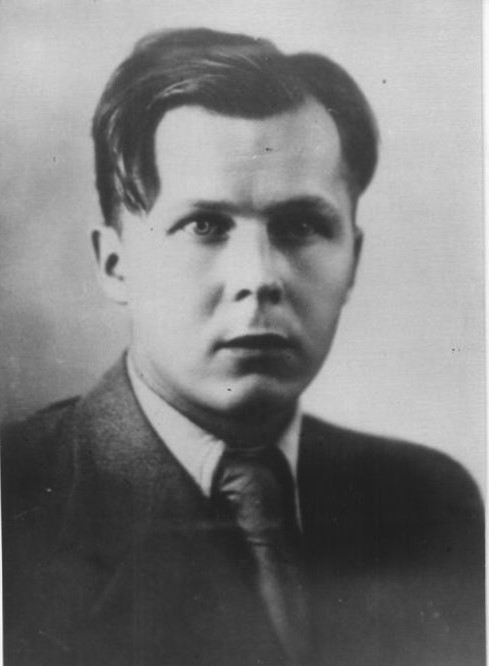
Tvardovsky in 1940

He left the village school because of poverty after attending only four classes and devoted himself entirely to literature. At the age of 18 he went to Smolensk, but was unable to find literary work. In the winter of 1930, after visiting Moscow, he returned to his native village. During this period, he entered a Pedagogical Institute with the help of a party official, but didn't finish his studies there. He completed his education later at the Institute of History, Philosophy and Literature in Moscow. His poem The Land of Muravia was written in 1934–1936 and was favorably received by the critics. This poem, along with his other early narrative poem, The Road to Socialism (1931), were products of Tvardovsky's effort to come to terms with collectivization. He was awarded the Stalin Prize for The Land of Muravia. George Hosking, in his biography of Tvardovskii, praises the book as a candid portrayal of collectivization, marked by Tvardovskii's belief in the system, but also by his family's experience during the period.

Tvardovsky's father was accused of being a kulak during the period of collectivisation in the Soviet Union. In 1930, after Aleksandr had moved to Smolensk, his father ran away from the family home fearing arrest. In 1931, apart from Aleksandr, the whole family was deported from Zagorye. The family spent several years moving from place to place, splitting up and reuniting, looking for work and safety. Some of them spent time in labour camps. Orlando Figes describes Aleksandr's sense of uneasiness at the way his family had been treated while at the same time fearing for himself, his career and growing creative accomplishments if he was to actively help them. In August 1931, his father and brother arrived unexpectedly in Smolensk at his work, and were arrested the same night. It is highly likely that if Tvardovsky had been seen to help his kulak father (a dangerous and criminal element in the eyes of many), he would have been arrested alongside his father. For that reason, Tvardovskii has often been pointed as being responsible for reporting his family members, but who made the call has never been established.

In 1939, he participated in the Soviet invasion of Poland, and also in the Winter War, where he was part of a "writers' brigade" composing patriotic verse. He joined the Communist Party of the Soviet Union in 1940 and was a war correspondent during World War II. Early in the war, he began independently working on his poem Vasili Tyorkin. During the post-war years, he served as chief editor of Novy Mir, an influential literary thick journal. He became the chief editor of Novy Mir in 1949. He was dismissed from his post in 1954 for publishing officially unacceptable articles by V. Pomerantsev, Fyodor Abramov and M. Shcheglov. He was made chief editor again in July 1958.

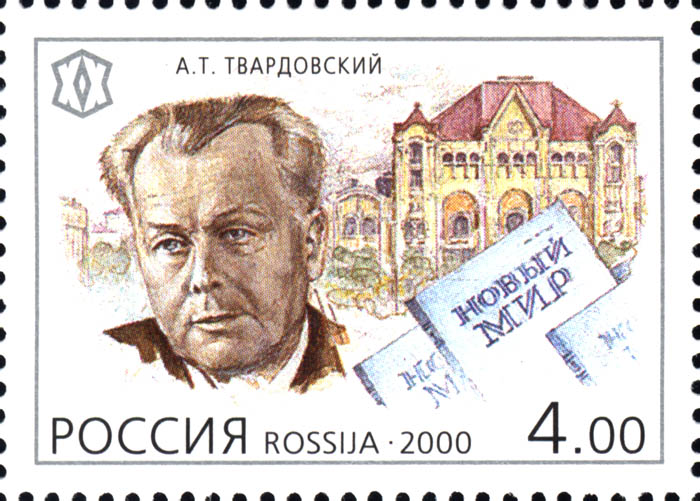

Tvardovsky fought hard to maintain the traditional independence Novy Mir had, even against official disapproval. During his editorship, the magazine published Ilya Ehrenburg's Thaw in 1954, The Vologda Wedding by Alexander Yashin in 1962, and One Day in the Life of Ivan Denisovich by Aleksandr Solzhenitsyn in 1962. During those years, the Oktyabr' magazine, with the editor in chief Vsevolod Kochetov, was the pro-Soviet, anti-Western and anti-liberal counterpart of Tvardovsky's Novy Mir.

In January 1963, Tvardovsky was attacked in Izvestia for publishing Yashin's story, which was considered too pessimistic. The chief editor of Izvestia, Alexei Adzhubey, was a son-in-law of the Soviet leader, Nikita Khrushchev, but the editorial appears to have been organised behind their backs while Khrushchev and Adzhubey were visiting Poland and East Germany. Attacks on Tvardovsky persisted for three months, but he did not issue any apology or retraction. On 18 August 1963, Izvestia published Tvardovsky's poem Tyorkin in the Other World, a satire in which the hero continued to meet bureaucratic obstruction even if the afterlife, with an introduction praising the work, signed by Adzhubey. Tvardovsky wrote this poem in 1954, but it was banned for nine years, and was one of the reasons that he was temporarily dismissed from the editorship of Novy mir. A few days before it was finally published, Tvardovsky was accorded the honour of being invited to recite the poem to Khrushchev and a group of foreign writers in Gagra.

These political ups and downs in Tvardovsky's reputation were part of the power struggle between Khrushchev and hard line communists seeking to protect the legacy of the dictator, Joseph Stalin, whose crimes Khrushchev denounced. In his memoirs, Khrushchev wrote that "Tvardovsky's books - especially his epic poem about Vasili Tyorkin - were a source of strength to us all in World War II ... Tvardovsky gave us some great art, but he ended without recognition and without honour."

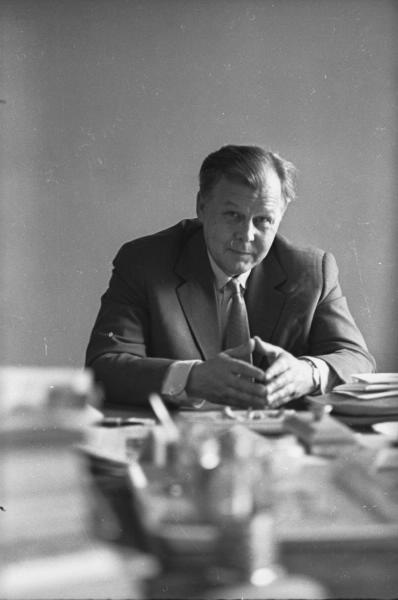
Tvardovsky in 1960

In January 1965, a few month after Khrushchev had been ousted, Tvardovsky wrote an article commemorating 40 years of Novy Mir, in which he singled out several new young writers for praise, including Andrei Sinyavsky. On 15 April, Izvestia - under a new chief editor - commissioned a piece accusing Tvardovsky of 'losing his sense of proportion' when he criticised Stalinist literature, and of being too much of an admirer of Solzhenitsyn. Five months later, Sinyavsky was arrested. According to rumour, the authorities then intended to sack Tvardovsky and appoint Konstantin Simonov in his place, but Simonov refused the position, and Tvardovsky's staff threatened to strike.

In 1968, Tvardovskii wrote his last book, "By Right of Memory", in which he discusses his complicated relationship with his family and his guilt and trauma over the arrest of his father and siblings. He also worked on an unfinished poem on the same themes, which would be named Pan Tvardovskii. The name is a reference to a Polish figure similar to Faust, but also to the title "Pan", "Sir", by which his family members were treated in the region in which Tvardovskii grew.

In February 1970, Tvardovsky was dismissed from Novy Mir. In May, Zhores Medvedev, a contributor to Novy Mir was arrested and interned in a psychiatric hospital in Kaluga. It was common practice in the USSR to abuse psychiatry to silence critics. Tvardovsky and the writer Vladimir Tendryakov visited Medvedev on 6 June, when according to Medvedev, "the doctors were deeply affected by their conversation" and agreed to release Medvedev. On the day he was released, on 17 June, Tvardovsky was summoned before a communist party official, rebuked for interfering in the case and told "we were going to give you a very different award." This was a reference to his 60th birthday, when he was awarded the Order of the Red Banner "for services to the development of Soviet poetry" - implying that he would have received a more prestigious award if he had not intervened.

Devastated at losing the editorship of Novy Mir, Tvardovsky's health collapsed, and he died in December 1971. On hearing of his death, Solzhenitsyn wrote:

There are many ways of killing a poet. The method chosen for Tvardovsky was to take away his off-spring, his passion, his journal. The sixteen years of insults meekly endured by this hero were little, so long as his journal survived, so long as literature was not stopped, so long as people were printed in it and people read it. Too little! So they heaped the coals of disbandment, destruction and injustice upon him. Within six months, these coals had consumed him. Six months later, he took to his death-bed.

== Awards ==
- Two Stalin Prizes second degree (1941, 1947)
- Stalin Prize first degree (1946)
- USSR State Prize (1971)
- Lenin Prize (1961) for the large poem, Distance After Distance (За далью – даль 1950–60), a collection of poetic impressions and meditations on Russian life first conceived during a trip on the Trans-Siberian Railway.

== Legacy ==
=== Vasili Tyorkin ===
Tvardovsky's grave at the Novodevichy Convent in Moscow as it was in March 1973.

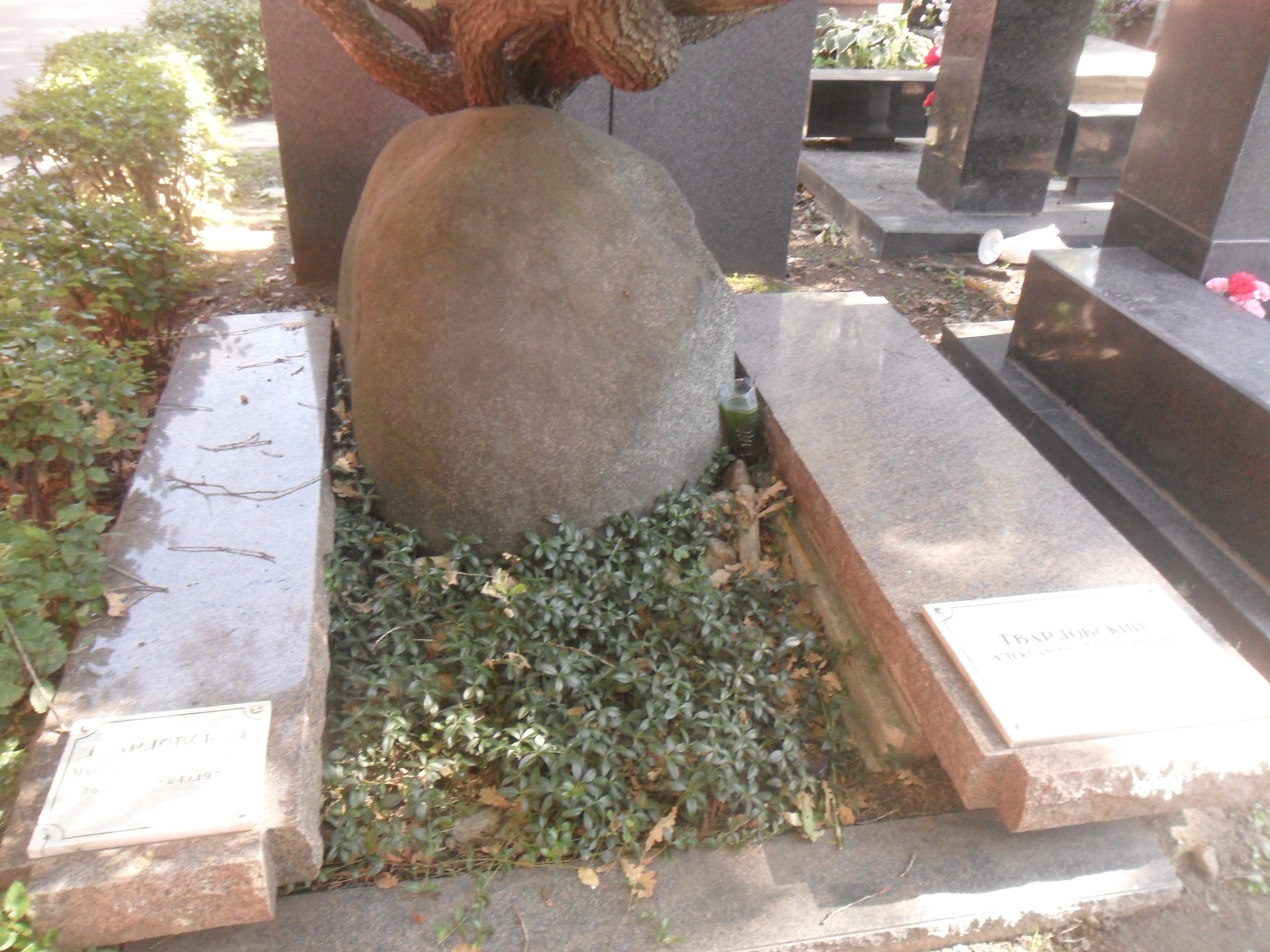
Tvardovsky's grave at the Novodevichy Convent in Moscow

Tvardovsky's most popular long poem, Vasili Tyorkin (Russian: Василий Тёркин. Книга про бойца, 1941–1945), is about an ordinary soldier in the German-Soviet War. Filled with humor, the poem was a hymn to the optimism and resourcefulness of the Russian soldier. It was surprisingly non-politicized, down-to-earth, and intentionally devoid of any picturesque heroism. It was printed chapter by chapter and immediately sent to the front in newspapers and magazines as well as read over the radio by Dmitry Orlov. Tvardovsky was awarded his second Stalin Prize for Vasili Tyorkin.

The poem is regarded by critics as a masterpiece, remarkable for "positive good humor, its freedom from dogma, and its closeness to the reality of <Soviet> life", "a national and even international horizon". It is also unique as a work written during Stalin's regime, as it lacks ideological content, glorification of Stalin and the Soviet state, and triumphalist tone which were required for a work of "Socialist realism". Tvardovsky's wife wrote in 1943: "I have the impression that it is getting dangerous here to pronounce your name aloud", but the poem's popularity saved it from the censorship.

=== Other works ===
Tvardovskii received early success with his poem The Land of Muravia, which speaks about collectivization.

Tvardovsky's World War II-themed poem, A House by the Road, was the basis for Valery Gavrilin's 1984 symphonic suite of the same name. In 1963, Tvardovsky published Tyorkin in the Other World, a satire on the everyday life in the Soviet Union and Stalinism. Tyorkin gets in hell for a short time and finds out that hell is a lot like everyday life in the Soviet Union. Tvardovskii's last work, By the Right of Memory, speaks about the trauma and guilt of his family's deportation as kulaks.

=== Honouring ===
A minor planet 3261 Tvardovskij discovered by Soviet astronomer Nikolai Stepanovich Chernykh in 1979 is named after him.

A Russian crewed freighter, registered in the Cook Islands, is named after Tvardovsky.

== Selected works and English translations ==
- Vasili Tyorkin (Russian: Василий Тёркин. Книга про бойца, 1941–1945)
  - Tyorkin & The Stove Makers, translated by Anthony Rudolf, Carcanet Press, 1974, ISBN 0856350664
  - Vassili Tyorkin: A Book About a Soldier, translated by Alex Miller, Progress Publishers, Moscow, 1975.
  - Vasili Tyorkin: A Book About a Soldier, translated by James W. Womack, Smokestack Books, Ripon, 2020, ISBN 1916012108.
- Tyorkin in the Other World
  - Tyorkin in the Other World, translated by Patricia Wheeler, Smokestack Books, 2022, ISBN 1838465359.
- "Stovemakers" (short story)
  - Such a Simple Thing and Other Stories, Foreign Languages Publishing House, Moscow, 1959.
  - Tyorkin & The Stove Makers, translated by Anthony Rudolf, Carcanet Press, 1974, ISBN 0856350664
- Selected Poetry, Progress Publishers, Moscow, 1981.
- Russian Poetry 1917-1955. Selected, translated and with an introduction by Jack Lindsay, 1955.
