= Nikolai Gribachev =

Soviet writer and poet (1910–1992)

- Николай Грибачёв
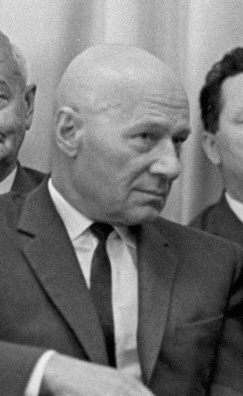
- Gribachev in 1967

Chairman of the Supreme Soviet of the Russian SFSR
- In office 25 March 1980 – 16 May 1990
- Preceded by: Vladimir Kotelnikov
- Succeeded by: None (position abolished)

Personal details
- Born: 19 December 1910 Lopush, Trubchevsky Uyezd, Oryol Governorate, Russian Empire
- Died: 10 March 1992 (aged 81) Moscow, Russia
- Resting place: Troyekurovskoye Cemetery
- Citizenship: Soviet; Russian
- Party: CPSU
- Occupation: Novelist, poet, journalist
- Awards: Hero of Socialist Labour

Military service
- Branch/service: Red Army
- Battles/wars: Winter War; World War II

Nikolai Matveevich Gribachev (Russian: Николай Матвеевич Грибачёв; 19 December 1910 – 10 March 1992) was a Soviet writer and politician.

== Biography ==
Gribachev was born in to a poor peasant family. After completing the seventh grade, he studied at the hydromelioration technical school. From 1926 he appeared with newspaper publications with poems and journalistic work. He worked in search and construction parties in Karelia, published, in addition to correspondence on special issues, poems and feuilletons (in particular, in the newspaper "Red Karelia" where he headed the department from 1932).

In 1934, he was a delegate to the first congress of Soviet Writers. In 1935, the first book "Northwest" was published. From 1936 he worked in the newspaper "Robitnychiy shlyach" (Worker's Way) in Smolensk, where in 1939 he published his collection of poems.

He took part in the Soviet-Finnish war. In 1941, he volunteered for the army again after the German invasion and was commander of the riflemen of a platoon of a sapper battalion. From 1943, he was a special correspondent of the newspaper "Boevoi Tovarish" ("Comrade in Combat"), where his poem "Rosiya" ("Russia") was first published. In the same year Gribachev officially joined the Communist Party.

From 1950 to 1954 and again from 1956 to 1986 Gribachev was the editor-in-chief of the magazine "Soviet Union". In 1953–1954 and from 1959, he was the secretary of the board of the Union of Soviet Writers.

In 1961, he headed the All-Union Committee to commemorate the 100th anniversary of Taras Shevchenko's death. Author of the article about Shevchenko "Singer of the Brotherhood of Nations" (1964), the poem "Taras Shevchenko" (1964).

Gribachev, according to most of his contemporaries primarily as an official party author who consciously put his poetry at the service of the government. He was one of the main participants of the anti-cosmpolitan campaign, mainly attacking the works of Anna Akhmatova and Mikhail Zoshchenko. However, he sometimes maintained an independent position and helped disgraced writers (for example, Aleksei Adzhubei), sought to award prizes to worthy people. He was one of the signatories of the Letter from a group of Soviet writers about Solzhenitsyn and Sakharov.

From 1980 to 1990, Gribachev served as chairman of the Supreme Soviet of the Russian SFSR, being the last person who served in this position.
