= Fyodor Panfyorov =

Soviet writer (1896–1960)

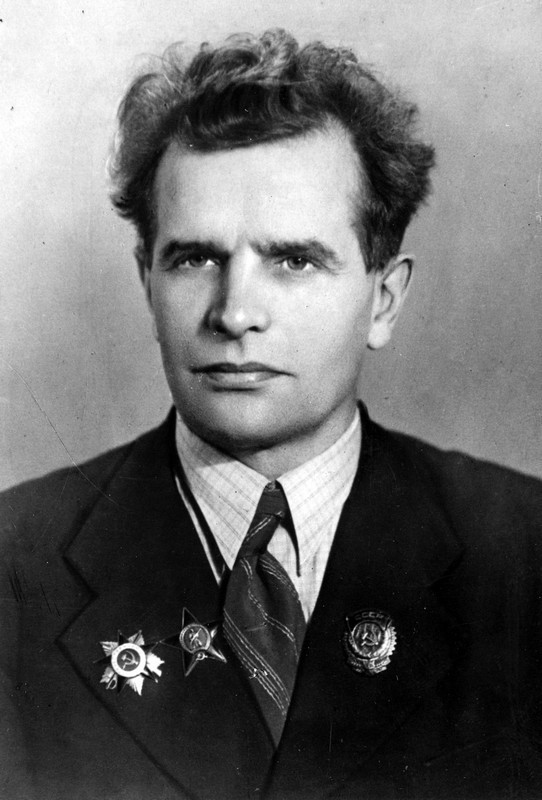
- Fyodor Panfyorov in 1946
- Born: October 2, 1896; Pavlovka, Saratov Governorate, Russian Empire
- Died: September 10, 1960 (aged 63); Moscow, Russian SFSR, Soviet Union
- Occupations: Writer, essayist, editor
- Writing career
- Notable work: Bruski
- Literary movement: Socialist realism

Fyodor Ivanovich Panfyorov (Russian: Фёдор Иванович Панфёров; 2 October 1896 – 10 September 1960) was a Soviet writer.

== Life and career ==
Fyodor Panfjorov was born into a poor peasant family. Due to a lack of funds, he had to leave his studies at the Volski teacher's seminar. After the October revolution, he worked in the editorial office of a local newspaper, in the engagement committee of the Russian Communist Party (b) and in the agricultural commune he founded. His first published works of fiction appeared in 1920. In 1926, Panfyorov joined the Communist Party.

From 1924 to 1931 he worked as an editor of the Krestjanski zhurnal (Peasant Journal), and from 1931 until his death 1960, at short intervals, as the editor-in-chief of the Oktyabr literary magazine. In the 1920s, he served as the head of the Association of Proletarian Writers of Russia and from 1934 as a member of the board of the Union of Soviet Writers. In the 1930s and 1950s, Panfyorov was also a representative of the Supreme Soviet of the Soviet Union.

Panfjorov's main work is the extensive novel Bruski, describing the collectivization of agriculture. In time, the novel received the support of the authorities. After the Second World War, Panfyorov wrote a tendentious trilogy of novels Borba za mir ("Fight for peace", 1945–1947), V strane poveržennyh ("In the land of the vanquished", 1948), Bolšoje iskusstvo ("Great art", 1939), of which two for the first volume he received the Stalin Prize.

He died on September 10, 1960 and was buried at the Novodevichy Cemetery.
