= Larisa Kronberg =

Soviet actress

- Born: Larisa Ivanovna Kronberg; 23 May 1929; Penza, Russian SFSR, Soviet Union
- Died: 23 April 2017 (aged 87); Moscow, Russia
- Other names: Larisa Kronberg-Sobolevskaya, Larisa Sobolevskaya
- Education: All-Union State Institute of Cinematography
- Occupation: Actress

Larisa Ivanovna Kronberg (also known as Larisa Kronberg-Sobolevskaya and Larisa Sobolevskaya, Russian: Лариса Ивановна Кронберг; 23 May 1929 – 23 April 2017) was a Soviet Russian actress and a KGB agent.

== Biography ==
Kronberg was born in Penza, Soviet Union, the daughter of an army officer. She first lived with her father in Ufa and later moved to Podolsk, where she graduated. After graduation, she enrolled for the All-Union State Institute of Cinematography in 1948. She interrupted her education when she married a man from Georgia and gave birth to her son. However, she divorced before turning 30 and her son died early from drug abuse. In 1954, she got her acting degree and worked for Mosfilm until 1983.

She was named Best Actress at the 1955 Cannes Film Festival for her performance in A Big Family, directed by Iosif Kheifits.

In 1958, she was involved in the Ambassador Dejean Affair: Kronberg lured Dejean in a honey trap.

She was in a long-time relationship with World Chess Champion Mikhail Tal since about 1960, they parted in the late 1960s. In her last years, she lived alone in a flat in Moscow, where she died on 23 April 2017 after a long illness.

== Selected filmography ==
- A Big Family (1954)
- A Girl with a Guitar (1958)
- Russian Souvenir (1960)
- Incognito from St. Petersburg (1977)
- The Luncheon on the Grass (1979)
