= Ivan Gronsky =

Soviet journalist and literary critic

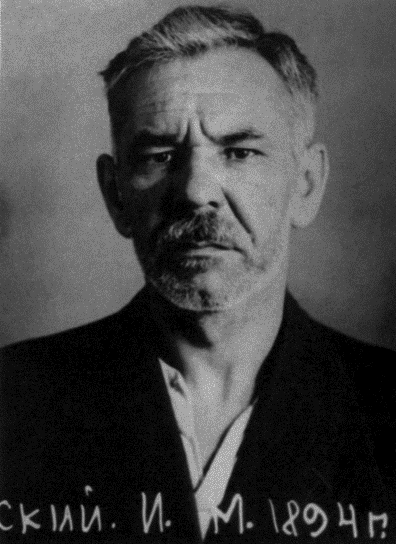
Ivan Gronsky after his arrest by the NKVD in 1938

Ivan Mikhailovich Gronsky (Russian: Иван Михайлович Гронский) (real surname: Fedulov) (30 November 1894 – 15 August 1985) was a Russian Soviet public figure, journalist, literary critic and Communist Party official, who survived long imprisonment in the Gulag.

== Early life ==
Ivan Fedulov/Gronsky was born into a peasant family in the Lyubimsky district of Yaroslavl province, in Russia. His father died when he was young, and at the age of 12 he was sent to St Petersburg where he worked as a cook, loader, and locksmith. As a teenager he joined the Union of Socialists-Revolutionaries Maximalists in 1912. He had a few pieces published in radical newspapers, for which he was invited by Maxim Gorky to his home, when he met some of Russia's leading cultural figures. He served in the Russian army during World War I, and awarded the St George for bravery.

After the Bolshevik Revolution in October 1917 (old style), Gronsky was elected to represent soldiers from his infantry division on the Dvina front. Gronsky broke with the Socialist Revolutionaries when right wing SRs, led by Boris Savinkov attempted a coup against Bolshevik rule in Yaroslavl in 1918. He joined the Russian Communist Party (b) soon afterwards, in July 1918. In 1921, he was enrolled in the Institute of Red Professors, to study economics. In 1924, he was selected for an internship to study in the United Kingdom. under John Maynard Keynes, but was assigned to party work in Kolomna instead.

In 1925, Gronsky joined the staff of Izvestia. After the death of Ivan Skvortsov-Stepanov in 1928, Gronsky was appointed chief editor.

He was credited with helping to rescue the career of the popular writer Boris Pilnyak, who was the target of a campaign by the Russian Association of Proletarian Writers (RAPP). In 1930 Gronsky persuaded Pilnyak to write the novel The Volga Flows to the Caspian Sea, celebrating the drive to industrialise Russia, which rehabilitated him in the eyes of the communist leadership.

== 'Socialist Realism' and the Writers' Union ==
In April 1932, Gronsky was appointed a member of a five-man commission to review the situation in the soviet arts, in the wake of the disbanding of RAPP. Shortly before the commission met, he was summoned to a private session with Joseph Stalin, in which they discussed literary politics, and came up with the term Socialist Realism to define what was to be the official style of soviet literature for the remainder of the 1930s. Gronsky later defined Socialist Realism as "Rembrant, Rubens and Repin put at the service of the working class".

In May 1932, he was appointed Chairman of the Organising Committee of the USSR Writers' Union, with Maxim Gorky as Honorary Chairman. As Gorky was being lured back to live permanently in Russia, and take on the chairmanship of the Writers Union, Gronsky was at a meeting in which Stalin proposed to rename Nizhny Novgorod, Tverskaya Street in Moscow, and the Moscow Art Theatre in Gorky's honour, Gronsky claimed later that he objected that the MAT was more associated with Anton Chekhov than Gorky, but was overruled.

In 1932–37, Gronsky was chief editor of the literary magazine Novy Mir, and instigated the practice of printing a portrait of Stalin and a poem to his glory in almost every issue of the magazine. The poet Boris Pasternak thought he was "stupid", telling the visiting French writer André Gide that Gronsky had introduced a practice of printing a portrait of Stalin and a poem to his glory in almost every issue of Novy Mir, and that he talked in political cliches - "but it is impossible to blame him for that".

Gronsky's wife's sister was married to the poet, Pavel Vasiliev, from whom he learnt that one of Russia's most talented living poets, Nikolai Klyuev was an active homosexual. Gronsky immediately denounced Klyuev, who was arrested on 2 February 1934, and later shot.

== Role in the Purges ==
On 1 September 1936, after the conclusion of the first of the Moscow Show Trials, Gronsky summoned a meeting of Novy mir's staff and contributors, telling them the magazine had been infiltrated by the alleged 'Trotskyite-Zinovievite conspiracy', and criticised himself and others, including Boris Pilnyak, in what was an evident attempt to save himself and the magazine. This failed. He was sacked from the editorship in April 1937 for his alleged lack of 'Bolshevik vigilance' - i.e. for having published works by Boris Pilnyak, Galina Serebryakova and others now under arrest, and by Boris Pasternak, who was under suspicion.

Years after the event, it was reported that Gronsky courageously rang Stalin to protest when Marshal Tukhachevsky was arrested in May 1937, but was abruptly told by the General Secretary to "mind his own business" - despite which, he even more courageously tried to intervene on behalf of Marshal Blyukher. The first story seems unlikely, because Marshal Tukhachevsky's arrest came a month after Gronsky had been sacked, and Marshal Blyukher was the one who sentenced Tukhachevsky to death. The second is certainly untrue, because when Blyukher was arrested in October 1938, Gronsky was already in custody.

== Arrest and Exile ==
Gronsky was summoned to NKVD headquarters on 30 June 1938, and went voluntarily, not expecting to be arrested. He was held in solitary confinement and accused of creating a conspiratorial 'centre' in 1932 with Aleksei Stetsky. Stetsky had already 'confessed', possibly under torture, that he had instructed Gronsky to conduct sabotage, by not countering the influence of the disbanded Russian Association of Proletarian Writers, and by publishing the writers Fyodor Gladkov and Leonid Leonov - who both earned distinction during the war with Nazi Germany as war correspondents. He was also falsely accused of supporting the Savinkov coup in Yaroslavl in 1918. He was held for 11 months, tortured, and then sentenced to 15 years in the gulag. He was deported to Kotlas in Arkhangelsk province, and then to Vorkuta, where he was compelled to do hard labour, including coal mining. In April 1953, he was exiled to Karaganda.

== Release and later life ==
He was released from exile and allowed to return to Moscow when his case was reviewed in February 1954. The case was officially closed on the 16th anniversary of his arrest.

In retirement, he wrote extensively, and retained his belief in the communist system. He was buried at the Kuntsevo Cemetery in Moscow.
