= Sergey Narovchatov =

Soviet poet and journalist (1919–1981)

- Сергей Сергеевич Наровчатов
- Born: 3 October 1919; Khvalynsk, Saratov Governorate, RSFSR
- Died: 22 July 1981 (aged 61); Koktebel, Soviet Union
- Education: Moscow Institute of History, Philosophy and Literature; Maxim Gorky Literature Institute
- Occupations: Poet, publicist, Editor-in-chief
- Writing career
- Notable awards: Gorki State Prize of the RSFSR
- Literary movement: Socialist realism

Sergey Sergeyevich Narovchatov (Russian: Сергей Сергеевич Наровчатов; 3 October 1919, Khvalynsk – 22 July 1981, Koktebel) was a Soviet and Russian poet, writer and editor-in-chief of the literary magazine Novy Mir from 1974 to 1981.

== Works ==
- "Необычное литературоведение" (Unusual Study of Literature) (1970)
- "Атлантида рядом с тобой" (Atlantis Next to You) (1972)
- "Живая река" (Living River) (1974)
