= Galina Serebryakova =

Russian writer and anti-Stalinist

- Галина Иосифовна Серебрякова
- Born: 20 December [O.S. 7 December] 1905; Kiev, Russian Empire
- Died: 30 June 1980 (aged 74); Moscow, Soviet Union

Galina Iosifovna Serebryakova (Russian: Галина Иосифовна Серебрякова; 20 December [O.S. 7 December] 1905 – 30 June 1980) was a Soviet Russian writer and journalist, author of novels about Marx and Engels.

== Family ==
Serebryakova was the daughter of professional revolutionaries. In childhood, she shared her surname with her mother, Bronislava Sigismundowna Krasutskaya (Красуцкая), a graduate of the Warsaw academy, who spoke six languages and who was disowned by her father, a Polish tobacco manufacturer, because of her revolutionary activities. Serebryakova's father was Iosif Moiseyevich Byk-Bek, a member of the Jewish Bund and medical student at Warsaw University. Both her parents supported the Bolshevik Revolution, and served with the Red Army Russian Civil War, including its final stage, the capture of the Crimea, where their 16-year-old daughter was appointed a commissioner for culture.

At the age of 18, she married Leonid Serebryakov, and they had a daughter, Zorya, born 1923. Her husband, and her father both signed The Declaration of the 46 in 1923, and supported Leon Trotsky in the factional struggle that tore apart the Communist Party of the Soviet Union after the death of Vladimir Lenin. They were both expelled from the communist party in 1927. There is no record that Serebryakova was anything but a supporter of Joseph Stalin. In 1925, she married Grigory Sokolnikov, a leading opponent of the Trotskyist left, who joined the opposition only briefly in 1926. They had a daughter, Geliana, born in 1934.

== Career ==
In 1920–1925, she studied at the Medical Faculty of Moscow State University, after which she worked in journalism. In the 1920s she began her career as an opera singer: in 1928 she sang at a big radio concert in London, received an invitation to the Bolshoi Theatre troupe.. Working as a journalist for Komsomolskaya Pravda, she was sent on assignments in China, in 1927, and Geneva and Paris. In 1929, she published a study of the women of the French Revolution. In 1930–32, she joined Sokolnikov in London, where he was the USSR Ambassador, after which she published an account of her time there Confrontation: Pictures of English Life. The journalist Malcolm Muggeridge described meeting her at the country home of Beatrice Webb:

Mme Sokolnikova was livelier altogether than her spouse; a large ebullient woman, dark and hairy, who, had she been English, might well have espoused the cause of family planning, and perhaps married a clergyman. If American, I see her more as a popular novelist in the style of Mrs Parkinson Keyes; or maybe an anthropologist exploring the sexual ways of Papuans in the manner of Margaret Mead. In the circumstances of our meeting, I found her rather attractive...

Her most ambitious project was a three-volume fictionalised life of Karl Marx. The first volume, The Young Marx was published in 1934–35.

== Arrest ==
Serebryakova's husband, Grigory Sokolnikov, and her father, Iosif Moiseyevich Byk-Bek, were both arrested early in the Great Purge of July 1936, and her ex-husband, Leonid Serebryakov, was arrested in August. Sokolnikov and Serebryakov were defendants at the second of the Moscow trials in January 1937. This left her exposed. On 27 August 1936, the secretary of the Union of Soviet Writers, Vladimir Stavsky announced her expulsion from the union in the magazine Literaturnaya Gazeta, warning: "We accepted her as a comrade and did not recognise the enemy in her...Many evenings were devoted to discussion of Serebryakova's works. We served the enemy with our own hands..." She then endured months of harassment by the NKVD, which included being invited to the Lubyanka Building for interrogation every evening, and kept there until five in the morning. Her house was also under watch, and a car followed her whenever she went out. Aware of her impending arrest, she attempted suicide. After several months, she was arrested and deported in June 1937 to Semipalatinsk with her mother and two-year-old daughter. Arrested again in December 1937, she was sentenced in 1939 to eight years in the Gulag. Released in 1945, she settled in Dzhambul, but was arrested again in May 1949, she was sentenced to 10 years in the Gulag. She was released in 1955.

== Later career ==
Serebryakova's convictions were overturned after Nikita Khrushchev had denounced Stalin's crimes at the 20th party congress in 1956, and she was able to return to Moscow and resume work on her life of Marx. The second volume appeared in 1961, and the third volume in 1962. The completed novel was turned into a film, A Year is a Like a Lifetime (1965) for which she persuaded the Soviet Union's greatest composer, Dmitri Shostakovich, to write the music. She had known the composer since the 1920s, when - according to the controversial writer, Solomon Volkov, they were lovers. Other biographers of Shostakovich describe them simply as close friends. He regretted accepting this assignment and considered it a failure.

She also wrote an account of her imprisonment and exile, Smerch (Whirlwind), which could not be published in the Soviet Union. It first appeared in an emigre journal in Paris, in 1967, and was published in Russia, posthumously, in 2005.

In 1961, Serebryakova announced in Pravda that during her long imprisonment she did not "lose faith in our Leninist party or in the all-conquering teaching of Marx and Lenin". This made her an important ally of the party leader Nikita Khrushchev, both against hard line communists who resented his denunciation of Joseph Stalin, and liberals who wanted more liberalisation of the communist regime. On 17 December 1962, she participated in a meeting of 400 representatives of the arts, in the presence of Khrushchev and other party leaders, and launched an attack on the writer Ilya Ehrenburg, who was leading the campaign for more liberalisation, accusing him of having acted as 'Stalin's mouthpiece', and suggested that he had caused the deaths of members of the Jewish Anti-Fascist Committee in 1948–52. This outburst was excluded from the published record of the meeting.

This appears to have been the occasion when, according to Volkov:

In front of Khrushchev and other party leaders, she started to talk about standing in front of an execution squad and about being tortured in prison - and she unbuttoned her blouse to show the scars. Someone in the audience fainted. When Serebryakova finished speaking, she was approached by Shostakovich, whom she had not seen in twenty years. It was he who had fainted.

On 17 April 1964, she was of the speakers at a banquet in the Kremlin to celebrate Khrushchev's 70th birthday, and hailed him as "one of the truly superior men of our time...The whole world knows and honours him. It is difficult to imagine a simpler, more approachable, more cheerful man...one of the most original and outstanding orators of our time..."

Her support for Khrushchev aroused the hostility and contempt of other Gulag survivors, such as the Nobel laureate Aleksandr Solzhenitsyn, who described her as a "loud mouth", and alleged that she enjoyed a privileged status in the Gulag by being allowed to work as a nurse, though she had no medical training. He also hinted at rumours that she was an informant, though added: "I did not have the opportunity of checking this." According to her daughter, Geliana, in the last five years of her life Serebryakova was "offended by the Writers' Union, for spreading rumors and gossip" and suffered physically and mentally as a result. She died in 1980.
