= Oktyabr (magazine) =

Monthly literary magazine in Russia (1924–2019)

- Editor-in-chief: Irina Barmetova (2001–2019)
- Categories: Literary magazine
- Frequency: Monthly
- Founder: Alexander Bezymensky; Yury Libedinsky
- Founded: 1924
- Final issue: January 2019
- Country: Soviet Union; Russia
- Based in: Moscow
- Language: Russian
- Website: www.oktyabr.org
- ISSN: 0132-0637
- OCLC: 643669233

Oktyabr (Russian: Октябрь, IPA: [ɐkˈtʲabrʲ], "October'") was a monthly Russian literary magazine based in Moscow. It was in circulation between 1924 and 2019. In addition to Novy Mir and Znamya the monthly was a leading and deep-rooted literary magazine in Russia.

== History ==
Oktyabr was launched in 1924 by a group with the same name, "Oktyabr", which was founded by the poet Alexander Bezymensky and the novelist Yury Libedinsky in 1922. It was an official organ of the Soviet Union and had a conservative political stance. Particularly during the post-World War II period it became one of the most pro-government publications and was instrumental in shaping the image of Soviet poetry.

The editorial board of the magazine in the Soviet era included those figures recognized by the state. The first chief editor was Labory Kalmanson who was also known as G. Lelevich. Fyodor Ivanovich Panferov served as chief editor of the monthly for two times (from 1931 to 1954, and then from 1957 to 1961). Vsevolod Kochetov was the chief editor in the period 1961–1973. In the same period, the monthly was a fierce critic of Nikita Khrushchev's reforms, adopting a Stalinist stance. In other words, Oktyabr was among the thick journals of that period in the Soviet Union. Anatoly Ananiev replaced Vsevold Kochetov as chief editor of Oktyabr in 1973. The last editor-in-chief was Irina Barmetova who assumed the post in 2001 and continued to edit the magazine until its closure in January 2019.

The magazine awarded the Oktyabr prize. The 2013 winners were Andrey Bitov for the story "Something with love... ", director Leonid Heifetz for his article "Flashes" and poet Lev Kozlowski for a selection of verses "Sukhoy Bridge".

== Content ==
Oktyabr serialized various novels, published poems and other articles about movies and societal issues. Due to such a wide coverage, the magazine was compared to the 19th century edition of Edinburgh Review. In the late 1970s, Anatoly Rybakov’s novel, Heavy Sands, was serialized in the monthly. Life and Fate, a novel written by Vasily Grossman, was first published in the magazine in 1988. This novel was one of the forbidden literary works in the country and therefore, the magazine became one of the publications publishing previously forbidden books in the glasnost period. In 2006, the magazine published Vasili Aksyonov's novel Moskva-kva-kva. The monthly also published poems of significant and state-recognized poets in the Soviet era, forming the image of Soviet poetry, and works on literary criticism.

In addition to literary works, in the 1960s the magazine covered articles on Soviet films, focusing on the merits of these movies. Mikhail Antonov's seminal essay, "So What Is Happening to Us?", was published in Oktyabr in 1989.

In 1989, the magazine published a posthumous work, Forever Flowing, by Vasily Grossman, arguing "Lenin - all victories of the party and the state are linked with the name of Lenin. But all cruelty committed in the country has become the tragic burden of Vladimir Ilych." The article was written long before, but it was one of the first overt criticisms against Lenin. Thus, it marked a serious challenge process towards the past of the country, especially Lenin's legacy.
