= Richard Morris (author) =

American poet

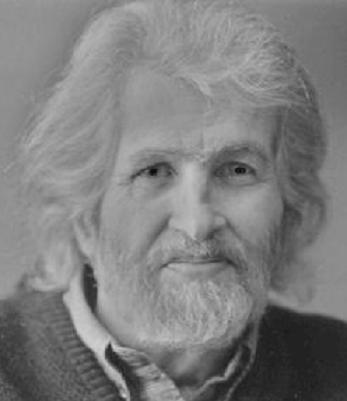
- Richard Ward Morris
- Born: 1939; U.S.
- Died: August 28, 2003 (aged 63–64)
- Education: University of New Mexico; University of Nevada, Reno
- Occupations: Writer, poet, editor
- Writing career
- Genre: Popular science books
- Notable works: Committee of Small Magazine Editors and Publishers

Richard Ward Morris (1939–August 28, 2003) was an American author, editor, and poet. He published more than 20 books in his lifetime, many of which were written to "explain the intricacies of science to the general public". His literary style and narrative talents allowed for easy reading of what were otherwise heady and intellectual topics, bringing sometimes abstract scientific ideas to a level the common person could understand.

== Career ==
Morris received his MS in physics from the University of New Mexico and his PhD in physics from the University of Nevada, Reno, before he moved to San Francisco, where he started the magazine Camels Coming.

In 1968, he established and became the executive director of the Committee of Small Magazine Editors and Publishers (COSMEP). It was an attempt to organize the energy of the small presses. His COSMEP newsletter guided literary magazines and underground press publications right through the Vietnam War into the Ronald Reagan era.

Beginning in 1979, Morris became known to the wider world as the author of a series of mainstream science books. His literary style and narrative talents allowed for easy reading of what were otherwise heady and intellectual topics, bringing sometimes abstract scientific ideas to a level the common person could understand.

He published as well poetry, fiction, and drama. He still continued publishing small press collections of poetry and drama, which were read mostly by his friends and peers; his selected poetry, Assyrians, was published in 1991 by "The Smith".

The Evolutionists: The Struggle for Darwin's Soul (2002) deviated from his usual fare, but evolution and the controversies surrounding it through history had become his interest later in life.

His final work, The Last Sorcerers: The Path from Alchemy to the Periodic Table, was published posthumously in 2003.

== Bibliography ==
- Light: From Genesis to Modern Physics (1979)
- The End of the World (1980)
- The Fate of the Universe (1982)
- Evolution and Human Nature (1983)
- Dismantling the Universe: The Nature of Scientific Discovery (1984)
- Time's Arrows: Scientific Attitudes Toward Time (1986)
- The Nature of Reality: The Universe After Einstein (1988)
- The Edges of Science: Crossing the Boundary from Physics to Metaphysics (1990)
- Cosmic Questions: Galactic Halos, Cold Dark Matter and the End of Time (Wiley Popular Science) (1995)
- Achilles in the Quantum Universe: the Definitive History of Infinity (1997)
- The Universe, the Eleventh Dimension, and Everything: What We Know and How We Know It (1999)
- The Evolutionists: The Struggle for Darwin's Soul (2002)
- The Big Questions: Probing the Promise and Limits of Science (2002)
- Morris, Richard (2003). The Last Sorcerers: The Path from Alchemy to the Periodic Table. Washington, D.C.: Joseph Henry Press. ISBN 978-0-309-08905-0. OCLC 52901185.
