= Aleksandr Tvardovsky (cargo vessel) =

Aleksandr Tvardovsky is a cargo vessel. She is owned by a company based in Malta, registered in the Cook Islands, and crewed by Russians.

On June 26, 2018, she was detained in Leith for safety reasons, and lack of payment of her crew. On July 4, 2018, after nine days of detention, the vessel's captain appealed to authorities to supply the ship with food.
