= Sukharevka =

Sukharevka Сухаревка
- Village
- Location within Bashkortostan Location within Russia
- Coordinates: 53°16′N 55°46′E
- Country: Russia
- Region: Bashkortostan
- District: Meleuzovsky District
- Time zone: UTC+5:00

Sukharevka (Russian: Сухаревка) is a rural locality (a village) in Korneyevsky Selsoviet, Meleuzovsky District, Bashkortostan, Russia. The population was 239 as of 2010. There is one street.

== Geography ==
Sukharevka is located 49 km north of Meleuz (the district's administrative centre) by road. Davletkulovo is the nearest rural locality.
