= Vladimir Stavsky =

Soviet author and literary official

Vladimir Petrovich Stavsky
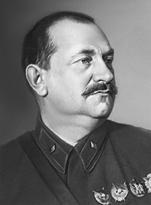
- Born: Vladimir Petrovich Kirpichnikov; 30 July 1900; Penza, Russian Empire
- Died: 14 November 1943 (aged 43); Nevel, Pskov Oblast, USSR
- Occupations: writer editor literary administrator
- Years active: 1924–1943
- Awards: Order of the Red Banner (2); Order of Lenin

Vladimir Petrovich Stavsky (Владимир Петрович Ставский; born Kirpichnikov, Кирпичников; 30 July 1900 – 14 November 1943) was a Soviet Russian writer, editor (in 1937–1941, of Novy Mir) and literary administrator, the head of the Soviet Union of Writers in 1936–1941. As World War II broke out, Stavsky relinquished his posts and, as a war correspondent for Pravda newspaper, went first to Mongolia then to the Winter War (where he was severely injured) and finally to the Western front where in 1943 he was killed in combat.

== Biography ==
=== Early career ===
Vladimir Petrovich Kirpichnikov was born in Penza, to a family of a cabinet-maker. After his mother's death in 1915, he went to work, in 1918 joined the Red Army and soon became a commander of a fighting unit engaged in the suppression of numerous anti-Bolshevik mutinies. In 1918 Kirpichnikov, now a Russian Communist Party (b) (RKP(B)) member, was transferred to the Caucasian Front's First Army's HQ, joined the local military section of Cheka, and by the end of the Civil War had been a brigade commissar.

After demobilization in 1922, Kirpichnikov started his journalistic and literary career, starting out as a Rostov-on-Don-based Molot newspaper author. Three years later, now a secretary of the Northern Caucasian Association of Proletarian Writers (СКАПП), and the Communist Party official superintending the stocking up of wheat harvest in Kuban, he joined Na Podyome (On the Rise) magazine as its editor-in-chief. In 1928 he moved to Moscow to become the Russian Association of Proletarian Writers secretary. Writing under the pseudonym Stavsky, Kirpichnikov published several short novels, a book of short stories and numerous documentary sketches, highlighting collectivization, calling for ruthlessness in the class war and singing paeans to Stalin's internal politics.

=== Head of the Union of Writers ===
In 1932, under the guidance of the CPSU Central Committee, Stavsky took active part in the formation of the Soviet Union of Writers, of which he became the General Secretary in 1936, after Maxim Gorky's death. As such, Stavsky sanctioned the suppression and subsequent prosecution of many prominent literary figures. Boris Pasternak, who survived, was one of his first targets. Pasternak crossed Stavsky by refusing to sign an Open Letter calling for death sentences for Grigori Zinoviev and the other defendants at the show trial of August 1936. Stavsky forged Pasternak's signature on the letter, and delivered a long complaint against Pasternak at a writers' meeting in December. Mikhail Sholokhov might have been the victim of his overzealousness too: after paying a visit to the And Quiet Flows the Don author on 16 September 1937, Stavsky wrote a personal report to Stalin, accusing Sholokhov of being 'politically misguided'. In his 1938 letter to the NKVD narkom Nikolai Yezhov, Stavsky demanded to "resolve the question of Mandelshtam," labeling the latter's poetry as 'obscene and libelous'. Soon after that, the poet was arrested and sentenced to five years of hard labour. In the same letter Stavsky condemned Valentin Katayev and Iosif Prut for "defending Mandelshtam violently." During 1938, he kept a private diary, in which he recorded his growing fear for his own future. In August, he told a fellow official, Pyotr Pospelov "Sooner or later it will all be clear who it was that wanted to do me in, a good Stalinist and Bolshevik."

=== World War II and death ===
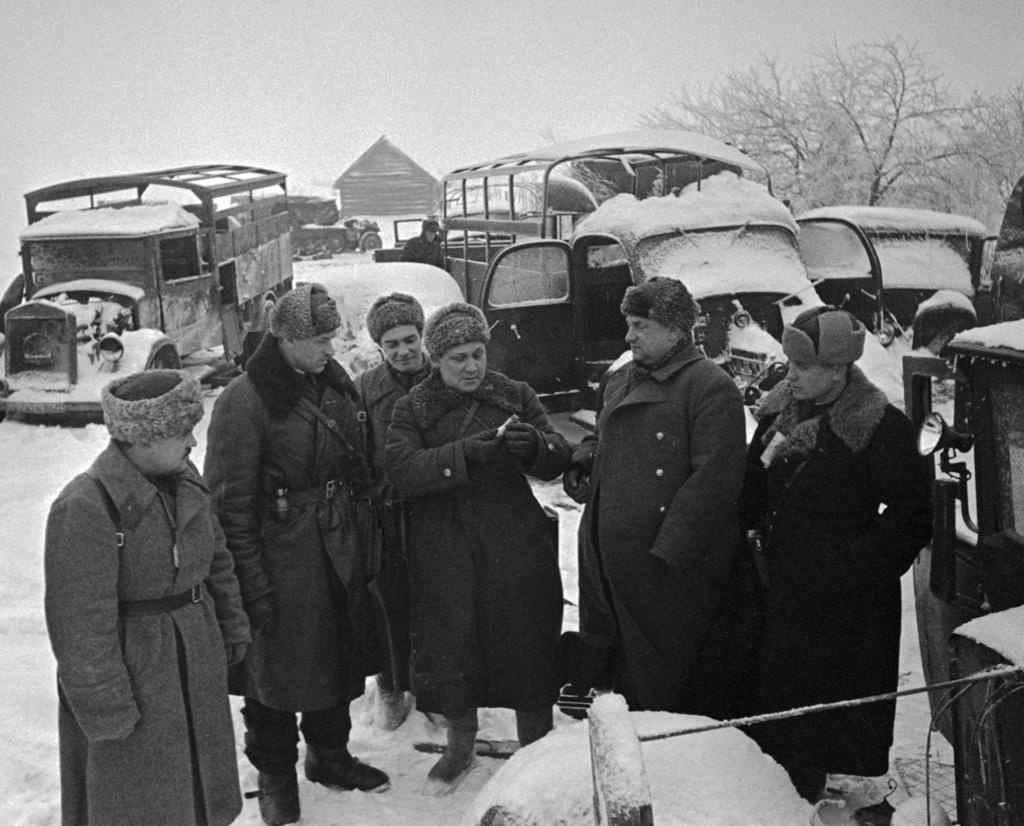
Commander of the 16th Army Konstantin Rokossovsky (second from left), member of the Military Council A.A. Lobachev and Pravda correspondent Vladimir Stavsky inspect enemy equipment captured by Soviet troops, December 10, 1941.

As World War II broke out, Stavsky relinquished his posts and, as a war correspondent, went first to Mongolia then to the Finnish War (where he was heavily injured), the Western and the Kalinin Fronts. Stavsky, the only Soviet author to have received two Orders of the Red Banner before 1941, was lauded for bravery by colleagues. In November 1943, accompanying the Red Army sniper Klavdia Ivanova, he entered the neutral zone nearby Nevel in Pskov region, where he was killed.

Vladimir Petrovich Stavsky is interred in Velikiye Luki, where one of the streets bears his name.

== Bibliography ==
- Passed By (Proshli, Прошли, 1924, documentary prose)
- Stanitsa (Станица, 1928, short novel)
- The Take-Off (Razbeg, Разбег, 1932, short novel)
- On the Crest (Na Grebne, На гребне, 1932, short novel)
- Stronger Than Death (Silneye smerti, Сильнее смерти, 1932, short stories)
- The Attack (Атака, 1933, short stories)
- Fighting for Motherland (V boyakh za Rodinu, В боях за Родину, 1941)
- Frontline Notes (Frontovye zapiski, Фронтовые записки, 1942)
- On the Fronts of the Patriotic War (Na frontakh Otechestvennoi voiny, На фронтах Отечественной войны, 1942)
- In the Dug-Out (V blindazhe, В блиндаже, 1942)
- The Kuban Notes (Kubanskiye zapiski, 1955, posthumous)
