= Grace Lumpkin =

American writer

- Born: March 3, 1891; Milledgeville, Georgia, U.S.
- Died: March 23, 1980 (aged 89); Columbia, South Carolina, U.S.
- Education: Brenau College
- Occupations: Writer, novelist
- Spouse: Michael Intrator (div.)
- Relatives: Katharine DuPre Lumpkin (sister)
- Writing career
- Language: English
- Period: 1930s, 1960s
- Genres: Proletarian literature, Feminist literature
- Subject: American social injustices
- Notable work: To Make My Bread (1932)
- Notable awards: Gorky Prize (1933), South Carolina Academy of Authors (1996)

Grace Lumpkin (March 3, 1891 – March 23, 1980) was an American writer of proletarian literature who focused most of her works on the Depression era and the rise and fall of communism in the United States. The most important of four books was her first, To Make My Bread (1932), which won the Gorky Prize in 1933.

== Biography ==
=== Early life ===
Grace Lumpkin was born on March 3, 1891, in Milledgeville, Georgia, the ninth of eleven children born to Annette Caroline Morris and William Wallace Lumpkin. In 1898 she moved with her family to South Carolina. She grew up in a very religious, prominent but economically unstable aristocratic Georgian family. There were seven siblings, who by birth order were Elizabeth (teacher), Hope (clergyman), Alva (politician), Morris (lawyer), Grace (writer), and Katharine (academic).

In around 1910, William moved his family one final time, to a farm in Richland County. While in South Carolina, Grace witnessed first-hand the suffering of black and white sharecroppers and laborers. Black laborers performed fieldwork on the Lumpkin family farm, and the Lumpkin children attended school with white children from the "poorest classes". Just three months after the family began to farm, her father died and the family's financial health suffered.

Lumpkin worked at a variety of jobs before graduating from Brenau College in Gainesville, Georgia in 1911. At Brenau, she was a member of Phi Mu and she wrote the author of the Phi Mu Creed. She volunteered in France for a year, and then returned to Georgia. In Georgia she worked for the YMCA, eventually organized an adult night school for farmers and their wives, and worked at home as a demonstration agent. During most of the summers she lived in the mountains of North Carolina, staying with mill workers, sharecroppers, and other laborers, which convinced her that these workers could better their lives only by means of trade unions. Her stay in the mountains introduced her to the families about which she wrote in her first novel.

=== Communist years ===
Lumpkin had been publishing stories in college and other school magazines since 1908, but it was not until her mother's death, in 1925, that she decided to take seriously her career as a writer. Lumpkin moved to New York City when she was twenty-five and began to write short stories, becoming involved in liberal and radical politics. In the fall of 1925 she was hired as a member of the office staff at The World Tomorrow, one of the best selling magazines in New York. There she met Esther Shemitz, with whom she became lifelong friends. (Shemitz married Whittaker Chambers.) In 1926 she walked the picket lines with Passaic textile strikers and wrote about it for New Masses.

In 1927 Lumpkin was arrested at a picket sponsored by the Sacco and Vanzetti Defense Committee. She joined the staff of the New Masses in 1929, where she worked for "about a year and a half." In 1929 she was sent to the south by the Communist Party to organize among black sharecroppers and to observe and participate in the Communist-led Gastonia textile strikes.

Lumpkin first met Michael Intrator, a close friend of Chambers, who was very involved in the Communist movement, in the late 1920s. She and Intrator eventually became lovers. His expulsion from the Communist Party in 1929 brought a strain to their relationship as Grace remained part of the Communist milieu until the late 1930s. Lumpkin and Intrator married in 1931. The toughest crisis Lumpkin experienced (mid- to late-1930s) was her pregnancy with Intrator's child and decision to have an abortion, which she regretted, followed soon afterwards by divorce.

In the 1930s, Lumpkin's literary agent was Maxim Lieber, whom Chambers later named as part of his spy ring during that same period. Close to the time of Chambers' defection from the Soviet underground (April 1938), Lumpkin began rejecting Communist Party functions; soon she became actively anti-Communist.

During her time with New Masses, Lumpkin associated herself with a circle of Southern women writers who used literature for labor activism and social critique. Scholars note that writers like Lumpkin, her sister Katharine DuPre Lumpkin, and contemporaries in the radical literary movement used firsthand knowledge of Southern working-class life with emerging feminist and leftist politics. Their work collectively formed what historian Jacquelyn Dowd Hall describes as the “Southern Front,” a network of women whose fiction challenged economic inequality, racial hierarchies, and traditional gender roles.

=== Later years ===
Lumpkin became concerned with righting what she saw as her earlier political wrong and returned to the teachings of the Bible. She became a frequent speaker in churches and joined the anti-Communist Christians.

On April 2, 1953, Lumpkin testified before the Permanent Subcommittee of Investigations of the Senate Committee on Government Operations. She was then living on Gramercy Park in New York City and working as a proofreader for a printing firm called the Golden Eagle Press. Asked about her affiliations in the 1930s, she replied, "I was under the influence and the discipline of the Communist movement, although I was not a member" and that she had taken part in "faction meetings and cell meetings."

Asked about why she broke away from the party's influence, she described the following incident.

Once I was down with a Communist organizer in Alabama. I was staying with sharecroppers down there. We were organizing the Negro sharecroppers. For some reason, there had been some trouble, and a deputy sheriff was patrolling the road outside of the home of these Negroes. I believed in helping the Negro race. I believe in helping them to help themselves, because they are God's children, as important as I am. That is what I believe now.

But the Communist organizer ordered me to go out and slap the deputy sheriff in the face. He said as a result of that I would be arrested, and as a way of trying to get me to do that, he said, "Now, your picture will appear in all the newspapers all over the country, and you will sell a lot more of your books." That was an added inducement.

I felt that the situation was tense enough without doing something to bring a worse situation about, and I refused to do it. I mean, there are certain things like that, that I would not submit to Communist discipline about. And so, when this book came along, they had known such things about me, so that I was called to the New Masses office...

Joshua Kunitz was the head editor. He had me in the office, and they said, "You are writing a new novel, and we want to tell you that if this novel has anything against the party line in it... We will break you as a writer. We have people in strategic positions on magazines, on papers, who will write reviews of your books..."

Lumpkin devoted all later writings to criticism of Communism. She continued writing and lecturing and kept her strong tie to the church until death. She died in 1980 in Columbia, South Carolina.

In 2012, Lumpkin appeared as a character in Walt Larimore's novels Hazel Creek and Sugar Fork.

== Awards ==
- Gorky Prize (1933)
- Posthumous induction into South Carolina Academy of Authors (1996)

== Works ==
Books:

- To Make My Bread (1932). Tells the story of a family of Appalachian mountaineers who find themselves drawn to a mill town near their family plot after suffering great economic adversity. Soon, all the characters become involved in the politics surrounding the exploitation of labor workers. Lumpkin based her work on the Gastonia textile strike of 1929 at Loray Mill, one of the most important labor strikes in United States history. Also considered an examination of cultural and feminist history during the Depression, Lumpkin's novel addresses many of the stratifications between class and race. The novel won the Gorky Prize in 1933.
  - Notre règne arrivera (2014)
- A Sign for Cain (1935). The novel follows an African-American protagonist, Dennis, who dreams of organizing workers of all skin colors in order to stand together against business owners and others who wish to control them, regardless of race. A Sign for Cain focuses on the struggle between newly freed blacks and their old owners. Issues with sharecropping and land ownership impact both races represented and talk of a social uprising has tones of communist revolution, a theme then emerging more prevalently in Lumpkin's own life. Lumpkin realized the influence the Communist Party had over her writing, and even claimed that the strong implications evident in her text were driven by her mentors in the party. Maxim Lieber served as her literary agent in 1935.
- The Wedding (1939). The storyline follows the marriage ceremony of Jennie Middleton, the daughter of an aristocratic family that has ended up in ruin. The novel is set in 1909 and the families involved live strictly by the code of the Confederacy. Jennie's groom is Dr. Gregg, a new member of the community, having moved to town due to its rising industrialization. The wedding is almost put on hold after a heated argument and it is only after her mother, father, and Gregg's friend act as peacemakers that it continues. Jennie conforms to society's demands, having stood her ground for the last time against a marriage in which she has little emotional relation with the doctor.
- Full Circle (1962). Lumpkin's final novel explores her changing ideas regarding communism. She uses the case of the Scottsboro Boys, and the characters involved, as an exposé of the "evils of Communism". The main character, Arnie Braxton, and her mother are slowly tempted into the world of Communist Party politics. Soon the two women find themselves rejecting bourgeois illusions, allowing the sacrilege of a Christ figurine and deserting the rest of their family. Eventually, Arnie is ejected from the Communist Party for racial prejudice. Throughout the text, Lumpkin describes the Communist Party in stark terms and addresses her novel towards Southern issues.

Articles:

- "White Man, A Story" New Masses (September 1927)
- "'Flaming Milka's' Story," New Masses (February 1928)
- "The Law and the Spirit," National Review (May 25, 1957)

== Legacy ==
In 1935, Albert Bein adapted To Make My Bread into the play Let Freedom Ring.

Lumpkin provides modern readers with a window into the past of the building of the southern working class and the changes to its patriarchal values and women's roles. Lumpkin's writings give cultural historians and scholars an important body to consider when considering this period and the movements to which she contributed.

Beginning in the 1950s, scholars regained interest in radical "lost novels" of the 1930s. They have pointed to Lumpkin as one of the period's most influential authors. They have noted both her historical and literary accomplishments, particularly prominent as a figure in the early feminist movement and for promoting worker's rights. She has received praise for her ability to portray the process in which "external forces shape a literary work". she was only 22 when she made her first novel. Recent literary scholarship has noted Lumpkin's ideals of progressive representations of race relations and how she incorporated these into her writings. For example, the characters in To Make My Bread illustrate the importance of alliances between white and black women workers, and how these can be based on mutual understanding and need. Lumpkin shows readers that solidarity across racial and economic lines is essential for members of all groups.

Historians during the 1960s and 1970s found particular interest in whether the United States run according to competitive individualism or by cooperation and mutuality. They looked to Lumpkin's literature to study this argument.

== See also ==
- Katharine DuPre Lumpkin
- Proletarian literature
- Feminist literature
- Gastonia
- New Masses
- Whittaker Chambers
- Esther Shemitz

== Further resources ==
- New Georgia Encyclopedia
- TIME Magazine Review of Story of the Wedding (February 27, 1939)
- Root Cellar Lumpkin Family History
- Jacquelyn Dowd Hall, "Women Writers, the 'Southern Front,' and the Dialectical Imagination", Journal of Southern History 69 (February 2003):3–38
- Lee, Elizabeth Grace (2017). Pilgrims' Progress: Southern Social Activists' Journey from Christianity to Communism During the 1920s and 1930s. North Carolina State University.
- Sowinska, Suzanne. "Introduction." To Make My Bread. Alan Wald. Chicago: 2. University of Illinois Press,1995.
- Sowinska, Suzanne. "Grace Lumpkin (1891–1980)." The New Georgia Encyclopedia. Georgia Humanities Council and the University of Georgia Press. 15 October 2009. http://www.georgiaencyclopedia.org/nge/Article.jsp?path=/Literature/Fiction/Authors&id=h-2473
- "To Make My Bread." University of Illinois Press. The Board of Trustees of the University of Illinois. 15 October 2009. http://www.press.uillinois.edu/books/catalog/44dyt2qp9780252065019.html
- Miller, James A. Remembering Scottsboro: The Legacy of an Infamous Trial. Princeton University Press, 2009. https://books.google.com/books?id=qUjVbbwpNIwC&dq=Full+Circle+-+Grace+Lumpkin&pg=PA213
- "June 1929 – Strike at Loray Mill." UNC University Libraries. 19 October 2009. http://www.lib.unc.edu/ncc/ref/nchistory/jun2004/
- "Grace Lumpkin." Center for Working-Class Studies. Youngstown State University, Ohio. 14 October 2009.
- "The Wedding (Lost American Fiction)." Paper Back Swap. http://www.paperbackswap.com/book/details/9780809307678-The+Wedding+Lost+American+Fiction
- "Books: Bride's Strike." Time Magazine. 15 October 2009.
- images of Grace Lumpkin and sisters
