= Vladimir Dudintsev =

Soviet writer

- Born: 29 July 1918 Kupiansk, Ukraine
- Died: 23 July 1998 (aged 79) Moscow, Russia

Vladimir Dimitrievich Dudintsev (Russian: Влади́мир Дми́триевич Дуди́нцев, Ukrainian: Володимир Дмитрович Дудинцев; 29 July 1918 – 23 July 1998) was a Soviet writer who gained fame for his 1956 novel, Not by Bread Alone, published at the time of the Khrushchev Thaw.

Dudintsev, the son of a member of the gentry, attended law school in Moscow and fought during the Second World War. After the war, he became a reporter and writer.

Motivated by a report of Soviet apparatchiks refusing to credit a report of a deposit of nickel because Soviet dogma said it was impossible, Dudintsev wrote Not by Bread Alone, the tale of an engineer who is frustrated by bureaucrats when he attempts to bring forth his invention. The novel sparked wild enthusiasm among the Soviet population. Official reaction soon turned against the book, and Dudintsev suffered years of poverty, and was only able to publish occasional works. As the USSR tottered, in 1987, Dudintsev published a novel, The White Robes, for which he was awarded a State Prize the following year.

== Early life ==
Dudintsev was born in Kupiansk (now in Kharkiv Oblast, Ukraine). His father, a member of the gentry, served as a White Russian officer, and was executed by the Bolsheviks. Despite his paternity, he was able to be accepted into the Moscow Law Institute. In the Second World War, he rose to the rank of company commander. Wounded near Leningrad, he was demobilized and spent the remainder of the war in the military prosecutor's office. After the war, he worked for Komsomolskaya Pravda.

== Literary career ==
Dudintsev wrote a book of short stories, Among Seven Bogatyrs, which he published in 1953. Several of the stories in that book deal with an explosives team, blasting away mountainsides for a new railroad.

While travelling, Dudintsev heard a story about a worker who could not convince his superiors that he had discovered a valuable nickel deposit, because the discovery went against Soviet dogma. This became the basis of Not by Bread Alone. However, Dudintsev had great difficulty finding a publisher willing to print the novel, and the manuscript languished until Communist Party First Secretary Nikita Khrushchev delivered his Secret Speech in February 1956, attacking Stalinization. In the slightly more relaxed times which followed, Dudintsev was able to get Novy Mir to print the work. However, Khrushchev accused Dudintsev of taking "a malicious joy in describing the negative sides of Soviet life". Dudintsev was dismayed at the propaganda usage some foreign countries made from his book. Dudintsev was bitterly attacked at a meeting of the Union of Writers; the author fainted during the meeting.

After the attacks, Dudintsev was shunned by most. He was able to get two books of his stories published in 1959 and 1963, and in 1960, published a work of science fiction, A New Year's Fairy Tale. He survived from loans and gifts. In 1987, after the onset of Perestroika, he published The White Robes, a fictionalized version of the devastation which Trofim Lysenko wreaked on Soviet genetic study, and received the USSR State Prize for it the following year. He died in 1998.

== English translations ==
- Not by Bread Alone, Dutton, 1957.
- A New Year's Tale, Dutton, 1960.
- White Garments, Hutchinson, London.
