= Novy Mir =

Russian literary journal

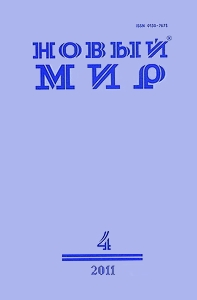
- Editor: Andrei Vasilevsky
- Categories: Literary magazine
- Frequency: Monthly
- First issue: January 1925
- Country: Russia
- Based in: Moscow
- Language: Russian

Novy Mir (Russian: Новый мир, lit. 'New World', IPA: [ˈnovɨj ˈmʲir]) is a Russian-language monthly thick journal published in Moscow since 1925. It publishes prose, poetry, essays, memoirs, literary criticism, and articles on art, science, and philosophy.

== History ==
Novy Mir has been published in Moscow since January 1925. It was modeled on the popular pre-Soviet literary magazine Mir Bozhy ("God's World"), which was published from 1892 to 1906, and its follow-up, Sovremenny Mir ("Contemporary World"), which was published from 1906 to 1917.

Before 1960, Novy Mir mainly published prose that supported the general line of the Communist Party. Ivan Gronsky became editor-in-chief of the magazine in 1931, and he began the practice of printing a portrait of Stalin and a poem to his glory in almost every issue. However, Gronsky was arrested in 1937 and replaced by Vladimir Stavsky. In the April 13, 1946, meeting of the Politburo, Joseph Stalin said Novy Mir was the USSR's worst literary magazine, beating out Zvezda for the top spot. Between 1947 and 1991, the magazine was an organ of the Union of Soviet Writers.

In the early 1960s, Novy Mir changed its political stance, leaning to a dissident position. In November 1962 the magazine became famous for publishing Aleksandr Solzhenitsyn's groundbreaking One Day in the Life of Ivan Denisovich, a novella about a prisoner of the Gulag. In the same year its circulation was about 150,000 copies a month. The magazine continued publishing controversial articles and stories about various aspects of Soviet and Russian history despite the fact that its editor-in-chief, Alexander Tvardovsky, facing significant political pressure, resigned in February 1970. With the appointment of Sergey Zalygin in 1986, at the beginning of perestroika, the magazine practised increasingly bold criticism of the Soviet government, including figures such as Mikhail Gorbachev. It also published fiction and poetry by previously banned writers, such as George Orwell, Joseph Brodsky and Vladimir Nabokov.

== Editors-in-chief ==
- Ivan Skvortsov-Stepanov (1925–1926)
- Vyacheslav Polonsky (1926–1931)
- Ivan Gronsky (1931–1937)
- Vladimir Stavsky (1937–1941)
- Vladimir Shcherbina (1941–1946)
- Konstantin Simonov (1946–1950)
- Alexander Tvardovsky (1950–1954)
- Konstantin Simonov (1954–1957)
- Alexander Tvardovsky (1958–1970)
- Valery Kosolapov (1970–1974)
- Sergei Narovchatov (1974–1981)
- Vladimir Karpov (1981–1986)
- Sergey Zalygin (1986–1998)
- Andrei Vasilevsky (1998– )

== Contemporary authors ==
Today Novy Mir is considered a leading Russian literary magazine and has a liberal orientation.

In the 2000s, the following authors have been published: Maxim Amelin, Arkadi Babchenko, Dmitry Bak, Vladimir Berezin, Dmitry Bykov, Dmitry Danilov, Vladimir Gandelsman, Alisa Ganieva, Alexander Ilichevsky, Aleksandr Karasyov, Leonid Kostyukov, Yuri Kublanovsky, Alexander Kushner, Yulia Latynina, Vladimir Makanin, Anatoly Nayman, Yevgeni Popov, Zakhar Prilepin, Valery Pustovaya, Sergey Soloukh, Andrei Volos, Oleg Yermakov and others.

== See also ==
- List of literary magazines
