= Vsevolod Meyerhold State Theatre =

Theatre in Moscow

- Государственный театр имени Вс. Мейерхольда
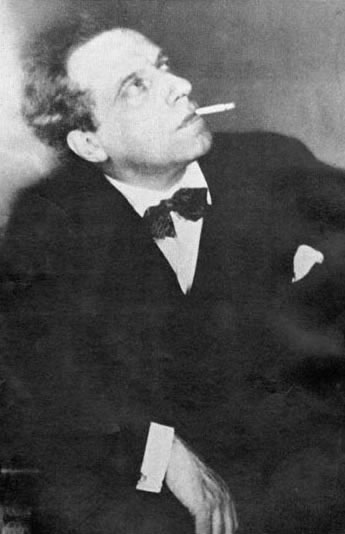
- Interactive map of Vsevolod Meyerhold State Theatre
- Address: Moscow; Soviet Union
- Coordinates: 55°46′7.68″N 37°35′46.68″E
- Owner: Soviet Union
- Operator: Vsevolod Meyerhold
- Type: Drama theatre

Construction
- Opened: 1920
- Closed: January 8, 1938

The Vsevolod Meyerhold State Theatre (GOSTIM, GosTiM, TiM; Russian: Государственный театр имени Вс. Мейерхольда (ГОСТИМ, ГосТиМ, ТиМ)) was a drama theatre in Moscow, Soviet Union that operated under various names from 1920 to 1938.

Throughout its entire 18-year existence, the theatre was headed by Vsevolod Meyerhold, a pupil of Konstantin Stanislavski and Vladimir Nemirovich-Danchenko. A former actor of the Moscow Art Theatre, Meyerhold had parted ways with the artistic views of his teachers as early as the beginning of the 20th century.

In early 1938, GosTiM was declared incompatible with Soviet art and the Soviet audience and was subsequently closed. Soon afterward, Meyerhold himself became a victim of political repression. Following the director's rehabilitation in 1955, his theatre was rehabilitated as well.

== Background ==
After graduating from the Music and Drama School under the direction of Vladimir Nemirovich-Danchenko in 1898, Vsevolod Meyerhold was invited to join the company of the newly established Moscow Art Theatre. He took part in its earliest—and later legendary—productions, portraying Vasili Shuisky in Feodor I of Russia, Treplev in The Seagull, and later becoming the first actor to perform the role of Tuzenbach in Three Sisters. Drawn increasingly to directing, Meyerhold left the Moscow Art Theatre in 1902 and formed his own troupe, with which he toured the southern cities of the Russian Empire, initially continuing the traditions of the Art Theatre.

Beginning with productions of plays by Anton Chekhov and Maxim Gorky, Meyerhold became increasingly interested in the repertoire of modernism, which prompted his search for new means of theatrical expression. In 1905, he was appointed head of the experimental Studio on Povarskaya Street, established at the initiative of Stanislavski. Inspired by Symbolist aesthetics, Meyerhold formulated the programme of a conventionally aesthetic theatre, emphasizing stylization and the subordination of stage action to musical and visual design.

Stanislavski soon became disillusioned with the studio, whose credo, in his words, amounted to the belief that "realism and everyday life had outlived their time". Meyerhold, however, from 1906 onward staged productions at various theatres, including the Alexandrinsky and Mariinsky theatres. His subsequent artistic explorations were associated with "theatrical traditionalism", drawing upon the experience of medieval theatre and the art of histrions. All of Meyerhold's experiments constituted a protest against what he regarded as derivative naturalism, which in his view was "bourgeois and philistine". He came to conceive of theatrical performance as a festive spectacle while at the same time gravitating toward the tragic grotesque, which, he believed, should be rooted in the traditions of popular fairground entertainment.

Meyerhold greeted—and immediately embraced—the October Revolution with these ideas already fully formed. He marked the first anniversary of the Revolution with a production of Vladimir Mayakovsky's Mystery-Bouffe in Petrograd, a work that perfectly corresponded to his conception of mass spectacle.

== From the RSFSR Theatre to the Russian Institute of Theatre Arts (GITIS) ==
In 1920, Meyerhold, then head of the Theatre Department of the People's Commissariat for Education, founded a theatre in Moscow known as the First RSFSR Theatre. The new company was granted the building at 20 Bolshaya Sadovaya Street, which had belonged to the Theatre of the Artistic and Educational Union of Workers' Organizations. Since 1919, that theatre had been headed by Valery Bebutov, whose artistic pursuits closely aligned with those of Meyerhold. In early 1920, the theatre was dissolved, and a significant portion of its troupe, led by Bebutov himself, joined Meyerhold's company. Among Bebutov's students were Maria Babanova, Mikhail Zharov, and Igor Ilyinsky.

The new theatre, which adopted the slogan of combating political neutrality in theatrical art, opened on 7 November 1920 with a production of Dawns (Zori) by Émile Verhaeren. Both this production and the subsequent staging of Vladimir Mayakovsky's Mystery-Bouffe, presented to the public on 1 May 1921, fully embodied the programme of Theatrical October, which Meyerhold had first advanced in 1918 and which called for the creation of a vividly spectacular theatre of political agitation.

In his productions, Meyerhold sought to establish direct contact with the audience. In Dawns, for example, Red Army soldiers participated in the performance with their banners and military bands, while reports of victories from the fronts of the Russian Civil War were announced during the action. In Mystery-Bouffe, there was no curtain, and part of the action was moved into the auditorium, effectively merging the stage with the audience space.

== Workshops ==
The Higher Directing Workshops were established under the First RSFSR Theatre and soon acquired the status of State Higher Directing Workshops (GVYRM). Enrollment began in the summer of 1921. According to the memoirs of Erast Garin, the Workshops consisted of two departments—directing and acting. Although students were formally divided into "actors" and "directors", they were required to attend classes in both departments.

At the Workshops, Meyerhold, who was critical of Stanislavski's system, trained actors for his theatre according to his own methods, including instruction in biomechanics. In accordance with Meyerhold's original conception, an actor was not meant to portray an individual "character" but rather a generalized type and, in the context of his revolutionary productions, to embody class consciousness rather than individual psychology.

More than eighty students were admitted to the first class, including Sergei Eisenstein, Nikolai Ekk, Sergei Yutkevich, Vladimir Lyutse, Vasily Fyodorov, Zinaida Reich, and Alexei Kelberer.

== Actor's Theatre ==
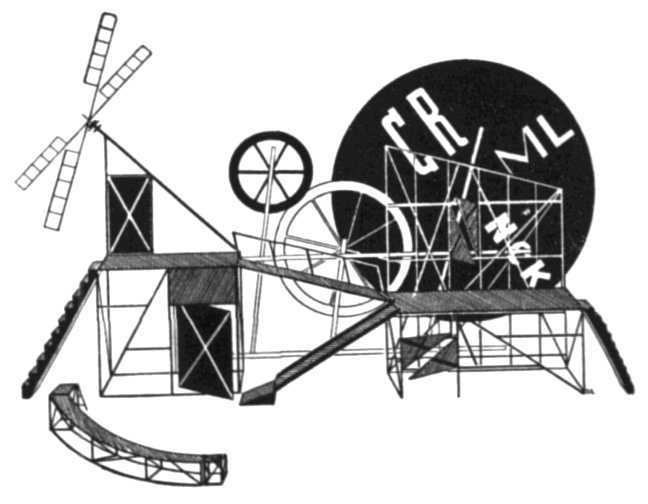
The Theatrical Structure of the Play "Le Cocu magnifique"

In 1921, the First RSFSR Theatre met the fate of many young theatrical companies of the period: it was closed as financially unviable, and the troupe gave its final performance on 10 September. Meyerhold subsequently established the so-called Free Workshop of Vsevolod Meyerhold within his Directing Workshops, which absorbed a group of actors from the First RSFSR Theatre, including Vasily Zaichikov, Dmitry Orlov (actor), Alexei Temerin, and Grigori Roshal. In the spring of 1922, the State Higher Theatre Workshops were established, incorporating the GVYRM. The Free Workshop, in turn, merged with the troupe of Konstantin Nezlobin—whose theatre had earlier been renamed the Second RSFSR Theatre by Meyerhold and had likewise been closed in December 1921—to form the Actor's Theatre under the auspices of the new institution.

The new theatre occupied the same premises at 20 Bolshaya Sadovaya Street, near Triumfalnaya Square, and formally opened on 20 April with a production of A Doll's House by Henrik Ibsen, which Meyerhold hastily staged using Nezlobin's troupe. The production proved unsuccessful and was performed only three times. The theatre's effective opening took place on 25 April 1922, when audiences were presented with Le Cocu magnifique by Fernand Crommelynck.

By staging the play as a tragicomedy, Meyerhold avoided the coarseness of the literary original. Dedicated to Molière, the production proved remarkably vivid despite its sparse stage design and the absence of theatrical costumes: the actors performed in Blue Blouses and bell-bottom trousers, without makeup or wigs. For contemporary audiences, the production, despite its very different methods, invited comparisons with Yevgeny Vakhtangov's Princess Turandot.

In this production, Meyerhold employed constructivist stage structures in place of conventional scenery for the first time. These subsequently became a hallmark of his productions, serving practical and functional purposes in deliberate contrast to the pictorial illusionism of traditional theatre.

The success of Le Cocu magnifique, which inaugurated the era of constructivism in Soviet theatre, weakened the position of Konstantin Nezlobin. His troupe eventually disbanded, and he ultimately resigned from the theatre.

With this production, we sought to lay the foundations for a new form of theatrical performance—one that would require neither illusionistic scenery nor elaborate props, relying instead on the simplest everyday objects, and that would evolve from a spectacle performed by specialists into a free-form activity enjoyed by working people during their leisure time.

— Vsevolod Meyerhold, "The Magnanimous Cuckold"

== GITIS Theatre ==
In the summer of 1922, the merger of Meyerhold's Workshops with the State Institute of Musical Drama resulted in the formation of the Russian Institute of Theatre Arts (GITIS). Among those admitted to the Acting Faculty were A. Ya. Moskalyova, N. I. Tverdynskaya, N. I. Bogolyubov, and Lev Sverdlin, all of whom later became actors in Meyerhold's theatre. Students of the Directing Faculty who would subsequently associate their careers with Meyerhold included Nikolay Okhlopkov, Alexander Fevralsky, Pavel Tsetnerovich, and Ilya Shlepyanov.

Meyerhold's Free Workshop, in turn, merged with the Experimental Heroic Theatre of Boris Ferdinandov to form the GITIS Theatre, which opened on 1 October 1922 with a performance of Le Cocu magnifique. However, the theatre proved short-lived.

At the GITIS Theatre, Meyerhold, together with his assistant director Sergei Eisenstein, staged one of his favourite plays, The Death of Tarelkin by Aleksandr Sukhovo-Kobylin. "Throughout the performance," wrote Vasily Sakhnovsky, "the audience was confronted by Meyerhold's sorrowful eyes gazing out from the depths of darkness. The tragic picture of Russian reality convulsively writhed within the fairground and circus-like form of the production."

Before long, however, disagreements emerged within GITIS itself, leading to a split.

== Repertoire ==
- 1920 — Dawns by Émile Verhaeren; directed by Vsevolod Meyerhold and Valery Bebutov; sets designed by Vladimir Dmitriev (artist).
- 1921 — Mystery-Bouffe by Vladimir Mayakovsky (second version); directed by Vsevolod Meyerhold and Valery Bebutov; designed by Anton Lavinsky, V. L. Khrakovsky, and Viktor Kiselyov.
- 1921 — The League of Youth by Henrik Ibsen; directed by Vsevolod Meyerhold (revived in 1922 at the Actor's Theatre under the title Stensgaard's Adventure, or The League of Youth).
- 1922 — A Doll's House by Henrik Ibsen; directed by Vsevolod Meyerhold.
- 1922 — Le Cocu magnifique by Fernand Crommelynck; directed by Vsevolod Meyerhold; designed by Lyubov Popova and Vladimir Lyutse. Cast: Bruno — Igor Ilyinsky; Stella — Maria Babanova; Estrugo — Vasily Zaichikov.
- 1922 — The Death of Tarelkin by Aleksandr Sukhovo-Kobylin; staged by Vsevolod Meyerhold and directed by Sergei Eisenstein. Cast: Tarelkin — Vasily Zaichikov and Max Tereshkovich; Varravin — Mikhail Lishin; Rasplyuyev — Dmitry Orlov (actor); Brandakhlystov — Mikhail Zharov; Kachala — Nikolay Okhlopkov; Shatala — N. V. Sibiryak and Pavel Tsetnerovich; Vanichka — Erast Garin; Brandakhlystova's children — E. B. Bengis and Vladimir Lyutse; Dr. Unmöglichkeit — Vladimir Kantsel and Alexei Kelberer.

== TiM and GosTiM ==
=== 1920s ===
At the very end of 1922, Meyerhold, together with his students—directing students and a portion of the acting students—left GITIS. A new educational institution, the Vsevolod Meyerhold Workshop, was established and later reorganized into the State Experimental Theatre Workshop (GEKTEMAS). The GITIS Theatre remained under Meyerhold's control and, in 1923, was renamed the Meyerhold Theatre (TiM).

In its new capacity, the theatre opened on 4 March with Earth on End (Zemlya Dybom), based on a play by Sergei Tretyakov, itself an adaptation of Marcel Martinet's play Night. Conceived as a topical political revue marking the fifth anniversary of the Red Army, the production made use of real motorcycles, bicycles, an automobile, a machine gun, a field kitchen, and even a harvesting machine. “Motorcycles and automobiles, roaring and rattling, rolled through the auditorium onto the stage,” recalled an eyewitness, creating a stunning effect. According to Em. Beskov, the production, fully living up to its title, turned the theatre upside down.

To obtain the military equipment required for the production, Meyerhold had to appeal personally to Leon Trotsky. The performance was dedicated both to him and to the Red Army. In the autumn of 1923, however, Meyerhold found himself compelled to ask Trotsky to reaffirm the order authorizing the provision of military equipment to the theatre, which was “supported by no one except you.” These circumstances would later be recalled during the campaign against him in December 1937.

Nevertheless, Meyerhold's theatre gradually gained support not only from audiences but also from official institutions. This was facilitated in part by TiM's patronage of various military units, educational institutions, and, above all, army clubs. Its actors, many of whom had themselves come through amateur military theatre groups, frequently worked as instructors in drama clubs. In 1926, TiM was granted state status and became GosTiM (or GOSTIM).

=== Actors, Directors, and Designers ===
On the one hand, Meyerhold sought to cultivate in his workshop’s actors with strong individual personalities who were capable of thinking like directors. During rehearsals, he readily accepted performers' creative contributions (despite his reputation as a “despot”), which, according to David Zolotnitsky, explains why so many prominent artistic personalities emerged from among his students. On the other hand, throughout its history, unlike most other theatres, TiM's productions were staged exclusively by its artistic director. Directors trained by Meyerhold could, at best, stage productions alongside him and under his supervision. Lacking opportunities for independent creative development, they generally left the theatre after a short time. Bebutov left Meyerhold's circle as early as 1922, and in 1923 a group of young actors led by Vladimir Lyutse formed the so-called “Theatre of Free Masters” and embarked on tours of the provinces, promoting the new revolutionary art while enjoying creative independence. At various times, Leonid Varpakhovsky, Boris Ravenskikh, Vasily Fyodorov, Pavel Tsetnerovich, Ilya Shlepyanov, Valentin Pluchek, and Nikolai Ekk worked at Meyerhold's theatre; however, like Lutse, none of them established themselves as directors within TiM itself.

Actors, too, had their own reasons for leaving. “Meyerhold was not a theatre pedagogue,” wrote Boris Alpers. “He did not know how—or perhaps did not wish—to teach his studio students the craft of acting... Whenever possible, Meyerhold demanded that actors reproduce his demonstrations exactly. His later rehearsals are well known for turning into a kind of performance, with Meyerhold himself playing the leading role through his improvisations.”

The situation was different with designers. Meyerhold's theatre collaborated with Vladimir Dmitriev (artist), Pyotr Vilyams, Aleksandr Deyneka, Alexander Rodchenko, and Kukryniksy. Meyerhold also frequently discovered scenographic talent among his own students. V. Lutse, I. Shlepyanov, and V. Fyodorov later became directors and often designed their own productions as well.

=== Productions ===
During the first half of the 1920s, TiM, like other theatres, suffered from a shortage of contemporary Soviet drama. As a result, it was forced to stage mainly translated plays, often heavily adapted, or to modernize works of the Russian classical repertoire. Thus, in 1924, Meyerhold staged The Forest by Alexander Ostrovsky in the style of the satirical revues popular at the time. Such revues effectively compensated for the lack of plays dealing with contemporary issues. In Meyerhold's production, the landowner Gurmyzhskaya was transformed into a NEPwoman, the merchant Vosmibratov into a kulak, and the dandyish landowner Milonov into a priest; specially written scenes were also added to Ostrovsky's original text. Like all of Meyerhold's productions of the period, The Forest left no one indifferent: some admired its wit and originality, while others were outraged by what they regarded as a sacrilegiously free treatment of a classic work.

Even a cursory examination of the activities of Meyerhold’s theatre soon makes it clear that theory was the least interesting aspect of its work, and that terms such as “biomechanics” and the like were of only the most secondary importance.

— A. V. Lunacharsky

Similar controversies—and the same accusations of desecrating the classics—surrounded Meyerhold's production of The Government Inspector by Nikolai Gogol, staged two years later. Although the action was not transferred to the twentieth century, the production introduced scenes and characters absent from the original play. Contrary to the established Russian theatrical tradition of presenting Gogol's comedy as a vaudeville, Meyerhold interpreted The Government Inspector as a tragicomedy or, in the words of one critic, a “tragedy-bouffe”. In the famous “silent scene” at the end of the play, the characters frozen in terror were represented not by actors but by life-sized mannequins. The same device was later employed in a 1999 production of The Government Inspector at the Comédie-Française. According to Konstantin Stanislavski, Meyerhold's production had “turned Gogol into Hoffmann”. The production was defended by the People's Commissar of Education, Anatoly Lunacharsky, who considered The Government Inspector “Meyerhold's most convincing production” up to that time. “I am very pleased,” he wrote a year after the premiere, “that the public's appreciation of this production continues to grow from performance to performance, and that recent performances have ended amid enthusiastic ovations.”

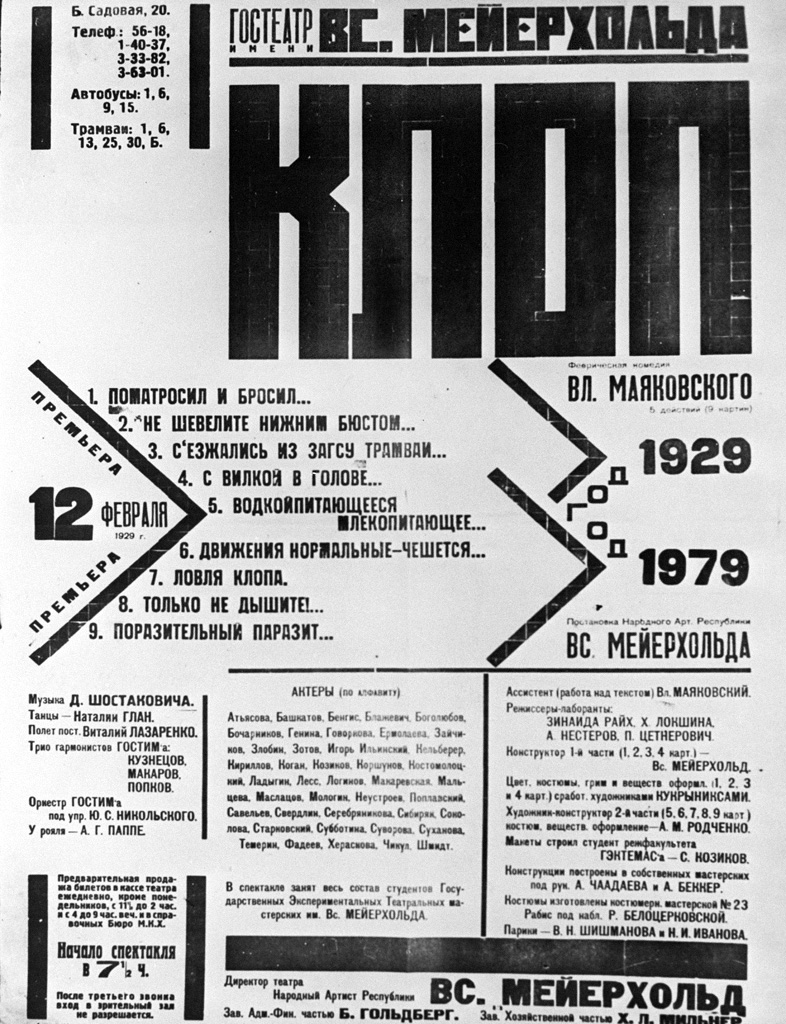

Meyerhold's 1928 production Woe to Wit (Gore umu) combined elements from various editions and manuscript versions of Alexander Griboyedov's comedy Woe from Wit. From the earliest version of the text, Meyerhold borrowed the title Woe to Wit, which better suited his interpretation of the play as a tragicomedy—indeed, more a tragedy than a comedy. “The settling of accounts with the past,” wrote David Zolotnitsky, “no longer inspired Meyerhold as it once had, and the satirical edge occasionally wavered within a magnetic field of associations.” The production, which ended on a melancholy note, proved uneven: directorial insights that secured its lasting reputation coexisted with shortcomings that led some critics to claim that Meyerhold had exhausted his creative potential.

This judgment was refuted by Meyerhold's 1929 production of The Bedbug by Vladimir Mayakovsky. Sharp, provocative, and thoroughly polemical—the director and playwright simultaneously engaged in often acrimonious disputes with colleagues and critics—the production was destined to become a landmark in the history of Soviet theatre. Following its premiere on 13 February, it was performed almost daily to sold-out audiences until the end of the season on 16 May. The theatrical press, however, was far less enthusiastic. Most criticism was directed at the playwright rather than the production itself, and even hostile reviewers generally acknowledged the merits of Meyerhold's direction.

In 1928, the theatre came close to being dissolved. Meyerhold, who had travelled abroad for medical treatment and to negotiate foreign tours for GosTiM, prolonged his stay in France. As Michael Chekhov, then director of the Second Moscow Art Theatre (MKhAT-2), and Aleksey Granovsky, head of the Moscow State Jewish Theatre (GOSET), had also failed to return from trips abroad during the same period, Meyerhold likewise came under suspicion of intending not to return to the Soviet Union. Anatoly Lunacharsky informed a correspondent of the Russian Telegraph Agency (ROSTA) that GosTiM would be disbanded, and the Art Administration established a liquidation commission. Meyerhold did return, however, and plans to dissolve the theatre were subsequently abandoned.

=== Selected repertoire ===
- 1923 — Earth Rampant by Martinet and Sergei Tretyakov. Directed by Vsevolod Meyerhold; designed by Lyubov Popova.
- 1924 — D.E. (A Theatrical Adaptation), adapted by Podgayetsky from a work by Ilya Ehrenburg. Directed by Vsevolod Meyerhold; designed by Ilya Shlepyanov and Vasily Fyodorov.
- 1924 — Teacher Bubus by Alexei Faiko. Directed by Vsevolod Meyerhold; designed by Ilya Shlepyanov.
- 1924 — The Forest by Alexander Ostrovsky. Directed by Vsevolod Meyerhold; designed by Vasily Fyodorov. Cast: Gurmyzhskaya — Yelena Tyapkina and N. I. Tverdynskaya; Aksyusha — Zinaida Reich; Vosmibratov — Boris Zakhava; Pyotr — Nikolay Bogolyubov; Bulanov — Alexei Kelberer; Neschastlivtsev — Mikhail Mukhin (actor); Schastlivtsev — Igor Ilyinsky; Ulita — V. F. Remizova.
- 1925 — The Mandate by Nikolai Erdman. Directed by Vsevolod Meyerhold; designed by Ilya Shlepyanov and P. V. Williams.
- 1926 — The Government Inspector by Nikolai Gogol. Directed by Vsevolod Meyerhold; designed by Vladimir Dmitriev (artist), Viktor Kiselyov, V. E. Meyerhold, and Ilya Shlepyanov. Cast: Khlestakov — Erast Garin and Sergey Martinson; the Mayor — Pyotr Starkovsky; Anna Andreyevna — Zinaida Reich; Marya Antonovna — Maria Babanova; the Judge — N. V. Karabanov; Khlopov — A. V. Loginov; Zemlyanika — V. F. Zaychikov; Gibner — Alexei Temerin.
- 1926 — Roar, China! by Sergei Tretyakov. Directed by Vsevolod Meyerhold and assistant director Vasily Fyodorov; designed by Sergei Yefimenko.
- 1927 — A Window into the Village by R. M. Akulshin. Directed by Vsevolod Meyerhold; designed by V. A. Shestakov.
- 1928 — Woe to Reason, based on Alexander Griboyedov's comedy Woe from Wit. Directed by Vsevolod Meyerhold; designed by Nikolai Ulyanov; music by Boris Asafyev. Cast: Chatsky — Erast Garin; Famusov — Igor Ilyinsky; Sofia — Zinaida Reich; Molchalin — Mikhail Mukhin (actor); Skalozub — Daniil Sagal; Zagoretsky — Vasily Zaychikov; Repetilov — N. V. Sibiryak. Additional music by Anatoly Pappe.
- 1929 — The Bedbug by Vladimir Mayakovsky. Directed by Vsevolod Meyerhold; designed by Kukryniksy and Alexander Rodchenko; music by Dmitri Shostakovich. Igor Ilyinsky played Prisypkin, and Alexei Temerin played Bayan.
- 1929 — Commander-2 by Ilya Selvinsky. Directed by Vsevolod Meyerhold; designed by V. V. Pochitalov; stage construction by Sergei Vakhtangov. Cast: Chub — N. I. Bogolyubov; Okonny — F. P. Korshunov; Deverin — S. S. Fadeyev; Vera — Z. N. Reich.

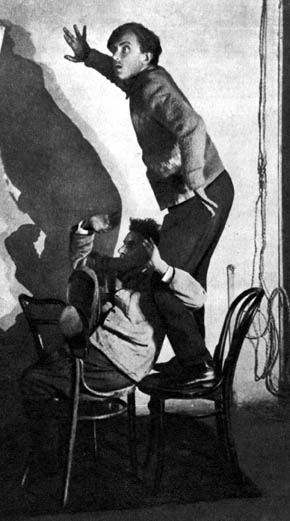
Vs. Meyerhold and Erast Garin (Khlestakov) posing during a rehearsal for The Government Inspector (1926). Photo by Alexey Temerin

=== The 1930s ===
By the late 1920s, Meyerhold was already being criticized for the lack of Soviet plays in his theatre's repertoire. Soviet drama had come into its own, and all theatres, including the conservative Moscow Art Theatre (MAT) and the Maly Theatre, were staging plays by Konstantin Trenyov, Boris Lavrenyov, Vsevolod Ivanov, Alexei Faiko, and others. Much of the new drama, however, was ill-suited to the style of the Meyerhold Theatre (GosTiM), as were the plays of Maxim Gorky, whose works enjoyed a surge in popularity after 1932. Meyerhold's principal playwrights were Vladimir Mayakovsky and Nikolai Erdman, whose productions at GosTiM stood alongside the comedies of Gogol and Griboyedov. Neither playwright, however, was especially prolific, and their works were not always favourably received by Party officials. As a result, a considerable number of less distinguished plays found their way into the theatre's repertoire. At the same time, beginning in the late 1920s, Meyerhold gradually moved away from the poster-like style of his earlier productions, notably in The Bedbug and Commander-2.

Meyerhold's eccentric and sharply polemical productions provoked constant debate and often met with irritation or outright rejection. Diverse in style, they invariably displeased someone. Mayakovsky, for example, described as a "barbarity" the appearance of Red Army soldiers and sailors on stage in D.E. (Give Us Europe!); the Russian Association of Proletarian Writers (RAPP), by contrast, regarded the productions of The Government Inspector and Woe from Wit as a betrayal of the principles of "Theatrical October". Even Ernst Toller, after attending rehearsals for The Government Inspector, complained to Lunacharsky that Meyerhold had finally "descended into naturalism". Lunacharsky himself disliked the enthusiastically acclaimed Le Cocu magnifique: to this admirer of the Grand Guignol, the production seemed "extremely crude", while its design appeared "artistically unjustified". Yet in 1927, in connection with Meyerhold's production of The Government Inspector, the People's Commissar of Education wrote: "Beginning with The Forest, I sensed a salutary turning point in Meyerhold's work. This sensitive man has begun to understand that innovations and theatrical tricks, the talented but mischievous destruction of the old theatre at any cost—however admirable they may be—are far from what our public needs as much as bread."

Meanwhile, the Party leadership grew increasingly dissatisfied with Meyerhold's satirical productions. In 1930, Mayakovsky's The Bathhouse was banned and removed from the repertoire, and in 1932 Meyerhold's production of The Suicide by Nikolai Erdman was prohibited at the dress-rehearsal stage One of Meyerhold's least controversial productions had been Erdman's The Mandate, staged in 1925 and performed more than 350 times. Times changed, however, and by the early 1930s attitudes toward The Mandate had also shifted. Even decades later, critics continued to note with disapproval the "tragic perception of the collapse of individualist ideology" in certain GosTiM productions. This criticism applied to Commander-2, in which the conflict between two Civil War commanders was interpreted by some as reflecting Stalin's struggle against Trotsky.

Nevertheless, Meyerhold's finest productions remained in the repertoire for many years, accumulating hundreds of performances and exerting a profound influence on the development of Soviet theatre. Their impact extended beyond the Soviet Union. Following GosTiM's foreign tour in 1930, its work became well known in both Germany and France. Between April and June 1930, the company visited nine German cities, including Berlin, where it presented three productions: The Forest, The Government Inspector, and Roar, China!. Bertolt Brecht, who at the time was developing political theatre in Germany both in collaboration with and independently of Erwin Piscator, observed that GosTiM possessed "a genuine theory of the social function of theatre". He also criticized German reviewers, who remained indifferent to "the historical place of Meyerhold's experiment among attempts to create a great, more rational theatre", as well as to "the magnificent way in which every concept has been put in its proper place".

=== Productions ===
The Bathhouse by Vladimir Mayakovsky, first presented on 16 March 1930, was as programmatic a production for GosTiM as The Government Inspector, Woe from Wit, and The Bedbug. Published before its stage premiere, Mayakovsky's play sparked heated controversy in the press. Vladimir Yermilov, one of the leading ideologues of the Russian Association of Proletarian Writers (RAPP), argued that the theme of Red tape was no longer relevant; had Pobedonosikov embodied the "Right Deviation", he suggested, the play would have been more timely. Following the success of Aleksandr Bezymensky's The Shot, which was performed 100 times within a single year, the premiere of The Bathhouse was regarded by many as a disappointment. "The audience," Mayakovsky wrote, "was divided to a ridiculous degree: some said they had never been so bored; others, that they had never laughed so much." Critics were equally divided, identifying entirely different—and often contradictory—shortcomings in the production. As before, most criticisms were directed at the play itself and had already been voiced in connection with its Leningrad production by Vladimir Lyutse. The principal objection could be summed up in a few words: "Where are the Communists? Where are the workers?" Yermilov's fears, however, proved unfounded. The production turned out to be even more biting than expected—ultimately leading to its removal from the repertoire—and became a landmark event in the history of Soviet theatre.

Alongside political satire, GosTiM developed a line of epic heroism from the late 1920s onward, represented above all by Ilya Selvinsky's poetic drama Commander-2—whose author was deeply dissatisfied with Meyerhold's adaptation of the text—and by Vsevolod Vishnevsky's musical play The Last Decisive One. Vishnevsky's "anti-opera", in which heroic themes were intertwined with satire, resembled a scenario intended for further development within the theatre itself. This quality discouraged other directors—no other theatre staged it—but it was precisely what attracted Meyerhold, who generally regarded any play, regardless of its author, as a blueprint for a stage production. Vishnevsky subsequently withdrew his next play, Germany, from GosTiM, dissatisfied that Meyerhold had treated it as little more than a scenario. As a result of their disagreement, Vishnevsky's finest play, An Optimistic Tragedy, was assigned to the Kamerny Theatre, much to Meyerhold's disappointment.

Reviewing Krechinsky's Wedding, which premiered during the theatre's Leningrad tour in April 1933, Adrian Piotrovsky noted what he regarded as a step forward from the productions of The Government Inspector and Woe from Wit: "an unmistakable tendency toward stage realism". "It is also noteworthy," the critic wrote, "and unusual for Meyerhold, that he handles the author's text with extraordinary restraint—although this restraint is, to a considerable extent, external. Even the most radical dramaturgical innovation—the introduction of 'reports on events', which interrupt the flow of the action—rests upon the author's original text."

From the outset, Meyerhold's theatre deliberately distanced itself from the aesthetics of the Moscow Art Theatre; the psychological realism associated with the Moscow Art Theatre was replaced by music, which always played an important role in his productions as a structural element of stage action. At times, the action itself was organized according to the principles of musical form, as in The Last Decisive One. By the mid-1930s, however, a rapprochement between Meyerhold and Konstantin Stanislavski had become apparent, most notably in The Lady of the Camellias, based on the play by Alexandre Dumas fils and staged in 1934. The very appearance of this melodrama on the GosTiM stage was unexpected; even more surprising was the clear movement toward Stanislavski's "school of experiencing" that became evident in the production.

Many contemporaries, especially Vishnevsky, regarded the production as a complete repudiation of everything Meyerhold had previously done. Alexei Gvozdev disagreed. During the ten years since the staging of The Forest, he argued, the so-called "mass audience" had become more culturally sophisticated. The former practice of directly prompting audiences toward condemnatory judgments was no longer necessary and could give way to "other methods of influence, far more subtle". Meyerhold, Gvozdev maintained, had recognized this change, whereas critics still expected him to "speak to the audience in the language of The Forest".

A reconsideration of Meyerhold's own artistic experience was also evident in his new version of Woe to Reason, staged in 1935. "Gone," wrote A. A. Gvozdev, "is the opening tavern scene depicting the nocturnal revelry of Sofia Famusova and Alexei Molchalin... In the original version, a group of Decembrists, associates of Alexander Chatsky, appeared amid the ballroom scene, alongside a 'billiard room' in which Pavel Famusov played billiards with Sergei Skalozub. The billiard room has now been removed, and this secondary motif no longer distracts attention from the central opposition between two worlds—the world of Pavel Famusov and that of Alexander Chatsky... Significant changes were also made to the production's visual design. The clutter of objects in the shooting-gallery scene disappeared, while the abstract and schematic treatment of the ballroom scene and the play's finale was abandoned. Profound changes were also introduced in the interpretation of the principal characters, especially Pavel Famusov, Alexei Molchalin, and Alexander Chatsky."

By the mid-1930s, the theatre found itself in an ambiguous position. On the one hand, a grand new building was being constructed for it at the corner of Bolshaya Sadovaya Street and Gorky Street (now the P. I. Tchaikovsky Concert Hall); on the other hand, the pejorative term "Meyerholdism" had already entered official discourse in January 1936 in the notorious article Muddle Instead of Music. That same year, Meyerhold delivered a lecture entitled "Meyerhold against Meyerholdism"; however, it saved neither the director nor his theatre.

=== Selected repertoire ===
- 1930 — The Shot by A. I. Bezymensky. Directed by V. Zaychikov, S. Kezikov, A. Nesterov, and F. Bondarenko under the supervision of Vsevolod Meyerhold; sets and costumes designed by Viktor Kalinin (architect) and Leonid Pavlov.
- 1930 — The Bathhouse by Vladimir Mayakovsky. Directed by Vsevolod Meyerhold; designed by Aleksandr Deyneka; stage construction by Sergei Vakhtangov; music by Vissarion Shebalin. Cast: Pobedonosikov — Maksim Shtraukh; Optimistenko — V. Zaychikov; Polya — M. F. Sukhanova; the Director — S. Martinson; Momentalnikov — V. Pluchek; the Phosphorescent Woman — Z. Reich.
- 1931 — The Last Decisive One by Vsevolod Vishnevsky. Directed by Vsevolod Meyerhold; constructivist staging by Sergei Vakhtangov.
- 1931 — A List of Benefits by Yury Olesha. Directed by Vsevolod Meyerhold; designed by K. K. Savitsky, V. E. Meyerhold, and I. I. Leistikov.
- 1933 — Introduction by Yuri German. Directed by Vsevolod Meyerhold; designed by Johannes Leistikov.
- 1933 — Krechinsky's Wedding by Aleksandr Sukhovo-Kobylin. Directed by Vsevolod Meyerhold; designed by Viktor Shestakov. Cast: Krechinsky — Yury Yuryev; Rasplyuyev — Igor Ilyinsky.
- 1934 — The Lady of the Camellias by Alexandre Dumas fils. Directed by Vsevolod Meyerhold; designed by I. Leistikov.
- 1935 — 33 Faints (The Proposal, The Bear, and The Jubilee by Anton Chekhov). Directed by Vsevolod Meyerhold; designed by Viktor Shestakov; music by Anatoly Pappe.

== Closure of the theatre ==
The theatre was closed by an order of the USSR Committee for Artistic Affairs under the Council of People's Commissars, issued on 7 January 1938 and entitled "On the Liquidation of the Vsevolod Meyerhold Theatre". The order was published in Pravda the following day.

The order was preceded by the publication in Pravda in December 1937 of an article by Platon Kerzhentsev, Chairman of the Committee for Artistic Affairs, entitled "An Alien Theatre". Among other accusations, Meyerhold was charged with having created within his theatre an atmosphere of "anti-social conduct, sycophancy, suppression of self-criticism, and self-adulation". The article concluded with the rhetorical question of whether such a theatre was needed by Soviet art and Soviet audiences; organized responses calling for the theatre's closure followed immediately.

The order of 7 January declared that the theatre had "finally descended into positions alien to Soviet art and had become alien to the Soviet audience". On the one hand, it claimed that "in pursuit of leftist trickery and formalist distortions, even classic works of Russian drama were presented in the theatre in a distorted and artistically deficient form", citing productions of The Government Inspector, Woe from Wit, and The Death of Tarelkin, all of which had been staged many years earlier. On the other hand, it condemned The Suicide by Nikolai Erdman, A Window into the Village, and Commander-2 for presenting "a distorted and slanderous picture of Soviet reality, permeated with ambiguity and even outright anti-Soviet malice". The order further asserted that Soviet plays had virtually disappeared from the theatre's repertoire in recent years, that playwrights had turned away from Meyerhold's theatre, and that its leading actors had left the company. Finally, it alleged that, on the eve of the twentieth anniversary of the October Revolution, the Meyerhold Theatre had "not only failed to prepare a single production, but had made a politically hostile attempt to stage a play by Yevgeny Gabrilovich (One Life), which distorted the well-known literary work How the Steel Was Tempered by Nikolai Ostrovsky in an anti-Soviet manner".

GosTiM gave its final performance on 8 January 1938. It was the 440th performance of The Government Inspector.

== Rehabilitation ==
In December 1961, inspired by the decisions of the 22nd Congress of the Communist Party of the Soviet Union, a group of prominent cultural figures—some formerly associated with GosTiM, such as Igor Ilyinsky, Mikhail Tsaryov, Aleksandr Bezymensky, and Kukryniksy, and others with no direct connection to it, such as Vera Maretskaya, Yuri Zavadsky, Ruben Simonov, Boris Livanov, and Sergey Obraztsov—appealed to Nikita Khrushchev requesting that the 7 January 1938 order be denounced as "false and defamatory from beginning to end". The letter stated, in particular: "The beneficial influence of GosTiM was felt not only in Soviet theatre but also in progressive foreign theatres. In the productions of the finest foreign theatres that toured Moscow in recent years, our youth enthusiastically noted a number of innovative techniques; however, we, members of the older generations, recognized in many of these techniques a creative assimilation of the achievements of Meyerhold's theatre."

Rehabilitation did take place. Already in the first half of the 1960s, the Theatre Encyclopedia stated: "Reducing the theatre's activity solely to its errors and characterizing it as politically hostile to Soviet reality—an assessment used to justify its closure—distorted the objectively historical significance of the theatre's activity."

== Famous theater actors ==
- Igor Ilyinsky (1920-1935)
- Mikhail Zharov (1921-1925)
- Nikolai Ekk (1921-1927)
- Vladimir Lyutse (1921-1923)
- Vasily Zaichikov (1921-1938)
- Maria Babanova (1922-1927)
- Erast Garin (1922-1935)
- Boris Zakhava (1923-1925)
- Ivan Pyryev (1923-1925)
- Nikolay Bogolyubov (1923-1938)
- Nikolay Okhlopkov (1923-1930)
- Zinaida Reich (1923-1938)
- Lev Sverdlin (1923-1938)
- Sergey Martinson (1925-1926, 1929-1933, 1937-1938)
- Valentin Pluchek (1927-1935)
- Daniil Sagal (1928—1938)
- Maksim Shtraukh (1929-1931)
- Alexander Nikitin (actor) (1930-1934)
- Gennadiy Michurin (1931-1937)
- Yury Yuryev (1933-1935)
- Yevgeny Samoylov (1934-1938)
- Mikhail Sadovsky (actor)
- Mikhail Tsaryov (1934-1938)
- Osip Abdulov (1936-1938)
