= Maria Babanova =

Soviet and Russian actress and pedagogue

- Мария Бабанова
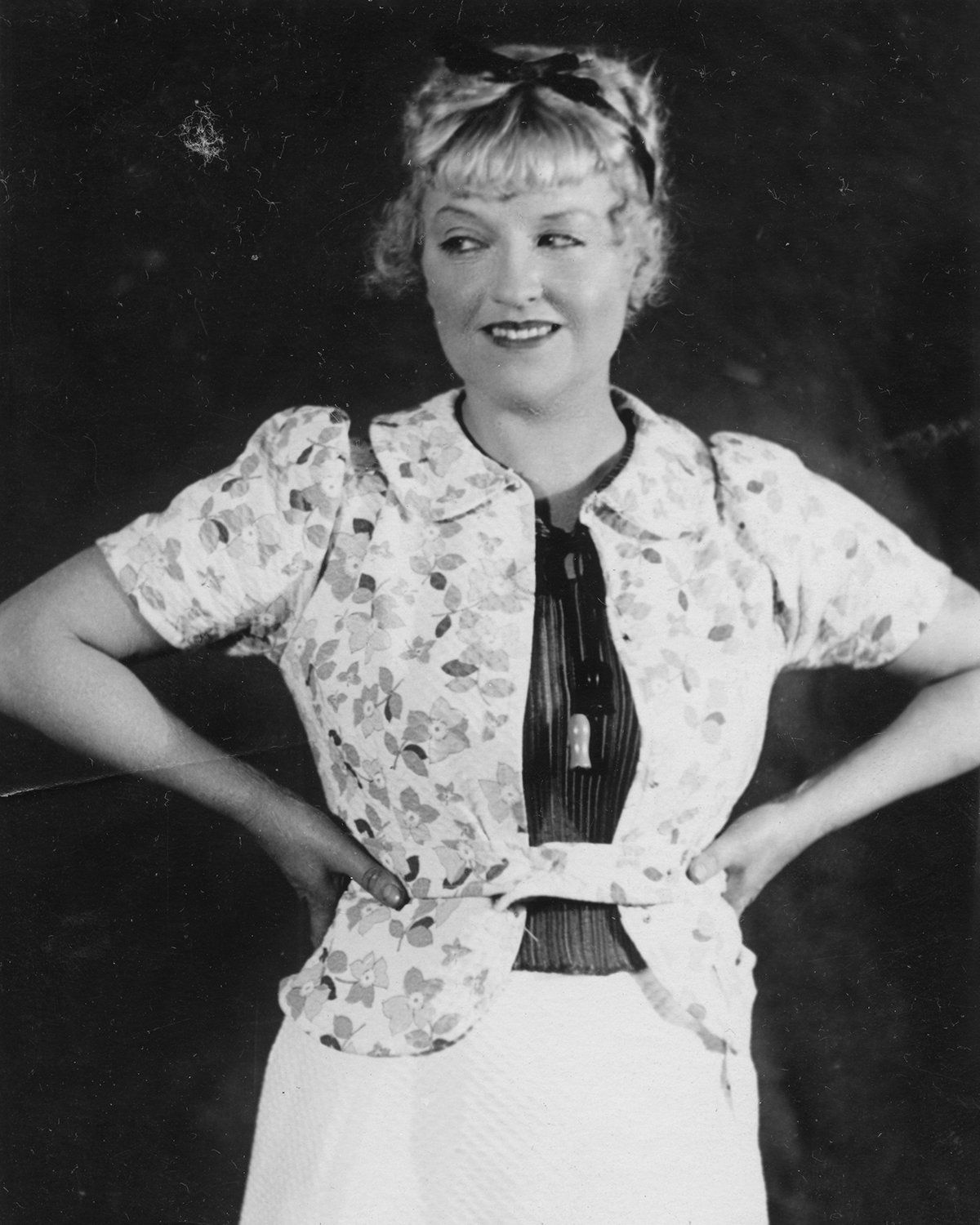
- Born: November 11, 1900; Moscow, Russian Empire
- Died: March 20, 1983 (aged 82); Moscow, Russian SFSR, Soviet Union
- Education: Moscow Art Theater 1979 – 1982; Mayakovsky Theatre 1922 – 1983; Gostim 1920 – 1922
- Occupations: Actress, pedagogue
- Known for: The Snow Queen
- Awards: People's Artist of the USSR, Stanislavsky State Prize of the RSFSR (1972)

Maria Ivanovna Babanova (Note: Russian: Мария Ивановна Бабанова, romanized: Mariya Ivanovna Babanova) (11 November 1900 – 20 March 1983) was a Soviet and Russian actress and pedagogue. She has been described as Vsevolod Meyerhold's greatest actress and was named a People's Artist of the USSR in 1954.

== Life and career ==
Babanova made her debut in Theodore Komisarjevsky's theatre in 1919. A year later, she joined Vsevolod Meyerhold's acting courses. Described as "a small, radiant, energetic actor", Babanova captivated the Moscow public in Meyerhold's production of The Magnanimous Cuckold (1922).

The three leading players, Igor Ilyinsky, Maria Babanova and Vasily Zaichikov were so in harmony they became known collectively as 'Il-Ba-Zai'. Babanova was viewed as the first great actress to emerge after the October Revolution. A typical review of her acting read as follows:

Today no one knows her name but tomorrow she will be hailed as the first of a new galaxy of young actresses. Actresses magically born and reared amidst an arid expanse of wooden constructions, under the piercing gaze of a spotlight on a bare stage - stripped of curtains, wings, of all the mysteries of the old theatre. Actresses who owe that theatre nothing.

Babanova's triumphs allegedly aroused the jealousy of Meyerhold's wife, Zinaida Reich. In 1927, Babanova was forced to leave Meyerhold's troupe, as major female roles went to Reich and she felt underemployed. Babanova excelled at the Mayakovsky Theatre in the roles of children and adolescents. She retired from acting in 1979 and died in 1983, aged 82.

== The Snow Queen ==
The eponymous character from the film of the same name was voiced by her. The animators took a new approach to drawing the Snow Queen. They emphasized the spectral presence of the Snow Queen by using the animation technique known as rotoscoping or "éclair" named after the table manufactured by the company of the same name. Éclair method used a epidiascope that would be fixed on one side of a furniture equipment provided by furniture company Éclair and the screen projector was fixed on the other side. As one of the acclaimed actresses of Soviet Union, Maria Babanova and some of the other cast members were filmed as if the actors are in a live performance with makeup and costume. Then the film footage was transferred to celluloid with some corrections. The role of the Snow Queen would resemble the mannerisms and unique qualities of the actress as the film footage was translated into frame-by-frame drawings. Maria Babanova's voice was fitting for the character.

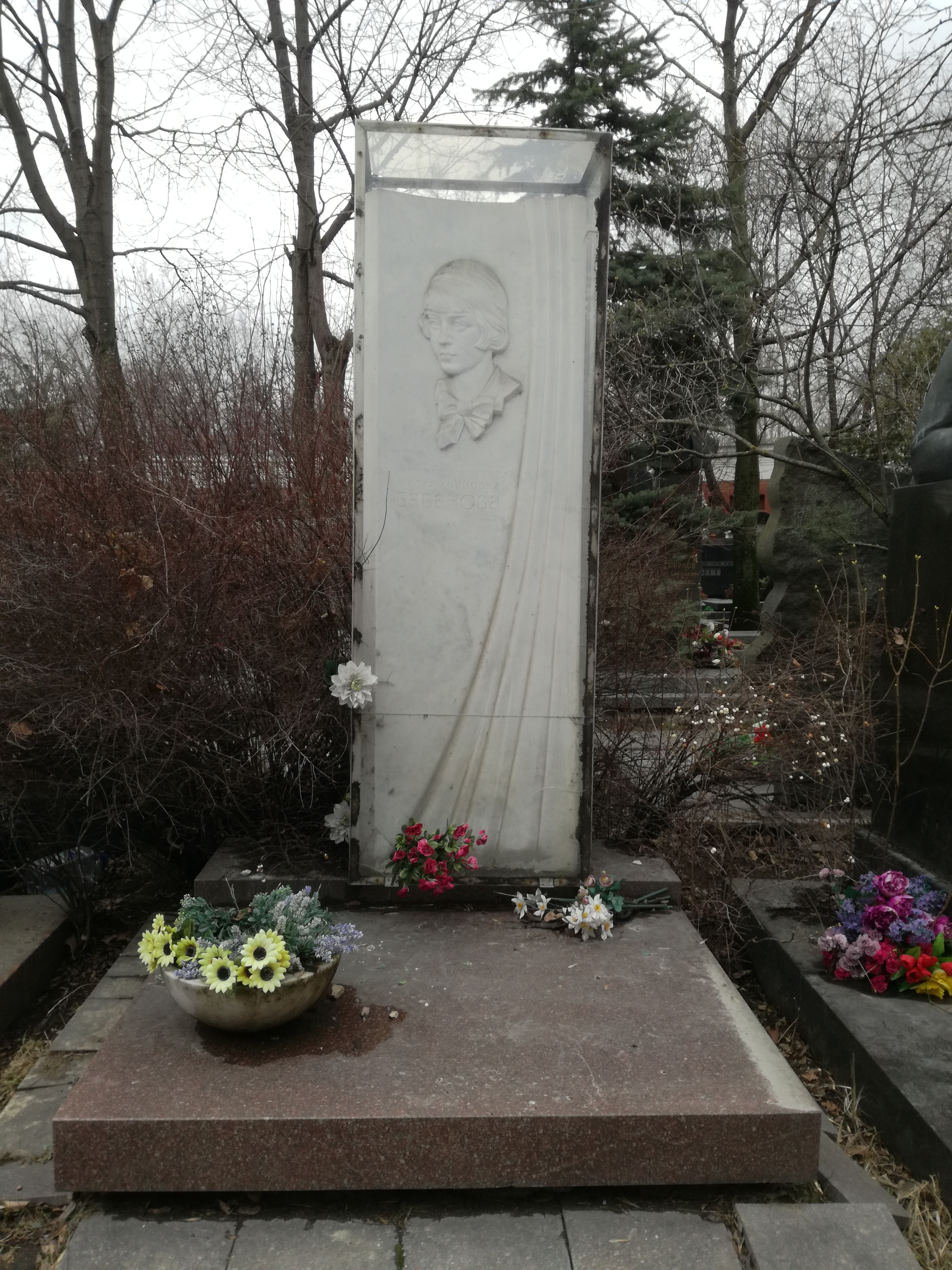
Babanova's grave at the Novodevichy cemetery

== Selected filmography ==
- Alone (1931) as Chairman's wife
- Alisher Navoi (1947) as Gyuli's voice (played by Tamara Nazarova)
- The Tale of the Fisherman and the Fish (1950) as the Golden Fish (voice)
- The Tale of the Dead Princess and the Seven Knights (1951) as Tsarina/Magic Mirror (voice, uncredited)
- The Scarlet Flower (1952) as Lyubava (voice, uncredited)
- In a Faraway Kingdom... (1957) as the Pike (voice)
- The Snow Queen (1957) as The Snow Queen (voice and motion capture)
