= The Bedbug =

1929 play by Vladimir Mayakovsky

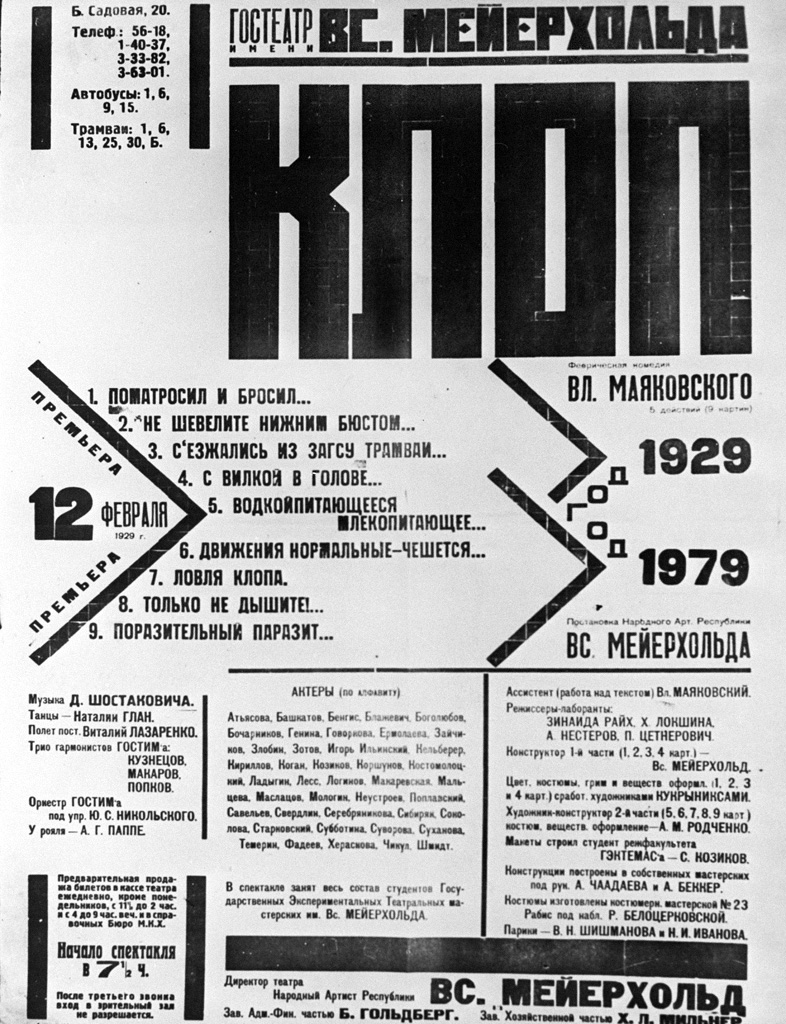
- Premiere poster of The Bedbug, by Kukryniksy and Alexander Rodchenko
- Author: Vladimir Mayakovsky
- Original title: Клоп
- Language: Russian
- Genre: Play, Satire
- Publication date: 1929
- Publication place: Russia
- Media type: Print (hardback & paperback)
- Preceded by: Mystery-Bouffe (1918)
- Followed by: The Bathhouse (1930)

The Bedbug (Russian: Клоп, romanized: Klop) is a play by Vladimir Mayakovsky written in 1928–1929 and published originally by Molodaya Gvardiya magazine (Nos. 3 and 4, 1929), then as a book, by Gosizdat, in 1929. "The faerie comedy in nine pictures", lampooning the type of philistine that emerged with the New Economic Policy in the Soviet Union, was premiered in February 1929 at the Meyerhold Theatre, with designs by Alexander Rodchenko. Received warmly by audiences, it caused controversy and received harsh treatment in the Soviet press. Unlike its follow-up, The Bathhouse (denounced as ideologically deficient), The Bedbug was criticised mostly for its alleged "aesthetic faults".

The play deals with the themes of suspended animation and being a proverbial fish out of water. In 1929, a young man is frozen in suspended animation during his wedding day. He is revived in the supposedly utopian world of 1979, where drunkenness, smoking, and swearing are long gone. Seen as a relic of the past, he ends up as a human exhibit at the local zoo.

== Plot ==
The action of the play begins in 1929 in the U.S.S.R. Ivan Prisypkin is a young man in the age of NEP. On the day of his wedding to Elzevira Davidovna Renaissance, Prisypkin is frozen in a basement. In 1979 (fifty years later), he is revived in a world that looks very different. Around him is an ideal communist world, almost a utopia. There is no more poverty and destitution, illness and natural disasters have been defeated, and people have forgotten about drunkenness, smoking, and swearing. Prisypkin does not belong in this future. He becomes an exhibit at the zoo and serves as an example of the vices of a past age to the citizens of the future. The title of the play comes from a bed bug which was frozen at the same time as Prisypkin and becomes his companion.

== Characters ==
- Ivan Prisypkin (Pierre Skripkin) - former worker, former party member, fiancé of Elzevira
- Zoya Beryozkina - worker
- Oleg Bard - landlord
- Elzevira Davidovna Renaissance - Prisypkin's fiancée, manicurist, cashier at hair salon
- Rosalie Pavlovna Renaissance - mother of Elzevira
- David Osipovich Renaissance - father of Elzevira
- Usher at wedding
- Professor
- Director of the Zoo
- Chairman of the City Council
- Fire Warden
- Orator
- Workers, Reporters, Crowd, Hunters, Students, Attendants, Firemen

== Production ==
Vsevolod Meyerhold directed the production of The Bedbug at the Meyerhold Theatre, which was preceded by a reading by Mayakovsky. Incidental music was composed by Dmitri Shostakovich, who later published a suite of extracts as Op. 19a. At a reading of the play before the theatre management it was recognized as "a significant phenomenon of Soviet drama," called "the Soviet Government Inspector", and it was suggested to include it in the repertoire. The play had been performed publicly for three years.

In 1975, a film Mayakovsky Laughs was shot in the Soviet Union, based on the play and Mayakovsky's previously unused screenplay "Forget about the Fireplace" (Russian: «Позабудь про камин»), a similar anti-philistine satire. (Note: Mayakovsky explained that he selected the title "Forget about the Fireplace" because he saw the film Forget about the Fireplace, Its Fire is Gone (the title resembles an opening line of a Russian romance.))
