= The Bathhouse =

1930 Russian-language satirical play by Vladimir Mayakovsky

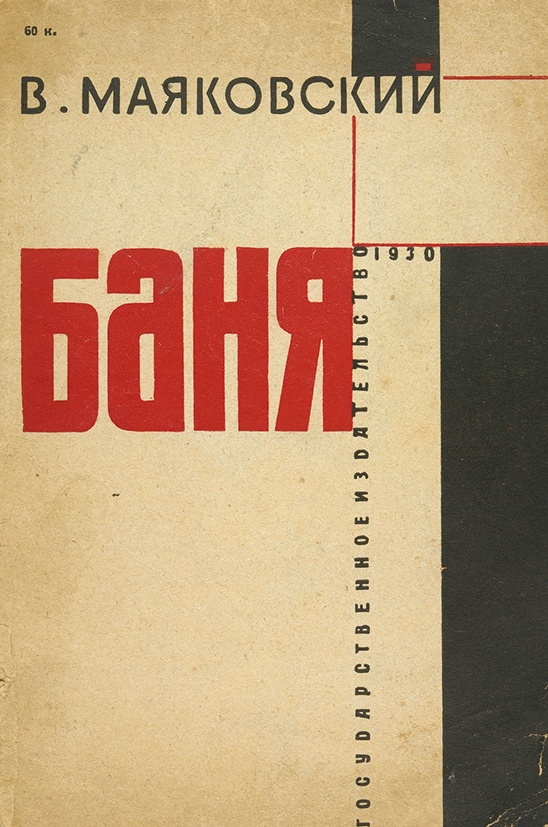
- Author: Vladimir Mayakovsky
- Original title: Баня
- Language: Russian
- Genre: Play
- Publisher: Gosizdat
- Publication date: 1930
- Publication place: USSR
- Media type: Print (hardback & paperback)
- Preceded by: The Bedbug (1929)

The Bathhouse (Баня, Banya) is a play by Vladimir Mayakovsky written in 1929, for the Meyerhold Theatre. It was published for the first time in the November, No.11 issue of Oktyabr magazine and released as a book by Gosizdat in 1930. The play premiered at the People's House's Drama Theatre, in Leningrad on January 30, 1930. The "6-act drama with the circus and the fireworks" (according to the subtitle), satirizing bureaucratic stupidity and opportunism under Joseph Stalin, evoked strong criticism in the Soviet press, particularly from the Russian Association of Proletarian Writers.

The play is initially set in the year 1930. An inventor has a functioning time machine, but he is tormented by his era's Soviet bureaucracy. A female time traveler from 2030 invites an expedition to visit her own era, but the bureaucrats are thrown off the Machine.

== Synopsis ==
In 1930 the inventor Chudakov creates the Time machine, but experiences great difficulties, having to face the Soviet bureaucracy, mainly in the face of Pobedonosikov, an archetype bureaucrat. The Phosphorescent Woman arrives from 2030 (sent by the Institute of Studying of the History of Communism) and invites to her time and space every single person who has got at least some virtue. As the expedition starts into the Communist future, Pobedonosikov and other 'baddies' get thrown off the Machine, ejected by the Time itself.

== Background ==
Mayakovsky started working upon The Bathhouse right after his return to Moscow from France on 2 May 1929. As well as its predecessor, The Bedbug, this one in retrospect is seen as a logical continuation of Mayakovsky’s late 1920s satirical cycle; several of its themes and sub-plots have been taken from the shorter poems of 1926-1929. "[The play's] political agenda is fighting the narrow-mindedness, opportunism, bureaucratism, and paving the way for heroism, the tempo increase, for the Socialist perspectives," the author told Literaturnaya Gazeta in a 1929 interview.

== History ==
The Bathhouse's rough version was finished in September 1929, but Mayakovsky continued to make changes to the text while performing the play at public recitals. On 22 September he read the play at home to a circle of friends, the next day at the meeting of the Meyerhold Theatre's Arts and politics council.

Speaking at the discussion which followed, Vsevolod Meyerhold extolled The Bathhouse, rating it as high as the best work of Moliere, Pushkin and Gogol. "[This play] is the greatest phenomenon in the history of the Russian theatre, but we have to applaud Mayakovsky the poet, who's given us the pieces of prose, written as masterfully as the poetry... Without any doubt, Mayakovsky starts [with it] the whole new epoch." The Council's resolution unanimously recommended the play to be produced at the theatre. According to the contract, signed on 5 October, Mayakovsky’s function at the theatre was to be the director's assistant. Judging by the drawings the author made of Pobedonosikov and Optimistenko characters, he also planned to work as a designer.

More public recitals followed: on 27 September (at home in Moscow), 12 October (the State Academic Chapel hall, Leningrad), 13 October (Moskovsky-Narvsky House of Arts, Leningrad), 20 October (Press House, Leningrad), 25 October (Polytechnic Museum), 27 October (the Press House, Moscow). Mayakovsky performed for the workers’ audiences in factories, including Moscow's 1st Exemplary Typography (30 October), Krasny Luch (9 November), Proletary (4 December) and Icarus (28 December). Speaking to the audience of the Moscow 1st Typography on 30 October, Mayakovsky commented upon the question of whether the play has been now fully complete: "I never regard any of my work as complete and final 'monument to myself', as it were. I firmly believe in the creative forces of the working class, I come to [the workers' audience] get some help regularly... I receive criticism of different sort, and try to find use for all of these critical remarks."

On 20 December Mayakovsky read The Bathhouse at the Narkompros' repertoire committee and took part in the discussion that followed. Serious problems with censorship arose, though, and the play was approved for production only on 9 February 1930, on condition that some of the episodes would be "softened".

All the while Mayakovsky, deeply involved in the rehearsals at the Meyerhold Theatre, was changing the text of the play continuously. Not all these changes have made their way into the printed edition of the play; the manuscript of this extended stage version of the text has been lost.

=== Productions ===
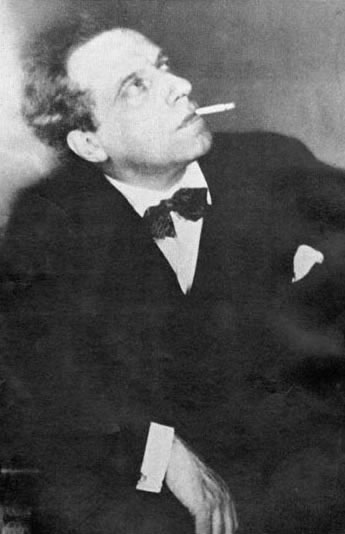
Director Vsevolod Meyerhold rated the play exceptionally high. In March 1930 he tried to defend Mayakovsky, whom Pravda accused of supporting the "leftist slant".

The play premiered on 30 January 1930 at the People's House's Drama theatre in Leningrad, directed by Meyerhold's student Vladimir Lyutze, with Boris Babochkin in the leading role. Among those present was Mikhail Zoshchenko, who in 1933 remembered: "The play was received with deadly coldness. Not a burst of laughter, not a single clap in the course of the first two acts. Never in my life have I witnessed a flop so heavy."

The Bathhouse premiered at the Meyerhold Theatre on 16 March 1930, with Maxim Shtraukh as Pobedonosikov and Zinaida Reich as the Phosphorescent Woman. The musical score for the show was written by Vissarion Shebalin. One of the junior cast members (playing reporter Momentalshchikov) was Valentin Pluchek who in 1953 produced The Bathhouse at the Moscow Satire Theatre. Again, the audience remained largely unmoved. Actor Igor Ilyinsky remembered in 1958: "I saw Vladimir Vladimirovich at the Meyerhold Theatre premier... After the performance which was received not particularly well by the public, Mayakovsky, who felt [his failure] acutely, stood in the lobby all by himself, looking each and every person who was leaving the theatre straight into the eye."

On 17 March The Bathhouse was shown at the Leningrad's Tovstonogov Bolshoi Drama Theater, directed by Pavel Weisbrem, with Sergey Balashov as Pobedonosikov. All three productions evoked stormy criticism in the Soviet press (a lone exception being the 8 April 1930 Pravda article by V.Popov-Dubovskoy). Such hostile reaction dealt a heavy blow to the author and apparently contributed to his submerging into deep depression.

The Bathhouse was performed – by the Meyerhold Theatre during its tour in Povolzhye (1930), and the Tovstonogov Theatre in Belorussia and Ukraine (1930), but by 1931 the play has been dropped from both theatres repertoire, as, after its author's suicide the four-year 'silent obstruction' campaign got started in the Soviet press, which Lilya Brik put a dramatic end to in 1935 with her daring personal letter to Stalin.

On 19 July 1951, on the day of Mayakovsky's 58th birthday, the Ruben Simonov-produced version of the play (featuring Igor Ilyinsky as Pobedonosikov) was broadcast on the Soviet Radio. Its massive success had a snowball effect, several major productions followed in 1952-1953 which marked the "second birth" of The Bathhouse in the Soviet theatre.

In 1962 a feature-length animated film The Bathhouse based on the play was released by Soyuzmultfilm studio.

== Characters ==
- Pobedonosikov, the chief of the Directing the Coordination process department.
- Polya, his wife
- Pont Kitch, the foreigner (↓)
- Optimistenko, Pobedonosikov's secretary
- Isak Belvedonsky, portraitist, naturalist, batalist
- Momentalshchikov, reporter
- Nochkin, embezzler
- Chudakov, inventor
- Velosipedkin, light cavalry man
- Madame Mezalyansova, interpreter
- Foskin, Dvoikin and Troikin, workers
- Ivan Ivanovich, minor official
- The Phosphorescent Woman
- The chairman of the House Committee

(↑) Pont Kitch's speeches look like indecipherable nonsense, but they are an elaborate linguistic experiment in which the English phrases are compiled with the phonetically similar Russian words. The translator Rita Rait who helped Mayakovsky, remembered in her memoirs: "Mayakovsky said: 'We have to come up simultaneously with an English word and the Russian one, constructed on the base of it. For example, 'is very well' in Russian would be 'i zver revel' ('and a beast was roaring') [...] Thus from 'do you want' emerged 'dui Ivan' ('blow, Ivan'), 'plenty' turned into 'plyunte' ('spit'), 'just mean' - into 'jasmine', 'I understand' - into 'Indostan' ('Hindustan'), 'I say if' - into 'Aseyev' (the surname). Some words were used in their Russian transcriptions: 'sleep' - 's lip' ('from linden-trees'), 'to go' - 'tugo' ('tight'), 'swell' - 'svel' ('brought together')..."

== Critical reception ==
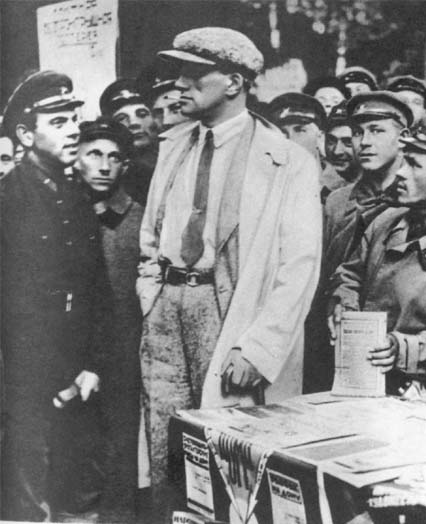
Mayakovsky was much more popular with workers and soldiers than with the colleagues in RAPP, who led the 1930 anti-Bathhouse campaign.

All three premiere performances of The Bathhouse in Leningrad and Moscow evoked stormy criticism in the Soviet press. According to Krasnaya Gazeta, the issue of bureaucratism in it was "handled... superficially and one-sidedly," the play's fantasies being "abstract and bloodless." "The audiences remained emotionally cold and were indifferently trying to follow the plot which in itself occasionally is muddled," wrote a reviewer. In his bid to expose this vice, Mayakovsky "failed to provide the class analysis of the bureaucratism… The People House's Drama Theatre's production by V. Lyutse proved to be uninventive and only aggravated the author's fallacies," Leningradskaya Pravda (2 February) argued.

"Boredom rules in the People's House at the performance of The Bathhouse by Mayakovsky. You just sit there and wait until all this ends. The audience is cold as ice... The play's main issue, bureaucratism, is approached in a primitive way, and no flight of fantasy can save this politically vapid thing... The production (director Lyutse) has failed to improve the play, engaged in experimenting with form for the form's sake, without much thought for content," wrote Smena on 5 February.

On 9 March, a week before the Moscow premiere, Pravda published Vladimir Yermilov's article "On the Petty Bourgeois Leftism in our Fiction" where, on the strength of just one published fragment he accused the author of supporting "the Leftish slant". Meyerhold in the 13 March issue of Vechernyaya Moskva defended Mayakovsky and his play. On 17 March Yermilov in an article called "Three Mistakes of Comrade Meyerhold" reinstated his position. Mayakovsky responded by coming up with a slogan hung in the theatre's hall during the performance, which read: "You won't steam off the bureaucrats' hordes at once / There won't be bathhouses, or soap enough / Besides, bureaucrats are being supported / by critics like Yermilov". The RAPP leadership demanded that the slogan should be removed, and it was. Yermilov was mentioned in Mayakovsky's suicidal note as the one he would have liked to "see through this raw with."

The 16 March performance at the Meyerhold Theatre was followed by the second wave of criticism in the Soviet press. On 21 March Rabochaya Gazeta wrote:

It is impossible to believe in Mayakovsky's dream because he himself does not believe in it himself. All these "time machines" and "phosphorescent women" are nothing but a noisy twaddle. And his scornful attitude towards our reality in which he sees nobody but the ignorant chatterboxes, narcissistic bureaucrats and the 'passers-by', is quite telling... His workers are lifeless stooges speaking the heavy, tricky language of Mayakovsky himself. All in all, a wearisome, confused performance which could be interesting just for a small group of literary gourmets. Workers won't take such 'bath' eagerly.

"Mayakovsky portrays monstrous bureaucrats without pointing to the ways of dealing with them," Komsomolskaya Pravda complained on 22 March 1930, concluding: "In all honesty, the play turned out bad, Meyerhold had no business staging it." Nasha Gazeta found the author's exposure of bureaucratism not 'serious' enough. "Newspapers are full of examples of bureaucratic monstrosities, and what Mayakovsky does is with a serious face... reports about the cases of petty bureaucracy... The play is not serious enough for the times we live in," read the 28 March 1930 review.

Elsewhere, The Bathhouse was described as "a mix of hoary anecdotes... cheap puns, rough prose, high-school utopias and popular science" (Rabochy I Teatr, 5 February), "superficial", and failing to "put its subject matter into the context of class struggle" (Rabochy i Iskusstvo, 20 March), "dated agitka" (Rabochy i Teatr, 1 April), "overblown, obscure and fragmentary" (Krasnaya Gazeta, 19, 26 March).

On 10 April Mayakovsky attended the performance of The Bathhouse at the Meyerhold Theatre. Critic Alexander Fevralsky remembered: "He stood looking morbid and smoked, leaning against the doorpost. To cheer him up, I started speaking about the Popov-Dubovskoy's article in Pravda, which, written by the culture department's chief reflected the position of the newspaper thus probably putting an end to this anti-Bathhouse campaign. "It doesn't matter anymore, this is too late," he retorted. Four days later Mayakovsky committed suicide.
