= Mayakovsky Theatre =

Russian theater

Mayakovsky Theater
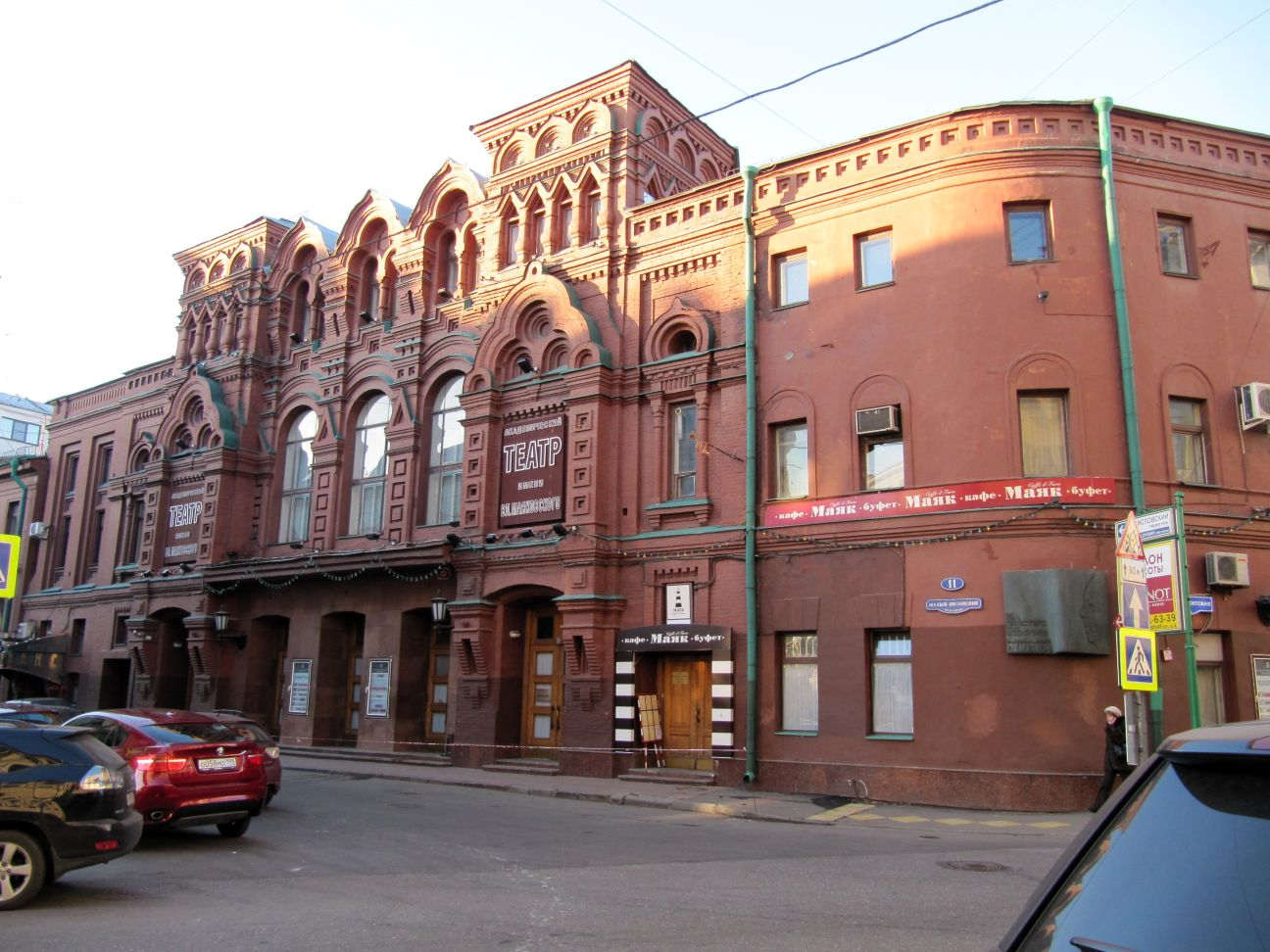
- Interactive map of Mayakovsky Theater
- Address: Bolshaya Nikitskaya, 19/13; Moscow; Russian Federation

Construction
- Opened: 1920
- Years active: 1920-present
- Architect: Konstantin Tersky (1886)

Website
- https://www.mayakovsky.ru/

Mayakovsky Theater (Russian: Театр Маяковского; Московский академический театр имени Вл. Маяковского) is a theater in Moscow, Russia, founded in 1920, first as Terevsat (Theater of Revolutionary Satire, 1920-1922), then Revolution Theater (1922-1943) and Drama Theater (1944-1953). In 1954 it was renamed after Vladimir Mayakovsky.

== History ==
The theatre At Nikitsky (that's how it was known for a while) was built in 1886 by Konstantin Tersky specifically as a venue for famous foreign artists visiting Moscow. Among those who performed there in the late 19th century were Sarah Bernhardt, Eleonora Duse, Ernst von Possart, Jean Mounet-Sully, Coquelin Sr. and Coquelin Jr. At the turn of the 20th century the theater was known as Internationale.

Since 1920 the newly founded Theater of Revolutionary Satire (Теревсат) was based in the building. In 1922 it was reorganized and renamed into Revolution Theater (Театр революции) with Vsevolod Meyerhold at the helm.

In 1931-1942 Alexei Popov (1892-1961) was the Revolution Theater director; among the better known productions of this period were "Poem of an Axe", "My Friend", "Romeo and Juliet", "Death of a Squadron".

His successor Nikolay Okhlopkov (1943-1967) left a lasting imprint on the theatre's style of performance. His major productions included "The Young Guard", "Mother", "Zykovs", "The Storm", "Hamlet, "The Bug", "Aristocrats", and "The Irkutsk Story". During Okhlopkov's tenure the name was changed twice: first into Drama Theater (1944), then into Mayakovsky Theater (1954).

In 1968 Andrey Goncharov became the director, his rule lasting for more than thirty years, up until his death in 2001. This period's highlights were "Talents And Admirers", "Vanyushin’s Children", "The Defeat", "The Bankrupt", "A Streetcar Named Desire", "A Man from Lamanchi", "Talks With Socrates", "Seagull", "Lady Macbeth of Mtsensk", "The Life of Klim Samgin", "Fruits of Enlightenment".

In 2002 the theatre's director became Sergei Artsibashev (who for ten years has led the Pokrovka Theatre). His first two productions, Gogol’s "Marriage" and "Karamazovs" after Fyodor Dostoyevsky (in V.Malyuagin’s version) proved to be a triumph. In the 2005 premier of "Dead Souls" (representing for the first times both parts of Gogol's classic) Artsybashev played Chichikov.

== Troupe ==
=== Best known actors of the past ===
- Maria Babanova (1900-1983)
- Zinaida Reich (1894-1939)
- Mark Bernes (1911-1969)
- Zoya Fyodorova (1907-1981)
- Sergey Martinson (1899-1984)
- Faina Ranevskaya (1896-1984)
- Rostislav Plyatt (1908-1989)
- Nikolay Okhlopkov (1900-1967)
- Vladimir Belokurov (1904-1973)
- Yevgeny Samoylov (1912-2006)
- Vladimir Samoilov (1924-1999)
- Alexander Demyanenko (1937-1999)
- Andrei Boltnev (1946-1995)
- Natalya Gundareva (1948-2005)
- Alexander Lazarev (1938-2011)
- Anatoli Romashin (1931-2000)
- Pavel Morozenko (1939-1991)
- Nina Ter-Osipyan (1925-2002)
- Aleksandr Fatyushin (1951-2003)

=== Present ===
==== People's Artists of Russia ====
- Yevgenya Simonova
- Svetlana Nemolyayeva
- Igor Kashintsev
- Igor Kostolevsky

==== Meritorious Artists of Russia ====
- Galina Belyayeva
