= Tatyana Yesenina =

Soviet writer

Tatyana Sergeevna Yesenina (Russian: Татьяна Сергеевна Есенина; 29 May 1918 – 6 May 1992) was a Soviet writer, the daughter of Sergei Yesenin and his second wife Zinaida Raikh.

Tatyana was raised in Moscow. She was exiled to Tashkent in 1941, after the murder of her mother by the NKVD. In Tashkent, Tatyana worked as a journalist, producing many articles and sketches. She published a memoir of her father, The House on the Nikolsky Boulevard. Tatyana's novel Zhenya, the Wonder of the Twentieth Century was the only work of fiction she published in her lifetime, though she left other works in manuscript at her death.

== English translations ==
- Male Bonding Sessions, (extract from Zhenya, the Wonder of the Twentieth Century), from Anthology of Russian Women's Writing, 1777-1992, Oxford University Press, 1994. ISBN 0-19-871505-6
