= Mystery-Bouffe =

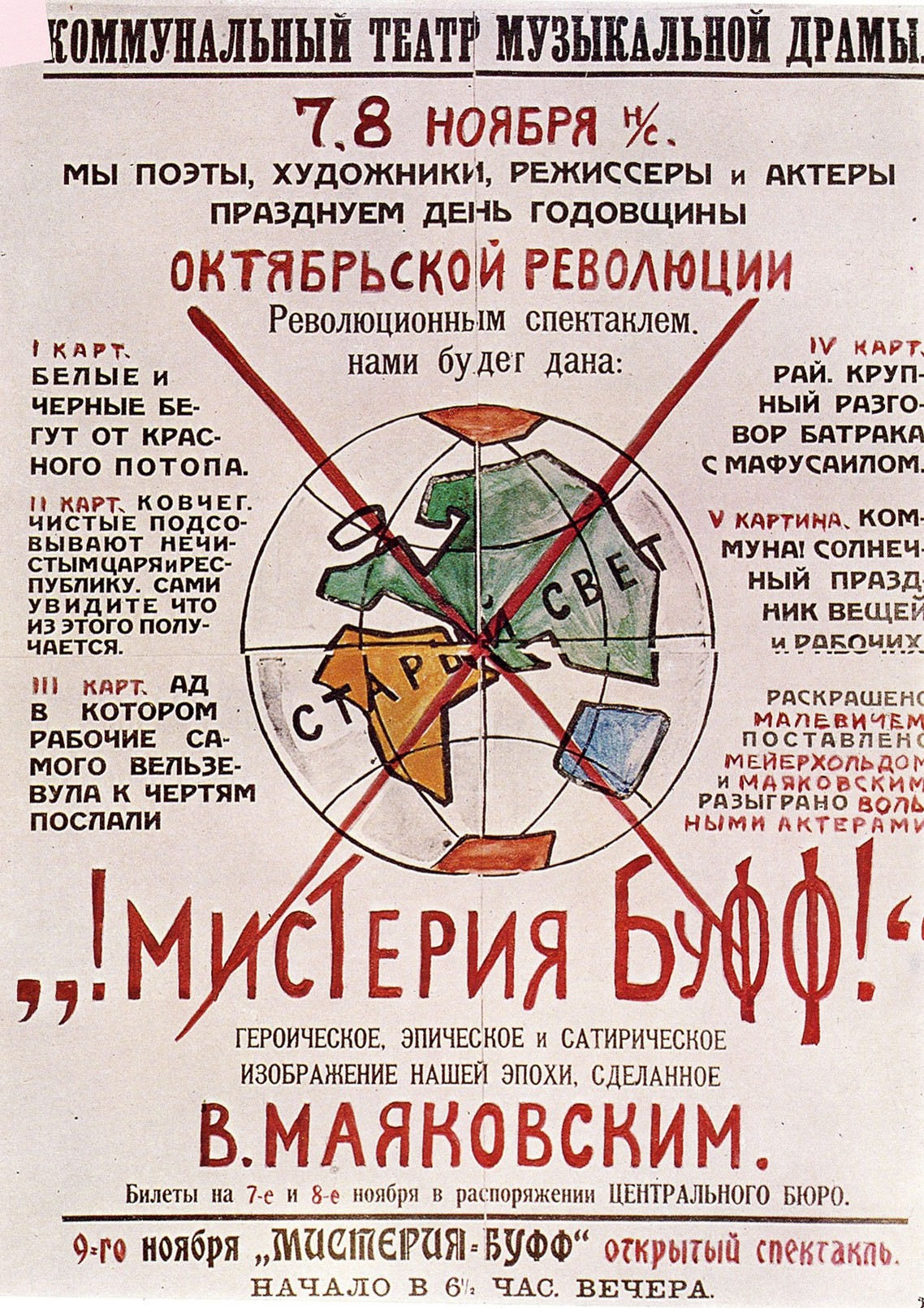
- Written by: Vladimir Mayakovsky
- Characters: The Clean; The Unclean; A Compromiser; An Intellectual; The Lady with the Hatboxes; Devils; Saints; Jehovah; Actors of the Promised Land; The Man of the Future
- Original language: Russian
- Setting: The Entire Universe; The Ark; Hell; Paradise; Land of Chaos; The Promised Land

Premiere
- Date premiered: November 18, 1918
- Place premiered: Theatre of Musical Drama; Petrograd, Russia

Mystery-Bouffe (Russian: Мистерия-Буфф; Misteriya-Buff) is a socialist dramatic play written by Vladimir Mayakovsky in 1918/1921. Mayakovsky stated in a preface to the 1921 edition that "in the future, all persons performing, presenting, reading or publishing Mystery-Bouffe should change the content, making it contemporary, immediate, up-to-the-minute."

== Plot ==
Mayakovsky defined the theatre as "an arena reflecting life". The play's production laid the foundations of agitational theatre; it was the first experience of political satire in the Soviet theatre. It combined revolutionary pathos, the vocabulary of a mass rally, and the organic nature of a street show with its farcical nature and major key. The play coexists with topical facts of the political moment and poetic and philosophical digressions. The main theme is the unshakable faith in the victory of the people.

== First version ==
The play was written for the anniversary of the 1917 revolution, and was accepted by the Central Bureau to be part of the festivities. The title is likely a reference to the opera buffa/opéra bouffe, comic opera genres popular at the time. This original version was directed and produced by Vsevolod Meyerhold, and the art was done by Kazimir Malevich. The premiere was in the Theatre of Musical Drama on November 7, 1918.

Mayakovsky himself played the role of the "simple man", as well as some bit roles including Methuselah and one of the demons. This version of the play lasted three seasons.

== Second version ==
After two years, Mayakovsky reworked the text of his play. This second version premiered in the First Theatre of the RSFSR on May 1, 1921. A printed edition of the second version was released in June of that year. This version of the play lasted about 100 shows.

== Later versions ==
Mystery-Bouffe
- Written by: Vladimir Mayakovsky (Play); Robert Vikkers (Script)
- Music by: G. Firtich
- Production company: Kievnauchfilm studio
- Release date: 1969
- Running time: 60 minutes
- Country: Ukrainian SSR

A 60-minute animated film adaptation of the play was made in 1969, directed by David Cherkasskiy. It was the first animated feature to be made in Ukraine. The Soviet government banned screenings outside of the Ukrainian SSR. In 2015, the director of the film uploaded it to Youtube.

In 2007, after several decades of the play not being seen anywhere, the Moscow A.R.T.O. theatre put on an updated version of the play which was dubbed "Mystery-Bouffe. The Clean Variant", based on the texts of the first and second versions. It premiered in France on May 1, 2007.

== Characters ==
1. Seven Pairs of the Clean:

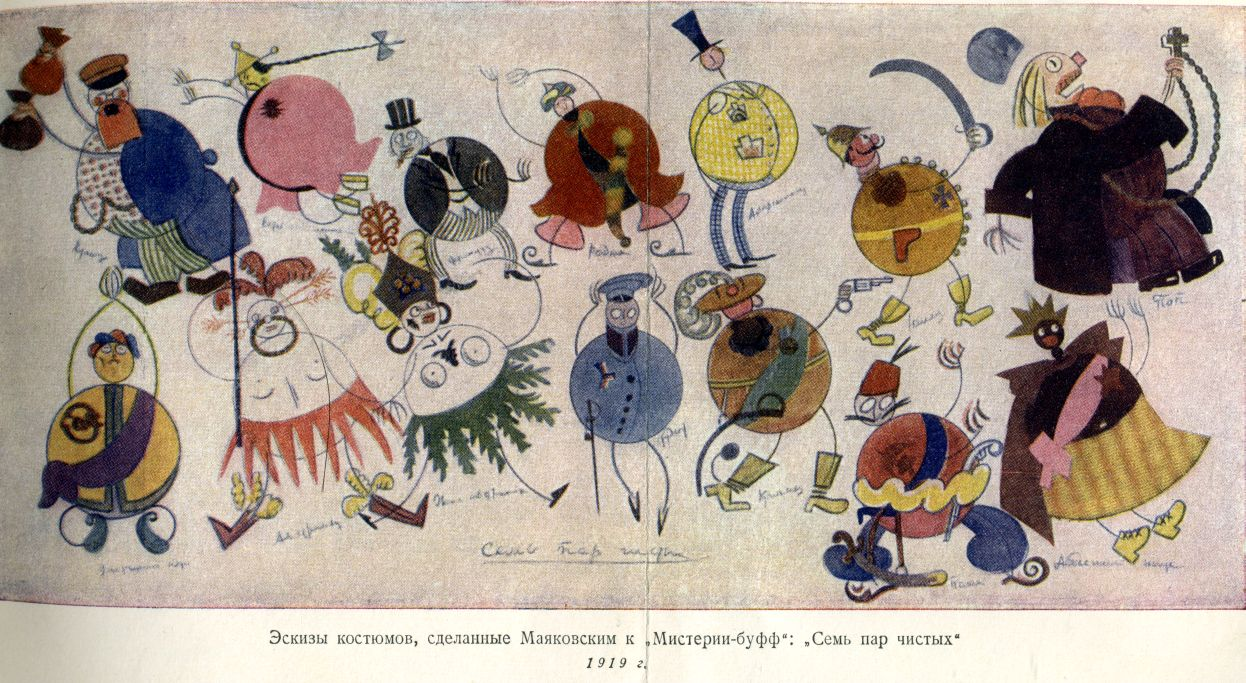
V.V.Mayakovsky. Costume art for the roles of the Seven Pairs of the Clean

1. 1) The Negus of Abyssinia
  2) An Indian Raja
  3) A Turkish Pasha
  4) A Russian Merchant (Speculator)
  5) A Chinese
  6) A Well-fed Persian
  7) Clemenceau
  8) A German
  9) A Russian Priest
  10) An Australian
  11) His Wife
  12) Lloyd George
  13) An American
  14) A Diplomat

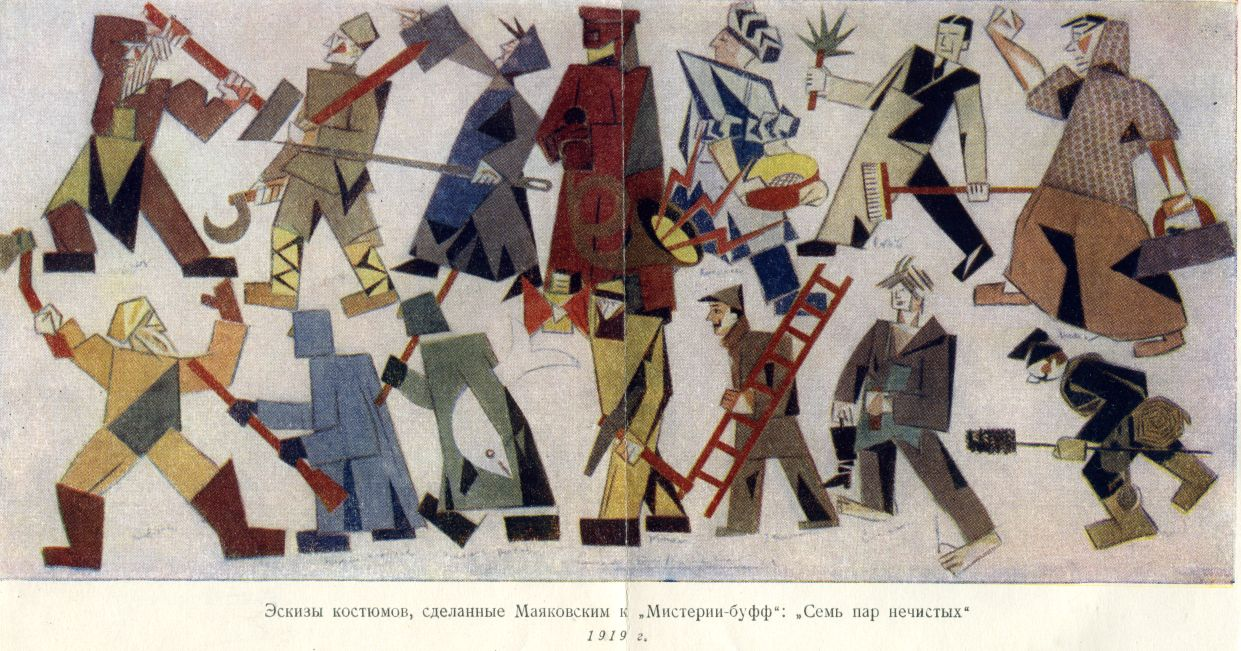
V.V.Mayakovsky. Costume art for the roles of the Seven Pairs of the Unclean

1. Seven Pairs of the Unclean:
  1) A Soldier of the Red Army
  2) A Lamplighter
  3) A Truckdriver
  4) A Miner
  5) A Carpenter
  6) A Farmhand
  7) A Servant (Female)
  8) A Blacksmith
  9) A Baker
  10) A Laundress
  11) A Seamstress
  12) A Locomotive Engineer
  13) An Eskimo Fisherman
  14) An Eskimo Hunter
2. A Compromiser
3. An Intellectual
4. The Lady with the Hatboxes
5. Devils:
  1) Beelzebub
  2) Master-of-ceremonies Devil
  3) First Messenger
  4) Second Messenger
  5) Guard
  6) 20 of the Clean with Horns and Tails
6. Saints:
  1) Methuselah
  2) Jean-Jacques Rousseau
  3) Leo Tolstoy
  4) Gabriel
  5) First Angel
  6) Second Angel
  7) Angels.
7. Jehovah
8. Actors of the Promised Land:
  1) A Hammer
  2) A Sickle
  3) Machines
  4) Trains
  5) Automobiles
  6) A Carpenter's Plane
  7) Tongs
  8) A Needle
  9) A Saw
  10) Bread
  11) Salt
  12) Sugar
  13) Fabrics
  14) A Boot
  15) A Board and Lever
9. The Man of the Future

== Settings ==
- Act 1 — The entire universe.
- Act 2 — The Ark.
- Act 3 — Hell.
- Act 4 — Paradise.
- Act 5 — Lord of chaos.
- Act 6 — The promised land.

== See also ==
- Mistero Buffo by Dario Fo
- Vsevolod Meyerhold State Theatre
