= Le Cocu magnifique =

Le Cocu magnifique is a Belgian play by Fernand Crommelynck. It was first published in 1921.

In 1921, the famous Russian director Vsevolod Meyerhold, moving toward Constructivism, founded his own school, called GVYRM, where his students were trained in the art of biomechanics, an extreme exaltation of the body's plastic and acrobatic potential, the result of Meyerhold's studies of the techniques of oriental theater and the Commedia dell'Arte.

In 1922, he staged Crommelynck's biomechanical show Le Cocu magnifique, building an enormous scaffolding of ladders and slopes on the stage from which the actors, wearing overalls, performed a symphonic sequence of exercises and acrobatics immersed in a scene of typical constructivist nudity.photo le cocu magnifique on stange

The play was performed in the Netherlands on November 15, 1956 by the Utrecht Student Theatre Association (Utrechtse Studenten Toneel Vereniging). The translation was by Krijn Prince, and the play was directed by professional director Jack Dixon.

== Plot ==
Bruno, the village scribe, is married to a beautiful and devoted young woman named Stella. He makes a good living composing love letters for the uneducated villagers, many of which are addressed to his wife. Bruno's eloquence can lift him off into rhapsodies of brilliant exaggeration. As a character verging on the manic, his paranoia is easily excited. He convinces himself that his fear of being cuckolded can be appeased only by the certainty of knowing he is a cuckold. Therefore, he offers his wife first to his best friend and then, when that fails to appease him, to all the young men of the village. This demented decision disrupts village life: the town turns violently against him, and the women of the village threaten Stella with torture, degradation and expulsion.

== Constructivist design ==
Vsevolod Meyerhold's production (1922), with set and props based on the designs of Lyubov Popova, broke away from the “conventional framing of the acting area” by eliminating the wings and proscenium arch from the scenery. He believed that the scenery should just represent the setting in its most basic form rather than “illusionistic settings”. Due to the nature of theatre, Theatrical Constructivism is somewhat of an oxymoron. Its use in theatrical productions is not strictly utilitarian like many constructivists desired. Theatre requires a certain amount of subjectivity and use of imagination on the audience's end. Meyerhold's production, despite being vastly different from what people were accustomed to, was received very well. The set for The Magnanimous Cuckold consisted of framework, rotating wheels in the background to signify machinery, and a windmill to indicate the play's location. The intention of the simplified scenery was to “organize a scenic space in the way most convenient for the actors”.

In addition to facilitating the actors, the scenery was also designed with the expectation that it could be presented outside as well, due to the closing of Meyerhold's theater. This resulted in the set being easily deconstructed and reconstructed, a strong indication of constructivist influence on the production.

Another indication of this influence comes from a large, black, rotating disc in the background. On this disc the letters 'CR-ML-NCK' were painted in white, which made it far more visible when the disc rotated (along with the two wheels) which coincided with the changing passions of the characters. There was not a subjective meaning to the letters on the disc; they referenced the writer (Crommelynck), and made the rotation of the disc more obvious than a purely black disc would be.

The simplified scenery in constructivist theatre was simply meant to inform the idea of the play, not to take on a more important or formal position.

The Magnanimous Cuckold stage by Meyerhold "unveiled a new Constructivist and biomechanical theatre, entirely based on movement and a mastery of the stage space and time".

== Film adaptation ==
The Magnificent Cuckold or Il magnifico cornuto is a 1965 Italian film directed by Antonio Pietrangeli and adapted from the original play.

== Opera adaptation ==
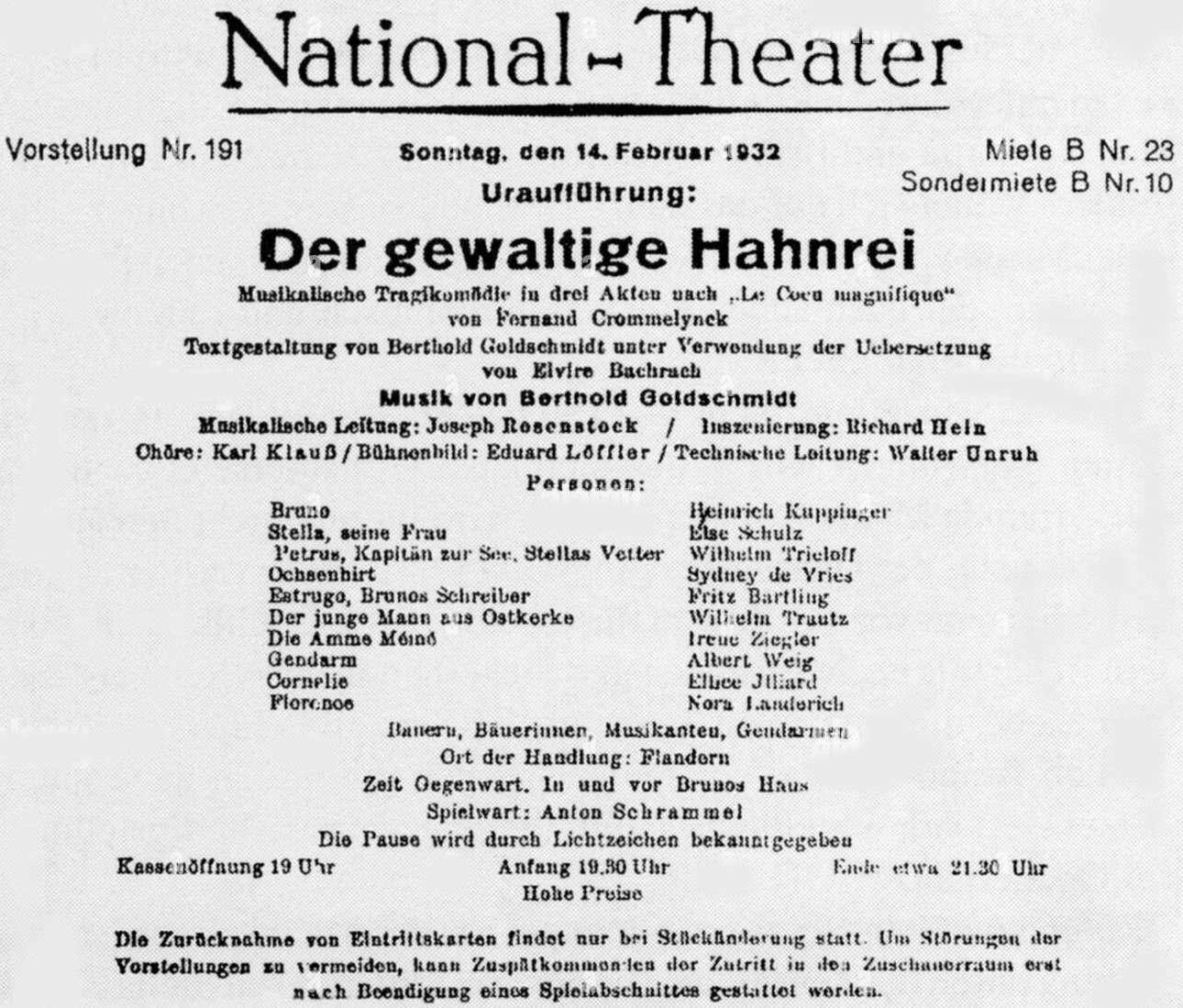
Poster for 1932 Premiere of Berthold Goldschmidt's Opera Der Gewaltige Hahnrei

The Jewish-German composer Berthold Goldschmidt based his 1932 opera Die Gewaltige Hahnrei on the Crommelinck play. When the Nazis came to power, a year later, he relocated to Britain where he would remain until his death.
