= Vladimir Yermilov =

Soviet literary critic and scholar

Vladimir Vladimirovich Yermilov (Russian: Владимир Владимирович Ермилов; 29 October 1904 – 19 November 1965) was a hard line Soviet literary critic and scholar best known for his role in hounding the poet Vladimir Mayakovsky.

== Career ==
Yermilov was born in Moscow, the son of a teacher, who was considered to be a good writer and actor, but who died in 1918. His mother was German. He had only just turned 13 at the time of the October Revolution, but rose very quickly under communism. At age 15, he was editor of the youth newspaper Yunosheskaya Pravda, and head of the press department of the Moscow branch of Komsomol. After graduating from Moscow University in 1924, he was posted to the Urals, but returned to Moscow in 1926, and became a prominent member of the Russian Association of Proletarian Writers (RAPP) and editor of its journal Na Postu (On Guard).

=== Hounding Mayakovsky ===
Initially his relations with Russia's most famous living poet were good. In 1927, a section of Mayakovsky's poem celebrating the tenth anniversary of the Bolshevik Revolution was published in the journal Molodaya Gvardia, which Yermilov edited. Mayakovsky wrote to his lover Lilya Brik saying: "Yermilov sends his regards". But on 9 March 1930, an article by Yermilov, in Pravda attacked the "petit bourgeois 'leftishness'" of writers "who joined the proletariat when its victory had been firmly established" – and included an attack on Mayakovsky's new play, The Bathhouse, although Mayakovsky had supported the Bolsheviks before the revolution. Yermilov alleged that "we hear a false 'leftist' note in Mayakovsky, a note we know not only from literature..."

Yermilov had not seen the play, but was basing his attack on a published excerpt from the script. His reference to a 'false leftist note' implied that Mayakovsky "was a quasi-Trotskyite – in a year when Trotskyites were being rounded up and sent into prison or exile."

Mayakovsky retaliated by creating a huge poster with a four-line slogan saying that there were not enough bathhouses to wash away all the bureaucrats who were aided by critics like Yermilov, and displayed it in the Meyerhold Theatre. Yermilov complained, and Mayakovsky was ordered by the RAPP to take it down. When Mayakovsky committed suicide the following month, he left a note in which he commented: "Tell Yermilov we should have completed the argument."

=== Later career ===
Yermilov was sacked from all the positions he held when Joseph Stalin suddenly ordered RAPP to disband in April 1932, but – unlike RAPP's former leader, Leopold Averbakh, he accepted the decision and by June was sufficiently trusted to be given an editorial position at the magazine Krasnaya Nov. When Averbakh was arrested and shot during the Great Purge, "Yermilov acted as if he had never known Averbakh.". His attacks on writers he targeted were so extreme that even high-ranking Stalinists were shocked. Maxim Gorky, who was chosen by Stalin to chair the Union of Soviet Writers, complained about Yermilov's "professional ignorance", and in January 1936, the secretary of the union, Aleksandr Shcherbakov wrote Stalin a note in which he described Yermilov's "anti-party and ugly behavior". This was because when another speaker at a party meeting had mentioned that a writer had attempted suicide, Yermilov replied: "Let that kind poison themselves, they won't be missed." Vladimir Stavsky thought he behaved like a "prostitute".

Yermilov was sacked from his post at Krasnaya nov in August 1938 for publishing part of a novel about Lenin by Marietta Shaginyan, which had been recommended by Lenin's widow, Nadezhda Krupskaya, but had not been properly approved. After this setback, he worked for the Institute of World Literature, and during the war worked for radio. He continued to write literary criticism. In October 1946, he was appointed editor of the magazine Literaturnaya Gazeta, a sign that he was back in favor. He used this position to help the bogus scientist Trofim Lysenko promote his theories on genetics. When the talented writer Andrei Platonov published his last story The Return, Yermilov wrote an attack that was as long as the story.

In January 1963, he launched an attack on Ilya Ehrenburg over the memoir he had published eight months earlier saying that people had kept quiet about arbitrary arrests in the 1930s. Writing in Izvestia on 30 January, Yermilov claimed that in the 1930s people were shocked by the presence of so many 'enemies of the people', but always spoke up when an innocent person was arrested. Earlier, he welcomed the publication of the short story One Day in the Life of Ivan Denisovich, by Aleksandr Solzhenitsyn – presumably have guessed that it was approved by Nikita Khrushchev – but there is a contemptuous reference to him in Solzhenitsyn's history of the purges, The Gulag Archipelago – "only the Yermilovs believe that people were imprisoned 'for cause'".

When Yermilov died, in 1965, allegedly according to Benedict Sarnov, no-one turned out for his funeral, except the officials whose job was to preside over funerals of members of the Writers' Union. He was buried at the Vvedenskoye Cemetery.
