= Valentin Pluchek =

Soviet and Russian theater director and actor

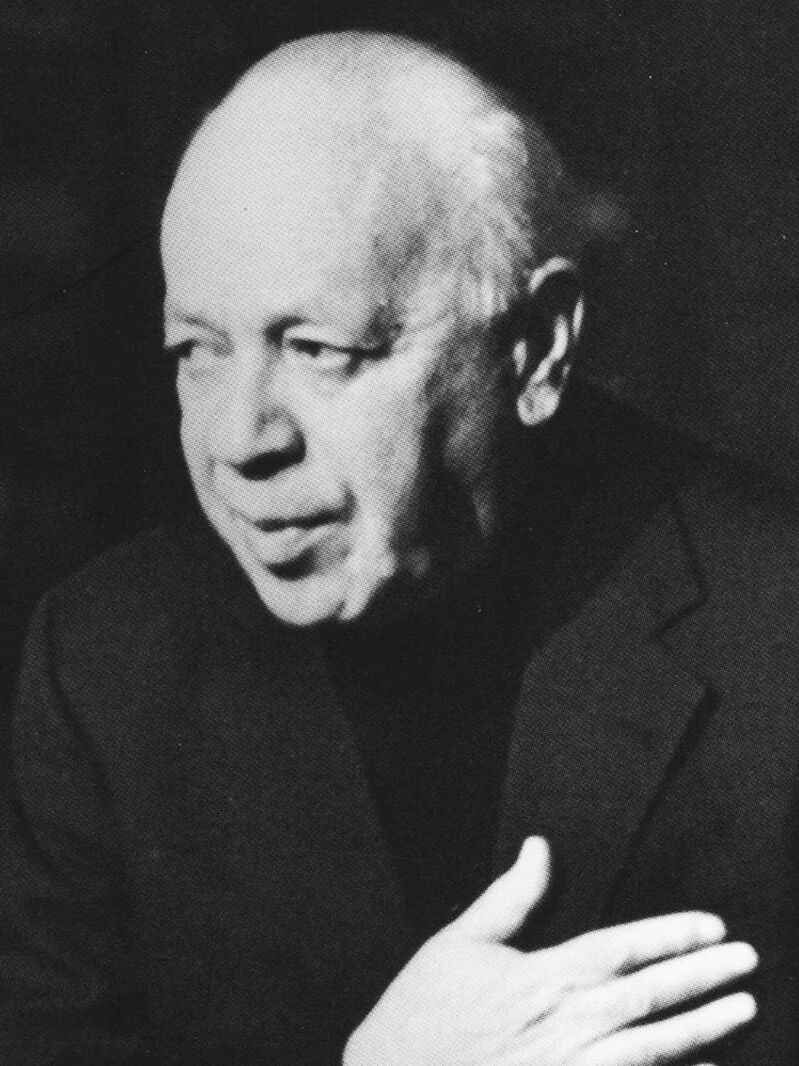
Pluchek in 1973

Valentin Nikolayevich Pluchek (Russian: Валенти́н Никола́евич Плу́чек; real name Isaak Nokhimovich Gintsburg, Russian: Исаа́к Нохи́мович Ги́нцбург; 4 September 1909 – 17 August 2002) was a Soviet and Russian theater director and actor. He is known as a stage director of the Physical Culture Day parade in Moscow during the Stalinist epoch. The Physical Culture Day took place each summer at central squares of major Soviet cities. Peter Brook's cousin.

Pluchek worked with the director Vsevolod Meyerhold until he was arrested and shot in 1940, and then worked with the playwright Aleksei Arbuzov. In 1950, he joined the "often-daring" Moscow Satire Theatre in 1950, and rose to chief director in 1957.

== Awards and honors ==
- Two Orders of the Patriotic War, 2nd class (1945, 1985)
- Honored Artist of the RSFSR (1956)
- People's Artist of the RSFSR (1964)
- Order of the Red Banner of Labour (1970)
- People's Artist of the USSR (1974)
- Order of Friendship of Peoples (1979)
- Order of Lenin (1986)
- Order "For Merit to the Fatherland", 3rd class (1999)
- Jubilee Medal "In Commemoration of the 100th Anniversary of the Birth of Vladimir Ilyich Lenin"
- Medal "For the Defence of the Soviet Transarctic"
- Medal "In Commemoration of the 850th Anniversary of Moscow"

== See also ==
- Vsevolod Meyerhold State Theatre
