= Russian Association of Proletarian Writers =

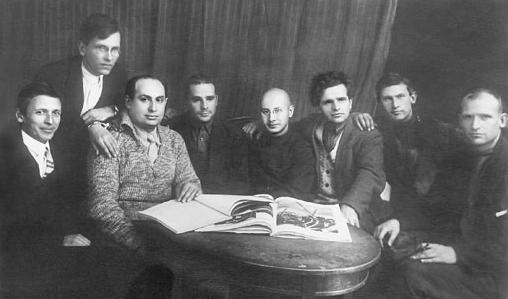
Leadership of the RAPP in the late 1920s. From the left: Alexei Selivanovsky, Mikhail Lusgin, Béla Illés, Vladimir Kirshon, Leopold Averbakh, Fyodor Panferov, Alexander Fadeyev and Ivan Makaryev.

The Russian Association of Proletarian Writers, also known under its transliterated abbreviation RAPP (Russian: Российская ассоциация пролетарских писателей, РАПП) was an official creative union in the Soviet Union established in January 1925.

Among its stated purposes was "to scourge and chastise in the name of the Party", i.e., effectively encouraging censorship of literature on ideological grounds. It became notorious for its enthusiastic attacks on writers who failed to fit the RAPP's definition of the "true Soviet writer", which have eventually earned criticism from the leadership of the Bolshevik Party. Among its first targets were Yevgeny Zamyatin and Boris Pilnyak and both pro and anti-Bolshevik writers were targeted, notably including Mikhail Bulgakov, Maxim Gorki, Vladimir Mayakovsky, and Alexey Tolstoy.

The administration of RAPP consisted of a number of Soviet writers and literary critics. Among them were Leopold Averbakh (founder and general secretary), Vladimir Kirshon, Dmitry Furmanov, Alexander Fadeyev, Alexei Selivanovskiy, Vladimir Stavsky, Yuri Libedinskiy, Fyodor Panferov, Vladimir Yermilov, and others.

In April 1932, RAPP, together with other creative unions such as Proletkult and the Russian Association of Proletarian Musicians, was disbanded and the Union of Soviet Writers was established instead.
