= Kukryniksy =

Soviet art collective

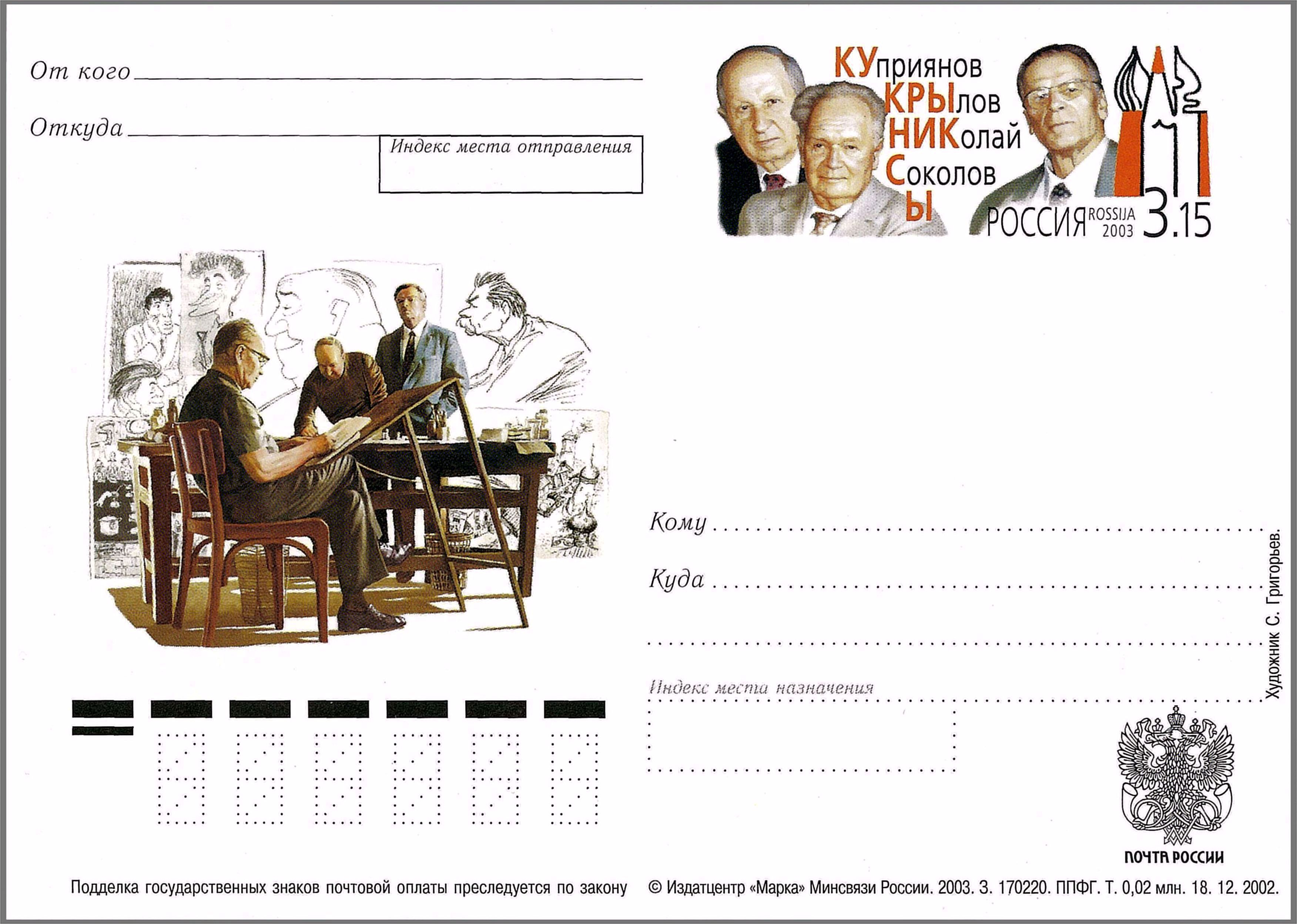
Kukryniksy. Russian postcard of 2003

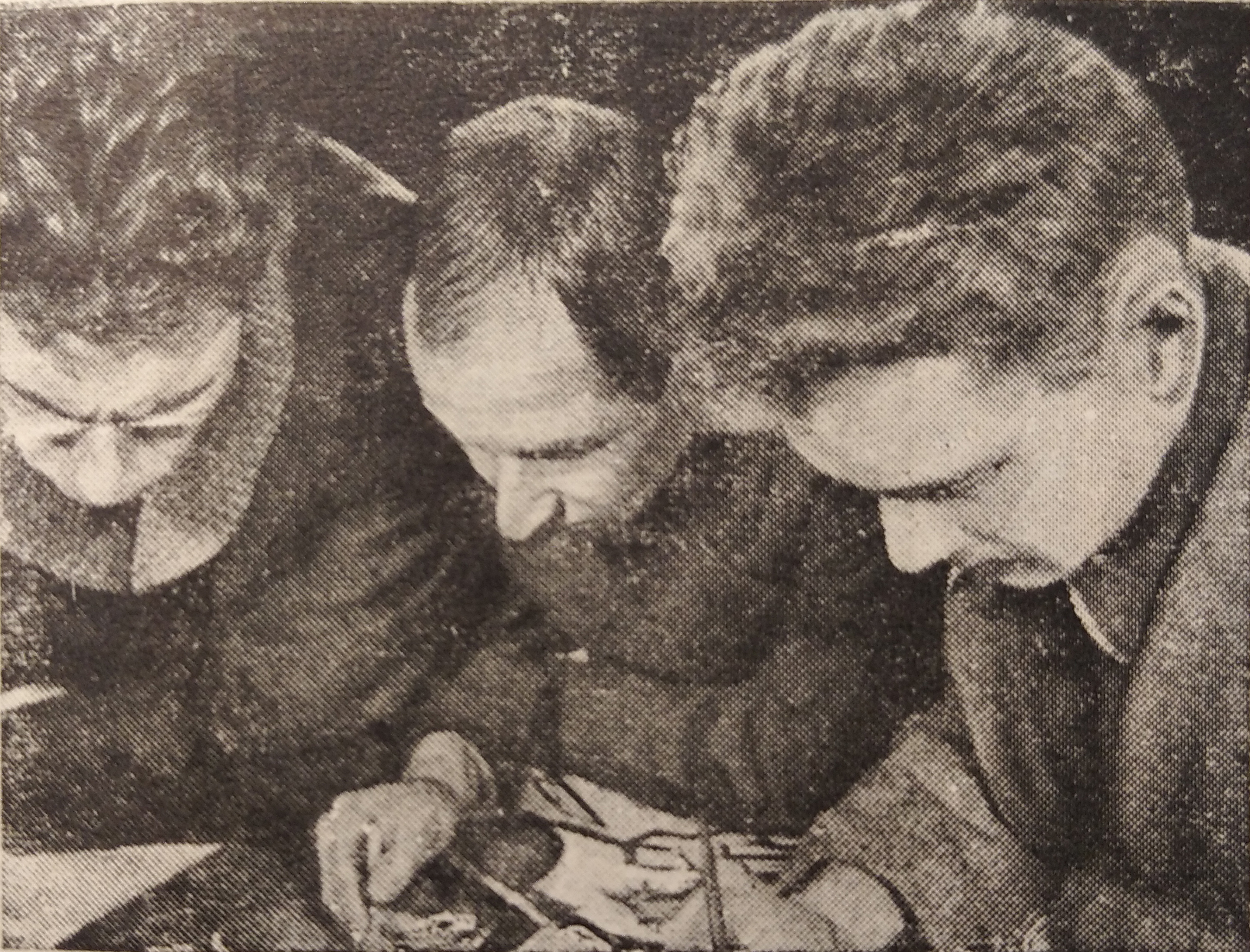
M. Kupriyanov, P. Krylov and N. Sokolov in 1933

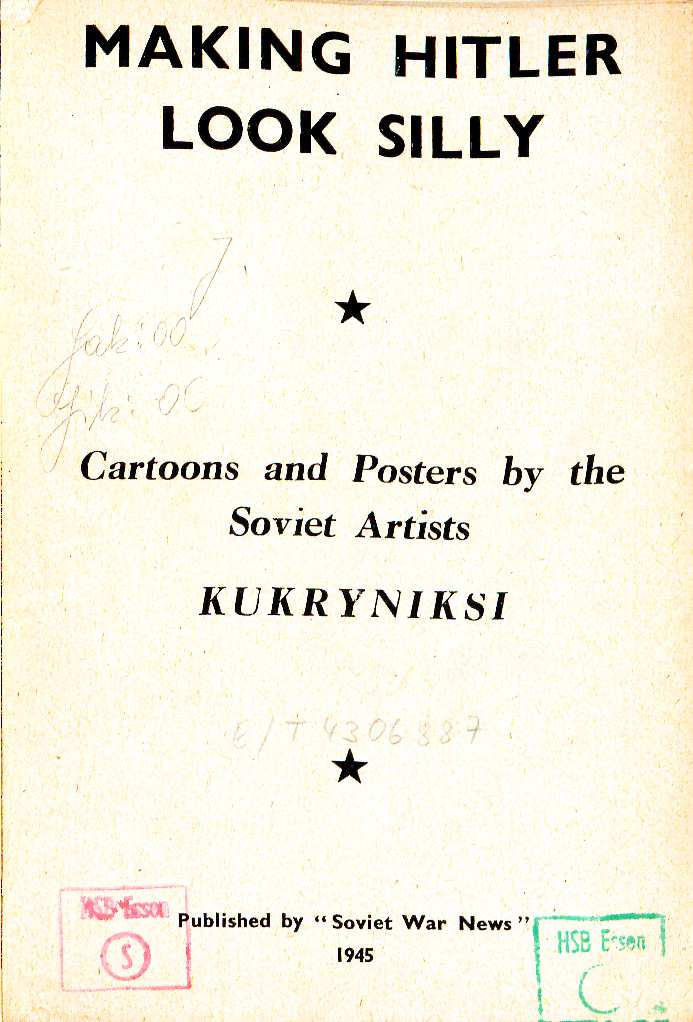
Making Hitler Look Silly 1945

The Kukryniksy (Russian: Кукрыниксы) was three caricaturists/cartoonists in the USSR with a recognizable style.

"Kukryniksy" is a collective name, which is derived from the names of three caricaturists Mikhail Kupriyanov (Михаил Васильевич Куприянов, 1903–1991), Porfiri Krylov (Порфирий Никитич Крылов, 1902–1990), and Nikolai Sokolov (Николай Александрович Соколов, 1903–2000) who had met at VKhUTEMAS, a Moscow art school, in the early 1920s. The three began drawing caricatures under the joint signature in 1924.

They became nationally famous in the 1930s after they began drawing for Krokodil, the Moscow satirical paper, during the rise of fascism. They received international recognition for their attacks on Adolf Hitler, Benito Mussolini, Heinrich Himmler, Joseph Goebbels, and Francisco Franco. During the Second World War, they established the TASS Windows for political cartoons and posters. After the end of the Second World War, they continued to depict politics in their series Cold War (1945–1980s).

They illustrated a number of books, including Ilf and Petrov's, Nikolay Gogol, Mikhail Saltykov-Shchedrin, Anton Chekhov, Maxim Gorky, Nikolai Leskov, Miguel de Cervantes.

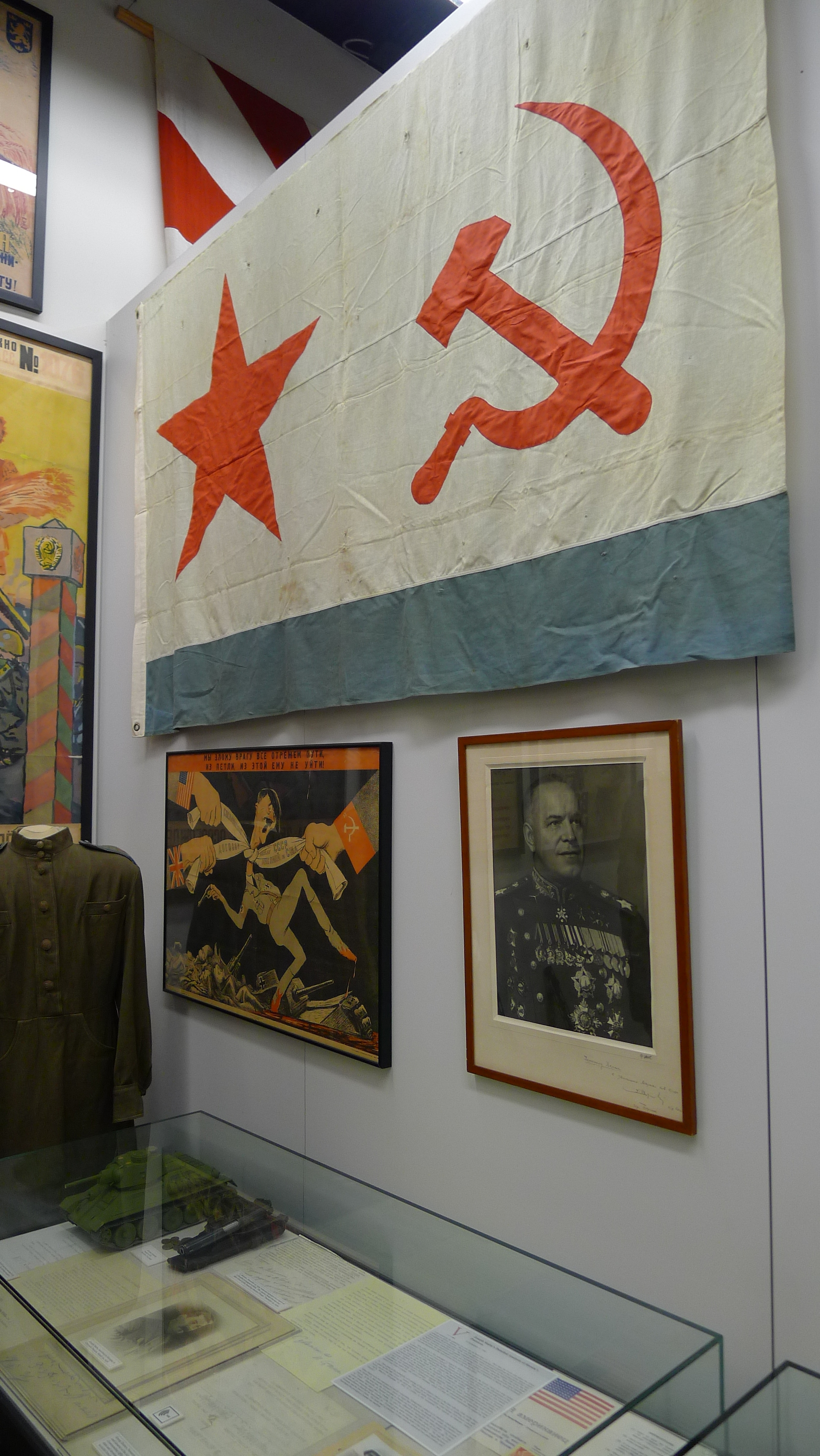
A typical Kukryniksy caricature of Hitler on an Allied propaganda poster from 1942 exhibited in the now-closed International Museum of World War II.

The Kukryniksy are also authors of Socialist Realism-style paintings concerned with historical, political and propaganda topics.

As individuals, they are also known as landscape and portrait artists.

All three were awarded the honorary title of People's Artist of the USSR (1958). They were also recipients of other awards.

There are more than a thousand works of the Kukryniksy in the collection of Alexandre Garese, which have been restored.

== Awards ==
- Lenin Prize (1965)
- Four Stalin Prizes first degree (1942, 1947, 1949, 1951)
- Stalin Prize second degree (1950)
- USSR State Prize (1975)

== Books ==
- Кукрыниксы (1975). Втроём [Kykryniksy. Our three] (in Russian). Moscow: Советский художник.
- Абрамовский, И.П. (1977). "Кукрыниксы" [Kykryniksy]. Смех сильных. О художниках журнала «Крокодил» [Isaak Abramovsky. The laugh of powerful men. About the artist of Krokodil] (in Russian). Moscow: Искусство. pp. 83–97.
