= Zinaida Reich =

Russian actress (1894–1939)

- Зинаида Райх
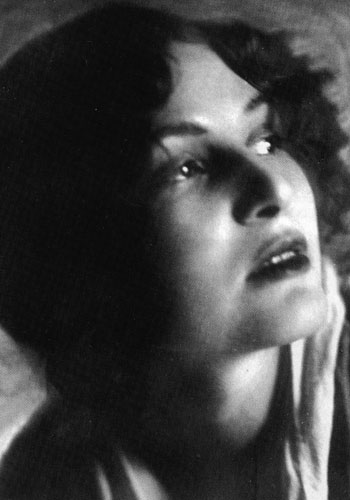
- Born: 3 July 1894; Odessa, Russian Empire
- Died: 15 July 1939 (aged 45); Moscow, Russian SFSR, Soviet Union
- Cause of death: Murder
- Occupation: Actress
- Spouses: Sergey Yesenin (m. 1917; div. 1921); Vsevolod Meyerhold (m. 1922)
- Children: Tatyana and Konstantin

Zinaida Nikolayevna Reich (also spelled Raikh or Raih; Russian: Зинаида Николаевна Райх; 3 July [O.S. 21 June] 1894 – 15 July 1939) was a Russian actress and one of the main stars of the Meyerhold Theatre until it was closed under Joseph Stalin.

Reich married poet Sergey Yesenin and had two children with him. After their divorce, she married the theatre director Vsevolod Meyerhold. In 1939, Meyerhold was arrested by the NKVD, and she was brutally stabbed in her apartment by NKVD agents who staged a robbery.

== Family and early years ==
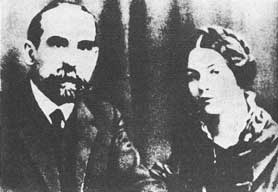
Zinaida Reich with her father, Nikolay (August) Reich, 1917

Zinaida Nikolayevna Reich was born in the village of Blizhniye Melnitsy near Odessa.

Her mother was Anna Ivanovna Viktorova, a Russian noblewoman and niece of a notable Russian linguist and archaeologist, Alexey Viktorov. Her father was of German descent, August Reich, who worked as a sailor and a railroad engineer. In order to marry Anna, August Reich (originally a Roman Catholic) accepted Orthodox Christianity and was baptised as Nikolay Andreyevich Reich.

August Reich was an early social democrat and had been twice politically exiled to the North of Russia prior to meeting Anna. As he continued his activity, during the Russian Revolution of 1905, the family was exiled from Odessa to Bendery.

Zinaida Reich studied in a gymnasium in Bendery but was expelled for her political activities before completing the eighth (last) grade. She enrolled in the Kiev Higher Education Courses for Women, and in 1913, she became a member of the Socialist-Revolutionary Party.

She worked as a technical editor for Delo Naroda ('People's Cause'), a newspaper of the Socialist-Revolutionary Party. There she met the poet Sergey Yesenin, who at that time was influenced by the Party. Yesenin settled in Saint Petersburg in March 1917.

== Marriage to Sergey Yesenin ==
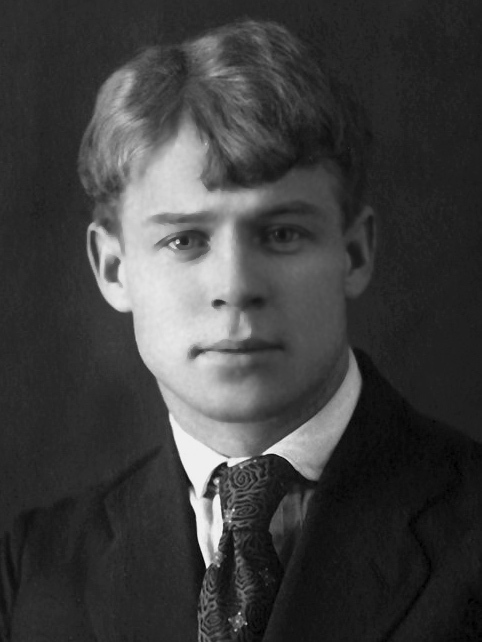
Sergey Yesenin, 1922

In spring 1917, Reich met Sergey Yesenin. The young people fell in love. They travelled to the White Sea and Russian North and got married in Kiriko-Ulitovskaya Church near Vologda on 4 August 1917. After the wedding, the couple moved to Oryol, where her parents lived.

In September 1917, the couple returned to Saint Petersburg, where Reich worked for the People's Commissariat for Food (NarkomProd). In 1918, the People's Commissariat moved to Moscow and so did the couple. As Zinaida was pregnant, she moved to be with her parents in Oryol while Yesenin continued his literary career in Moscow.

Reich returned to Moscow when their daughter, Tatiana, was one year old, but she and Yesenin quarrelled. In February 1920 Reich gave birth to their son Konstantin, but the couple continued to live separately. At that time Reich lived in a shelter for mothers with infants. On 5 October 1921 Zinaida Reich and Sergey Yesenin were officially divorced.

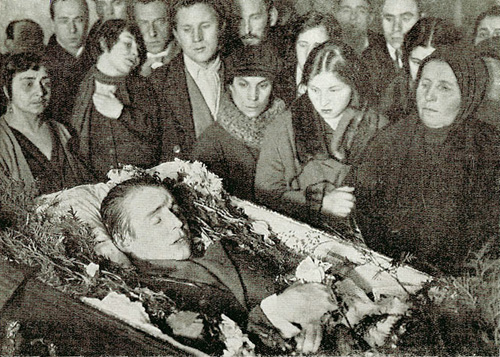
Sergey Yesenin in his coffin, 1925. The woman second to the left, hand raised, is Zinaida Reich. Her second husband Vsevolod Meyerhold is behind her right shoulder.

The story of the couple is known from the memoir Novel without Lies (Russian: Роман без вранья; 1926), written by Yesenin's close friend, room-mate and allegedly homosexual lover, Anatoly Marienhof. Marienhof described Reich as a "crummy Jewish dame with fleshy lips on a face round as a dinner-plate". He wrote that Yesenin allegedly was upset when he saw his black-haired son, Konstantin. "No Yesenin had ever been black-haired", he allegedly said.

Reich had dark hair, which is genetically dominant over light hair. Historians have doubted that Marienhof's description of Reich is accurate. She was of German-Russian ancestry and Russian Orthodox by faith.

== Marriage to Meyerhold ==
Reich studied at the State Experimental Theatre Workshops, headed by famous theatrical director Vsevolod Meyerhold. Meyerhold was 20 years older than her; at the time he had been married for 25 years to his wife Olga and had three daughters with her. He ended up getting a divorce, and Reich and Meyerhold married in 1922. Yesenin often broke into the house of Meyerholds demanding to see his former wife and children. Reich and Yesenin met secretly in her friend's apartment.

== Star of Meyerhold Theatre ==
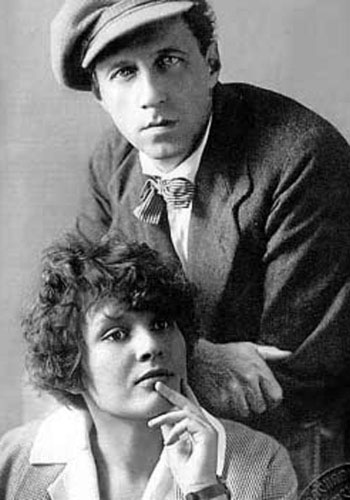
Vsevolod Meyerhold and Zinaida Reich

Reich worked as an actress and was featured as a star of the Meyerhold Theatre from 1923 until her death in 1939. According to the theatre critic N. Volkov:

The works of Vsevolod Meyerhold of the 1920s and 1930s cannot be understood without Zinaida Reich ... In all his productions, Meyerhold was building 'mise en scenes' to feature Zinaida Reich ... If he was afraid that Zinaida would not manage her part, he would create beneficial 'mise en scenes' for her... Together with Meyerhold, Reich traveled his creative path: from experiments in biomechanics to deeper psychologism"..

Not everyone accepted that a young actress with no experience had become the star of the famous theatre. According to Anatoly Marienhof, when Meyerhold had suggested that he would make Reich a great actress, Marienhof said he might as well invent electric lamps. Marienhof wrote that one needed no talent to become a famous actress – only Meyerhold as the husband and idiots as the public. The actor Igor Ilyinsky was so upset that Reich received all the major roles that he left the Meyerhold Theater. Later, he revised his opinion of her acting talent and appreciated her.

== Murder ==
In the early 1930s, as Stalin repressed all avant-garde art and experimentation, the government declared Meyerhold's work as antagonistic and alien to the Soviet people. His theatre was closed down in January 1938. The ailing Konstantin Stanislavski, then the director of an opera theatre (now known as Stanislavsky and Nemirovich-Danchenko Music Theatre), invited Meyerhold to lead his company.

Stanislavski died in August 1938. Meyerhold directed his theatre for nearly a year until he was arrested in Leningrad on 20 June 1939. Twenty-five days later, his wife Zinaida Reich was found dying in their Moscow apartment on 15 July 1939.

Two unknown assailants broke into the Reich-Meyerhold apartment during the night of 14–15 July. They stabbed her 17 times, including through the eyes. She died of severe blood loss early the next morning, 15 July. Reich had sent both her children out of the apartment that night, and nothing was taken from the apartment. The murder is generally regarded as having been organized by the NKVD.

According to Arkadiy Vaksberg, "Beria needed this sadistic farce" because the actress was extraordinarily popular, independent, outspoken and known for saying: "if Stalin can make no sense of art, let him ask Meyerhold, and he will explain".

Zinaida Reich was buried at Vagankovo Cemetery near the grave of her first husband, Sergey Yesenin. As Meyerhold was executed by the NKVD on 2 February 1940 after a confession from torture, the location of his remains is not known. Supporters erected a memorial to him at Reich's gravesite.

Her Moscow apartment was given to the chauffeur of Lavrentiy Beria, who had just become head of the NKVD. Since the collapse of the Soviet Union, the whole apartment has been restored. It is now maintained and operated as the Meyerhold Museum.

Reich's daughter, Tatyana (1918–1992), became a notable writer. Her son Konstantin (1920–1986) became a journalist and a prominent football statistician.

== See also ==
- Vsevolod Meyerhold State Theatre
