= Andrew Bromfield =

British editor and translator

Andrew Bromfield is a British editor and translator of Russian literature into English. He was a founding editor of the Russian literature journal Glas in 1991, and has translated into English works by Boris Akunin, Vladimir Voinovich, Irina Denezhkina, Victor Pelevin, and Sergei Lukyanenko, among other writers.

== Life and career ==
Bromfield was born in Hull, Yorkshire. He began his career as a literary translator in Moscow during perestroika.

At Glas, he worked with Natalia Perova as the journal's first co-editor. His translations of Pelevin for the journal led to commissions from larger publishers to translate Pelevin's novels.

His 2007 translation of Leo Tolstoy's War and Peace was based on a reconstructed early draft of the novel, which has a different ending from the final text.

== Selected translations ==
Victor Pelevin

Stories, novellas and collections

- The Blue Lantern
- Bulldozer Driver's Day
- Crystal World
- Hermit and Six-Toes
- The Life and Adventures of Shed Number XII
- Mid-Game
- News from Nepal
- Nika
- The Ontology of Childhood
- Prince of Gosplan
- Sleep
- Tai Shou Chuan USSR (A Chinese folk tale)
- The Tambourine of the Upper World
- The Tarzan Swing
- Vera Pavlovna's Ninth Dream
- A Werewolf Problem in Central Russia
- The Yellow Arrow

Novels

- The Life of Insects
- Omon Ra
- Clay Machine Gun (Chapayev and Void, Buddha's Little Finger)
- Homo Zapiens (Babylon, Generation ''П'')
- The Helmet of Horror: The Myth of Theseus and the Minotaur
- The Sacred Book of the Werewolf

Dmitry Glukhovsky

- Metro 2033 (new translation, 2025)
- Metro 2034
- Metro 2035

Boris Akunin

- The Winter Queen
- Murder on the Leviathan
- The Turkish Gambit
- The Death of Achilles
- Special Assignments
- The State Counsellor
- The Coronation
- Pelagia and the White Bulldog
- Pelagia and the Black Monk
- Pelagia and the Red Rooster

Sergei Lukyanenko

- Night Watch
- Day Watch
- Twilight Watch
- Last Watch
- The New Watch
- Sixth Watch

Mikhail Bulgakov

- Dead Man's Memoir
- Dog's Heart

Other works

- Incidences by Daniil Kharms
- Very Short Stories by Genrikh Sapgir
- Monday Starts on Saturday by Boris and Arkady Strugatsky
- Rachmaninov by Nikolai Bazhanov
- The Law of Eternity by Nodar Dumbadze
- War and Peace: Original Version by Leo Tolstoy (2007)
- Glas: New Russian Writing magazine (ed. by Natalia Perova)
- Lizka and Her Men by Alexander Ikonnikov
- The Good Angel of Death by Andrey Kurkov
- Maxim and Fyodor by Vladimir Shinkarev
- Reasons for Living by Dmitry Bakin
- Witch's Tears by Nina Sadur
- Headcrusher by Alexander Garros and Aleksei Evdokimov
- Solar Plexus: A Baku Saga In Four Parts by Rustam Ibrahimbekov

== Translation approach ==
In a 2007 interview, Bromfield described his approach to translation:

My job is to provide the readers of a translation with an experience which is as close as possible to the experience that the author provides to readers of the original — the author's authentic voice and relationship to his characters (and readers) should come across in the same way in a translation. Also, the translated text should, ideally, read just as naturally as the original (and conversely, if an author doesn't read comfortably in the original, that should be reflected in the translation).
