= Blue Lantern (short story collection) =

Short story collection by Viktor Pelevin

- First edition (Russian)
- Author: Victor Pelevin
- Original title: Синий фонарь
- Language: Russian
- Genre: Short stories
- Publisher: Текст
- Publication date: 1991
- Publication place: Russia
- Media type: Print (Paperback)
- Pages: 320 pp
- ISBN: 5-85950-013-0

Blue Lantern (Russian: Синий фонарь) is a short story collection by Victor Pelevin, published in 1991 in Russia. In 1994 it was published in English named Blue Lantern and Other Stories by New Directions Publishing. Named after the story "Blue Lantern" which was included in the collection.

== Plot ==
For Victor Pelevin's short prose the main cycle-forming principle is the subjective mystical-philosophical orientation common to all the stories. The title of Pelevin's first collection was given by the story of the same name "Blue Lantern", where the image of the blue lantern acts as a mystical symbol of the netherworld, or rather the illusory border between the two worlds. The image of the blue lantern is found in most of the stories in the cycle.

The common philosophical theme that unites the majority of the stories in the cycle is the understanding of death as the beginning of a new life. In the story "The Blue Lantern" the characters playfully pose serious philosophical questions: what is death, who is called a dead man and who really is a dead man? However, the expected denouement at the end of the story does not happen: neither the heroes nor the author receive answers to the questions posed. But in the tradition of Russian classical literature for Pelevin is more important not to get an answer to the question, but the formulation of the question itself.

If in the story "Blue Lantern" the author leaves these questions open, in essence only poses these questions, then in the story "The Life and Adventure of Shed Number XII" the life story of the main character serves in part as an answer to the questions posed about the meaning of existence. The main character in the story is the shed who undergoes an inner evolution that leads him to the spiritual freedom that allows him to realize his cherished dream of transformation. His dream of becoming a bicycle. Spiritual improvement, natural giftedness, subtle inner organization of the protagonist in the perception and understanding of the world around him leads him to the realization of the long-awaited dream. Thus, death in the story is understood as a peculiar step in achieving spiritual freedom, the beginning of true and real life. It is noteworthy that in this case Pelevin's hero is an inanimate object - a shed. If in the first story children asked eternal questions, here the object is inanimate, far from poetic, but the author gives it the possibility not only to think, but also to dream, the father-in-law not simply spiritualizes, but creates a model of a thinking and deep being.

The composition and plot of the story are built in the tradition of a magical or domestic fairy tale: the heroes are inanimate beings who are endowed with the ability to think and reason like humans, and in the finale there is a long-awaited transformation into fairy magic. Along with this, however, the metaphorization and philosophical orientation of the narrative somewhat transform the fairy tale in terms of genre and give the text a parable rather than a fairy tale proper. Moreover, inanimate objects exist in this parable-fairytale space along with people, whose lives run parallel and independent of the life of the shed.

The unity of the texts of Pelevin's cycle "Blue Lantern", his mystical worldview are supported not only at the level of fairy tale character system, but also with the help of folklore motifs. Thus, in the story "Crystal World" the names of the main characters Yuri Popovich and Nikolai Muromtsev refer to the names of the heroes of Russian bylina, who are the patrons of the Russian land, Alyosha Popovich and Ilya Muromets.

The story "A Werewolf Problem in Central Russia" throughout the narrative continues to develop the folklore components of the Pelevin cycle, and again unobtrusively but insistently meets folklore images and motifs. First of all, the hero named Sasha, drawn by an unconscious desire, goes on a long journey in search of a certain vision (the view from the photo in the encyclopedia). And this desire correlates with the actions of the fairy-tale-folklore hero of Russian folk tales: to go there without knowing where, to see that without knowing what. In Pelevin's story, the hero is destined to become a chosen werewolf, a werewolf hero. The magical transformation of Sasha into a werewolf is described as a process of the hero's comprehension of the truth, previously unknown to him.

In the story "Mardongi" through the theory of a certain philosopher Antonov about the nurturing of the inner dead by each living person continues to implement Pelevin's idea of eternity and the single essence of the human spirit and flesh, the living and the dead in the universe. According to Pelevin's Antonov, from the moment of birth every living person begins to nurture death, a corpse, because continuation of life leads to inevitable approach to death. Life and death in Pelevin's philosophy turn out to be communicating vessels, those two entities that are inseparable from each other. Despite the author's ironic stance, the underlying meaning of Pelevin's story turns out to be far from humorous. The popular phrase about the duality of light and darkness, right and left, life and death finds its philosophical realization in the author's text.

The hero of the story "Sleep" Nikita Sonechkin is not aware of the boundary (or gradually loses the idea of the boundary) between dream and reality.

The interchangeability of sleep and wakefulness, life and death, birth and death in Pelevin's stories loses its tragic intensity and becomes an objective component of human existence as a whole: it is impossible to understand whether life or dream, death or dream, day or night (dream time) is more real in the world of Pelevin's stories.

The interchangeability of sleep and wakefulness, life and death, birth and death in Pelevin's stories loses its tragic intensity and becomes an objective component of human existence as a whole: to understand what is more real than life or sleep, death or sleep, day or night (dream time) in the world of Pelevin's stories is not possible.

In the writer's stories not only sleep, delirium, drugs or alcohol are the means of transition into an otherworldly state; in his post-Soviet space this role can also be played by television, the speech of a lecturer, the media, and a whole slew of other media.

In most of the stories in this collection the protagonists' perception of the world is ambiguous; familiar, objective reality is represented as a dream or death, a dream/death replaces reality, and reality, in turn, is deprived of its usual contours. For some of the stories in the collection, in which the author ironizes the Soviet state system, it is the Soviet reality that the heroes are a monstrous dream. For example, the heroes of "News from Nepal" are in a similar state of sleep-forgetfulness, ruled by some demonic force and equated with hell.

As in most of the works in the collection, in the story "Uhryab" the main character at a certain point realizes the meaninglessness and emptiness of the world around him. And he must come to terms with it. But to come to terms with it not because he is a victim of the Soviet system, but because for Pelevin and his hero, who accepts the world in all its manifestations (life = death, life = dream, dream = death, day = night, dream = reality), there is no other way out. The exit in the usual sense is impossible because at any outcome Pelevin's hero will find himself only in the same world, only with a different name.

In the story "The Ontology of Childhood" Pelevin continues his search for answers to the eternal questions stated in most of the stories in the collection. The adult protagonist in this work is vividly alive those childhood impressions, when as a child he enthusiastically perceived reality, and the overwhelming thirst for comprehension of the world around him seized him. For the hero, the resurrection of the emotions of childhood is his only happiness. As a child, he is free and easy to contemplate his surroundings, to understand the world as God (it seems) created it, but as he grows up, he realizes that gradually the colors of the world around him fade. Pelevin's reflections on the meaning and truth of existence lead him to the idea that the measure of happiness does not depend on man, it is inherent in being. Thus, and in this story, Pelevin actually arrives at a Buddhist understanding of the meaning of existence to the absence of all rational meaning: life for the sake of life.

The author's mystical-fantastical two-world is realized in the stories of the collection not only in the recognition of the heroes false and finding true reality, or awareness of the illusory edges between realities. The author forces the reader through the contradictions and searches of his characters to doubt the present, which is based on materialism and pragmatism, he reminds the reader of the true purpose of man, who can exist in harmony with himself only in the awareness of its inseparable connection with the forces of cosmic reality.

== Collected Stories ==
- The Life and Adventure of Shed Number XII
- Hermit and Six-Toes
- A Werewolf Problem in Central Russia
- Prince of Central Planning
- Sleep
- News from Nepal
- Vera Pavlovna's Ninth Dream
- Blue Lantern
- Tai Shou Chuan USSR
- Mardongi
- Bulldozer Driver's Day
- The Ontology of Childhood
- Built-in Reminder
- Mid-Game
- Nika (was printed only in an English collection of short stories, in Russian it was first printed in another collection of short stories)
- The Tambourine of the Upper World (was printed only in an English collection of short stories, in Russian it was first printed in another collection of short stories)
- Crystal World
- Weapon of Retaliation
- Uhryab
- Music from the Pillar
- Kreger’s Revelation
- The Reconstructor
