= A Werewolf Problem in Central Russia =

1991 short story by Victor Pelevin

- Author: Victor Pelevin
- Language: Russian
- Genre: Short story
- Publication date: 1991
- Publication place: Russia
- Media type: Print (Paperback)
- ISBN: 0811213943

A Werewolf Problem in Central Russia (Russian: «Проблема верволка в средней полосе») is a short story by Victor Pelevin, published in 1991 in Russian.

In 1998, New Directions Publishing published a short story collection, ''A Werewolf Problem in Central Russia and Other Stories''.

== Plot ==
In the center of the narrative - the werewolves living in Russia. A character named Sasha, driven by an unconscious desire, sets out on a long journey in search of a certain vision he saw in an encyclopedia illustration.

Throughout the story, folkloric imagery and motifs persist throughout.

And this desire correlates with the actions of a fairy-tale folklore hero: to go there without knowing where, to see that without knowing what. Moreover, once there (who knows where), Sasha finds himself in a movie, in a certain (almost fairy-tale-like, mysterious) half-empty hall, in the company of a grandfather, whose whistle had something of a nightingale-robber, something of the departing ancient Russia. Looking for a place to spend the night, the hero comes to the conclusion that the grandmothers who let them spend the night usually live in the same places as the nightingales, bandits and koshchei, although the kolkhoz "Michurinsky" is not a less magical concept, if you think about it.

Like a fairy tale hero, Pelevin's character unnoticeably finds himself at a crossroads. As in a fairy tale, the hero is faced with a choice: you go right... you go left.... And this choice, as in a traditional fairy tale, serves as a kind of sign of the importance of those events that will happen to the hero, an important, but not yet known to him goal. In Pelevin's story, the hero is destined to become a chosen werewolf, a werewolf hero.

The magical transformation of Sasha into a werewolf is described as a process of comprehension of the hero of the truth, previously unknown to him. It was at this moment that Sasha realized that his whole life was nothing more than a dream. Through transformation into a werewolf, the hero is reborn, gaining the true meaning of existence. All his previous worldview is perceived as a meaningless dream.

It is no accident that the author places his hero in the middle belt of Russia, and it is not only a geographical term (the narrative begins with the fact that Sasha finds himself in the village of Konkovo near Moscow), but also philosophical, the hero is shown in the middle of his life journey.

The author brings the reader into the mystical world gradually. The hero notices "a faint, uncertain nature of light," moonlight. The word "moon" in Pelevin's text is capitalized, as the name of some deity personifying the otherworldly force. The word "moon" appears initially with a small letter in the text, and only when Sasha finds himself in the clearing with the verwolves does it appear with a capital letter. We can assume that the author wanted to emphasize that only next to werewolves the hero got into another world, where the moon is the supreme force.

Soon Sasha turns into a werewolf. He becomes a full-fledged member of the pack when he defeats the werewolf Nikolai, who led an unworthy wolf lifestyle, in a duel. As a result of becoming a wolf, Sasha's self-consciousness undergoes a change. He realizes that his previous life was only a dream, and now he has awakened. Sasha achieves harmony with the world around him. At the end, it turns out that he was predisposed to such a transformation from the very beginning (he was looking for a picture of a wolf).

The Werewolves are positive characters in the story. They are at odds with the owl-werewolves, who represent evil.

The author touches on interesting questions that have already been asked before in Russian classical literature. The hero of his work makes an attempt to realize his purpose, the purpose of modern man in the modern world. He asks the questions "What am I", "Who are we", "What is this world"? But the author does not give answers to these questions, he through the interaction of the two worlds, real and fairy tale, through the clash of the mystical and folklore, creates a picture of his modern world. And the main character of the story, Sasha, in the image of a werewolf - a man-wolf - for a moment (or now forever) reaches an understanding of the world and harmony with it.

== Short story collection ''A Werewolf Problem in Central Russia and Other Stories'' ==
In 1998, New Directions Publishing published a short story collection, ''A Werewolf Problem in Central Russia and Other Stories''. All the works are united by a mystical theme. The book consists of eight stories written by the writer in the early 1990s.

- A Werewolf Problem in Central Russia
- Vera Pavlovna's Ninth Dream
- Sleep
- Tai Shou Chuan USSR
- The Tarzan Swing
- The Ontology of Childhood
- Bulldozer Driver's Day
- Prince of Gosplan
