= List of people from Novosibirsk =

Coat of Arms of Novosibirsk

This is a list of notable people who were born or have lived in Novosibirsk (1893–1926: Novonikolayevsk), Russia.

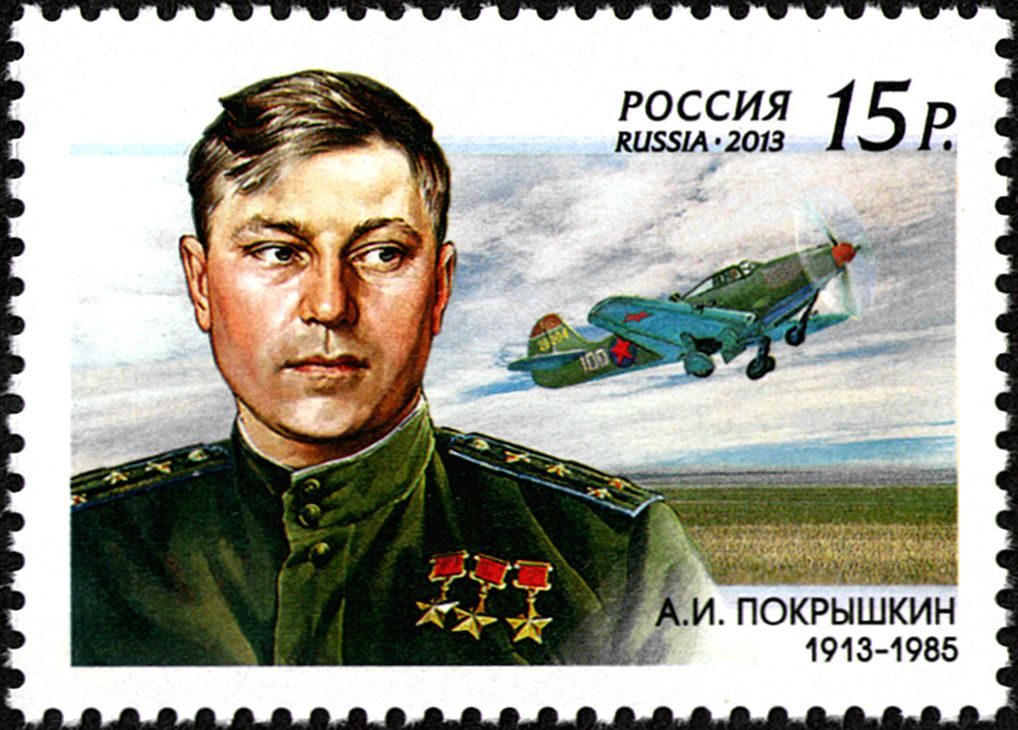
Alexander Pokryshkin (1913–1985)

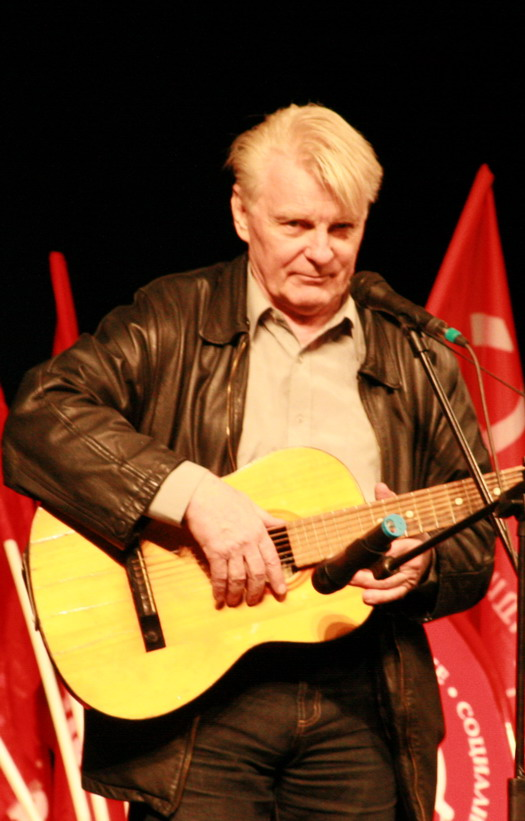
Yuriy Nazarov (born 1937)

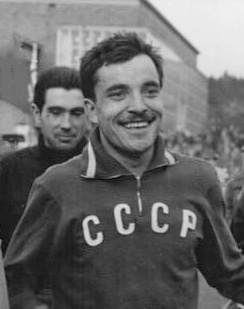
Gainan Saidkhuzhin (1937–2015)

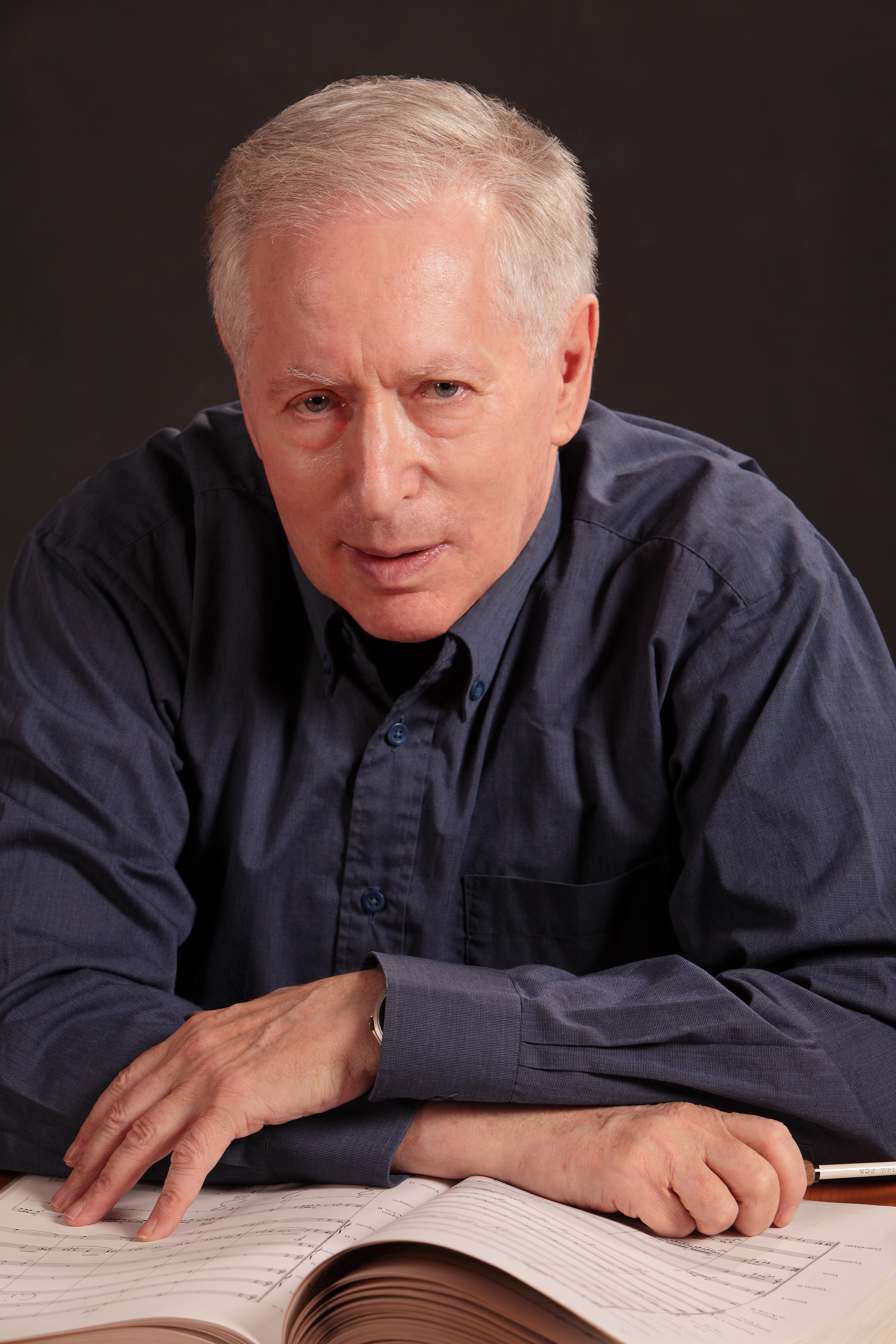
Thomas Sanderling (born 1942)

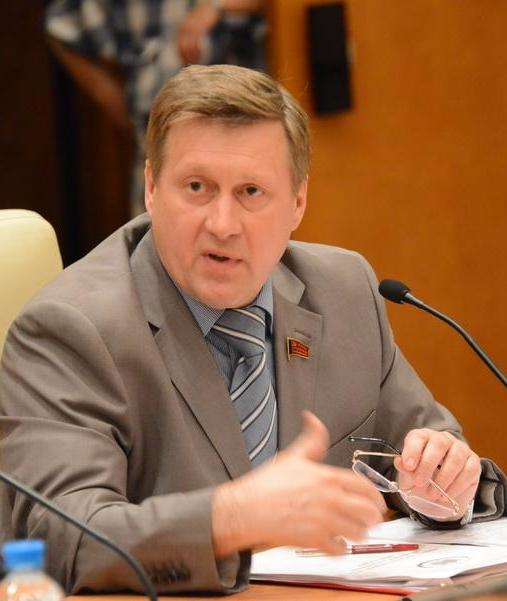
Anatoly Lokot (born 1959)

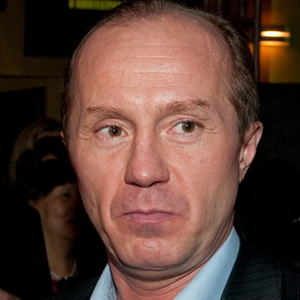
Andrei Panin (1962–2013)

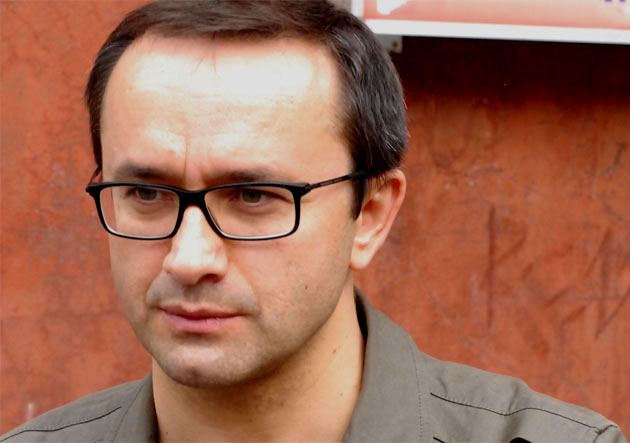
Andrey Zvyagintsev (born 1964)

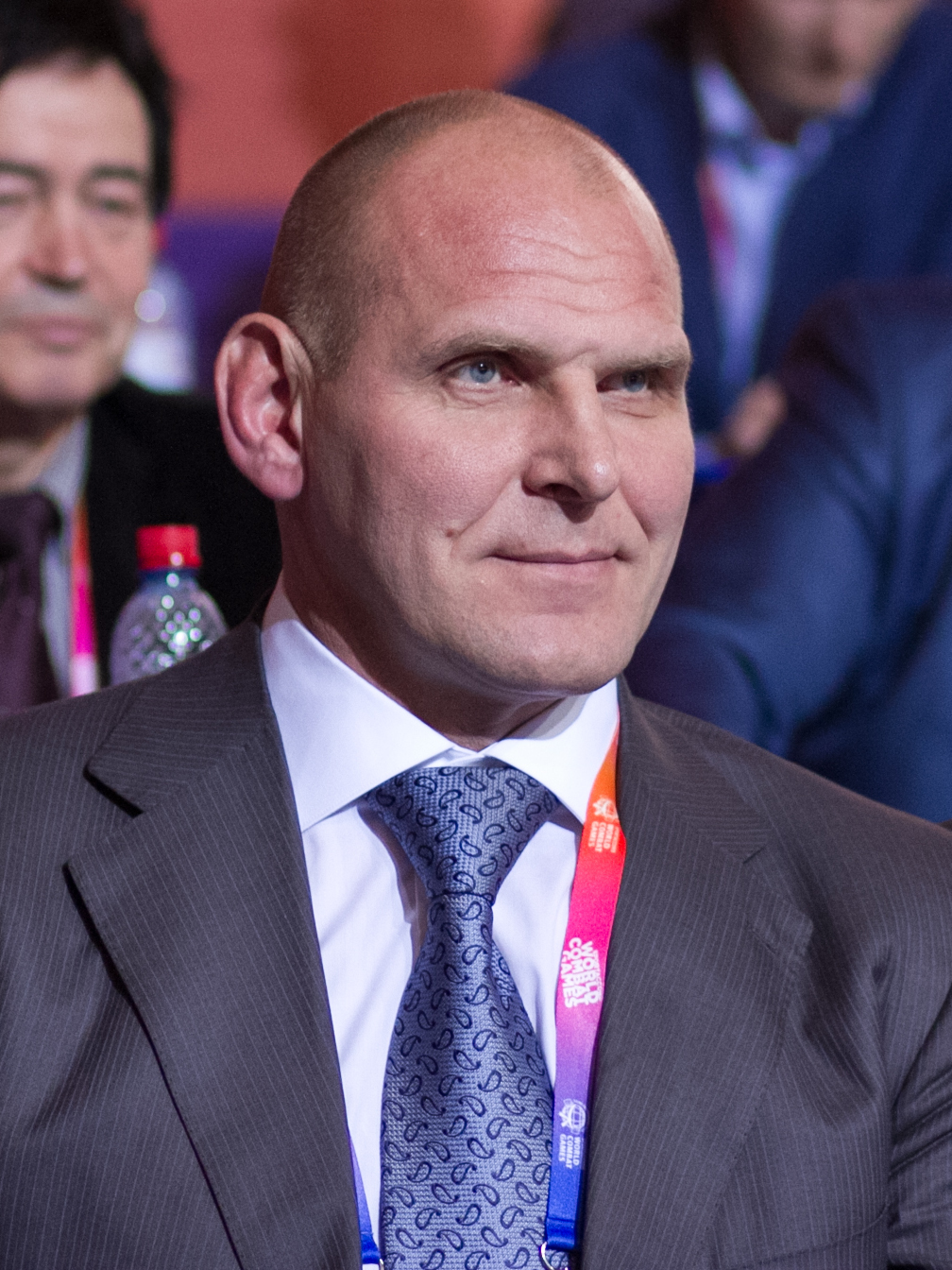
Aleksandr Karelin (born 1967)

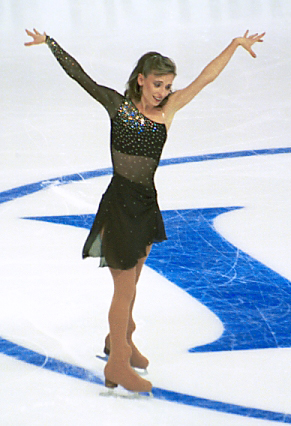
Tatiana Malinina (born 1973)

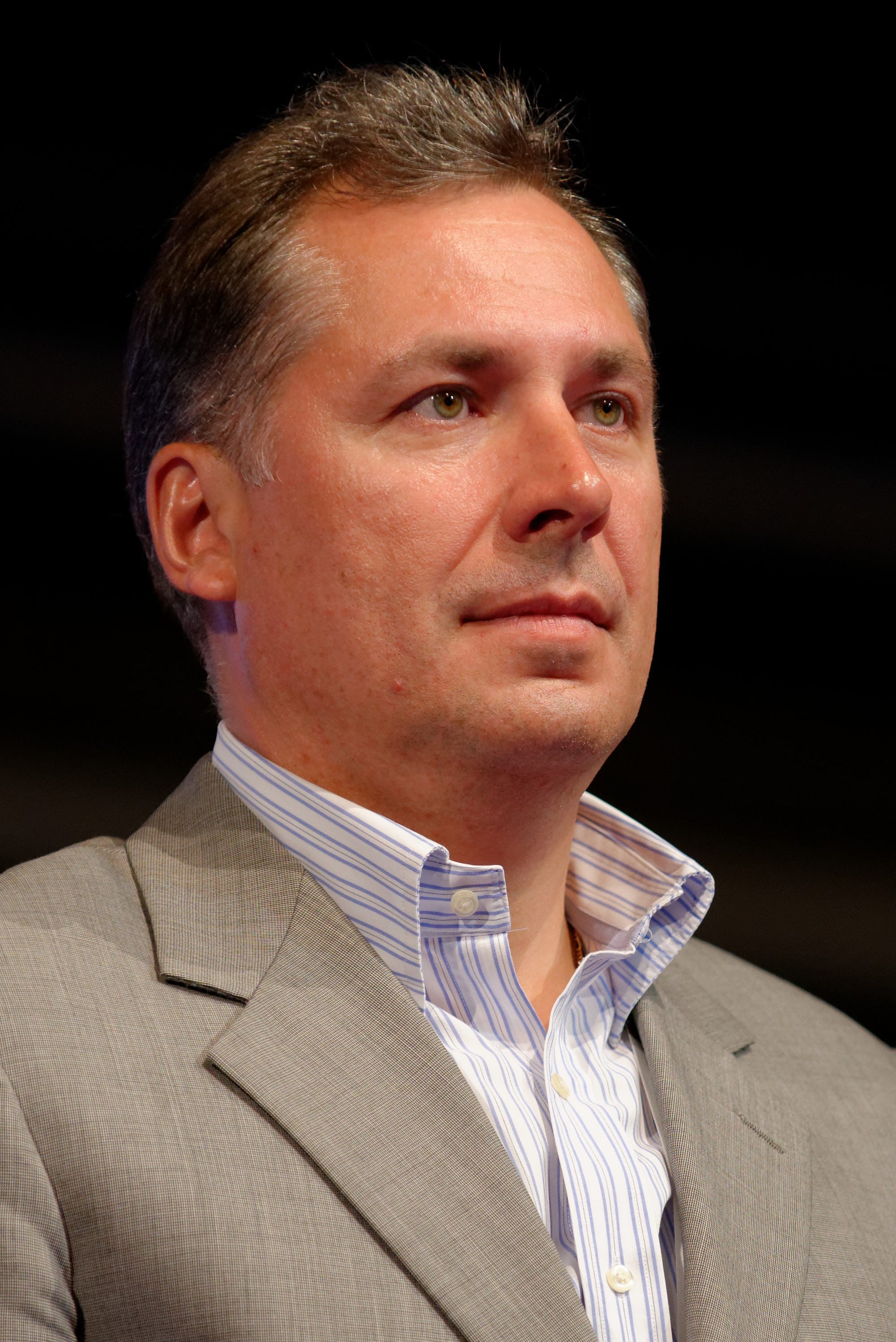
Stanislav Pozdnyakov (born 1973)

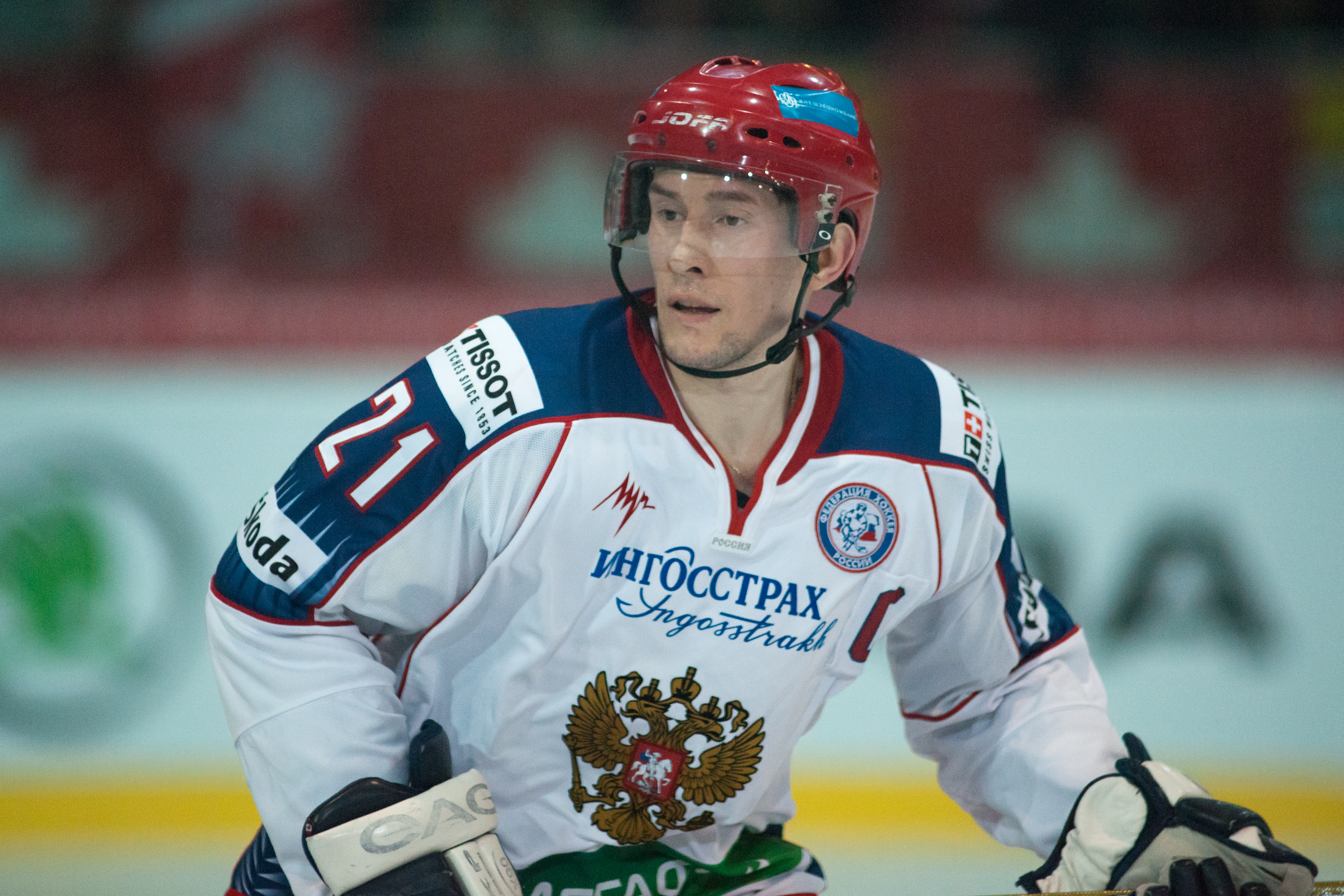
Konstantin Gorovikov (born 1977)

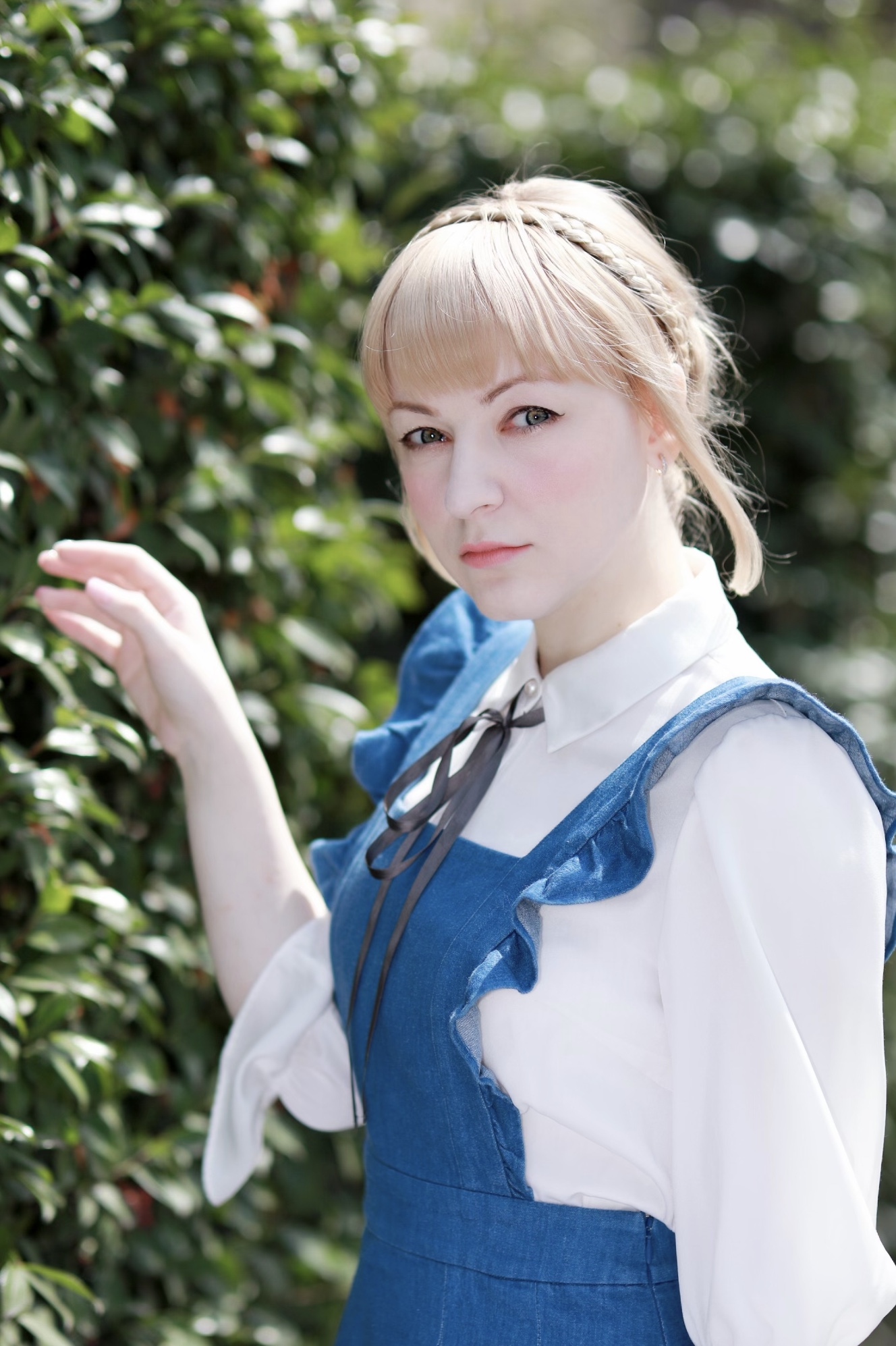
Jenya (born 1981)

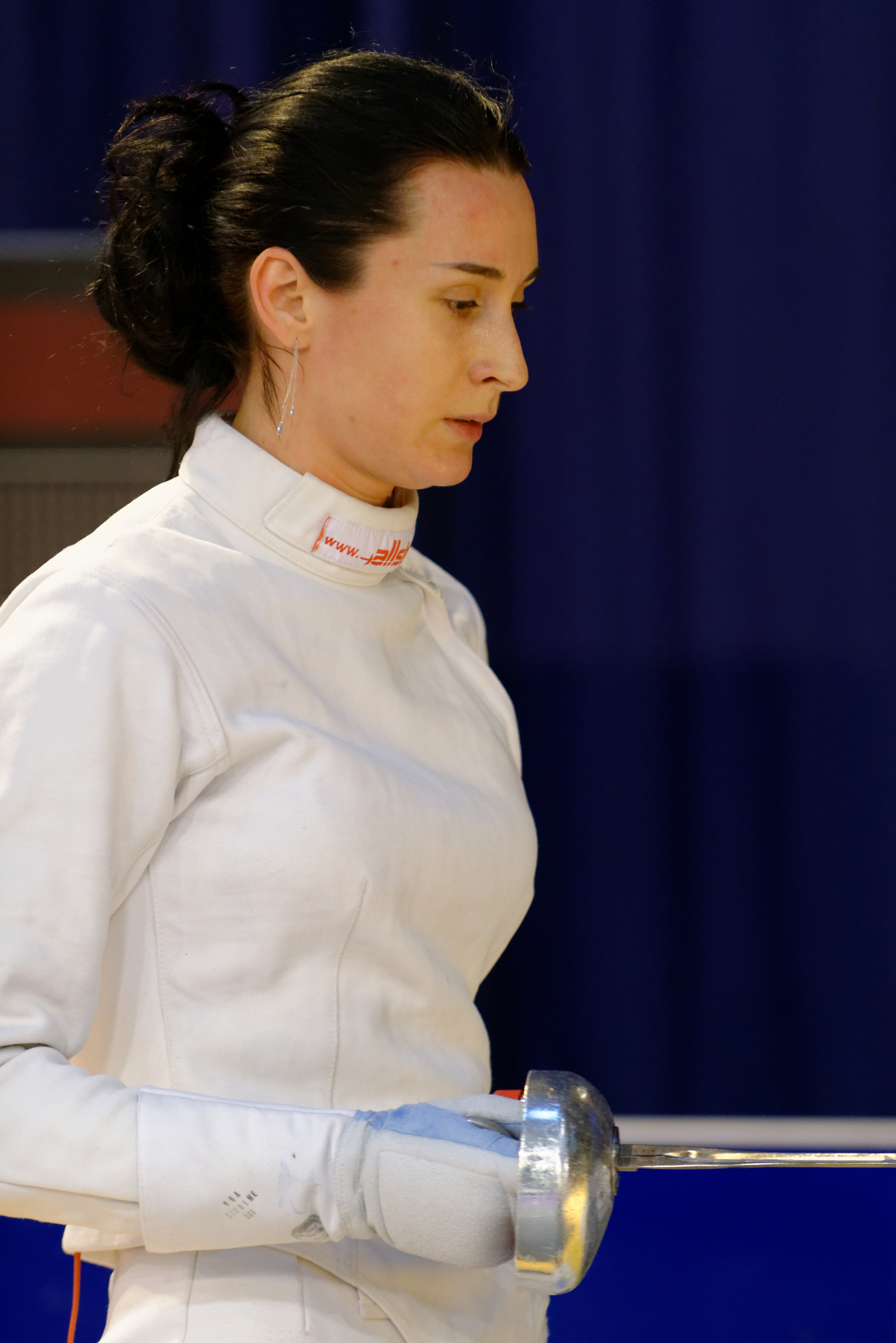
Lyubov Shutova (born 1983)

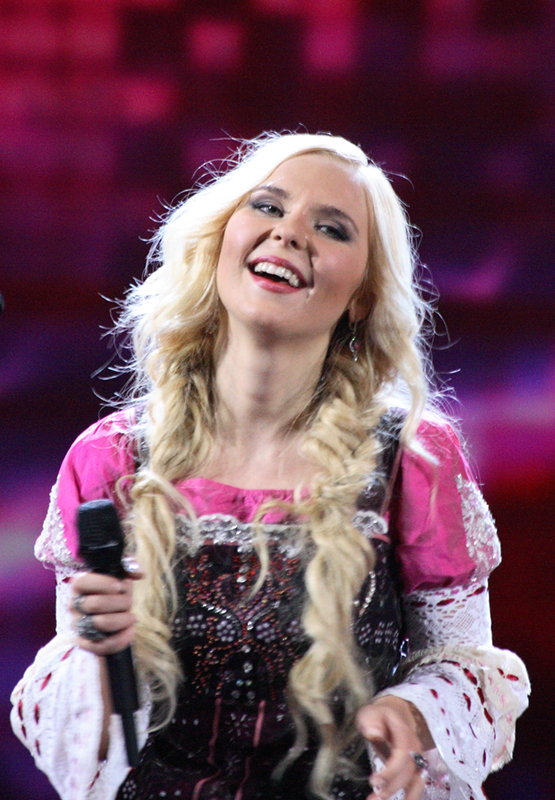
Pelageya (born 1986)

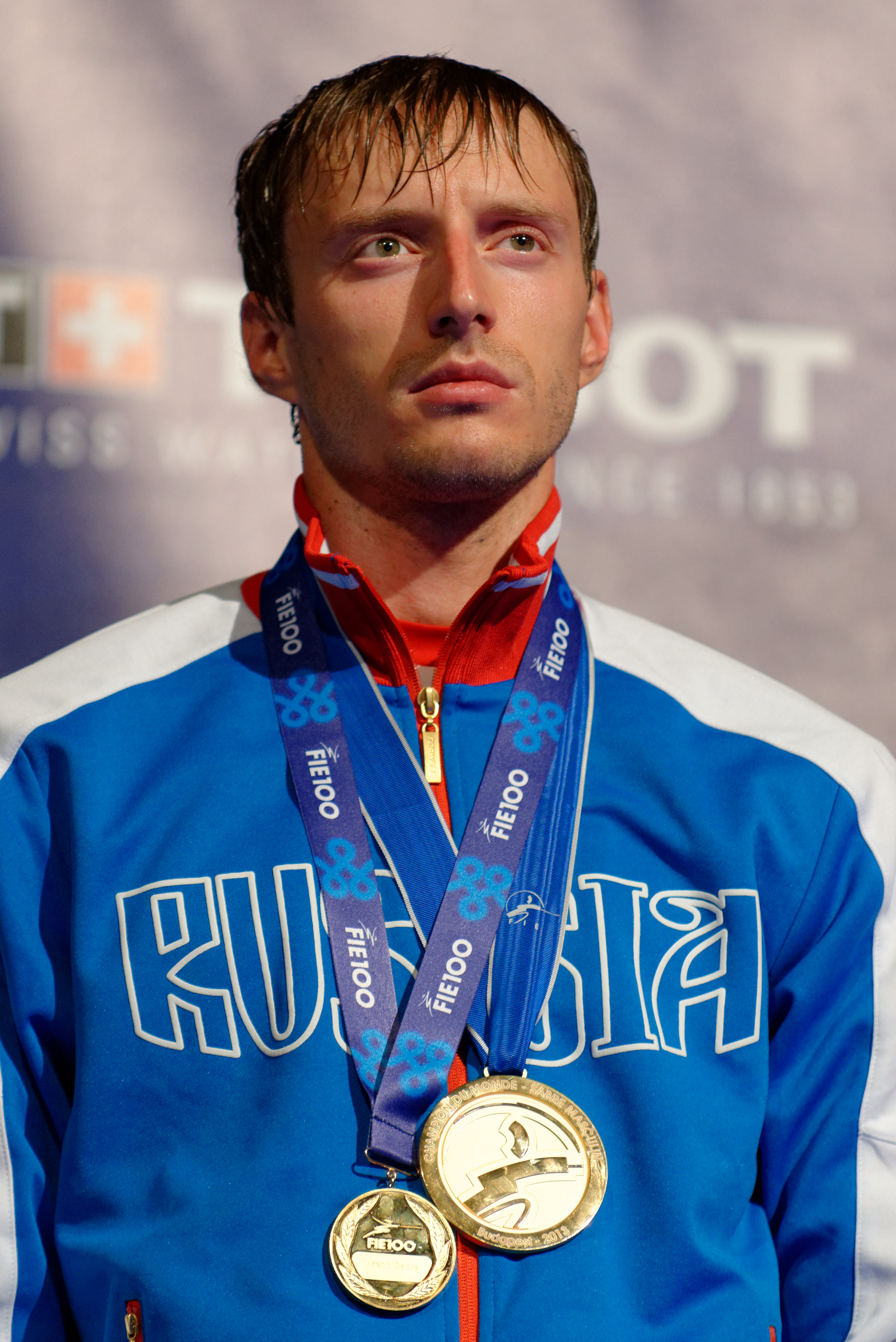
Veniamin Reshetnikov (born 1986)

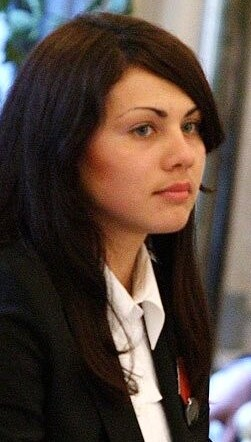
Yekaterina Ilyukhina (born 1987)

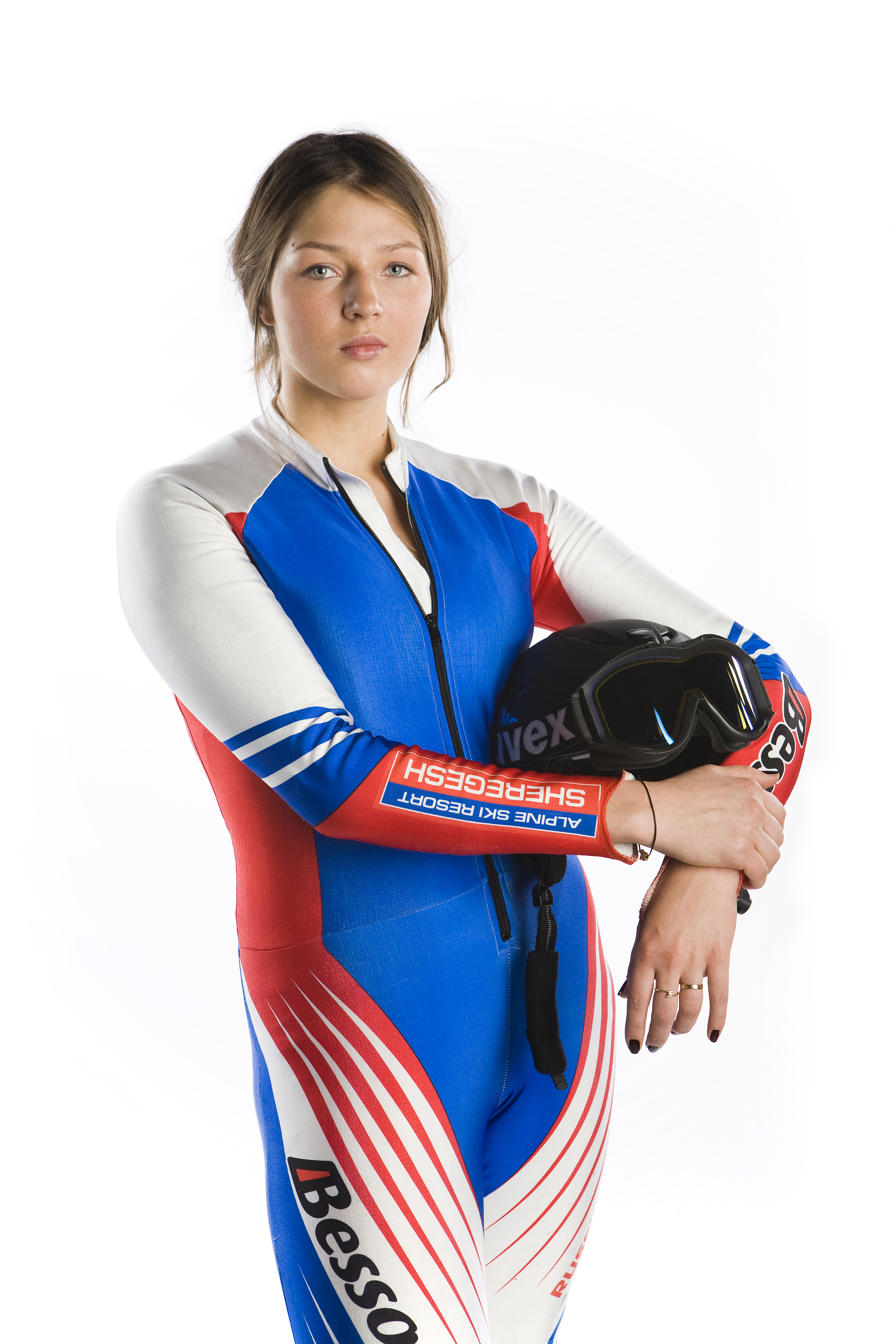
Alena Zavarzina (born 1989)

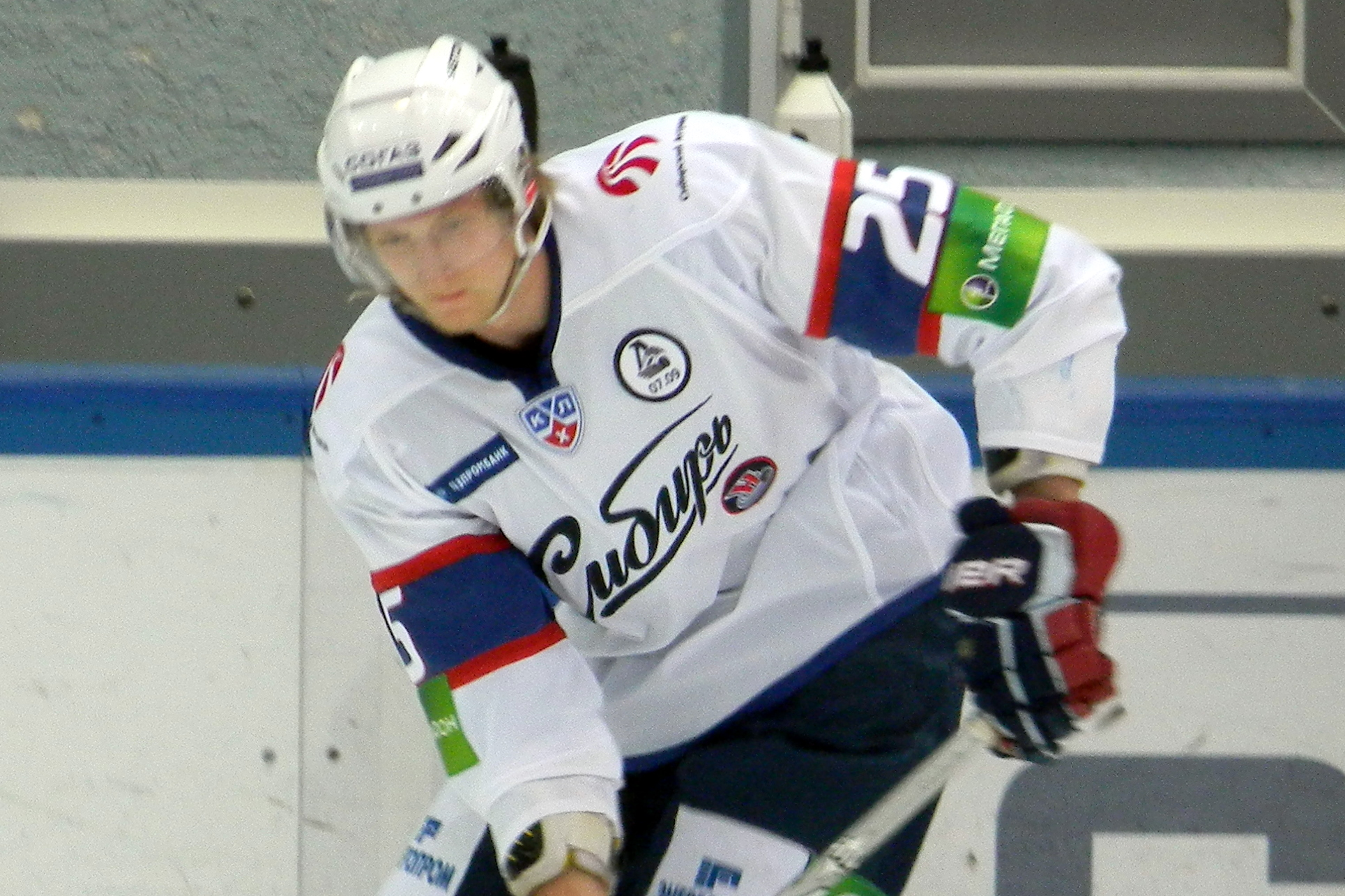
Maxim Ignatovich (born 1991)

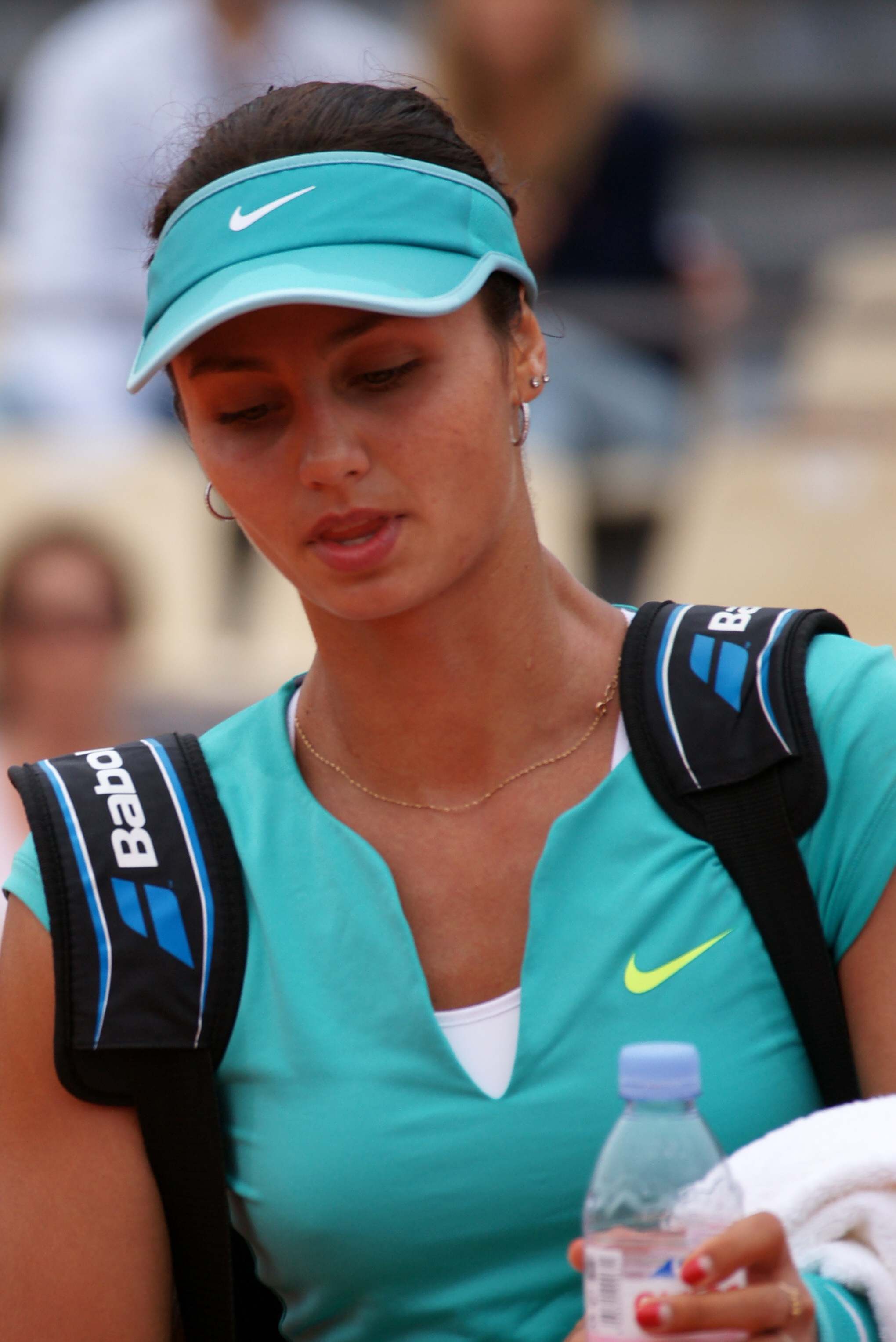
Elizaveta Kulichkova (born 1996)

== Born in Novosibirsk ==
=== 1901–1930 ===
- Arseny Sokolov (1910–1986), theoretical physicist
- Alexander Pokryshkin (1913–1985), Soviet flying ace and a Marshal of the Soviet Air Force; Hero of the Soviet Union
- Veniamin Nechayev (1915-1987), Soviet musician (guitarist) and film actor, the member of the estrada duet of Nechayev & Rudakov, which was popular in the 1950s, Merited Artist of the Russian Soviet Federative Socialist Republic (1961)
- Vsevolod Blinkov (1918–1987), football player and a bandy player
- Nikolai Kopilov (1919–1995), chess player
- Oleg Tolmachev (1919–2008), Soviet ice hockey player and coach
- Yevgeny Andreyev (1926–2000), colonel in the Soviet Air Force
- Valentin Kuzin (1926–1994), ice hockey player
- Vladimir Yakubovich (1926–2012), control theorist
- Aleksandr Zatsepin (born 1926), composer
- Arkady Vaksberg (1927–2011), lawyer, writer, film maker and playwright

=== 1931–1950 ===
- Eduard Artemyev (1937–2022), composer of electronic music and film scores
- Yury Karandin (born 1937), IIHF Hall of Fame inductee
- Yuriy Nazarov (born 1937), actor
- Gainan Saidkhuzhin (1937–2015), Russian Tatar cyclist and ten-time cycling champion of the Soviet Union
- Yury Yershov (born 1940), mathematician
- Yevgeny Kharitonov (1941–1981), writer, poet, playwright and theater director
- Thomas Sanderling (born 1942), German conductor
- Alexander Gavrilov (born 1943), pair skater
- Anatoly Koteshev (born 1944), fencer
- Yury Komarov (born 1945), businessman
- Valery Ilyinykh (1947–1982), gymnast
- Israel Shamir (born 1947), writer and journalist
- Vladimir Zubkov (born 1948), wrestler
- Vladimir Paznikov (1949–2008), Soviet international speedway rider

=== 1951–1960 ===
- Irina Alfyorova (born 1951), actress
- Vladimir Antyufeyev (born 1951), Soviet OMON police officer, Minister of State Security of Transnistria (1992–2011)
- Sergei Kourdakov (1951–1973), KGB agent and naval officer
- Alexander Akimov (1953–1986), shift supervisor of the night crew that worked at the Chernobyl Nuclear Power Plant Unit #4 on the night of the accident, on April 26, 1986
- Nina Sadur (1950–2023), playwright and prose writer
- Viktor Tolokonsky (born 1953), politician
- Tatyana Zolotnitskaya (born 1955), freestyle swimmer
- Anatoly Lokot (born 1959), mayor of Novosibirsk
- Irina Strakhova (born 1959), race walker
- Marina Gershenovich (born 1960), poet and translator

=== 1961–1970 ===
- Andrey Perlov (born 1961), race walker
- Olga Voshchakina (born 1961), fencer
- Aleksei Maklakov (born 1962), actor and singer
- Andrei Panin (1962–2013), actor and director
- Oleg Postnov (born 1962), author, university professor, philologist and a literary critic
- Oleg Sudakov (born 1962), musician, poet, artist and publicist
- Liliya Vasilchenko (1962–2011), cross-country skier
- Natalia Fileva (1963–2019), aviation executive and millionaire
- Irina Laricheva (born 1963), swimmer
- Alexander Goldin (born 1964), chess grandmaster
- Vadim Kuzmin (1964–2012), musician
- Alena Ledeneva (born 1964), Professor of Politics and Society at the School of Slavonic and East European Studies, University College London
- Dmitry Selivanov (1964–1989), rock singer
- Vladimir Strelchenko (born 1964), mayor of Khimki
- Andrey Zvyagintsev (born 1964), film director and actor
- Aleksander Barkov (born 1965), professional ice hockey coach
- Grigory Kiriyenko (born 1965), fencer
- Eugene Nalimov (born 1965), chess programmer
- John Rudenko (born 1966), Russian Orthodox Bishop of Urzhum and Omutninsk, and radiophysicist
- Sergey Surovikin (born 1966), Commander of the Russian Aerospace Forces
- Yanka Dyagileva (1966–1991), poet and singer-songwriter
- Aleksandr Karelin (born 1967), Greco-Roman wrestler and a Hero of the Russian Federation
- Ivan Kulakov (born 1967), geophysicist and artist
- Igor Polyansky (born 1967), backstroke swimmer
- Roman Stolyar (born 1967), composer, piano improviser and educator
- Vyacheslav Shalygin (born 1968), science fiction writer
- Andrei Tarasenko (born 1968), ice hockey player
- Evgeni Kisurin (born 1969), basketball player

=== 1971–1975 ===
- Vladislav Bobrik (born 1971), road bicycle racer
- Larisa Merk (born 1971), rower
- Vadim Repin (born 1971), Belgian-Russian violinist
- Dmitry Shorin (born 1971), artist and sculptor
- Dmitry Zatonsky (born 1971), ice hockey forward
- Olga Nikolaeva (born 1972), volleyball player
- Ruben Aganbegyan (born 1972), economist
- Anton Mordasov (born 1972), pianist
- Tatiana Malinina (born 1973), figure skater
- Tatiana Moskvina (born 1973), Russian-born Belarusian judoka
- Stanislav Pozdnyakov (born 1973), fencer and president of the Russian Olympic Commission
- Sergey Tatevosyan (born 1973), professional boxer
- Mitya Fomin (born 1974), singer, dancer and producer
- Sergei Klimovich (born 1974), professional ice hockey center
- Maxim Vengerov (born 1974), Israeli violinist, violist and conductor
- Alexander Medvedev (born 1975), Russian singer known by his stage name Shura
- Evgeny Shaldybin (born 1975), professional ice hockey player
- Sergei Zhukov (born 1975), professional ice hockey player

=== 1976–1980 ===
- Anton Chermashentsev (born 1976), Olympic rower
- Yan Golubovsky (born 1976), professional ice hockey player
- Vladimir Komarov (born 1976), musician, singer, songwriter, sound producer, DJ and journalist
- Alexander Ustinov (born 1976), Belarusian professional boxer, kickboxer and mixed martial artist
- Konstantin Gorovikov (born 1977), ice hockey forward
- Denis Laktionov (born 1977), football player
- Dmitri Nabokov (born 1977), professional ice hockey forward
- Yevgeni Podgorny (born 1977), Olympic gymnast
- Ekaterina Vinogradova (born 1977), biathlete and cross-country skier
- Denis Inkin (born 1978), professional boxer
- Anna Tsygankova (born 1979), ballet dancer
- Tatiana Burina (born 1980), ice hockey forward
- Irina Dzyuba (born 1980), Russian rhythmic gymnast
- Aleksandr Nikolaenko (born 1980), badminton player

=== 1981–1985 ===
- Maria Guerassimenko (born 1981), pair skater
- Jenya (born 1981), voice actress
- Dmitry Bocharov (born 1982), chess grandmaster
- Vladimir Gusev (born 1982), professional ice hockey defenceman
- Artyom Kryukov (born 1982), professional ice hockey forward
- Lyubov Shutova (born 1983), fencer, world champion in 2009 and team world champion in 2013 and 2014
- Olesya Syreva (born 1983), middle/long-distance runner
- Anna Kikina (born 1984), engineer and test cosmonaut
- Anton Tokarev (born 1984), pair skater
- Pavel Podkolzin (born 1985), professional basketball player
- Konstantin Shamray (born 1985), pianist
- Irina Ufimtseva (born 1985), Olympics freestyle swimmer

=== 1986–1990 ===
- Konstantin Alexeyev (born 1988), professional ice hockey defenceman
- Valentina Artemyeva (born 1986), breaststroke swimmer
- Ilia Chernousov (born 1986), cross-country skier
- Grigori Chirkin (born 1986), professional footballer
- Youlia Fedossova (born 1988), French female tennis player
- Igor Gorokhov (born 1990), ice hockey defenceman
- Maxim Gratchev (born 1988), ice hockey player
- Yuliya Gavrilova (born 1989), sabre fencer
- Yekaterina Ilyukhina (born 1987), snowboarder
- Maksim Ishkeldin (1990–2021), bandy player
- Max Jenkins (born 1986), American professional racing cyclist
- Dmitriy Koshkin (born 1986), alpine skier
- Yuri Larionov (born 1986), pair skater
- Artyom Loskutov (born 1986), performance artist and an activist
- Aleksandr Makarenko (born 1986), professional footballer
- Vladimir Markelov (born 1987), professional ice hockey forward
- Egor Milovzorov (born 1987), professional ice hockey forward
- Pelageya (born 1986), singer
- Veniamin Reshetnikov (born 1986), sabre fencer, European champion in 2009, world champion in 2013, three-time team world champion (2010, 2011 and 2013) and three-time team European champion (2007, 2009 and 2012)
- Vladimir Rykov (born 1987), professional football player
- Vitaliy Sidorov (born 1990), professional football player
- Daniil Simkin (born 1987), ballet dancer and principal dancer with American Ballet Theatre
- Mikhail Simonyan (born 1986), violinist
- Michail Tsarev (born 1986), mixed martial artist
- Roman Vlasov (born 1990), Greco-Roman wrestler
- Irina Zaryazhko (born 1989), volleyball player
- Alena Zavarzina (born 1989), snowboarder
- Georgi Zotov (born 1990), professional football player

=== 1991–2000 ===
- Alexei Antsiferov (born 1991), professional ice hockey forward
- Yevgeni Gapon (born 1991), professional footballer
- Maxim Ignatovich (born 1991), professional ice hockey player
- Alexey Sobolev (born 1991), snowboarder
- Nikita Ignatyev (born 1992), artistic gymnast
- Vladimir Morozov (born 1992), swimmer
- Roman Tatalin (born 1992), professional ice hockey defenceman
- Denis Bachurin (born 1993), professional ice hockey defenceman
- Yegor Korshkov (born 1996), ice hockey player
- Elizaveta Kulichkova (born 1996), tennis player
- Ivan Stretovich (born 1996), artistic gymnast
- Grigori Denisenko (born 2000), ice hockey player

== Lived in Novosibirsk ==
- Mikhail Lavrentyev (1900–1980), mathematician and hydrodynamicist; professor at Novosibirsk State University (1959–1966)
- Ilia Vekua (1907–1977), Soviet-Georgian mathematician; first rector of Novosibirsk State University (1959–1964)
- Alexey Okladnikov (1908–1981), archaeologist, historian and ethnographer; Professor and Head, Department of History, of Novosibirsk State University (1962–1981)
- Aleksandr Aleksandrov (1912–1999), mathematician, physicist, philosopher and mountaineer; lived from 1964 to 1986 in Novosibirsk, heading the Laboratory of Geometry of the Institute of Mathematics of the Siberian Division of the USSR Academy of Sciences, teaching at Novosibirsk State University
- Samson Kutateladze (1914-1986), physicist; professor at Novosibirsk State University
- Dmitry Belyayev (1917–1985), geneticist and academician; his decades-long effort to breed domesticated foxes was described by The New York Times as “arguably the most extraordinary breeding experiment ever conducted”
- Gersh Budker (1918–1977), physicist; became one of the founders of Faculty of Physics of Novosibirsk State University in 1961
- Yegor Ligachyov (1920–2021), politician; First Secretary of the Novosibirsk Komsomol, before becoming Deputy Chairman of the Novosibirsk Soviet, and then Secretary of the Novosibirsk Obkom between 1959 and 1961
- Valentin Koptyug (1931–1997), scientist; chancellor of Novosibirsk State University (1978–1980)
- Rostislav Shilo (1940-2016), director of the Novosibirsk Zoo (1969-2016), honorary citizen of Novosibirsk
- Semën Kutateladze (1945–2025), mathematician; professor at Novosibirsk State University
- Anatoly Kvashnin (1946-2022), Hero of the Russian Federation (1999), military and civilian official, the Chief of the General Staff of Russian Armed Forces (1997-2004), Army general (1997), the Plenipotentiary Representative of the President of Russia in the Siberian Federal District (2004-2010), 1st class Active State Councillor of the Russian Federation (2004)
- Yevgeniya Ivanovna 'Jenya' Davidyuk (1981) Russian Seiyū
- Vladimir Gorodetsky (born 1948), mayor of Novosibirsk (2000–2014); Governor of Novosibirsk Oblast (2014-2017); senator of Russian Federation Council since 2018
- Zinaida Amosova (born 1950), cross-country skier, training at the Armed Forces sports society in Novosibirsk
- Joseph Werth (born 1952), Bishop of Transfiguration in Novosibirsk
- Tatyana Snezhina (1972-1995), poet and singer-songwriter
- Aleksandr Butko (born 1986), setter, plays for Lokomotiv Novosibirsk; also in the Russian Olympic men's volleyball team
- Vladimir Tarasenko (born 1991), professional ice hockey right winger, played in the system of Sibir Novosibirsk organization
