= Kulakov =

Kulakov (masculine, Russian: Кулаков) or Kulakova (feminine, Russian: Кулаковa) is a Russian surname. Notable people with the surname include:

- Alexander Kulakov (born 1983), Belarusian ice hockey player
- Denys Kulakov (born 1986), Ukrainian footballer
- Fyodor Kulakov (1918–1978), Soviet Politburo member
- Galina Kulakova (born 1942), Russian Soviet cross-country skier
- Ivan Kulakov (born 1967), Russian geophysicist
- Mikhail P. Kulakov (1927–2010), Russian religious freedom advocate, biblical translator.
- Natalya Kulakova (born 1985), Kazakhstani handball player
- Nikolai Kulakov (1908–1976), Soviet naval officer
- Taras Kulakov (born 1987), Russian-American youtuber
- Vladimir Kulakov (born 1944), 3rd Governor of Voronezh Oblast

== See also ==
- Russian destroyer Vice-Admiral Kulakov, a Soviet ship
