= Shalygin =

Shalygin (Russian: Шалыгин, Ukrainian: Шалигін, female form: Shalygina) is a surname of Russian origin. Notable people with the surname include:

- Maxim Shalygin (born 1985), Ukrainian-Dutch composer, conductor, and performer
- Vyacheslav Shalygin (born 1968), Russian science fiction writer
- Yelena Shalygina (born 1986), Kazakh wrestler
