= Pelagia and the Red Rooster =

2003 novel by Boris Akunin

- Author: Boris Akunin
- Original title: Пелагия и красный петух
- Translator: Andrew Bromfield
- Language: Russian
- Genre: Historical detective, Magical realism
- Publisher: AST (Russia); Weidenfeld & Nicolson (UK); Random House (US)
- Publication date: 2003
- Publication place: Russia
- Media type: Print (hardback & paperback)
- Preceded by: Pelagia and the Black Monk

Pelagia and the Red Rooster (published in US as Sister Pelagia and the Red Cockerel) is a 2003 novel by the Russian writer Boris Akunin. It's the third novel in the Sister Pelagia series, preceded by Pelagia and the White Bulldog (2001) and Pelagia and the Black Monk (2001).

== Plot summary ==
The novel opens with the murder of Emmanuel (also known as Manuila), the enigmatic leader of a religious sect known as the Foundlings, onboard a steamship. Pelagia soon finds out that the murder victim was actually an impostor, and the real Emmanuel is still alive.

She follows his trail from Russia to the Holy Land to warn him about the mysterious assassins, and finds out plenty of strange details about him. It turns out that Emmanuel is an eccentric wandering prophet with peculiar speech mannerisms (a lisp and a habit of putting in bookish words "at appropriate and inappropriate points"), but also mind-reading powers that border on supernatural and an uncanny ability to bring out the best nature in everyone with just a few words.

Eventually Pelagia catches up with Emmanuel in the Gethsemane garden, and he claims to be Jesus Christ who ended up in the nineteenth century after passing through a mystical cave. He desires to return to his epoch, and eventually he presumably manages to do it by entering the cave with a red rooster. Pelagia decides to follow him and also disappears.

== Reception ==
Mary Fitzgerald, writing for The Guardian, described the novel as "a lively, engaging thriller whose subject matter allows Akunin, a Russian scholar, to ask provocative questions about faith". Melissa McClements of Financial Times wrote: "Despite some of the gruesome content, there’s a certain quaint cosiness to Pelagia’s tales, emanating from her bespectacled, clumsy, constantly knitting presence". Brandon Robshaw of The Independent said that "like all the best detective novels, Pelagia and the Red Rooster is both relaxing and stimulating at the same time". Kirkus Reviews said: "The final revelation is nothing short of epochal. That revelation is so long in coming, though, that newcomers overwhelmed by the rich feast Akunin spreads here may want to begin with the more modest fare offered in earlier volumes". Patricia Cohen of The New York Times described the novel as "absorbing" and stated that "Mr. Akunin adeptly weaves philosophical musings and suspense".
