= The Yellow Arrow =

1993 novella by Viktor Pelevin

- Author: Victor Pelevin
- Language: Russian
- Publication date: 1993
- Publication place: Russia
- Media type: Print (Paperback)
- Pages: 92 pp
- ISBN: 0811213242

The Yellow Arrow (Russian: «Жёлтая стрела ») is an allegorical novella by Victor Pelevin written in 1993. It was published in different collections of works of the author.

== Plot ==
The hero of the story is Andrei, a passenger on the nonstop express train, tormented by the question of the meaning of traffic. The impetus to the awakening of his consciousness is a meeting with a man named Khan, who showed him the secret inscriptions in the secluded areas of the train. An attempt to find a new point of observation (the so-called "ritual death" - an exit to the roof of the train) does not reveal the truth he is seeking: there are only a few loners with the faces of sleepwalkers continuing their aimless movement on top of the same express train. But one day Andrei and Han see a "strange man with a straw hat over his shoulders," pushing off the roof, jumping over the bridge railing while the train is moving, landing in the river and floating to the shore. The path is indicated, there is a way out of the ordinary space, and the main character Andrei commits an act: he leaves the carriage, chooses the freedom of the world, unfamiliar, disturbing, and the glittering yellow windows of the train flies past to the destroyed bridge.

== Release ==
The Yellow Arrow was first published in Russia in the magazine Novy Mir. Since its initial release it has been republished in several collections of Pelevin's work. In 1996 New Directions published the work in English, translated by Andrew Bromfield.

== Themes ==
The novella contains various themes and allegories. Richard Dyer of The Boston Globe likened the railway and train to life in the Soviet Union. Sophie Pinkham of The Guardian shared this interpretation, also noting that "a Buddhist interpretation is equally apt. Pelevin was telling his readers that those in search of freedom must find a way to exit the moving vehicle – if not through death, then perhaps via meditative transcendence, or literature itself."

== Reception ==
Critical reception for The Yellow Arrow has been favorable.

== See also ==
- Le Transperceneige
- Snowpiercer
- Chapayev and Void
