= Metro 2034 =

2009 novel by Dmitry Glukhovsky

- Original Russian edition cover
- Author: Dmitry Glukhovsky
- Language: Russian
- Series: Metro
- Genre: Post-apocalyptic
- Publisher: AST
- Publication date: Paperback; 16 March 2009 (Russia); 13 November 2014 (United Kingdom); E-book; 20 February 2014 (United States & United Kingdom)
- Publication place: Russia
- Media type: Print (hardcover and paperback); E-book; Audiobook
- Pages: 448 (Russian edition); 320 (English edition)
- Preceded by: Metro 2033
- Followed by: Metro 2035

Metro 2034 (Russian: Метро 2034) is a 2009 post-apocalyptic science fiction novel in the Metro series, written by Russian author Dmitry Glukhovsky as a sequel to his earlier Metro 2033. It later received its own sequel with the release of Metro 2035.

== Plot ==
In the south of the Metro, Sevastopolskaya Station relies on regular supplies of ammunition and other goods from the central stations to survive. Without explanation, communication is lost and stocks begin to run low. Several scouting parties leave to investigate, but do not return.

Hunter, who disappeared during the events of Metro 2033 and is now heavily traumatised, has been working as a border guard at Sevastopolskaya. He volunteers to lead one last attempt to re-establish contact with the central Metro stations before the station mobilises its military and heads north en masse. He is accompanied by Homer, an old man searching for inspiration for a book. Hunter makes contact with the guards at Tulskaya Station, but after an argument the hermetic doors are sealed. Hunter tells Homer that the station had been captured by bandits and must be destroyed, but Homer recovers a diary left by one of the previous expeditions which indicates that the station had been infected by a deadly disease.

They detour through the abandoned and heavily irradiated Kakhovskaya Line and encounter Sasha, the teenage daughter of the exiled Avtozavodskaya Station Master, who had recently died. She accompanies them and the increasingly violent Hunter kills several men as they pass through Avtozavodskaya. Sasha restrains him somewhat, preventing additional bloodshed and during a mutant attack at Paveletskaya Station, Hunter is seriously injured after saving Sasha. Sasha believes that she can prevent Hunter from committing further atrocities in his mission to protect Sevastopolskaya, but after an argument Hunter presses on without them. Homer and Sasha are joined by Leonid, a musician and are re-united with Hunter at Dobryninskaya Station.

An increasingly unstable Hunter heads to the centre of the Metro, to Polis, to gather an armed force to cleanse the infected stations. He is accompanied by Homer, while Sasha leaves with Leonid who claims to know a cure for the plague. The detour was unnecessary and Leonid admits that he did it in order to spend some time with Sasha. He tells her the disease had broken out before in a different section of the Metro and it was found that exposure to radiation could cure it. He agrees to accompany her in an effort to prevent Hunter from killing everyone there.

Hunter finds his old comrade Miller (referred to as 'Melnik' in Metro 2033), the leader of "The Order" – a paramilitary group dedicated to defending the Metro and who believed Hunter was dead. Miller provides him with a heavily armed squad and Hunter returns to Dobryninskaya, while Homer wrestles with his conscience as to whether to attempt to stop him or allow the massacre to proceed. The Order arrives at Tulskaya and prepares to fire at the infected, only to be distracted by Leonid's music. Sasha appeals to Hunter, and tells him of the possible cure. The troops already stationed within Tulskaya, who had been trying to contain the outbreak, detonate explosives that flood the station. The Order withdraws and seals the hermetic doors, leaving those inside to drown.

Several weeks later, both Hunter and Homer are back at the border guard at Sevastopolskaya. Homer had searched for Sasha's body, but was unable to find it, leaving her fate unknown.

== English editions ==
The novel was released by Victor Gollancz as an e-book and hardback in English, translated by Andrew Bromfield, on 20 February 2014. The paperback edition was published by Gollancz and Orion Publishing Group in United Kingdom on 13 November 2014.

== Reception ==
The novel was well received by critics and audiences alike. The book was widely popular in Russia where it has sold some 300,000 copies in just six months, making it Russia's biggest local bestseller in 2009. The book has also been published online for free on the Metro 2034 official website, where over a million visitors have read the text.

== Art project ==
Glukhovsky has turned a book into an art-project, inviting Russian electronic performer and hip-hop star Dolphin to write an original soundtrack for the novel, while artist Anton Gretchko worked on the oil-painted images gallery.
