= The Tambourine of the Lower World =

1993 short story by Victor Pelevin

- Author: Victor Pelevin
- Language: Russian
- Genre: Short story
- Publication date: 1993
- Publication place: Russia
- Media type: Print (Paperback)
- ISBN: 5-300-00508-8

The Tambourine of the Lower World (Russian: «Бубен Нижнего мира») is a short story by Victor Pelevin, published in 1993. The story gave its name to the first volume of the collected works of Victor Pelevin, published in 1996.

== Plot ==
The story is an experience of creating a "mental death laser," the reading of which is supposed to be followed by the reader's self-destruction.

At the beginning of the story, the author suggests remembering the combination "The Tambourine of the Upper World," because it is curious and will definitely be told about it, but only later.

Then he starts talking about Brezhnev, rays, energy, scolding himself for his habit of talking about everything at once, but when he gets to the subject of death, he begins the story of creating a death laser, which will be a collection of certain word-commands that will appeal to the human unconscious and evoke a series of associations. These word-commands would be based on emotional thoughts of death.

This machine (mental laser) he proposes to call - The Tambourine of the Lower World.

In the story, "The Tambourine of the Underworld," he shows how a set of ideas and verbal signals can destroy human consciousness and then construct it anew, in the configuration someone wants.

The author writes: "Maybe today, already now, he has written this fateful sequence of letters, and now no one and nothing can protect us from him.

The postmodernist goal of creating such an "intellectual virus" is the destruction of the "old society" and outdated ideology, the demythologization of Soviet and post-Soviet society. The next part of this project is to create a new picture of reality (consciousness).

Such linguistic technologies are based on the aesthetic transfer of the intentions of the writer-projector into the sphere of the "brain structures" of the character and, consequently, the reader, which also requires adequate literary methods of decoding.

And such methods have already been partly tested. These are primarily literary psychoanalysis. He believes that the deep structure of the text is in some way functionally similar to the unconscious, which makes it possible to correlate philological analysis with psychoanalysis: "...it is the comparison of the basic categories of psychoanalysis and generative grammar that suggests rather deep parallels between the technique of consciousness analysis developed by Freud and the technique of philological text analysis in the broadest sense.

Structurally, the story consists of fragments of thoughts and phrases, which at first glance the reader is completely unconnected, but at the end it turns out that the "mental laser of death" invented by the author (which consists of a certain sequence of chaotic thoughts and phrases) has been triggered.

Perhaps the story is a mockery of neuro-linguistic programming techniques.

== See also ==
- The Tambourine of the Upper World
