= Taras Kulakov =

Ukrainian-American YouTuber

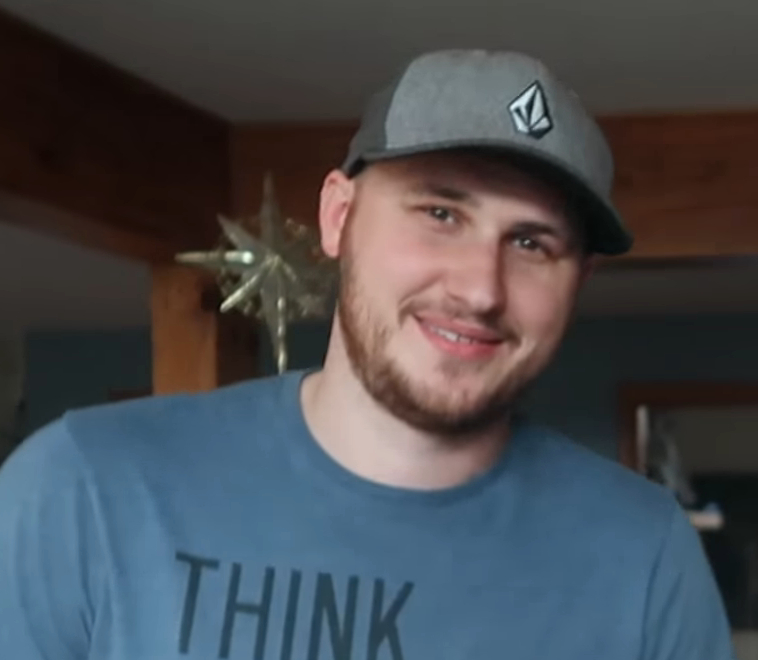
- Kulakov in 2017
- Born: March 11, 1987 (age 39); Ukrainian SSR, Soviet Union
- Spouse: Katherine Kulakova (m. 2018)
- Children: 3

YouTube information
- Channel: CrazyRussianHacker
- Years active: 2009–present
- Genres: Gadget reviews; life hacks; unboxing; scientific demonstrations
- Subscribers: 12 million
- Views: 3.79 billion
- Last updated: March 20, 2026

Taras Vladimirovich Kulakov (Note: Russian: Тарас Владимирович Кулакoв, romanized: Taras Vladimirovich Kulakov; Ukrainian: Тарас Володимирович Кулаков, romanized: Taras Volodymyrovych Kulakov) (born March 11, 1987), better known as CrazyRussianHacker, is a Ukrainian-born Russian-American YouTuber of mixed Russian and Ukrainian descent.

He became known for his content on life hacks, technology, and scientific demonstrations, popularized with the catchphrase "Safety is [the] number one priority" at the beginning of most of his videos.

Kulakov's presence on YouTube is split between three channels, as of June 2023: "CrazyRussianHacker," created in 2012, has over three billion views and 11.8 million subscribers, and is one of the platform's top 500 channels; "Taras Kul," created in 2009, has over 3.6 million subscribers; "Kul Farm," created in 2014, has 353,000 subscribers.

== Early and personal life ==
Kulakov was born in the Soviet Union on March 11, 1987, into a mixed Russian and Ukrainian family. In 2006, Kulakov moved to Asheville, North Carolina, with his family. He worked at Walmart until 2012, while developing his early YouTube channels.

In a Q&A video, he clarified that the last place he lived in before moving to the United States was the city of Donetsk in Ukraine. As he grew up speaking Russian and not knowing much Ukrainian, he considers himself Russian.

He has two brothers and three sisters as stated in his September 2016 Q&A video. He also claims to have a half-brother and a half-sister.
