= Hermit and Six-Toes =

Book by Viktor Pelevin

Hermit and Six Toes
- Author: Victor Pelevin
- Language: Russian
- Genre: Novella
- Publication date: 1990
- Publication place: Russia
- Media type: Print (Paperback)
- ISBN: 5-85950-013-0

Hermit and Six Toes (Russian: «Затворник и Шестипалый») is a novella by Victor Pelevin, published in 1990 in Russia and translated by Andrew Bromfield in 1996.

== Plot ==
The story's main characters are two broiler chickens, Hermit and Six-Toes, raised for slaughter at the Lunacharsky poultry plant. The narrative reveals that the chicken community has a complex hierarchical structure, with positions determined by proximity to the feeding trough.

The plot of the story begins with Six-Toes's exile from society. Having been expelled from society and the trough, Six-Toes encounters Hermit, a chick philosopher and naturalist, wandering between different societies within the combine. Thanks to his remarkable intellect, he independently managed to master the language of the "gods" (i.e. Russian), learned to read the time by clock and understood that chickens hatch from eggs, although he did not see it himself.

Six-Toes becomes a disciple and associate of Hermit. Together they travel from world to world, accumulating and summarizing knowledge and experience. Hermit's highest goal is to comprehend a certain mysterious phenomenon called "flight". Hermit believes: having mastered flight, he will be able to escape beyond the universe of the combine. It is the achievements of gifted loners, contrasted in the literal sense of dense collectivism, leads to an optimistic end.

In the story, the author is very careful to point out that there are two reasons for becoming hermits: either one must be a Hermit, that is, a solitary thinker, or one must be a Six-Fingered Man, that is, a philistine who is no different but has six fingers, so society rejects such (society in the story is all the other chickens).

The author's metaphor for religion can be noted in the story. Hermit realized that if the chickens want to survive and come in for a second round in the hatchery, they don't need to eat. They would then be too dry and pale, and they would be sent out to eat again. And he preaches ascesis, preaches renunciation of earthly goods. As a result, everyone fasts and everyone is sent on another round of fattening. There's also a wonderful metaphor, by the way, where the two characters are thrown out of society, thrown out of the incubator and thereby saved. "Society," Hermit explains, "is a device for overcoming the wall of the world."

Critics have noted Pelevin's parody of all religious philosophy. "Where do we come from?" - Six-Toes asks. "You know, only at very deep levels of memory does that question get answered," answers the Hermit. - "It seems to me that we emerge from white orbs." "And where do the white orbs come from?" - Six-Toes asks. "Good for you," says Hermit, "it took me much longer to ask that question. I suspect that these white orbs are emerging from us."

The hero of the story needed first to get out of "society" and get rid of the oppression of dogma in order to understand the illusory nature of the prevailing system, its unlivability. The world of the henhouse is divided into two camps: "society" and the outcasts. Society lives without thinking about life, guided by rules and norms, but as soon as one leaves it and becomes an outcast, the ability to look at life from the outside and think about it begins to emerge. Few, like the Hermit, leave society voluntarily, for the system is organized and everything in it is subordinated to a single idea.

The story bears a resemblance to George Orwell's "Animal Farm". Six-Toes's expulsion from society leads him eventually to the realization that all of the inhabitants here are doomed to death and ultimately to salvation. The circle of samsara is clearly embodied in the work: containers move on a closed conveyor belt, where chickens are fattened after hatching, then slaughtered on their way to shop number one, after which the cycle repeats itself.
