= John Rudenko =

John is a bishop of Urzhum and Omutninsk of the Russian Orthodox Church

- Bishop of Urzhum and Omutninsk
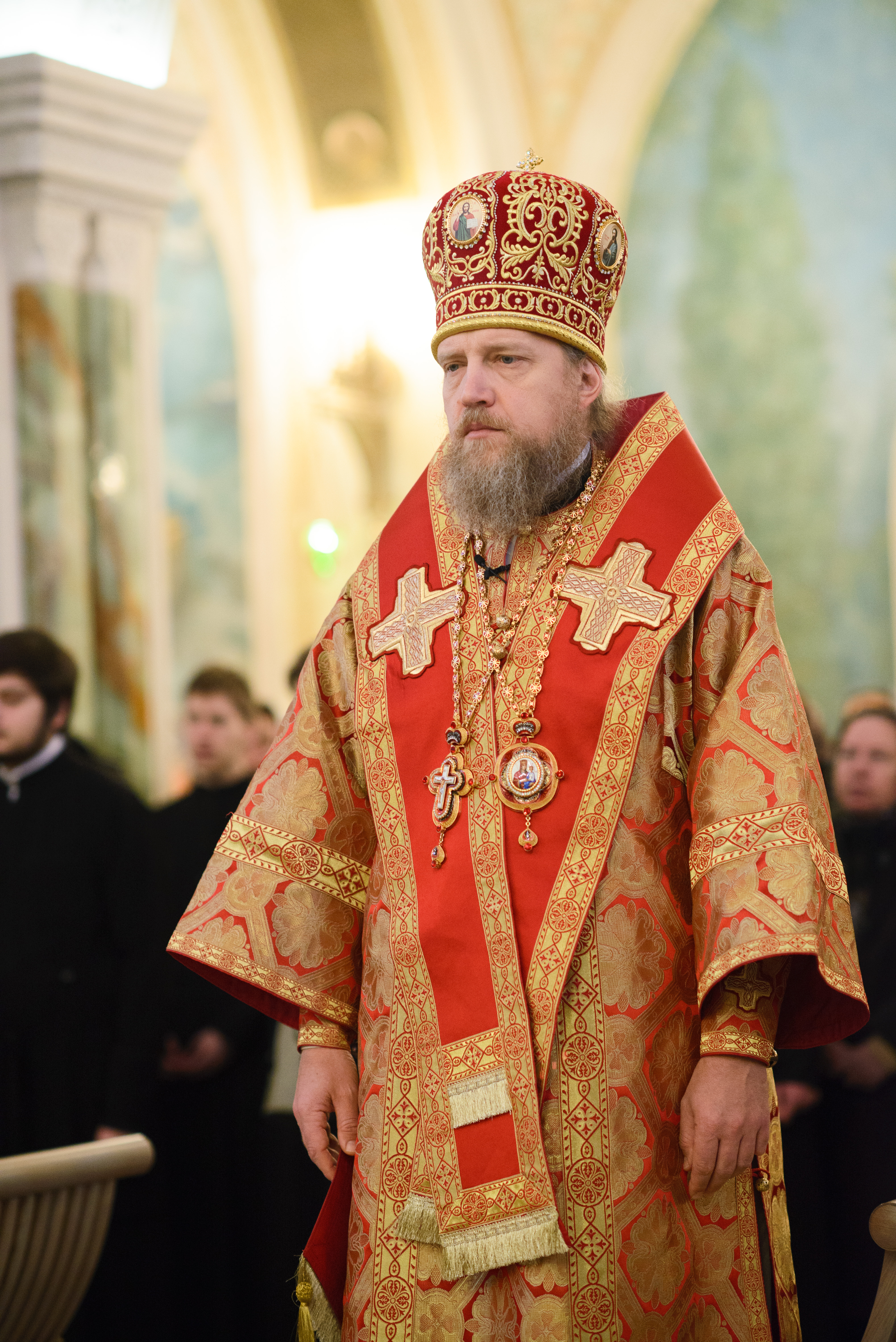
- Church: Russian Orthodox Church

Personal details
- Born: Vladimir Nikolayevich Rudenko; 8 November 1966 (age 59) Novosibirsk, Soviet Union
- Denomination: Eastern Orthodox Church

John (secular name Vladimir Nikolayevich Rudenko) (born 1966) is a bishop of Urzhum and Omutninsk of the Russian Orthodox Church. He is also a radiophysicist, candidate of physical and mathematical sciences (1994) and lecturer at Novosibirsk State Technical University (1990s).

== Biography ==
=== Secular education and scientific activity ===
Vladimir Rudenko was born on 8 November 1966 in Novosibirsk. In 1988 he graduated from Novosibirsk Electrotechnical Institute (future NSTU). After graduating from the institute, he worked in a research laboratory and was a postgraduate student (correspondence form). In 1994 he defended his dissertation for the degree of candidate of physical and mathematical sciences on the topic Radiophysics, including quantum radiophysics (Радиофизика, включая квантовую радиофизику). Until March 1998, he worked as a lecturer at the Department of Applied and Theoretical Physics and Department of Antenna Systems of the NSTU.

=== Religious career ===
On 20 January 1996, Vladimir Rudenko was baptized in the Alexander Nevsky Cathedral. In the same year he passed obedience in churches and monasteries of the Novosibirsk Eparchy.

Since September 1997 he studied at the Novosibirsk Orthodox Theological Institute and spent his first semester.

On 17 April 1998, Archimandrite Nikon (Fomin) tonsured him a monk and named him John in honour of John the Forerunner.

In 1998, John was ordained a deacon (24 May) and a presbyter (4 October). 1998–1999, he was a teacher at the Ivanovo Orthodox Theological Institute of the Apostle John the Theologian; since 1999, he has been the first vice-rector of the institute. In June 1999, he was appointed acting abbot of the Church of All Saints under construction at Ivanovo State University.

He took correspondence courses from the Moscow Theological Seminary (1998–2001) and the Moscow Theological Academy (2001–2005).

In 2000–2005 John taught at Ivanovo State University and Shuya State Pedagogical University and in 2005–2014 at Saint Alexis Ivanovo-Voznesensk Orthodox Theological Seminary. In 2001–2005 and 2007–2009 he was the director of the Boarding School for Boys at the Nikolo-Shartomsky Monastery.

In 2005–2006, he was the abbot of the Church of the Icon of the Mother of God Joy of All Who Sorrow in Ivanovo.

In 2006, he defended his thesis for the degree of Candidate of Theology on the topic The experience of building a dogmatic system based on the works of Saint Basil the Great (Опыт построения догматической системы по творениям святого Василия Великого).

On 23 April 2016, Patriarch Kirill of Moscow and All Russia named him Bishop of Vorkuta and Usinsk.

On 28 December 2017, he was appointed vicar of the Moscow Eparchy and relieved from the administration of the Vorkuta Eparchy. On 9 January 2018, the priest was appointed administrator of the North-Eastern Moscow Vicariate and rector of the Church of the Life-Giving Trinity in Sviblovo. In 2018–2019, he was co-chair of the Commission for Work with Higher Education Institutions and the Scientific Community under the Diocesan Council of Moscow.

In July 2018, he was appointed Abbot of the Novospassky Stauropegial Monastery (July 14) and dismissed from the post of rector of the Church of the Life-Giving Trinity in Sviblov (20 July); on July 27, he was relieved of the administration of the North-Eastern Vicariate and appointed administrator of the South-Eastern Vicariate and the Vicariate of the New Territories of Moscow, as well as the deanery of stauropegial parishes and Patriarchal Compounds in Moscow Oblast.

On 24 January 2019, he was relieved of the administration of the South-Eastern Vicariate of Moscow, but retained the post of administrator of the Vicariate of the New Territories of Moscow, as well as the deanery of stauropegial parishes and Patriarchal Compounds outside of Moscow. On 26 February 2019, John left the position of Abbot of the Novospassky Monastery.

On 4 April 2019, by the decision of the Holy Synod, he was appointed bishop of Urzhum and Omutninsk, and on 7 April 2019, relieved of his position as administrator of the vicariate of the New Territories of Moscow and the deanery of stauropegial parishes and Patriarchal Compounds outside Moscow.
