= Maxim Ignatovich =

Russian ice hockey player

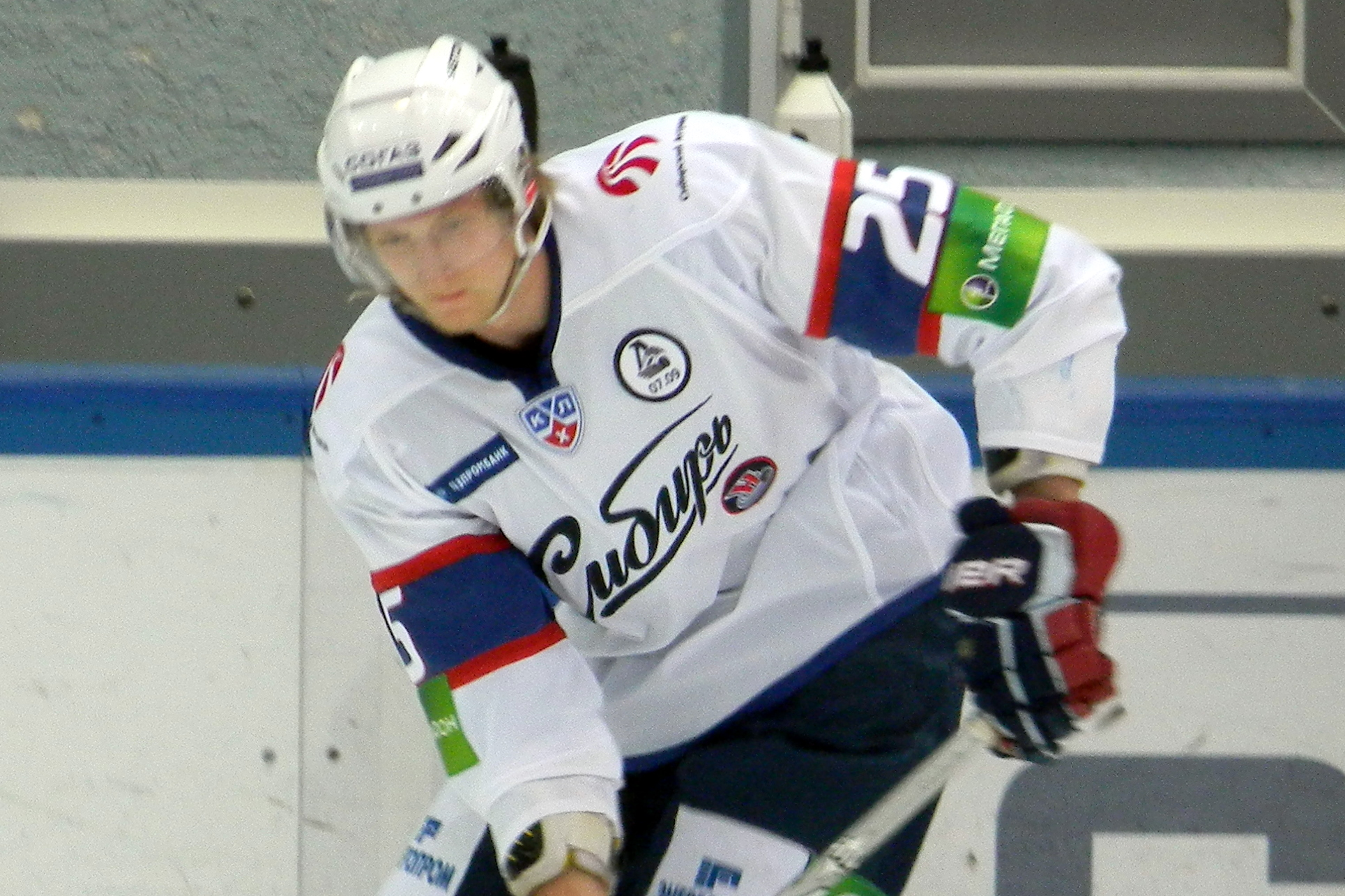
- Born: 7 April 1991 (age 34) Novosibirsk, Russian SFSR, Soviet Union
- Height: 6 ft 4 in (193 cm)
- Weight: 192 lb (87 kg; 13 st 10 lb)
- Position: Defenseman
- Shoots: Right
- PHL team Former teams: Cracovia Krakow; Sibir Novosibirsk; Neftekhimik Nizhnekamsk; Amur Khabarovsk
- Playing career: 2009–present

Maxim Ignatovich (Russian: Максим Андреевич Игнатович; born 7 April 1991) is a Russian professional ice hockey player. He is currently playing with Cracovia Krakow of the Polska Hokej Liga (PHL).

Ignatovich made his Kontinental Hockey League (KHL) debut with HC Sibir Novosibirsk, appearing in eight games during the 2009–10 season.
