= Mid-Game =

1991 short story by Victor Pelevin

- Author: Victor Pelevin
- Language: Russian
- Genre: Short story
- Publication date: 1991
- Publication place: Russia
- Media type: Print (Paperback)
- ISBN: 5-85950-013-0

Mid-Game (Russian: «Миттельшпиль») is a short story by Victor Pelevin, published in 1991.

== Plot ==
In the story, Pelevin's theme of the existence and destruction of borders and the emergence of alternative, including absurd, reality is clearly evident.

The story is set at the boundary of an era, in the transition from Soviet rule to the new democracy. The main protagonists of the story are the expensive foreign-currency prostitutes Lusya and Nelli (in Soviet times, foreign-currency prostitutes were called those who worked with foreigners and were paid in foreign currency, not rubles). The space of the story is made up of several worlds, and once again, seemingly autonomous worlds prove to be permeable.

First, Lucia, a prostitute working with foreign clients, appears at the center of the narrative. Her space is made up of expensive Moscow hotels "Intourist", "Moscow", "Minsk" and similarly expensive restaurants. She has an expensive fur coat, "a weightless sweater with silver sequins.

Next to her there is another closed world, such as a stall selling coffee and related products. The saleswoman at the stall is habitually dozing by the grill on a cold evening and, having received her order, "got up, walked over to the counter and looked with familiar hatred at Liusya's fox coat."

Liusya easily crosses the boundaries between worlds, goes from floor to floor in expensive hotels, she is let in behind a thick velvet cord that blocks the entrance to an elite restaurant, where "the Soviet citizens who want to get into the restaurant were crowded."

For this story Pelevin found an ingenious plot twist. Both heroines, Lyusya and Nelli, were former Komsomol functionaries, men who were well acquainted from their work in the same district committee. However, both had sex reassignment surgery and did not recognize each other in the new female form.

Not only that, but another pair of heroes, naval officers Valera and Vadim, serving on a submarine, turned out to be former women and sisters Varya and Tamara, who had changed sex to the opposite. These officers, based on the high moral values they absorbed while serving in the army, are maniacs who kill prostitutes by putting various chess pieces in their mouths after killing them.

Liusya and Nelli fall into their hands, but fight them off and even show sympathy for them.

The short and stormy period of general change at the end of the last century, the destruction of boundaries between social groups, the cessation of the usual and reliably functioning social elevators caused a shocking reaction in society. Most people found themselves on the verge of survival.

Gender reassignment surgery itself does not seem extraordinary. However, the stylistic representation of this fact in the context of the story and its use for all four main characters looks grotesque, revealing the absurdity of both what is happening and reality itself.

Despite the physical changes that have occurred to the characters, their way of thinking remains the old, Soviet way of thinking. Any reminder of her former life makes Lucy feel nostalgic. Nella, on the other hand, sometimes feels as if she is still following the party line. The sex-changed sailors feel something similar.

The Russian title of the story, "Mittelspiel," literally means a chess term for the middle of a chess game.

The heroes of the story live at the crossroads of eras, and in their minds there is a struggle between the Soviet and post-Soviet worlds. They try to destroy everything old in themselves, but they do not manage to do it completely.
