= Ivan Kulakov =

Russian painter

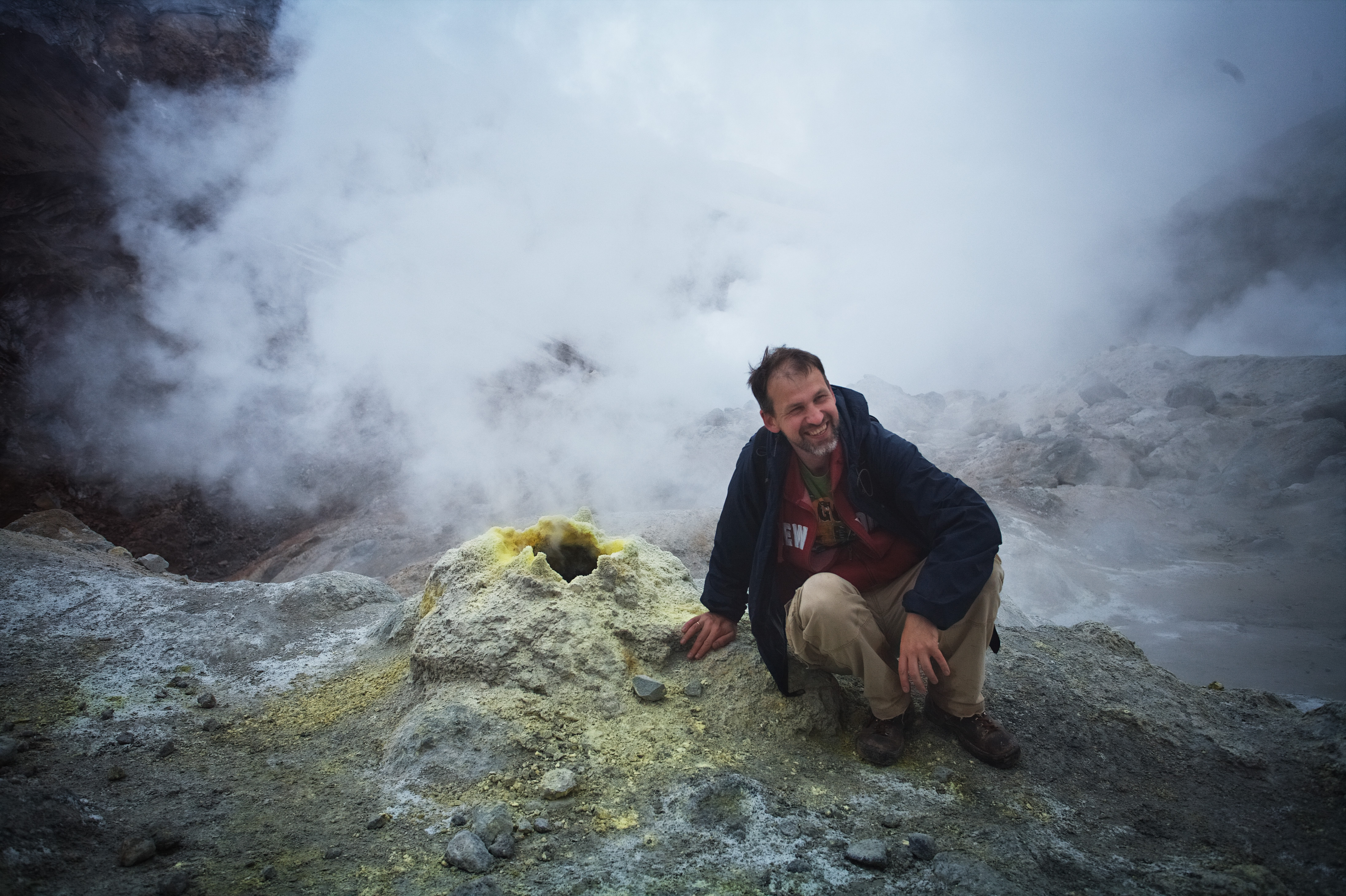
Ivan Kulakov

Ivan Yuryevich Kulakov (Russian: Ива́н Ю́рьевич Кулако́в; born July 15, 1967) is a Russian geophysicist and artist.

Kulakov was born in Novosibirsk in Siberia. During his childhood Ivan visited the lectures his father Professor Yury Kulakov conducted on both classical and contemporary art. The museums of the former Soviet Union, along with the paintings and photographs his father showed him, have had a significant influence on Kulakov's art. Today he says that these lectures were much more important to his development as an artist than any school of arts or university could have been. The symbiosis of his scientific career and art career has allowed Kulakov to exhibit in many countries.
