= News from Nepal =

1991 short story by Victor Pelevin

- Author: Victor Pelevin
- Language: Russian
- Genre: Short story
- Publication date: 1991
- Publication place: Russia
- Media type: Print (Paperback)
- ISBN: 5-85950-013-0

News from Nepal (Russian: «Вести из Непала») is a short story by Victor Pelevin, published in 1991.

== Plot ==
In the story The Tibetan Book of the Dead, Pelevin translates it into the Soviet language. The heroes of the story are dead, and they are read an instruction book on how to behave for the first forty days.

In the story, the author is ironic about the Soviet state system, according to Pelevin's idea it is the Soviet reality is a nightmare dream for the characters. The action of the story takes place as it seems at first glance in reality, but gradually the reader begins to understand that the world is actually a fiction.

The story begins with a description of an ordinary working morning of Lyubochka, a rationalization engineer at the trolleybus park. She jumps out of the door of the trolley bus right into a puddle and walks to work. Gradually details creep in that make you doubt the realism of the action, as well as the heavy mood of the story is built up.

The heroes of the story are in a state of sleep - oblivion, which is controlled by a certain demonic force and which is equated with hell, the author at the beginning of the story declares the hopelessness of the situation of people, about their powerlessness before this force.

The description of the dirty street and the gloomy weather also play a role in creating a mystically gloomy environment. Even the heroine of the story, Lyubochka, smiles not as a result of sudden feelings, but because she is forced to: "and when she smiled, it was obvious that she does it with effort and as if performing the only service action she is capable of." The usual Soviet-era lifestyles of the protagonist, who works in the trolleybus park and runs errands for the director, are disrupted by strange events. First, she attends a conversation with her colleagues in which it is revealed that electric current can flow through the air. Then Lyubochka meets two strange strangers in "long nightgowns," one of whom answers her question, "aren't they cold?" that they are dreaming about the whole thing.

As the narrative continues, strange mystical signs occur more and more frequently, adding to the heavy mood of the story.

Soon the story's protagonist discovers a memo in her pocket about the "Many Faces of Kathmandu," telling of a paradisiacal life in Nepal. In the memo, Pelevin describes a kind of socialist paradise that the author believes is taking shape in the minds of some Soviet citizens.

In the end, during a work team meeting, the bitter truth is revealed - it is the first day of the story's characters after death in the parody afterlife, when, according to orthodox dogma, the so-called airy publicities (torments) begin - the characters experience about the same as they did when they were alive. The story ends as it begins, perhaps influenced by the stories of Vladimir Nabokov, one of Pelevin's favorite writers. The black stripe on the heroine's white blouse turns out to be a tread mark. Having realized her own death, Lyubochka rushes to the door, but it turns out to be the door of a moving trolleybus.

In the story "News from Nepal" the author sneers at the Soviet reality, which has become for the characters a horrible dream, close to hell. From the very beginning it speaks of the hopelessness of people's situation in this world. The truth that the heroes are already in another world is presented in the form of political information by the radio announcer.
