= Nina Sadur =

Russian prose writer and playwright (1950–2023)

Nina Nikolayevna Sadur
- Born: Nina Nikolayevna Kolesnikova; 15 October 1950; Novosibirsk, Russian SFSR, USSR
- Died: 12 November 2023 (aged 73); Moscow, Russia
- Occupations: Prose writer and playwright
- Children: Yekaterina Sadur
- Writing career
- Literary movement: Magic realism Postmodernism; Theatre of the Absurd

Nina Nikolayevna Sadur (Russian: Нина Николаевна Садур, (born Nina Nikolayevna Kolesnikova; 15 October 1950 – 12 November 2023), also known as Nína Mikháilovna Sadúr, was a Russian prose writer and playwright. She was known for being "one of the leading proponents of the 'new drama' of the 1980s, whose avant-garde vision is dark, mystic, and absurdist."

== Early life and education ==
Nina Nikolayevna Sadur was born on 15 October 1950, in Novosibirsk, Russia. She grew up in an intellectual family in a working-class neighborhood of Novosibirsk and experienced a "sense of alienation and fascination for the common folk, the 'other'." Her mother taught Russian literature and was an actress in amateur plays while her father was a poet. Sadur began writing poetry and prose at a young age. As a child, Sadur had an interest in literature and nature. She wanted to become an entomologist but decided to pursue literature instead when she decided that dissecting insects went against her love of the natural world.

Sadur attended the Sixth All-Union Conference for Young Dramatists at the House of Writers in Dubolty, Latvia and studied at the Faculty of Library Science of the Moscow Institute of Culture. She studied under Russian dramatist Viktor Rozov and critic Inna Vishnevskaia at the Maxim Gorky Literature Institute in Moscow, graduating in 1983.

== Literary career ==
Sadur wrote short stories and plays while working as a cleaner at the Pushkin Theatre to support herself. In 1982, she wrote The Wondrous Wrench, which was performed at the Lenkom and Ermolova as well as by the Moscow University student theatre. The play told the story of a game of tag played in a potato field which "may spell the end of the world" and was recognized as a "turning point in modern Russian drama." In 1982, she also wrote The Incriminated Swallow. The following year, she wrote Go On!, The Power of the Voice and Dawn Will Come Up. Some of her other works have included They Froze (1987), The Devil in Love, By Magic, Pannochka, A Nose, Brother Chichikov, and Red Paradise (1988). Red Paradise was a "brutally absurdist" play in which "Soviet tourists to a Crimean fortress, attempting to plunder the treasures of ancient civilizations, meet repeated violent ends." In 1977, she published a semi-autobiographical longer prose work called This Is My Window. In 1989, Sadur joined the Writer's Union.

Sadur described her style as being the "realm of the illusory" or "magical realism." Her influences include Gabriel Garcia Márquez, Ray Bradbury, and Clifford Simak.

In 1994, Melissa T. Smith described Sadur's work: "Her prose works, in which narrative perspective is subject to abrupt shifts between internal and external, first and third persons, present a dark vision of contemporary reality. The everyday world, byt, is not the ground of existence, but a thin veil behind which the reader quickly discovers a lurking 'other' – the struggle of good and evil, black magic and Orthodox Christianity."

In 1999, Christine D. Tomei described a hallmark of Sadur's work as being "a strong interest in the everyday details of Soviet life."

In 2014, Sadur published The Witching Hour and Other Plays. Middlebury professor Thomas R. Beyer characterized the work as "[leading] us into the darkness of the human spirit as the Russian literature of Gogol and Dostoevsky has so often done." The Times Literary Supplement wrote about the book, "Sadur's plays are discomforting; they uproot certainties, allowing deep and ugly forces to disrupt the strained surface of Soviet life."

== Personal life and death ==
Sadur had a daughter, Yekaterina Sadur, who is also known as Katia. Yekaterina has published books as well as written for film and theatre.

According to a source published in 1994, Sadur was living in a communal apartment in Moscow with her mother and daughter.

Nina Sadur died in Moscow on 12 November 2023, at the age of 73.
