= The Tarzan Swing =

1994 short story by Victor Pelevin

- Short story by Victor Pelevin
- Language: Russian

Publication
- Publication date: 1994
- Publication place: Russia
- Media type: Print (Paperback)

"The Tarzan Swing" (Russian: «Тарзанка») is a short story by Victor Pelevin, published in 1994.

== Plot ==
The main motifs of Pelevin's story are the themes of sleep, loneliness, the ascent to an unknown goal, and the mortality of the human world.

The main character of the story Peter Petrovich together with the unfamiliar interlocutor are walking through the night city in the light of the moon on a silvery path. Peter Petrovich argues about the meaning of life, about faith, about the human soul.

His interlocutor is speechless and wears a dark hood that hides his face. At some point Peter Petrovich begins to suspect that the stranger is his own reflection. He sees a cable hanging from the wall and recalls a childhood pastime: bungee jumping.

To check if the person he is talking to is a reflection, Petr Petrovich hangs on the cable and, swinging, hits the person he is talking to. It turns out that the interlocutor is not his reflection. In response to Petr Petrovich's request to tell him the truth, the interlocutor replies: "Does the word 'lunatic' mean anything to you?" And then Petr Petrovich realizes that he is standing on the ledge of a house thirty meters above the ground. The tin ledge was the silvery path. Peter Petrovich is horrified. The interlocutor moves away, and Petr Petrovich unsuccessfully tries to remember who he was.

In the end, the story ends safely for Pyotr Petrovich: "He turned back, stepped around the corner and easily jumped down a few meters, where it was more comfortable to walk... He looked around one last time, then meekly looked up, smiled and slowly wandered along the shimmering silver lane."

One might suggest that the Dream of the Soul in the story is an evil that gets in the way of going forward. Everyone around him is asleep and only Peter Petrovich walks forward because he is awake. And this path along the moonlit path is endless. This path is interpreted as the road of truth, surrounded on all sides by darkness. The hero sometimes veers off the path, pursuing erroneous goals, but in the end he still returns to this road.

The space in the story "The Tarzan Swing" is distinct and concrete, and it is possible to visualize it. The lyrical hero is contrasted with the people. He is not with them, but beyond the windows, which are very often mentioned in the story, and he goes to the truth.

The silvery road is the path of truth, moving along which the main character becomes happy. The road is surrounded by darkness on all sides. The hero strayed from the true path, plunging into the darkness, pursuing erroneous goals (he chased a cat, which ended up being a package). But he returns to the road of truth all the same.

The hero travels through parts of space as the story progresses. At the end, the reader sees him move to a new level: the ledge of a house. The hero climbs higher and higher, eventually becoming "a perfectly happy man."

There are several boundaries in the space of the story, which are the basis for the oppositions: street - apartment; the lyrical hero - the people outside the windows; the moon - the human world; the top - the bottom.

The theme of sleep is revealed in the story as follows: the lyrical hero's soul used to be awake and now wakes up only rarely. Sleep in the story is evil and the impossibility to move forward to the eternal. All the people around are asleep; only the protagonist can move forward because he is awake.
