= Vyacheslav Shalygin =

Russian science fiction writer (born 1968)

Vyacheslav Vladimirovich Shalygin (Russian: Вячесла́в Влади́мирович Шалы́гин) is a Russian science fiction writer, born in 1968 in Novosibirsk where he still lives.

== Biography ==
Shalygin was drafted into the Soviet Army in 1986 after only one year in a medical school. He left the army in 1988 at the rank of starshina and finished the medical school in 1993. He started writing fiction in 1998 and the following year his first book was published.

== List of works ==
- Eye of the Peacock ("Глаз Павлина") series
  - Eye of the Peacock – Darwin was wrong, as Dandy and Eric, employees of an unusual detective agency, have discovered - among our ancestors were werewolves and Atlanteans... Both races carefully protect the secrets of their ancient civilizations and meddle in human affairs only when absolutely necessary. One of these moments have arrived: the existence of the three races is threatened by an unknown force. This means that Dandy and Eric, who already have a full plate, have even more work to do.
  - Import of Justice ("Импорт правосудия") – apparently, Earth is not only the human homeworld but also of two others: Atlanteans, vague mentions of whom have been preserved in ancient manuscripts, and man-wolves, known to us through the scary stories about insidious werewolves. Private investigators Eric and Dandy know firsthand that there is truth in every story - it was them who were previously involved in a bitter struggle for the legacy of the ancient races. A year passed after those events, but, so far, nobody has been able to locate the Projector. Now, there is a new misfortune - Creatures from beyond the Edge, sentient beings of pure energy. The way to combat them is written on a scroll, one half of which is owned by the wolves, and the other - by the Atlanteans.
- Falcon ("Сокол") series
  - The Hunt for Falcon ("Охота на Сокола") – the soldiers fell, cut down by the hail of bullets from his machinegun, and Sasha finally understood the main thing - he became a killer... Only several hours ago he turned from a simple scientist into the carrier of the mysterious "Falcon", giving him supernatural abilities. Now Sasha can control the electronic "seine" which enmeshed the entire planet. However, there turned out to be too many of those who wish to possess such might. Absolute power over the world drew the competition - the "Reds", the "Blacks", and the "Whites". All government "agencies" were full of double- and triple-agents. Sasha became the target of a true manhunt. The most terrible thing, however, is that one of the groups decided to use his wife and child as bait.
  - Dr. Falcon ("Dr. Сокол")
  - Falcon's Mission ("Миссия Сокола")
  - Falcon's Fury ("Ярость Сокола")
- Path from the Skies ("Путь с небес") – the interests of the ruler of Callisto, Knyaz Sergey Preobrazhensky, never went far beyond the moons of Jupiter... well, maximum - the Solar System. Fate arrive to the knyaz in the form of a strange Chinese merchant, who predicted the appearance of a mysterious Boundary in deep space, which led to the destruction of many inhabited worlds. Sergey became involved in cruel games of the Firstborn. He must fight those who tries to free the multidimensional Universe from the presence of humans at any cost.
- No Future ("Будущего.net") (net means no in Russian) – it is difficult to be a chosen one. Especially when you do not know who or why chose you and what awaits beyond the multitude of incredible adventures into which you were dragged... Security Lieutenant Vladimir Volkov with each step kept feeling more and more how the Noose of Time, dividing the fates of two parallel worlds, tightened itself around his neck. In one of the worlds, reality strangely interwove itself with virtual reality, and the price of failure in a computer game was real death. The other world was not much better - it was in the middle of a nuclear winter. The masters of that world were mutants, who wanted to own Future itself, leaving normal humans only one right - to become a food source.
- Aquarius Rising ("Восход Водолея") – what was on the strange tape, which several government agencies were looking for? Who ripped apart the terrorists who hijacked a plane? Cyborgs? But who controls them and, more importantly, how?.. In these disturbing times, it is as if nature went insane - earthquakes, hurricanes, and floods followed one another. Perhaps, this severe universal wisdom was trying to save humanity from itself.
- The Enemy Inside ("Враг внутри")
- Blood of the Titans ("Кровь титанов") – the existence of the race of Titans - wise supermen and great Warriors, created in Earth laboratories as a result of genetic experimentation, is threatened. Their comrades, killed in battles past, somehow returned with their spaceships, attack and defeat their former colleagues. Pilot-Titan Aleksey Turkin must engage in a crucial battle with invincible invisibles and uncover the dreadful secrets of mighty races.
- The Fall of the "Galaxy" ("Падение «Галактики»") – in the middle of an interplanetary plot known by a significant name "Galaxy" and additional threat was thoroughly concealed. This threat was a thousand times more terrible - an alien. The conspirators themselves were only pawns in the insidious game of the envoy from other worlds. However, even the heartless monsters, who sent him to the human sector of space in preparation for an invasion, were panically afraid of others following in their wake. Humanity defends its right to remain itself through incredible battles and agonizing meditations.
- Legacy of Others ("Чужое наследие")
- Exam for Humanoids ("Экзамен для гуманоидов") – not only mafia is immortal but also intelligence. Especially planetary intelligence, the agents of which attempt to defuse the powder keg of a new space conflict without revealing themselves. This is especially important when the enemies are the arrogant and numerous nomads-amoebas, who couldn't care less about the galactic laws and the wild, backward planet Earth. When it is time to stop hiding, weapons of the spies become ordinary laser rifles, their allies - space marines-traders, and the language of interstellar communication - the sound of bullets striking an armored suit.
- Our Purple Brothers ("Наши фиолетовые братья")
- Immortality of the Mercenary ("Бессмертие наемника") – they always have been and always will be. They were sent to the most deadly places, but they always came back. They were blamed for the stupidity of generals and miscalculations of politicians, and their victories were appropriated by others. They have never known glory but were always attracted to gold. They are the mercenaries. Let them be despised and accused of all deadly sins, but, whether it is under the walls of Troy or at the edge of the galaxy, they remain true to their unwritten code of honor. That is why they are immortal, because, if necessary, they are capable of travelling through time... as long as there is a reward!
- Future Dream ("Сон грядущий")
- Cure for Happiness ("Лекарство от счастья")
- The Fight with the Shadow ("Бой с тенью")
- Iron City ("Железный город")
- The Fifth Galactic War ("Пятая космическая")
- War for the Revival ("Война за возрождение")
- Fire, Vodka, and Copper Corpses ("Огонь, водка и медные трупы")
- The Best Defense ("Лучшая защита")
- Looking through the Sun ("Взгляд сквозь Солнце")
- Mad Dog ("Бешеный пес")
