= Tai Shou Chuan USSR =

1991 short story by Victor Pelevin

- Author: Victor Pelevin
- Language: Russian
- Genre: Short story
- Publication date: 1991
- Publication place: Russia
- Media type: Print (Paperback)
- ISBN: 5-85950-013-0

Tai Shou Chuan USSR (Russian: «СССР Тайшоу Чжуань») is a short story by Victor Pelevin, published in 1991.

== Plot ==
The story is constructed in a pseudo-historical form and is a deconstruction of real events. And it is a reference to the Chinese Tang dynasty story "The Governor of Nanke". The author himself dubbed this short work "A Chinese Folk Tale". Or, the setting is a communist utopia in an alternate China.

According to another opinion, the story resembles the construction of short stories by the famous Chinese writer Pu Songling from the collections "Monk Magicians" and "Tales of Extraordinary People".

The title of the story is "Tai Shou Chuan USSR". From the Chinese literary language, "Chuan" can be translated as "a collection of stories, essays, or legends." The character "Tai Shou" is more polysemantic, it translates as "commander of the army in the provinces" or simply "chief", "leader". Consequently, the title of the story should be understood as "A collection of essays by a certain leader about his life in the USSR.

In the Chinese story, which Pelevin has looked up to, there is a strong influence of Buddhism and Taoism. In particular, the key theme is the Taoist ideologeme "life is like a dream. The Chinese "Tradition" tells of Chun Yukun's adventures in the unfamiliar land of Sophora. One day Chun Yukun got drunk and fell asleep under a sophora. He was then sent to the country of Sophora, where he married a princess. There he obtained a prestigious government position. After many years of a successful career, however, a turning point comes in his life: the death of the princess, the king's suspicions, and repatriation. After this, Chun Yukun wakes up and it turns out that he has been sleeping in his yard under a sophora, and it is still the same day. Finding the anthill, Chun Yukun recalls everything.

In the story "Tai Shou Chuan USSR" instead of the knight Chun Yukun is the bum Zhang, who in the virtual world becomes one of the leaders of the USSR. Pelevin refers to the leader of the USSR as "Son of Bread" and Zhang as "Sausage". In this way the author sought to emphasize the predominance of materialism and utilitarianism in human nature. One gets the impression that the Soviet state under Zhang's rule is powerful and prosperous. In reality, however, statehood exists there only nominally. Mentioning the former viceroy, who hid the fact that his head was cut off, the author satirically shows the numbing of the workers and their sinking into a world of illusions.

"Tai Shou Chuan USSR," like the Chinese "Tradition," is imbued with the ideas of Taoism. An important part of both works is the image of the anthill. And if in Chinese philosophy the ant is a symbol of universal life and is able to build a state on a rational basis, then Pelevin identifies the anthill with a totalitarian society with rigid centralization, complete unification and obedience of individuals. The anthills are also dealt with in different ways: Chun Yukun in The Legend asked his friends not to touch him, while Pelevin's Zhang "diluted chlorine in two buckets and poured it on the anthill.
