= Sister Pelagia =

Sister Pelagia is a fictional 19th century Russian nun, the protagonist of a three-book series of mystery novels by Boris Akunin.

== First novel ==
The first novel, Pelagia and the White Bulldog (US title: Sister Pelagia and the White Bulldog) (Пелагия и белый бульдог) is set in Zavolzhsk and the surrounding countryside. It centers around the arrival from St. Petersburg of an Inquisitor from the Holy Synod and the great evils that follow. It was published in English in 2006 by Weidenfeld & Nicolson with ISBN 0-297-84862-3.

== Second novel ==
In the second novel, Pelagia and the Black Monk (US title: Sister Pelagia and the Black Monk) (Пелагия и черный монах), Pelagia investigates strange events in a remote island monastery in Mitrofanii's diocese (on the islands in the fictional Blue Lake). The plot contains many allusions to Umberto Eco's The Name of the Rose, Anton Chekhov's Black Monk and several novels by Dostoevsky. It was published in English in 2007 by Weidenfeld & Nicolson with ISBN 0-297-85086-5.

== Depiction of millennialism and sectarianism ==
In Pelagia and the Red Rooster (US title: Sister Pelagia and the Red Cockerel) (Пелагия и красный петух), the action takes the reader from a steamboat on the Volga to Stroganovka, a fictional village near the Urals, and on to Jerusalem, an early Zionist commune in Megiddo and to Sodom. Events in Imperial Russia move to Zhytomyr and Saint Petersburg. The context is the flourishing millennialism and sectarianism in 19th century Imperial Russia.
