= The Tambourine of the Upper World =

1993 short story by Victor Pelevin

Tambourine of the Upper World
- Cover of The Blue Lantern and Other Stories
- Author: Victor Pelevin
- Language: Russian
- Genre: Short story
- Publication date: 1993
- Publication place: Russia
- Media type: Print (Paperback)
- ISBN: 0811214346

Tambourine of the Upper World (Russian: «Бубен Верхнего мира») is a short story by Victor Pelevin, published in 1993.

== Plot ==
The story can be attributed to those works of the author that are devoted to Buddhist themes, esoterics, the image of "altered states of consciousness.

In the story, the heroine named Tanya, with the help of the shamaness Tyima, put on a commercial basis the summoning from the lower world of the war dead soldiers, Germans, Spaniards, Italians, and Finns. The soldiers who are resurrected and return to our world retain their citizenship, allowing Russian girls to marry them and go abroad.

The service is paid for and the business is so popular that the queue for a shamaness in Moscow is booked two years in advance. Mysteries of shamaness Tyima should take place directly on a place of a military burial, therefore Tanya by maps studies the tanks which have remained from times of war, the planes which have fallen in bogs. To these places she goes together with those wishing to marry a resurrected foreigner.

Another trip to a dark forest near Moscow, where a downed German Henkel plane fell during World War II, ends unexpectedly. In the underworld, from which the resurrected usually come, the shamaness does not find the right "client." Not wanting to refuse her friend Masha, Tanya asks the shamaness to search for him in the upper world, something they have never done before. The search ends successfully, but an unforeseen surprise occurs. Instead of the German pilot from the upper world, a Soviet Major Zvyagintsev, who was ferrying a trophy plane to an alternate airfield and was somehow shot down, which is unpleasant for him to recall even today.

The Soviet pilot is of no interest to the girls who want to live abroad in order to fulfill his goal. However, the plot continues to develop unpredictably.

The point of intersection of the two worlds (upper and lower) becomes the depicted reality, which is structured by spatial and temporal reference points, giving it a seeming stability.

The wartime is indirectly indicated by the name of the platform ("Forty-third kilometer"), where the girls and the shamaness got off the train. The station lived up to its name because there were no human settlements nearby.

The previous station "Krematovo" (from the word crematorium in Russian) also lived up to its name: right behind the platform "there were squat buildings with many pipes of varying height and diameter, some of them faintly smoky. Nothing indicates their industrial purpose, and only the name definitely refers to the word "crematorium.

The artistic world that emerges has a permeability in time and space. The dead penetrate it, it is open to the historical past and at the same time connected to the near future: the resurrected warriors live for about three years, and the girls get to arrange their futures abroad.

Space and time lose their stable characteristics, become heterogeneous, and today's reality is no longer perceived as something stable and balanced. Existing reference points, both temporal and spatial, are conventional in nature.

Half of the forest is fenced with barbed wire, but no one goes there even without a fence. The road, which began at the platform, already in 300-400 meters disappears into the woods.

But Masha saw a vivid spatial image of her life as a road leading nowhere: "Her own life, started twenty-five years ago by an unknown will, suddenly seemed to her exactly the same road - at first straight and smooth, planted with straight rows of simple truths, and then forgotten by an unknown authority and turned into a curvy path leading nowhere."

Emotionally open and pure, Masha even thought that the components of the surrounding space (bushes and trees, grass and dark clouds) "parted under the beats of the tambourine, and in the gaps between them opened for a moment a strange, bright and unfamiliar world."

The fabulous epilogue only emphasizes the permeability and conventionality of all three worlds. Masha, who has taken a liking to Major Zvyagintsev, receives a reed pipe from him, with which she can summon him herself from the upper world and go there to visit.

Masha has been on the road to nowhere for twenty-five years; she is lost in this world, as in the forest. Now the girl is internally ready to go to the upper world, so she accepts the invitation to come and visit Major Zvyagintsev.

Masha now has no need to wander through this modern and alien world, she does not need to go to Arkhangelsk, where Tanya found in the swamp downed American B-29, "Flying Fortress" with a crew of eleven people, which "all enough, to move to the United States.

== See also ==
- The Tambourine of the Lower World
