= Prince of Gosplan =

1991 novella by Victor Pelevin

- Author: Victor Pelevin
- Language: Russian
- Genre: Novella
- Publication date: 1991
- Publication place: Russia
- Media type: Print (Paperback)
- ISBN: 978-5-699-48691-5

Prince of Gosplan (Russian: «Принц Госплана») is a novella by Victor Pelevin, published in 1991 in Russia.

== Plot ==
The protagonist of the novel is Sasha Lapin, a young specialist who works in the IT department of Gossnab (State Supplies). Along the way he plays one of the most popular games of the time, "Prince of Persia"; his co-workers also play computer games, such as "Abrams Battle Tank". Sasha's boss wants him to get some documents signed at Gosplan (the State Planning Committee), which involves making his way to higher levels of the video game and confronting the game's guardian figures. At one point one of the guards knocks him out but doesn’t kill him, because he happens to be carrying a copy of The Sufi Orders in Islam, by J. Spencer Trimingham, so the guard assumes he must be a spiritual man; they have a conversation about Afghanistan and he tells the guard a long story about a prayer rug. In the end he manages to get the documents signed and starts the game again at Level 1.

== Analysis ==
"Prince of Persia" is one of the first computer games to appear in the early '90s, with a bookish, romantic plot and movie-like graphics. For the users this game was a real sensation. After all, the screen was no longer a circle eating dots on a black background, but colorful characters: a prince, janissaries with yatagans in turbans and picturesque clothes, a beautiful princess and an evil wizard in a sharp cap and gown. All of the characters are perfectly "written out" and move smoothly, like in a classic cartoon like "Snow White". The hero must save the princess by overcoming a complex maze of corridors, traps and defeating all the guards. But if you try to imagine the future, in terms of the game, each subsequent level is just a more difficult version of the previous one for the player. Then why strive forward? Is there an incentive to climb farther and farther? Sasha has that incentive – the princess, which will be a reward for the prince, when he reaches the very end of the game. But in real life, no princess is waiting for Lapin.

In the world of the game, of course, life is much easier. The laws of the game are clear and simple. Not as in the real world, where everything is so confusing that even a lifetime to figure it out. Maybe it is because of the clarity of the game world is so attractive to humans that they are willing to easily swap it for the real world. At the end, the main character will have to answer the questions. Who is he really an employee of the Gossnab or a prince? Does the princess exist and is it possible to get to her? Where is reality and where is only fiction? What is in fact the real world?
