= The Ontology of Childhood =

1991 short story by Victor Pelevin

- Author: Victor Pelevin
- Language: Russian
- Genre: Short story
- Publication date: 1991
- Publication place: Russia
- Media type: Print (Paperback)
- ISBN: 5-85950-013-0

The Ontology of Childhood (Russian: «Онтология детства») is a short story by Victor Pelevin, published in 1991.

== Plot ==
In the story the author undertakes an artistic study of the process of formation of the child, starting from the moment of awareness of himself as a person, fixing the main stages of understanding of the world around him.

The hero of the story grew up in prison, his first impressions of childhood firmly imprinted spatial reference points, which in the conditions of limited senses became the fundamental basis of his worldview. Among them is the gap between the bricks, in which "you can see a frozen strip of mortar, curved in a wave. This was what the child first saw when waking up every morning: "the sunny hare in the gap between the bricks was the first morning greeting from the vast world in which we live...".

The streak of sunshine through the window is filled with fluffy dust particles and the tiniest twisted hairs. It begins to seem to the child that there is some little world living according to its own laws: he sees "all around him disguised areas of complete freedom and happiness.

Thus, in the story, the traditional motif of the formation and maturation of personality is embodied in the continuous world of the author. The second-person narrative creates the necessary reflection and allows the main metaphor of the story to unfold in parallel. V. Pelevin speaks about the desire to break free from prison and at the same time conducts the idea of overcoming the limited human consciousness, being in captivity of illusions about the conditions of his being.

For the child who is not aware that he is in prison, the basic qualities and parameters of being are deprived of a sense of unfreedom. On the contrary, he perceives his space as expanding because his little one "was let out for a whole day, and you could walk all the corridors, look everywhere, and wander into places where you could be the first person after the construction workers."

The illusion of freedom in the confined world of the prison gradually emerges in the story. The real space and time-the prison space-contains signs of unfreedom: bars, closed doors, a dead end, a grid on the window, adults who confine the space.

The metaphysical dimensions, incomprehensible to a child's mind, contain signs of the meaninglessness of the world around them. This is the motif of reading in the story, during which the boy is surrounded by "meaningless blackness" as he encounters the unfamiliar words "ontology," "intellectual." Adult explanations do not clarify the meaning, and as the boy grows older himself, he begins to realize "how uninteresting and squalid all that you have managed to reread so many times.

Nevertheless, the child feels part of being, and his carefully guarded memories of life's best moments eventually become happiness. The child's vivid sense of happiness is associated with the conquest of space, with movement, that fundamental attribute of matter's existence. The boy takes the rare opportunity to run down the empty prison corridor.

The few seconds of incomparable freedom as he fits into a long arc on a bend cannot be destroyed even by the fact that the corridor ends in a dead end, a window draped with wire mesh.

The sounds inside the prison, uninteresting "because of their habituality and explainability," are contrasted with the sounds coming from the window - "the only evidence of the existence of the rest of the world, and every sound from there is extraordinarily important.

Understanding one's own existence transforms the child, separates him or her from the surrounding meaningless world and makes him or her self-sufficient. The world changes every day, acquiring a new shade of meaning. The boy's childhood world was brighter and happier because of the little joys of childhood. New dimensions come to the hero as he gains his experience.

As he grows older, his world becomes more and more uncomplicated, because there are fewer hidden things around him, which paradoxically leads to a reduction in the scale of personality, up to and including complete disappearance. It is not only the world that subtly changes in each particular moment. Human consciousness, according to Pelevin, is just as changeable.

In this way he arrives at a Buddhist understanding of the meaning of life.
