= Vera Pavlovna's Ninth Dream =

Short story by Victor Pelevin, published in 1991

- Author: Victor Pelevin
- Language: Russian
- Genre: Short story
- Publication date: 1991
- Publication place: Russia
- Media type: Print (Paperback)
- ISBN: 5-85950-013-0

Vera Pavlovna's Ninth Dream (Russian: «Девятый сон Веры Павловны») is a short story by Victor Pelevin, published in 1991.

== Plot ==
The title of the story is an allusion to the title of the novel "What Is to Be Done?" by Nikolai Chernyshevsky, where the main character's name was also Vera Pavlovna and the description of her four dreams was part of the novel.

Solipsism occupies a significant place in the works of Victor Pelevin: in addition to this story, the writer in one form or another addressed this topic in his other works. But the story "The Ninth Dream of Vera Pavlovna" is most closely associated with solipsism. One might say that solipsism is the main "hero" of the story.

The protagonist of the story, Vera Pavlovna, is in all likelihood a member of the Soviet intelligentsia. She reads Ramacharak and Blavatsky, watches films by Fassbinder and Bergman, and is a cleaner in the men's public toilet, which makes her image somewhat caricatured.

One day, a curious thought occurs to Vera: if you know the secret of existence, then the question of the meaning of life disappears on its own, because knowledge of the secret of life allows you "to control existence, that is, to really stop the old life and start a new one, not just talk about it - and each new life will have its own special meaning.

And Vera recognizes this mystery of life. The mystery of life is that the one who knows it can influence and create things around him: "I'll try something simple to begin with. For example, so that pictures could appear on the walls here and music could play.

Perestroika begins in the country, and Vera knows that the source of this change is herself. Soon thereafter, the toilet was privatized, its appearance greatly improved. After some time a picture appeared on the wall, then the director of the toilet brought in a tape recorder and loudspeakers. Music started playing in the building. The morning began with "Mass" by Giuseppe Verdi. Bach's "Christmas Oratorio" was followed by melodies by Mozart.

A little later, Vera becomes a janitor in a store that has replaced the public toilet. The improvement is evident.

The main character kept her friendship with Manyasha, the cleaner of the nearby women's restroom. The friend very often interfered in the life of Vera Pavlovna and constantly gave her advice. It was Manyasha who told her friend that only a person's desires determine his life. According to Pelevin's idea, Manyasha is the second part of the main character's soul.

Soon the restroom building was rebuilt as a store. And Vera Pavlovna began to feel that both goods and visitors stank of excrement. The woman began to blame Manyasha in her thoughts. And in one of her meetings, Vera Pavlovna struck a terrible blow with an axe on Manyasha's head, figuratively killing the part of her soul that connected her with reality.

In her hallucinations, the woman found herself at the Last Judgment, where she was sentenced to eternal imprisonment as one of the heroes of a realistic work of Russian literature. But it turned out that there were no vacant seats there. Then the judge decided to place Vera Pavlovna as the protagonist in Chernyshevsky's "What Is to Be Done?"
