= Bulldozer Driver's Day =

1991 short story by Victor Pelevin

- Author: Victor Pelevin
- Language: Russian
- Genre: Short story
- Publication date: 1991
- Publication place: Russia
- Media type: Print (Paperback)
- ISBN: 5-85950-013-0

Bulldozer Driver's Day (Russian: «День бульдозериста») is a short story by Victor Pelevin, published in 1991.

== Plot ==
The story shows the reality of the USSR of the 1970s and 1980s as seen by Pelevin. The satirical story is set in a fictional closed city. Soviet realities are taken to the point of absurdity: everyone is working on nuclear and chemical weapons, posters glorifying the three main ideologues of power hang everywhere, an allusion to Marx, Engels and Lenin.

The main character is an American spy who forgot about it, constantly drinking with the rest of the men. But an atomic bomb went off at the plant and hit him in the kidneys, which made the hero not drink for two weeks and remembered that he had to run away.

In the story, almost all of the dialogues of the main characters take place on Newspeak. However, it is worth noting that Orwell's Newspeak is based on the "destruction of words", on the truncation of meanings, while Pelevin, on the contrary, forms it to "increase the meanings". His speech constructions do not destroy the original meaning of the word, on the contrary, they give it other, additional meanings.

Thus the words, peace, labor, May, which were used in the Soviet Union as political slogans, are used in the story as components of a nonnormative vocabulary. Thus Plevin's deconstruction does not destroy the former meaning of the word, but gives it one new, additional meaning.

The super-real, esoteric meaning is revealed in the story as if accidentally, being discovered unexpectedly, suddenly, being voiced, for example, by a voice from the loudspeaker (voice from the ether).

The characters of the novel are both people with ordinary names and surnames and also the cogs of the big machine. The author tries in every way to show the duality of the world he is describing.

For example, the characters in the story "The Bulldozer's Day" fall out of the circle of obedience and coercion due to rather anecdotal circumstances: as a result of a severe injury at the factory (the hydrogen bomb factory), he never takes alcohol, experiencing in this way a strange piety – as if he had lost his life. In this painful state of mind.

The metamorphosis of the hero's consciousness replaces Pelevin's key process of liberation from the blackout, so that the satirical-magrotesque is replaced by surrealist techniques. Thus, the vision of a hero who has lost his consciousness in the muse of glory is presented as an allegory of patience and the meaning of life. From the turgid air and the layered cramped and blackened hut in which he is condemned to keep Kopchenov's son (an analogue of Kopchenov's cave with spiders, an emblem of death), the hero literally slips through the door, behind which he sees the sun, white light and a thin white silhouette (emblematic of light and open space).

In the second, unseen view, the hero flashes through a series of scenes from the horrific life of the ocean: a glittering, electrifying night city, a crowd of happy and carefree people, a table at the restaurant with unlikely bottles and packs of Winston. His memory is unlocked through the phonetic mimicry of the few words in Russian that he repeats. In this way, the hero's true self, who has barely turned into a zombie, bursts into the depths of consciousness.

The story The Day of the Bulldozer is constructed from fragments of a Soviet myth, anecdote and a spy novel, edited in accordance with a non-cinematic principle of still photography: close-ups prevail, episodes are fast-moving and descriptions are driven by zooming in and out.

The script's editing fixes the events that take place in the present time of narration and presents an interrupted video sequence of realistic depictions of the life of Uran Bator and "visions" of the hero-character. Pelevin's "surrealism" is of the highest degree logical and rational, using it as a constructive device: to bend the mirror (the traditional emblem of anthiutopia) so that one sees the distorted but recognizable features and contours of reality, unnoticed before due to the inertia or "zombification" of the totalitarian consciousness. However, Pelevin's story does not fit into the parameters of the satirical grotesque; it does not contain satirical pathos, but some other – "strange" overtones are audible.
