= Sleep (short story) =

1991 short story by Victor Pelevin

- Short story by Victor Pelevin
- Country: Russia
- Language: Russian

Publication
- Publication date: 1991

"Sleep" (Russian: «Спи») is a short story by Victor Pelevin, published in 1991. It was translated into English by Andrew Bromfield in 1998.

== Plot ==
The story is entirely devoted to the problem of dream-reality. The main character, Nikita, a student with the surname Sonechkin (literally translated from Russian as Sleeper), suddenly realizes that for most of his life he has not been fully aware of himself and the world around him. He "lives in a half-dream" in which there is no room for difficulties, but only a quiet existence. Nikita does not think about the goals of his actions, the motives for his actions, just like everyone around him: friends, parents, passersby-all immersed in a dream. This postmodern chronotope, based on the "junctions between realities," allows the author to consider the problem of power over the human consciousness, because the people around us, ordinary everyday people, sleep peacefully while the authorities do whatever they want.

== Analysis ==
Sleep in Pelevin's story has certain gradations (steps and degrees): "night" and "day," "death" and "wonder," and so on.

The author's mastery of the characters' transition to the beginning of life in the "collective-unconscious" mode occurs gradually and in stages in the story. Based on the text, we can conclude that this process is individual and can begin at different times and under different circumstances: in the family in kindergarten, at school, or belatedly, in high school, as it happens to the main character of the story.

The author conveys the metaphor of transition through the dream state. The protagonist becoming part of society and submitting to its laws, gradually realizes that being in a state of sleep is more comfortable and psychologically easier. At the initial stage, he still worries that the moment may come when he ceases to understand where the dream and reality are. However, at the end of the story, he throws away the pin that he used at the beginning of the story in order to get out of the dream state when necessary.

According to Pelevin, an important lever of influence on the personality in the "outer world," in society, is "emphilosophy," i.e., the Marxist–Leninist doctrine and principles of communist (collective-conscious) coexistence, then, according to the writer, the television, "the blue window to the universe," becomes a means to influence the human consciousness within the home and family.

In order to recreate the atmosphere of the Soviet era, Pelevin introduces into his stories a large number of typical, recurring situations for that time. A striking example of the Soviet scenario, the subject of jokes, but also a kind of symbol of the time is the queue. In the text of the story there is a "slow line" for seaweed. It is known that at the time seaweed was one of the cheapest products. But in the story, even for a product that is not in short supply, a line forms.

The story begins in the era of Brezhnev's stagnation, when the course of Marxist–Leninist philosophy was taught in all universities of the USSR. The final temporal boundary of the story is the mention of Boris Yeltsin.

The key theme of sleep in the story is revealed in different ways. The rich literary and philosophical tradition refers the reader to the interpretation of sleep as a human life in captivity of illusions. Each character in the story, as Nikita guesses, exists in his own dream, and the content of this dream remains a mystery to others, as well as the true, objective reality beyond the dream is fundamentally unrecognizable. On the other hand, the dream becomes a metaphor for the ideologically passive state of the citizen in Soviet society and, more broadly, in the world in general.
