= Árni Bergmann =

Icelandic writer and literary translator

- Born: August 22, 1935 (age 91); Keflavík, Iceland
- Education: MA, University of Moscow, 1962
- Occupations: Novelist; literary translator; editor; literary critic; teacher
- Spouse: Lena Bergmann
- Writing career
- Language: Icelandic, Russian
- Subjects: Icelandic culture, Russian and Soviet literature
- Notable work: Þorvaldur víðförli: Skáldsaga
- Notable awards: Knight's Cross of the Order of the Falcon; Order of Friendship

Árni Jóhannsson Bergmann (born 22 August 1935) is an Icelandic writer, newspaper editor, literary critic, and translator of Russian literary works.

== Career ==
Bergmann studied Russian at Moscow State University and received his Master of Arts from the institution in 1962. Shortly thereafter, he joined the staff of the Socialist-leaning Icelandic newspaper Þjóðviljinn as a journalist and columnist. He became the paper’s foremost literary critic and served as editor-in-chief during 1978 to 1992.

In addition to his work with Þjóðviljinn, Bergmann taught classes in literature, literary history, and various topics in Russian literature and language at the University of Iceland from 1973 until 2004.

He is best known for his third novel, Þorvaldur víðförli: Skáldsaga ('Thorvald Widely-Travelled: A Novel'), a fictionalized account of the life of tenth century Icelandic skald and missionary Þorvaldur víðförli, which was published in 1994. The novel earned him nomination for the Icelandic Literary Prize in 1994 and the Nordic Council Literature Prize in 1998. In 2015, he published a Russian translation of Þorvaldur víðförli

One of Iceland’s most prolific literary translators, he has translated a broad variety of works from Russian to Icelandic. Most of his translations are focused on works from the late nineteenth and first half of the twentieth century and include, for example, novels by Nina Berberova and Valentin Katayev; short stories by Anton Chekhov, Nikolai Gogol, Daniil Kharms, and Mikhail Sholokhov; poems by Osip Mandelstam, Vladimir Mayakovsky, and Boris Pasternak; and essays by Ilya Ehrenburg and Viktor Shklovsky, among many others.

== Personal life ==
Bergmann was born in Keflavík, an Icelandic town southwest of Reykjavík, on 22 August 1935 to Jóhann Stefánsson Bergmann (1906–1996), a fisherman and driver, and Halldóra Árnadóttir (1914–2006), a housewife. He is the second eldest of four brothers, the others being Hörður, born in 1933; Stefán, born in 1942; and Jóhann, born in 1946.

His wife was Lena Bergmann (1935–2008), born Elena Rytsjardovna Túvína in Ryazan, Russian SFSR, Soviet Union, the eldest child of Soffía (née Mishon), a dentist, and Ryszard Tuwim, an engineer. Lena and Árni met while both were studying Russian at the Moscow State University and were married in the fall of 1958. Their first child, Snorri, was born in 1961, when they were still living in Moscow. The young family moved to Iceland in 1962. Their second child, Olga Soffía, was born in 1967. Together, Árni and Lena wrote Blátt og rautt: bernska og unglingsár í tveim heimum ('Blue and Red: Childhood and Adolescence in Two Worlds'), contrasting their experiences growing up in Iceland and the Soviet Union, respectively.

Bergmann has never taken a drivers test and bicycling has been his primary means of transportation since returning to Iceland form Russia in 1962.

== Bibliography ==
This list of works written and/or translated by Árni Jóhannsson Bergmann is incomplete.

=== Fiction ===
Bergman has written four novels and two children’s books.

==== Novels ====
- Geirfuglarnir ('The Great Auks') – 1982
- Með kveðju frá Dublin ('With Greetings from Dublin') – 1984
- Þorvaldur víðförli ('Thorvald the Widely-Travelled') – 1994
- Sægreifi deyr ('Death of a Sea-Baron') – 1999

==== Children’s books ====
- Stelpan sem var hrædd við dýr ('The Girl Who Was Afraid of Animals') – 1994, with illustrations by Olga Bergmann
- Óskastundir: saga handa börnum ('Wishing Hours: A Tale for Children') – 1997, with illustrations by Margrét Laxness

=== Non-fiction ===
- Alvara leiksins: ævisaga Gunnars Eyjólfssonar ('Acting Seriously: The Biography of Gunnar Eyjólfsson') – 2010

==== Memoirs ====
- Miðvikudagar í Moskvu ('Wednesdays in Moscow') – 1979
- Blátt og rautt: bernska og unglingsár í tveim heimum ('Blue and Red: Childhood and Adolescence in Two Worlds') – 1986, with Lena Bergmann
- Eitt á ég samt: endurminningar ('I Still Have One Thing: Memories') – 2015

==== Scholarly works ====
- Listin að lesa ('The Art of Reading') – 2005
- Glíman við Guð ('Wresting with God') – 2008

=== Translations to Icelandic ===
==== Novels ====
- Undirleikarinn (1990) – The Accompanist by Nina Berberova
- Svarta meinið (1991) – The Black Malady by Nina Berberova
- Áfram Tími! (1998) – Time, Forward! by Valentin Katayev
- Ríkisráðið (2001) – The State Counsellor by Boris Akunin
- Krýningarhátíðin: eða síðasti Romanovinn (2003) – Coronation, or the last of the Romanovs by Boris Akunin
- Vetrardrottningin eða Fyrsta mál Fandorins – The Winter Queen, or Fandorin's First Case by Boris Akunin
- Leviatan: morðingi um borð (2005) – Murder on the Leviathan by Boris Akunin

==== Plays ====
- Sjálfsmorðinginn (1996) – The Suicide by Nikolai Erdmann
- Stjörnur á morgunhimni (1999) – Stars in the Morning Sky by Alexander Galin
- Sumargestir (1989) – Summerfolk by Maxim Gorky

==== Short stories ====
- Sonur Shibaloks (1987) – "Shibalok's Seed" from Tales from the Don by Mikhail Sholokhov
- Úr Hjarðljóðum á 20stu öld ('Poems Heard in the 20th Century') (1987) – by Andrei Bitov
- Um ástina (1994) – "About Love" by Anton Chekhov
- Vinningsmiðinn (1994) – "The Lottery Ticket” by Anton Chekhov
- Konan með hundinn og fleiri sögur (1998) – "The Lady with the Dog" and other short stories by Anton Chekhov
- Daníil Kharms: Lykt af brenndum fjöðrum ('Daniil Kharms: Smell of Burnt Feathers') (2000) – selected short stories by Daniil Kharms, published as a special edition (sérrit) of the literary journal Bjartur og frú Emilía
- Mírgorod (2006) by Nikolai Gogol, translated by Árni Bergmann, Áslaug Agnarsdóttir, and Þórarinn Kristjánsson

==== Other ====
- Þörf greinargerð (1957) – essay by Ilya Ehrenburg
- Kaffihúsið Rotonde: Kaflar úr fyrstu bók endurminninga ('Café Rotonde: Chapters from the first book of memoirs') (1961) – selections from the memoirs of Ilya Ehrenburg
- Mennirnir, árin, lífið (1961) – selected passages from People, Years, Life by Ilya Ehrenburg
- Bréfið ('Letters') (1987) – selected works by Isaac Babel
- Fullum hálsi (1987) – by Vladimir Mayakovsky
- Í öllu… (1987) – by Boris Pasternak
- Til M. Rashins (1987) – poem by Yevgeny Yevtushenko
- [Ljóð án titils] ('[Untitled]') (1987) – poem by Osip Mandelstam
- Rússland og Ísland: Úr sögu samskipta rétttrúaðra og lútherskra ('Russia and Iceland: The Relationship Between Orthodoxy and Lutheranism through History') (1988) – essay by Ágústin Niktin, published in Kirkjuritið, the magazine of the Church of Iceland
- Listin sem tækni (1991) – essay 'Art as Device' by Viktor Shklovsky, published in Spor í bókmenntafræði 20. aldar ('Steps in 20th Century Literature'), a collection of ten translated essays from various landmark writers of the late 19th and early 20th century
- Freistarinn (1994) – by Anton Chekhov
- Ígorskviða: rússneskt hetjukvæði og forníslenskar bókmenntir (1997) – translation of the epic poem The Tale of Igor's Campaign from Old East Slavic and accompanying text drawing parallels between 'Russian epic poetry and Icelandic ancient literature'
- Rússneskur fútúrismi ('Russian Futurism') (2001) – collected manifestos of Russian Futurists
- Rússa sögur ('Russian Stories') (2009) – selected passages from the Chronicle of Bygone Years and other Old Russian letopises

== See also ==
- List of Icelandic writers
- Icelandic literature
