= The Death of Achilles =

1998 novel by Boris Akunin

- Recent Russian language edition
- Author: Boris Akunin
- Original title: Смерть Ахиллеса
- Translator: Andrew Bromfield
- Language: Russian
- Series: Erast Fandorin
- Genre: Historical detective
- Publisher: Zakharov (Russia), Random House (U.S.)
- Publication date: 1998 (Russia), 2005 (U.S.)
- Publication place: Russia
- Media type: Print (Hardback & Paperback)
- ISBN: 0-7538-2097-8
- OCLC: 67872058
- Preceded by: Murder on the Leviathan
- Followed by: Special Assignments

The Death of Achilles (Russian: Смерть Ахиллеса) is the fourth novel in the Erast Fandorin historical detective series by Russian writer Boris Akunin. Its subtitle is детектив о наемном убийце ("a detective novel about a murderer-for-hire"). It was originally published in Russian in 1998; the English translation was released in 2006.

== Plot ==
Moscow, 1882. When Fandorin returns from Japan with his manservant Masa, he enters into the service of Moscow governor Prince Dolgorukoi. Later that day, the General Mikhail Sobolev, nicknamed the Russian Achilles and an old friend of Fandorin's, is found dead in the same hotel. Officially, he died of a heart attack, but Fandorin becomes suspicious when he talks with the bodyguards of the general. Fandorin had befriended these cossacks when he rooted out a Turkish spy during the siege of Plevna (see The Turkish Gambit). But the same cossacks now treat him with hostility.

Fandorin finds out the reason for their hostility as he discovers that the general had not really died in the hotel, but was moved there from the apartment of his mistress. Found dead in a compromising situation, the cossacks tried to prevent a scandal and protect the reputation of the general. But Fandorin looks even deeper and finds out that a large sum of money is missing. He learns that Sobolev is trying to raise funds to begin a political campaign, and Fandorin begins to suspect foul play. He finds that the general has been poisoned in a very clever manner, and the killer anticipated the cover up, which would ensure his safe getaway. Fandorin further discovers that the plot leads up to the highest levels of the Tsar's government, and that he himself is now viewed as an enemy of the state for his efforts to catch the killer.

The killer is Achimas Welde, a formidable hired assassin, who has only failed three times in his career. One of those times was his assignment to kill Fandorin, when he just managed to kill Fandorin's wife, as Fandorin himself was chasing him (see The Winter Queen). The second half of the novel is told from Achimas' point of view and recounts his life story, up to the plot to kill Sobolev and the investigation. By chance, Achimas discovers that the man who hired him to kill Sobolev was Grand Duke Kirill Alexandrovich, the younger brother of Tsar Alexander III. Apparently, the royal court came to perceive Sobolev as dangerous due to his Napoleonic ambitions, while his immense popularity among the people makes an open trial impossible. In the concluding chapters of the novel, Fandorin kills Achimas, and prepares to flee Moscow (believing himself to be a target of the plotters), but Prince Dolgorukoi's assistant meets him at the train station and tells him that everything has been covered up and he can continue in the service of the state.

== Structure ==
The Death of Achilles is unusual in the sense that the story is told twice; halfway through, the point of view switches from Fandorin to his antagonist, and the latter's life history is told. When the two stories reach the same time, they merge in two final, concluding chapters. This is highly reminiscent of some of Arthur Conan Doyle's Sherlock Holmes novels, such as A Study in Scarlet and The Valley of Fear. The first half of The Death of Achilles is also the first Fandorin story since The Winter Queen to be told from Fandorin's point of view.

The earlier career of the assassin Achimas Welde includes a confrontation with a rival assassin nicknamed "The Jackal", who intended to assassinate the King of Italy. This is a clear reference to the well-known thriller The Day of the Jackal, where an assassin of the same nickname comes close to assassinating Charles de Gaulle. Welde's career also includes an episode touching on a Belgian paedophile serial killer, reminiscent of the real-life such affair in Belgium a century later than the time in which the book is set.

== Historical context ==
The figure of general Sobolev was based upon General Mikhail Skobelev. Skobelev died suddenly of a heart attack in 1882 under the circumstances similar to such as described in the novel (during a meeting with a prostitute). The press reports regarding his demise was heavily censored which gave rise to many conspiracy theories, some implicating the Tsar Alexander III himself.

The governor of Moscow, Prince Dolgorukoi, is based on Prince Vladimir Andreevich Dolgoroukov, the Governor General of Moscow in 1865- 1891. Grand Duke Kirill Alexandrovich, the Tsar's brother, apparently is a fictionalized version of Alexander III's real younger brother, Vladimir Alexandrovich.

== Allusions to the Iliad and other Greek myths ==
As the title of the novel suggests, The Death of Achilles alludes to one of the main characters of the Iliad. However, the allusion is more complex than just the mere reference to general Sobolev's nickname, the Russian Achilles. In fact, the "true" Achilles referred to in the title is the killer, Achimas Welde. The second part of the novel, which recounts the expert assassin's life story, is a cleverly disguised retelling of the Iliad and other Greek myths relating to the life of Achilles. Some clues are scattered within the novel for the informed reader to decipher, such as the following:

- The name Achimas, of course, is similar to Achilles;
- Achimas' father is named Pelef, which is similar to Achilles' father Peleus;
- Achimas' mother is named Fatima, which is similar to Achilles' mother Thetis (pronounced Fetida in Russian);
- Fatima, unbeknownst to Pelef, teaches Achimas to defend himself. This is similar to Thetis' attempt to make Achilles immortal by dipping him in the Styx, also unbeknownst to Peleus;
- Achimas is adopted by his uncle Chasan, a mountain dweller, who teaches him the way of his people. The young Achilles was taught by a centaur named Chiron, who also lived in the mountains;
- The young Achimas hides in a monastery orphanage, dressed as a girl. The orphanage is located in a city called Skirovsk. The young Achilles hid, also dressed as a girl, at the court of Lycomedes, the king of Skyros;
- The way Chasan finds Achimas out is by trickery: he leaves his sword in the same room as women's jewelry and then secretly observes Achimas pick up the sword. Exactly the same thing happens to Achilles on Skyros;
- Achimas participates in an operation (the robbery of Medvedev’s vault), which results in Evgenia being sacrificed. Achilles participates in an operation (the Trojan War) during which Iphigenia is sacrificed;
- Evgenia's sacrifice is the result of her belief that Achimas loves her. Iphigenia is being told that she will marry Achilles;
- Evgenia's husband is named Medvedev, a common Russian name derived from medved (bear). He mistakenly kills his wife while trying to protect his house. According to one version of the Greek myth, Iphigenia was saved from the sacrifice by a bear;
- In his schoolboy days Achimas had killed the bully Kikin and the schoolmaster Tenetov. Achilles kills Trojan heroes Cycnus (Kikn in Russian) and Tenes;
- Both Achimas and Achilles kill a famous general. Sobolev is a great patriotic hero of Russia, much the same as Hector was for Troy;
- Achimas kills Sobolev in such a way as to make the death appear shameful. Achilles wasn't as crafty but took many pains to mutilate and befoul Hector’s body;
- Achimas dies near the Swedish Gates (Sveiskie vorota in Russian). Achilles dies near the Scaean Gates (Skeiskie vorota in Russian);
- The Swedish Gates are near an inn called Trinity (Troitsa in Russian). The Scaean Gates lead into Troy (Troya in Russian);
- The bane of both Achimas and Achilles is an arrow, which strikes them in the heel. Neither Achimas nor Achilles were ever wounded prior to this.

The novel's title, therefore, has a double meaning. The real death of Achilles it refers to occurs not at the beginning but in the end of the book. Sobolev's role in the novel, in spite of his nickname, is that of Hector, Achilles' victim. A funeral speech delivered by the Grand Duke midway through the novel, in which he directly compares Sobolev to Hector, offers a more direct clue. This is one of the more complex and broad allusions to famous works of literature which are quite numerous in all Akunin's novels.
