= Nothing Sacred =

Nothing Sacred or Nothing's Sacred may refer to:

== Film and television ==
- Nothing Sacred (film), a 1937 American screwball comedy
- Nothing Sacred (TV series), a 1997–1998 American drama series
- "Nothing Sacred" (Murder City), a 2004 television episode

== Literature ==
- Nothing Sacred (novel), a 2010 novel by Boris Akunin
- Nothing Sacred (play), a 1988 play by George F. Walker adapted for a 1998 Canadian television film
- Nothing Sacred, a 2004 science fiction novel by Tom Flynn
- Nothing Sacred: The Truth About Judaism, a 2003 book by Douglas Rushkoff
- Nothing's Sacred (book), a 2005 autobiography by Lewis Black

== Music ==
- Nothing Sacred (band), a 1980s heavy metal group
- Nothing Sacred (album), by David Allan Coe, 1978
- Nothing's Sacred (album), by Lȧȧz Rockit, 1991
- Nothing Sacred, an album by Babylon A.D., 1992
- "Nothing Sacred – A Song for Kirsty", a song by Russell Watson, 2002
- "Nothing Sacred", a song by Memento from Beginnings, 2003
- "Nothing's Sacred", a song by London After Midnight from Violent Acts of Beauty, 2007

== See also ==
- Is Nothing Sacred?, a 1983 album by the Lords of the New Church
- "Is Nothing Sacred", a 1999 song by Meat Loaf
