= Let the Thunder of Victory Rumble! =

Let the Thunder of Victory Rumble! may refer to:

- Let the Thunder of Victory Rumble! (anthem), a historical anthem of the Russian Empire
- Let the Thunder of Victory Rumble! (novel), a novel by Boris Akunin
