= Children of the Moon =

2008 novel by Boris Akunin

- Author: Boris Akunin
- Original title: Дети Луны
- Language: Russian
- Series: Brüderschaft with Death
- Genre: Historical detective
- Publication date: 2008
- Publication place: Russia
- Preceded by: The Flying Elephant
- Followed by: The Wandering Man

Children of the Moon (Russian: Дети Луны, romanized: Deti Luny) is a novel by Boris Akunin, the second part of the second book on the adventures of Russian and German spies during the First World War. It describes the adventures of Aleksei Romanov in St. Petersburg in the autumn of 1915.

== Plot ==
...The autumn of 1915. After the successful completion of the operation in Switzerland (The Torment of a Broken Heart), Aleksei Romanov finally decided to link his life with counterintelligence. He attends special military courses and begins to study the difficult art of identifying foreign spies. In the midst of his studies, Romanov, now an ensign, receives a new important task from General Zhukovsky and Duke Kozlovsky, the immediate boss of Aleksei.

... Colonel Shakhov, who works in the Main Artillery Directorate, learns that his daughter Alina covertly takes pictures of secret documents. Alina is a sick drug addict, and Shakhov thinks that when trying to get another portion of morphine, she started working for German intelligence. Despite his paternal feelings, Shakhov nevertheless reports this fact to counterintelligence, and General Zhukovsky decides to organize the seizure of a German spy during his meeting with Alina.

Alina often visits the club "Children of the Moon", where young people gather, entranced with decadence. Assuming that the transfer of information takes place there, Duke Kozlovsky suggests that Romanov dresses as one of the guests of the club and follows Alina Shakhova. Beautiful, but dying from drugs Alina causes an acute sense of pity in Romanov, and then affection. Aleksei tries to penetrate into her secret, but the truth in this case is incredibly terrible...

== Interesting Facts ==
- "Poet Selen", speaking at the club "Children of the Moon" - this is the famous Russian poet of the "Silver Age of Russian Poetry" Vladislav Khodasevich.
