= Maria Maria (disambiguation) =

"Maria Maria" is a 1999 song by Santana.

Maria Maria may also refer to:

- María María, a Venezuelan TV series
- Maria, Maria..., a novel by Boris Akunin
- Maria Entraigues, an Argentine-American singer, composer, and actress known as Maria Maria
