= F.M. (novel) =

2006 novel in two volumes by Boris Akunin

- Author: Boris Akunin
- Original title: Ф.М.
- Language: Russian
- Genre: Novel
- Publication date: 2006
- Publication place: Russia
- Media type: Print

F.M. (Russian: Ф.М., the initials of Fyodor Mikhailovich Dostoevsky and also probably a pun on FM radio) is a novel in two volumes by Boris Akunin, which reached bookstores in Russia on 20 May 2006.

This work presents a postmodern engagement with Dostoevsky's Crime and Punishment. The main character of the book is Nicholas Fandorin, the grandchild of the famous sleuth Erast Fandorin, who seeks the lost variant of Crime and Punishment in modern-day Russia. Another character is Porfiry Petrovich, the detective in Crime and Punishment, from whose perspective the story is told. Thus, the story is relayed through two distinct temporal perspectives: 21st century and 19th century. All the characters from Dostoevsky's work have counterparts in the more recent time.

The book was published in Russian in 350,000 copies.

According to Akunin, this work was inspired by a song about Dostoevsky written by Boris Grebenshchikov.
