= The Turkish Gambit (film) =

- Russian movie poster
- Directed by: Dzhanik Fayziev
- Screenplay by: Boris Akunin; Dzhanik Fayziev
- Produced by: Leonid Vereshchagin; Anatoly Maximov; Konstantin Ernst
- Starring: Egor Beroev; Olga Krasko; Alexander Lykov
- Music by: Vsevolod Saksonov; Andrei Feofanov
- Production company: Studio TriTe
- Release date: 2005
- Running time: 132 minutes
- Countries: Russia; Bulgaria
- Languages: Russian; Bulgarian; Turkish; Romanian; English; French
- Budget: $3.5 million
- Box office: $18,461,000

The Turkish Gambit is a 2005 Russian historical spy film, an adaptation of Boris Akunin's novel The Turkish Gambit featuring his most famous character, the detective Erast Fandorin. It was directed by Dzhanik Fayziev and written by Akunin himself. The film starred Marat Basharov, Yegor Beroyev, and Olga Krasko. The Turkish Gambit was a box office success, although it received mixed reviews from critics.

== Plot ==
The film takes place in Bulgaria during the Russo-Turkish War (1877–1878). Erast Fandorin is put on the trail of a Turkish agent who is trying to disrupt the Russian advance during the Siege of Plevna. The agent, known as Anwar Efendi, is a master of disguise and has excellent command of Russian.

=== Filming ===
Didier Bienaimé died the day before his arrival in Russia to voice his role. Director Janik Fayziev decided to leave the actor's speech in French in the film, voicing only some of the lines himself.

«Дождик осенний» ("Autumn Rain", music by Isaac Schwartz, lyrics by Bulat Okudzhava, vocals by Olga Krasko) was written for the movie "Captain Fracasse" (1984), it was also performed in the TV series "Happy New Year!" (1999).

=== Change from the book ===
Unlike the ending of the book, where French correspondent d'Hervais is exposed as being Anwar in disguise, in the film Anwar turns out to have been posing as a seemingly awkward and stupid Russian captain.

In the book, unlike the film, Fandorin did not escape by clinging to the underbelly of a carriage but was actually released by the governor of Viddin Yusuf Pasha after winning a wager.

The scene where Varvara and Fandorin flew in the balloon never took place in the book and Varvara had no role in discovering the weaknesses of the Turkish defenses.

The scene in the cave with the Lieutenant Luntz did not take place in the book. The character of the homosexual Luntz was created for the movie. The homosexual nature of Kazanzaki is never alluded to in the film. In fact, Fandorin was never once shot at by Anwar Effendi in the book.

In the book, the evidence for Colonel Lukan's involvement in treason was found on him and not in his tent like in the film.

Colonel Lukan was killed in a duel whereby sabres were used rather than pistols.

The book refers to three main failed assaults on Plevna. The film shows only two.

In the book, when Fandorin hears about Osman Pasha's plans to 'surrender' he rushes to Sobolev to urge him to attack Plevna and not to the meeting point of the Turkish 'envoys'.

In the film Fandorin went to Istanbul and showed up at the end in Turkish attire. In the book he never went to Istanbul and arrived wearing European clothing.

In the film Fandorin was happy to see his old friend Count Zurov when Zurov first arrived, whereas in the book the Zurov and Fandorin were not close friends and the first meeting in the tent was rather chilly.

== Cast ==
- Egor Beroev as Erast Fandorin
- Olga Krasko as Varvara Suvorova
- Marat Basharov as Gridnev
- Vladimir Ilyin as General Mizinov (based on Nikolay Mezentsov)
- Dmitry Pevtsov as Zurov
- Viktor Verzhbitsky as Lukan
- Aleksandr Baluev as General Sobolev (based on Mikhail Skobelev)
- Aleksey Guskov as Kazanzaki
- Gosha Kutsenko as Ismail-Bey
- Andrey Krasko as Officer
- Leonid Kuravlyov as Retired Major
- Yevgeni Lazarev as Tsar Alexander II
- Didier Bienaimé as D'Hevrais
- Viktor Bychkov
- Sergey Gazarov as Yūsuf Pasha, governor of Vidin
- Aleksandr Lykov as Perepyolkin (based on Aleksey Kuropatkin)
- Anatoly Kuznetsov
- Andrey Rudensky
- Valdis Pelsh
- Daniel Olbrychski as McLaughlin (based on Januarius MacGahan)
- Miki Iliev
- Raicho Vasilev as Bodyguard
- Aleksandr Aleksandrov as Secret agent
- Daniel Rashev

== Anachronisms ==
In the opening scene, in the background, a Turkish man says a prayer in Turkish. He says "Long live the Turkish republic", when the Turkish Republic would only be established in 1922, many decades after the time in which the film is set.
