= The Infant and the Devil =

2007 novel by Boris Akunin

- Author: Boris Akunin
- Original title: Младенец и чёрт
- Language: Russian
- Series: Brüderschaft with Death
- Genre: Historical detective
- Publication date: 2007
- Publication place: Russia
- Followed by: The Torment of a Broken Heart

The Infant and the Devil (Russian: Младенец и чёрт, romanized: Mladenets i chort) is a novel by Boris Akunin, the first part of the first book on the adventures of Russian and German spies during the First World War. In this book the reader first gets to know the two main characters of this literary series - the Russian student Aleksei Romanov and the German super-spy Josef von Theofels. Theofels is a pun on the German word Teufel which translates directly to devil.

== Plot ==
In June 1914, Europe is moving towards a big war following the assassination of Archduke Franz Ferdinand of Austria in Sarajevo. One of the minor officials in the Guards Corps of the Russian Army has made copies of the mobilization plan of the forthcoming war and offers them to the German intelligence service. The main spy of Germany in Russia, Captain Joseph (Sepp) von Theofels, participates in the operation of transferring the document. During the meeting with the traitor, Sepp is ambushed, however thanks to the accidental intervention of a young man, student Aleksei Parisovich Romanov, he manages to escape. Russian counterintelligence begins the hunt for Sepp but he always manages to slip away with his faithful servant and assistant Timo.

In counterintelligence, Romanov is interrogated by Captain Duke Kozlovsky, who explains the outcome of Romanov's actions. Realizing his guilt, albeit accidental, Romanov is full of desire to atone. Russian counterintelligence manages to learn that a copy of the plan is hidden in the premises of the sports club of the Guards Corps, the site of a football match between the Guards and German football players. Assuming that during the match the spy will try to get the invaluable plan from the cache, Kozlovsky wants to organize an ambush. Aleksei Romanov disguises himself as a football player in the Russian Guards team and tries to teach Kozlovsky to become a goalkeeper.
