= Azazel (miniseries) =

- Written by: Boris Akunin
- Directed by: Aleksandr Adabashyan
- Starring: Ilya Noskov; Kirill Pirogov; Sergej Bezrukov; Oleg Basilashvili; Marina Neelova; Ewa Szykulska
- Music by: Vladimir Dashkevich
- Country of origin: Russia
- Original language: Russian

Production
- Cinematography: Mikhail Agranovich
- Running time: 204 minutes

Original release
- Release: 2002

Azazel (Russian: Азазель) is a Russian made for TV adaptation of Boris Akunin's introductory 'Erast Fandorin' novel The Winter Queen.

== Plot summary ==
This historical detective story features a young police inspector, Erast Fandorin. Fandorin's adventures take place in the Russian Empire of the late 19th century, and he regularly finds himself at the center of key historical events, including development of Masonic and Revolutionary movements.

The Hero is a young man who has recently joined the police force in the 1870s. The setting reflects a period without forensic science, marked by a grid social structure and formal proprieties, where investigations often relied on the intuition of amateurs or newcomers. Fandorin is portrayed as inexperienced and naive, with his family fortune lost, yet he remains cultured, intelligent, diligent and highly enthusiastic. He doesn't so much want to impress as want to succeed ... by a process of blind self-confidence and a youthful self-delusion that he is acting logically and scientifically. Fandorin is invited to investigate the suicide of a rich student. The young man has shot himself in public, but something seems strange about the suicide. Fandorin quickly exposes the murderous intrigue which has led to the death ... and opens up a can of worms which will have him crossing Europe in search of a mastermind ... or maybe even the godfathers behind a terrorist plot.

== Cast ==
- Ilya Noskov as Erast Petrovich Fandorin
- Sergey Bezrukov as Ivan Franzevich Brilling
- Marina Aleksandrova as Elizaveta von Evert-Kolokoltseva
- Oleg Basilashvili as General Mizinov
- Sergei Chonishvili as Ippolit Alexandrovich Zurov
- Marina Neyolova as Lady Esther
- Yuri Avsharov as Georg
- Felix Antipov as Xavery Feofilaktovich Grushin
- Larisa Borushko as Amalia Kazimirovna Bezhetskaya
- Dmitry Burkhankin as Kokorin
- Valentin Golubenko as Klaus
- Yevgeni Grishkovetz as Achimas Velde

== Remake ==
=== English-language version ===
Dutch film director Paul Verhoeven was set to film an English-language theatrical film remake of Azazel, titled "The Winter Queen", with Dan Stevens set to star as Fandorin and the leading female role to be played by Milla Jovovich. This movie was cancelled.

=== New Russian Version ===
In August 2022, Plus Studios has announces the completion of the filming of the new Azazel adaptation based on the bestseller by Boris Akunin. An aspiring detective lives in an alternative year of 2023, with modern technology and robotics helping him investigate. At the same time, Russia is still a monarchical system, since the only revolution that the country has experienced is technological. It was premiered on Kinopoisk HD streaming service in January 2023.

According to the sources, the official synopsis is that The October revolution did not take place, the Bolsheviks did not come to power, and Czar Nicholas III (played by Maksim Matveev) shares the government of the country with the progressive Prime Minister Dmitry Orlov (Evgeniy Stychkin). At this time, 20-year-old Erast Fandorin begins his career in the detective police department. Being engaged in not the most interesting work, he learns strange news: the owner of an oil pipeline company, a young millionaire, shoots himself in the temple in the center of Petrograd in front of dozens of people. Suicide falls on the camera recording of the police robot. Fandorin suspects that the case is more complicated than it seems, and takes on his first serious investigation.

The showrunner of the project is Alexandra Remizova (who worked on “Trigger”, “Patient Zero”), the director is Nurbek Egen (“Alibi”, “Sherlock in Russia”). The series also stars Mila Ershova, Alexander Semchev, Milena Radulovich (from "Balkan Frontier"), Artem Bystrov, Grigory Vernik. Erast Fandorin was played by Vladislav Tiron .
