= The Wandering Man (Akunin) =

2009 novel by Boris Akunin

- Author: Boris Akunin
- Original title: Странный человек
- Language: Russian
- Series: Brüderschaft with Death
- Genre: Historical detective
- Publication date: 2009
- Publication place: Russia
- Preceded by: Children of the Moon
- Followed by: Let the Thunder of Victory Rumble!

The Wandering Man (Russian: Странный человек, romanized: Strannyj chelovek) is a novel by Boris Akunin, the first part of the third book on the adventures of Russian and German spies during the First World War. It describes the dangerous adventures of Josef von Theofels in St. Petersburg in early 1916.

== Plot ==
The story is set in the winter of 1916. During the previous year, all the power of the German army was directed against Russia. After several crushing defeats, Russia lost about 2 million soldiers and many thousands of square kilometers of its territory. However, Germany failed in its main goal of 1915 - to force the Russian Empire out of the war. One of the most important episodes of the war in the East in 1915 was the German army's attempt to break through the Russian Northern Front, which ended in complete failure and with great losses because the German command was fed deceptive information. The author of this brilliant operation was General Vladimir Zhukovsky.

Realizing that Zhukovsky's talent may cause a lot of damage to Germany in the future, the German intelligence chief and his deputy order their best spy, Josef von Theofels (known as "Sepp"), to carry out the operation against the Russian general. The intention is to have Zhukovsky accused of taking bribes and to get him fired from his post as chief of Russian counterintelligence. Under the guise of the "Siberian industrialist" Emelyan Bazarov, Teofels penetrates into St. Petersburg. Using an acquaintance with Princess Vereiskaya, with whom Bazarov allegedly escaped from German captivity, he meets Zhukovsky, but the general's discernment and caution prevent the German spy from carrying out the intended provocation. Enraged, Theofels decides to make use of an unusual trump card in the fight against General Zhukovsky – the Wandering Man, or the Wanderer. This is a mysterious figure who is alternately considered a saint or a devil, who may be of use to Sepp in a new, cunning plan.

== Historical basis ==
The prototypes of real historical figures operate in the story. The main figure, Wanderer - is one of the most mysterious personalities during the last years of the Russian Empire – Grigori Rasputin. The faithful fan of the Wanderer "Fanny Zarubina" (who is derisively called "The Cow") is Anna Vyrubova, the lady-in-waiting, the closest and most devoted friend of the last Russian Empress Alexandra Feodorovna.

The "Deputy of the State Duma Zaitsevich" is Vladimir Purishkevich, a Russian politician of the ultra-right wing, a monarchist, a deputy of the State Duma of Russia. In reality, Purishkevich ("deputy Zaitsevich") died completely differently than described in the story. Purishkevich died in 1920 in Novorossiysk from typhus.

The prototype of General Vladimir Zhukovsky is General Vladimir Dzhunkovsky. August 19, 1915 Dzhunkovsky during the report, Nicholas II tried to uncover the pernicious influence of Grigory Rasputin, citing numerous facts of riots committed by Rasputin. The Emperor did not want to hear anything - Djunkovsky was dismissed from the post of Deputy Minister of Internal Affairs and sent to the front.
