= She Lover of Death =

2009 novel by Boris Akunin

- Russian edition
- Author: Boris Akunin
- Original title: Любовница смерти
- Language: Russian
- Series: Erast Fandorin
- Genre: Historical detective
- Publication place: Russia
- Media type: Print (Hardback and Paperback)
- Preceded by: The Coronation
- Followed by: He Lover of Death

She Lover of Death is a historical detective novel by Russian author Boris Akunin. The book is the eighth featuring the fictional character Erast Fandorin.

== Plot ==
A naive young woman, Masha Mironova, travels from provincial Russia to Moscow, where she changes her name to Columbine and joins the Lovers of Death, a small group of bohemian poets, each of them eagerly waiting their turn to die a romantic fin de siècle death by suicide. Once one member dies, their replacement is found by the leader of the group, the Doge. Another newcomer to the society appears to be a Japanese prince, although this turns out to be Erast Fandorin acting undercover. Fandorin is not the only person to have connected the suicides and the group: a newspaper reporter, Zhemailo, has also done so and he also dies a mysterious death. A police informer, Horatio, is also part of the group. Fandorin uncovers that many of the suicides are murders, some committed by a young member known as Caliban. These turn out to be a convenient smoke-screen for the real murderer, the Doge, whose full crimes are eventually discovered after he drives Columbine into suicide, which she survives.

== Release and reception ==
She Lover of Death was published in the UK in October 2009 by Weidenfeld & Nicolson; the hardback copy was 272 pages. In September 2010 Weidenfeld & Nicolson published a paperback version of the novel in the UK, which also ran to 272 pages.

She Lover of Death achieved generally favourable reviews. Marcel Berlins, writing in The Times noted that "Akunin is not out to achieve verisimilitude. What he delivers is an absurdly imaginative story, surreal and comic. His characters are outrageous and thoroughly unbelievable. Fandorin is an impossibly heroic figure. The combination is irresistible." John Thornhill, reviewing the novel in the Financial Times thought the book to be "conventional and self-indulgently enjoyable" Thornhill considers that the story is "steeped in the classics of Russian literature", whilst he considers that Akunin "toys with the styles and conventions of Russia’s illustrious late-19th-century writers." Overall, Thornhill saw She Lover of Death to be an "artfully constructed novel [which] also nods in the direction of Arthur Conan Doyle".

The Reviewer for The Sunday Times wrote that the Fandorin was an "engagingly original series" which was "a fascinating mixture of pathos and pastiche; his characters are larger than life but never absurd." they went on to say that She Lover of Death "is as ingenious as the earlier Fandorin novels, and full of clever and unexpected twists."

Reviewing for the Australian newspaper The Courier-Mail, Cheryl Jorgensen considered that, with Akunin has a "tone throughout is light, as though he doesn't take himself too seriously and this gives the tale its appeal"; overall she considered the book to be "an absorbing tale from Imperial Russia that is sure to delight".
