= Ying and Yan =

Play written by Boris Akunin

Ying and Yan (Инь и Ян) is a play by Boris Akunin written for the director Alexey Borodin, edited by Zaharov in 2006. This play features Akunin's character, the Russian detective Erast Fandorin, along with his Japanese manservant Masahiro "Masa" Sibata and is placed shortly after Fandorin's return from Japan. The printed edition features two versions of the play, the "White Version" and the "Black Version". As Boris Akunin writes in the editorial by which the book begins, these versions have the same plot, but belong to two different worlds.

== Title ==
The title references the Yin-Yang, but it is also composed of the names of the two of main protagonists. "Инь" is the Russian transliteration of the Chinese word transliterated in English as "Yin", and similarly "Ян" is for "Yang". However the "correct" translation would miss the puns with the names of the protagonists: Inga and Ian (Yan).

== Characters ==
- Erast Fandorin, a famous detective who has just returned from Japan.
- Masa, Fandorin's Japanese manservant who owes Fandorin his life.
- Yan Boretsky, a student who dropped his studies for his researches on vaccines. He plans to marry his cousin, Inga, though he doesn't seem too enthusiastic about it.
- Inga Boretskaya, daughter of wealthy parents. She is much in love with Yan and is enthusiastic about marrying him. She called herself "Ying" when she was little and couldn't say her name correctly.
- Kazimir Boretsky, Yan's father and a desperate alcoholic.
- Stanislav Boretsky and Lidiya Boretskaya, Inga's wealthy parents.
- Robert Dickson, the deceased Sigizmund Boretsky's doctor, who couldn't keep him from dying.
- Stepan Slyunkov, the lawyer who tells the Boretsy family about Sigizmund's will.
- Faddey, the absent-minded servant of the deceased Sigizmund Boretsky.
- Arkasha, the somewhat sinister lackey. He seems to have a crush on Glasha and is jealous when the latter shows sympathy for Masa.
- Glafira (more often referred to as Glasha), a house maid.

== Background ==
The play takes place in Moscow suburbs, Russia, in the deceased Sigizmund Boretsky's manor in 1882. Sigizmund's brothers Stanislav and Kazimir came along with their families to discover his will and to divide the heritage. The weather is stormy outside. Erast Fandorin is expected to visit the family.

== Different versions ==
The white and black versions are different both in overall feeling and in details. The White Version, according to viewers, takes itself seriously, plays like a detective story, and has a typical Russian atmosphere. The Black Version, on the other hand, is more of a black comedy with mystic elements and an oriental feel.

- In the White Version, Fandorin breaks an arm. In the Black Version, he breaks a leg, thus becomes much more incapacitated.
- In the White Version, Yan is determined and mature. In the Black Version, Yan is childish and absent-minded.
- In the Black Version, Inga shows some interest in Fandorin.
- Some events are relocated. In the White Version, they take place in the attic and in the basement. In the Black Version, the same events happen in the outside buildings. This follows Fandorin's incapacity of going up and down the stairs in the Black Version.
- The Black Version has more mystical aspects, while the White Version is more realistic.
- The main villain is not the same in the two versions.

== Plot summaries ==
=== White Version ===
The play begins with Yan trying to get the white rabbit he used as a guinea pig from Inga. He tries to convince her he's on his way to discover a vaccine against tetanus, but Inga refuses to give him the rabbit. She turns the conversation to uncle Sigizmund's will and their future marriage.

When both arrive at the living room, they discover the whole family and friends in a wide range of states. Most of them seem outraged. When Slyunkov is asked to read the will again, it is revealed that all Sigizmund's money goes to Inga, Yan gets a Chinese paper fan, and the rest gets nothing. Slyunkov notices that the fan must be passed on in presence of a person called Erast Fandorin. As Slyunkov says, Mr Fandorin was expected in the morning, but somehow didn't make it to the manor yet. Arkasha admits having prepared a cart and sent a quite dumb coachman to get Fandorin. Finally, Slyunkov agrees to give the fan to Yan without further ado. While in a bad state, the item looks impressive and has its two sides of different colors: black and white. Dickson suggests Yan would sell it to a collector. Interested in the money that would make, Kazimir takes the fan and discusses a possible sale with Dickson. He asks Yan to bring him some cognac, which Yan does, and drinks it. Inga manages to get the fan away and jokingly slaps Kazimir with the fan's black side. All of a sudden, Kazimir starts shivering and drops dead.

That's where Fandrin enters the room and tells the family he had an accident because of rough roads and a not so solid cart. He is in a good shape, except of a broken arm. He is accompanied by Masa who only starts to learn Russian. The family tries to hide the corpse from him, but he finally notices it. Nevertheless, Fandorin tells the family that the fan is known to be magical. When turned white to the person and black to the world, waving it and singing an incantation eight times would make the person happy and wealthy at the expense of the rest, and vice versa if the fan is turned other way. It can also heal by slapping with its white side and kill by slapping with its black one. Having heard that, Inga remembers slapping Kazimir and faints. The electric lights go off because of the storm, and when they're on again, the fan is missing. Fandorin plans on questioning every present person, asks Dickson to autopsy the body and check the cognac for poison, then tells everybody except Yan to leave. When Kazimir's body is being pulled away, Fandorin sees a paper falling off his pocket and keeps it.

After some hesitations, Yan supposes his aunt Lidiya would be the thief, as she wants youth and wealth desperately. Then he mentions the price Dickinson said the fan was worth, and Fandorin impresses Yan by telling him the real price of the fan as an antique item. Yan decides to sell the fan after it is found to get money and go on with his researches. Meanwhile, Arkasha tries to impress Glasha with his guitar playing and singing, but Masa arrives and steals the spotlight, much to the lackey's chagrin.

Fandorin then questions Inga, and she tells him about having fallen in love with Yan (whom she fell in love with when she saw him after a long time of separation; she tells he changed a lot) and about Kazimir's disastrous situation in life. Meanwhile, an embarrassed and jealous Arkasha makes fun of Masa. Masa asks him if it was he who prepared the cart. Arkasha denies, but Glasha acknowledges. Arkasha and Masa fight, and Masa prevails.

Fandorin confronts Lidiya on Kazimir's death. He supposes there was poison in the wine and she was involved. He reminds she had an affair with Kazimir and shows her the paper he got from the deceased, in which Lidiya promises Kazimir she would never lend him money again and asks him to leave her alone. Stanislav enters the living room to discover his wife in tears and congratulates her for supposedly having poisoned Kazimir, only to blame her for the affair and lending money to Kazimir a beat later.

Masa and Glasha sit on a bench outside and talk. They are surprised by Faddey. Glasha leaves and Faddey sits on the bench and laments about his destiny as a manservant and his total lack of future plans. Masa asks him if Dickson was around for a long time, and Faddey tells Dickson was Sigizmund's doctor, but not since too long. Faddey also blames Dickson for giving Sigizmund bad medicine and thus letting him die. Masa runs to the manor, comes in, arrives at the living room and hides.

Fandorin, who noticed Masa coming in, questions Dickson. The doctor tells the cognac was clean and Kazimir's death was from an infarctus. When Fandorin tels Masa to go get the bottle in Japanese, Dickson mentions the bottle is broken. Fandorin gets suspicious of the doctor and accuses him for having poisoned Kazimir and having been on the fan's trail for a long time (he figures the doctor has at one point been to Japan). When the doctor gives up and prepares to spill everything he's shot by someone from outside. Fandorin tries to go through the window to follow the killer, but his broken arm slows him down.

When Fandorin comes in again, the rest of the family and friends join him. Everybody's here except Arkasha. Planning to unmask the killer by his wet clothes Fandorin is puzzled as every person has wet clothes for one reason or another. While Fandorin explains his theories to the rest, Arkasha listens silently, hidden behind a wall. Slyunkov makes Yan sign a paper about his heritage, the latter signs the paper without even reading it. Fandorin orders no-one may leave the house until the killer is found. Yan supposes the person who stole the fan hid it either in the basement or in the attic. Fandorin hesitates, but Inga ensures him he should take a chance. Fandorin then heads to the basement.

Meanwhile, Arkasha plays a jealousy scene in front of Glasha. Masa joins them and asks if Arkasha and Dickson are friends. Once again, Arkasha denies, but Glasha acknowledges. When Masa tries to make Arkasha go with him to make Fandorin question him, Arkasha finds a chair and breaks the light with it. Then he flees.

In the basement, Fandorin and Masa discover the thief: it is Slyunkov. He spontaneously stole the fan and is completely unrelated to every other crime that happened. He indeed hid the fan in the basement and now tries to get away in silence. Fandorin takes a look at the paper Yan signed earlier and finds out it is a contract of disposal for the fan. This was necessary, as the fan is only told to work when in hands of its rightful owner. Fandorin supposes Slyunkov should give it a try. Slyunkov turns it white side towards him and does the ritual. Nothing happens. Slyunkov faints. Fandorin takes the fan away and gives it to Masa. As Masa tells Fandorin Dickson and Arkasha are operating together, Fandorin storms off. On the first floor he learns from the restless Inga that Yan is in the attic and Arkasha just went there to join him, and both of them run to the attic, much to Faddey's amusement.

Arrived to the attic, they discover Arkasha and Yan struggling on the floor. Yan picks up a gun lying nearby and shoots Arkasha. Then Fandorin, thanks to the dust on the floor, reconstructs some of the events and explains them to Yan and Inga, as well as his theory. Masa inspects the corpse and finds out Arkasha wasn't shot once, but twice. Fandorin then realizes the gun belonged to Yan, and not to Arkasha. He also inspects the walls and finds that the bullet Yan said he dodged was indeed fired by him in order to kill a panicking crime partner. That's when Fandorin blames him for being the mastermind behind Sigizmund's death and all the other deaths, all this to get money from selling the rare fan. Realizing he's trapped, Yan grabs Inga and points a syringe full of tetanus bacteria towards her. Masa is forced to give him the fan and he flees. Fandorin says Yan would probably be intercepted by the police surrounding the manor. Masa then reveals the fan to the world. What was in the box he gave to Yan was the scroll he used to write down Russian words so he could learn them.

=== Black Version ===
The play begins with Yan trying to get the black rabbit he used as a guinea pig from Inga. He tries to convince her he's on his way to discover a vaccine against the tetanus, but Inga refuses to give him the rabbit. She turns the conversation to uncle Sigizmund's will and their future marriage.

When both arrive at the living room, they discover the whole family and friends in a wide range of states. Most of them seem outraged. When Slyunkov is asked to read the will again, it is revealed that all Sigizmund's money goes to Inga, Yan gets a Chinese paper fan, and the rest gets nothing. Slyunkov notices that the fan must be passed on in presence of a person called Erast Fandorin. As Slyunkov says, Mr Fandorin was expected in the morning, but somehow didn't make it to the manor yet. Arkasha admits having prepared a cart and sent a quite dumb coachman to get Fandorin. Finally, Slyunkov agrees to give the fan to Yan without further ado. While in a bad state, the item looks impressive and has its two sides of different colors: black and white. Dickson suggests Yan would sell it to a collector. Interested in the money that would make, Kazimir takes the fan and discusses a possible sale with Dickson. He asks Yan to bring him some cognac, which Yan does, and drinks it. Inga manages to get the fan away and jokingly slaps Kazimir with the fan's black side. All of a sudden, Kazimir starts shivering and drops dead.

That's where Fandorin enters the room and tells the family he had an accident because of rough roads and a not so solid cart. He has a broken leg and is in a wheelchair. He is accompanied by Masa who is only starting to learn Russian. The family tries to hide the corpse from him, but he finally notices it. Nevertheless, Fandorin tells the family that the fan is known to be magical. When turned white to the person and black to the world, waving it and singing an incantation eight times would make the person happy and wealthy at the expense of the rest, and vice versa if the fan is turned other way. It can also heal by slapping with its white side and kill by slapping with its black one. Having heard that, Inga remembers slapping Kazimir and faints. The electric lights go off because of the storm, and when they're on again, the fan is missing. Fandorin plans on questioning every present person, asks Dickson to autopsy the body and check the cognac for poison, then tells everybody except Yan to leave. When Kazimir's body is being pulled away, Fandorin sees a paper falling off his pocket and keeps it.

After some hesitations, Yan supposes his aunt Lidiya would be the thief, as she wants youth and wealth desperately. Then he mentions the price Dickinson said the fan was worth, and Fandorin impresses Yan by telling him the real price of the fan as an antique item. Yan decides to sell the fan after it is found to get money and go on with his researches. Yan rushes to Lidiya's room. Meanwhile, Arkasha tries to impress Glasha with his guitar playing and singing, but Masa arrives and steals the spotlight, much to the lackey's chagrin.

Fandorin then questions Inga, and she tells him about having fallen in love with Yan (who didn't change that much since he was a kid, but whom she admires for being a genius) and about Kazimir's disastrous situation in life. Meanwhile, an embarrassed and jealous Arkasha makes fun of Masa. Masa asks him if it was he who prepared the cart. Arkasha denies, but Glasha acknowledges. Arkasha and Masa fight, and Masa prevails.

Fandorin confronts Lidiya on Kazimir's death. He supposes there was poison in the wine and she was involved. He reminds she had an affair with Kazimir and shows her the paper he got from the deceased, in which Lidiya promises Kazimir she'd never lend him money again and asks him to leave her alone. Stanislav enters the living room to discover his wife in tears and congratulates her for supposedly having poisoned Kazimir, only to blame her for the affair and lending money to Kazimir a beat later.

Masa and Glasha sit on a bench outside and talk. They are surprised by Faddey. Glasha leaves and Faddey sits on the bench and laments about his destiny as a manservant and his total lack of future plans. Masa asks him if Dickson was around for a long time, and Faddey tells Dickson was Sigizmund's doctor, but not since too long. Faddey also blames Dickson for giving Sigizmund bad medicine and thus letting him die. Masa runs to the manor, comes in, arrives at the living room and hides.

Fandorin, who noticed Masa coming in, questions a slightly drunk Dickson. The doctor is stunned as he doesn't seem to find an explanation for Kazimir's death, his autopsy having revealed nothing abnormal. Fandorin asks about the bottle and Dickson pulls it out of his pocket, telling he drank everything. He turns it upside down to reveal it's empty. Fandorin gets suspicious of the doctor and accuses him for having poisoned Kazimir and washed the bottle to hide evidence. The doctor starts telling a story about his having debts he couldn't return and when he mentions someone who paid everything for him, he's shot by someone from outside. Fandorin tries to go follow the killer, but falls from his wheelchair and remains lying on the floor, helpless. Faddey arrives and helps him seat back on his wheelchair.

Later, the rest of the family and friends join Fandorin. Everybody's here except Arkasha. Planning to unmask the killer by his wet clothes Fandorin is puzzled as every person has wet clothes for one reason or another. While Fandorin explains his theories to the rest, Arkasha listens silently, hidden behind a wall. Slyunkov makes Yan sign a paper about his heritage, the latter signs the paper without even reading it. Fandorin mentions that in order to make the fan work, its owner must also wear the Dao Helmet. When he describes it, Faddey mentions there is one in Sigizmund's private museum, an isolated building in the garden. Fandorin then declares that no-one may leave the house, to what Yan opposes, saying he's rather spend all this time at his laboratory, which is in the garden as well.

In the private museum, Fandorin, Masa and Faddey discover the thief as he pulls the Dao Helmet on his head: it is Slyunkov. He spontaneously stole the fan and is completely unrelated to every other crime that happened. He indeed stole the fan and now tries to find a way to make it work. Fandorin takes a look at the paper Yan signed earlier and finds out it is a contract of disposal for the fan. This was necessary, as the fan is only told to work when in hands of its rightful owner. Fandorin supposes Slyunkov should give it a try. Slyunkov turns it white side towards him and does the ritual. Nothing happens, much to Slyunkov's despair. Fandorin tells Faddey to get the fan back to where it belongs and Masa helps him go out. Alone with Faddey Slyunkov tries slapping himself with the white side of the fan and is surprised to see it work: as he pulls the helmet off, his hair turns black, he became younger and healthier. Faddey refuses to do the same. Relieved, Slyunkov gives Faddey the fan and runs away, ecstatic.

Outside (the text says "in front of the curtains", but it obvious these actions take place outside, between the house, the museum and the lab), Masa rolls the wheelchair with Fandorin on it. As they speak Japanese, Fandorin mentions Arkasha and Masa runs to find him. Inga comes over. Fandorin laments about being unable to take part in the action because of his broken leg. When Inga mentions she was going to Yan's lab, Fandorin asks her to tell him they found the fan.

Glasha is in the kitchen, beating some meat with a wooden meat tenderer. Arkasha scares her as he enters. He starts playing a jealousy scene in front of her. Masa storms in and asks if Arkasha and Dickson are friends. Once again, Arkasha denies, but Glasha acknowledges. When Masa tries to make Arkasha go with him to make Fandorin question him, Arkasha takes the meat tenderer from Glasha and breaks the light with it. Then he flees.

In Yan's lab, Yan is concentrated on his dying rabbits and laments about not having found the perfect vaccine yet. Inga is by his side, she fantasises about their marriage and future life together, but suddenly Yan admits he'd rather remain single and devote his life to science. He suggests he should sell the fan to Inga, so he could make some money and have a complete lab. Inga hesitates, but then agrees. They don't see Arkasha walking in behind their backs.

Masa, Fandorin and Faddey arrive to the lab. Fandorin knocks and hears Arkasha's shouts. Masa breaks in only to discover a dead Arkasha, an astonished Yan with a pistol in his hand and Inga with blood all over her forehead. Fandorin explains Arkasha wanted the fan all along, which is why he saved Dickson from his creditors. And now, when his end was near, Arkasha was searching for a place to hide. Fandorin takes the gun from Yan and looks closer at it. Meanwhile, Yan gets back to his rabbits. That's when Fandorin points the gun at him and blames him for being the mastermind behind Sigizmund's death and all the other deaths, all this to get money from selling the rare fan. Yan is shocked, nevertheless he doesn't resist when Masa and Faddey lock him into a closet (he manages to take with him a living rabbit and another full syringe). Masa and Faddey leave with Arkasha's body and only then Fandorin tell Inga it was her all along, and he only faked suspicion of Yan in order to her to reveal more evidence. He tells her Sigizmund would never give her this fan so she never would be tempted to use it. That's when Inga reveals she now possesses the fan and slaps Fandorin with its black side, incapacitating him, but keeping him alive. She reveals Kazimir's drink was in nothing poisoned and she slapped him only to ensure herself the fan worked. Then she turns the fan the white side towards her, performs the ritual and faints. Yan bursts out of the closet letting a living rabbit go and says the vaccine worked. Fandorin is surprised when he realizes he doesn't feel pain in his leg anymore and can stand up. But he can't understand why did the fan work the wrong way. That's when Faddey explains he repaired it after taking it from Slyunkov, but when he glued the paper back, he turned it the wrong way. Yan sits Inga on Fandorin's wheelchair and says she got infected with tetanus and will certainly remain paralyzed for life.
