= Didier Bienaimé =

French actor

Didier Jean-Michel Serge Bienaimé (9 June 1961 – 7 August 2004) was a French actor. He is the older brother of Nathalie Bienaimé.

Didier Bienaimé was born June 9 1961 in Troyes, France. He worked as a tutor with disadvantaged children. The 1995 film "Mary of Nazareth", in which he played Jesus, brought Didier fame and revealed his creative potential. In addition, he participated in various theatrical productions.

Bienaimé really wanted to voice his role in the film "The Turkish Gambit" on his own, but died the day before his arrival in Russia to voice it. Director Janik Fayziev decided to leave the actor's speech in French in the film, voicing only some of the lines himself. He recalled: "Didier really wanted to voice the film himself. He had a fantastic ear, and he got so excited that by the end of filming he was already somehow explaining himself in Russian. On the last day, he made me promise that no one else would voice his character. "Even if you don't have enough money for my arrival, I will still come and work for free."

== Partial filmography ==
(please expand)

- 2005: The Turkish Gambit
- 2001: "La Grand Vie!"
- 1999: Joséphine, ange gardien
- 1995: "Mary of Nazareth"
