= He Lover of Death =

2001 novel by Boris Akunin

- Russian edition
- Author: Boris Akunin
- Original title: Любовник смерти
- Language: Russian
- Series: Erast Fandorin
- Genre: Historical detective
- Publisher: Zakharov
- Publication date: 2001
- Publication place: Russia
- Media type: Print (hardback & paperback)
- Pages: 352
- ISBN: 5-8159-0213-6
- Preceded by: She Lover of Death
- Followed by: The Diamond Chariot

He Lover of Death is a novel by Russian author Boris Akunin. The book is a historical detective novel featuring the fictional character Erast Fandorin. The book was initially published in Russia in 2001. This is the ninth novel in the Erast Fandorin series. The book was released in English by Weidenfeld and Nicolson in 2010.

== Plot ==
The novel is set in 1900. Erast Fandorin looks for a treasure hidden in a basement. The case involves a mysterious lady called Death, whose lovers die under strange circumstances.
