= The Flying Elephant =

Novel by Boris Akunin

- Author: Boris Akunin
- Original title: Летающий слон
- Language: Russian
- Series: Brüderschaft with Death
- Genre: Historical detective
- Publication date: 2008
- Publication place: Russia
- Preceded by: The Torment of a Broken Heart
- Followed by: Children of the Moon

The Flying Elephant (Russian: Летающий слон, romanized: Letaushi slon) is a novel by Boris Akunin, the first part of the second book on the adventures of Russian and German spies during the First World War. It describes the dangerous adventures of Joseph von Teofels in Russia in early 1915.

== Plot ==
In early 1915, Emperor Wilhelm II decides to stop active operations on the Western Front, and bring the entire power of the German Army against the Russians in the Eastern Front. The offensive plan is carefully designed, the advantage in artillery is overwhelming, but the Russian Army suddenly has a "miracle weapon" that can frustrate all the Germans' efforts. This is the world's first four-engined heavy bomber, the "Ilya Muromets". At present there is only one, but if Russia can mass-produce it, it could make a major change in the course of the war. The Kaiser personally orders the chief of German intelligence not to allow this, and again the German spy Josef von Teofels (known as Sepp) comes into action.

Penetrating a detachment of Russian pilots under the guise of "pilot Michael Dolohov from the United States", Sepp painfully reflects on how to destroy the aircraft. Neither the explosion of "Ilya Muromets" or the murder of the inventor would help: the Russians will immediately understand that this is the work of the Germans, and they will do their best to start the mass production of the bomber. The only chance for Theophels is to compromise the concept, to portray the plane in a negative light during a general inspection which will be headed by the Supreme Commander-in-Chief of the Russian Army, Grand Duke Nikolai Nikolayevich.
