= The Diamond Chariot =

2003 novel by Boris Akunin

- Russian edition
- Author: Boris Akunin
- Original title: Алмазная Колесница
- Language: Russian
- Series: Erast Fandorin
- Genre: Historical detective
- Publisher: Zakharov
- Publication date: 2003
- Publication place: Russia
- Pages: 720
- ISBN: 5-8159-0388-4
- OCLC: 66597972
- Preceded by: He Lover of Death
- Followed by: Jade Rosary Beads

The Diamond Chariot (Russian: Алмазная Колесница, the Russian term for the "Diamond Vehicle" (kongōjō) school of Tantric Buddhism) is a historical mystery novel by internationally acclaimed Russian detective story writer Boris Akunin, published originally in 2003. It is the tenth novel in Akunin's Erast Fandorin series of historical detective novels. As with all of the other Fandorin novels, The Diamond Chariot was hugely successful in Russia, selling out its first printing of 200,000 copies in a week.

The Diamond Chariot is available in English since September 2011 from Orion Books, translated by Andrew Bromfield.

== Overview ==
The novel consists of two volumes. In the first one, Dragonfly-Catcher—set in Russia during the Russo-Japanese War in 1905, Fandorin is charged with protecting the Trans-Siberian Railway from Japanese sabotage. In the second volume, Between the Lines—set in Japan in 1878 and 1879, the story of Fandorin's arrival and life in Yokohama is told, including the encounter with his servant Masa and finding a Ninjutsu teacher.

The first volume is structured as a haiku, with each chapter corresponding to a syllable, while in the second part, a haiku is placed at the end of each chapter.

== Adaptation ==
- In 2012, the author, Boris Akunin has announced in his own blog that the book will be adapted into TV series, that will be produced by Central Partnership. Sergey Ursulyak is set to direct the series.
