= The State Counsellor =

2000 russian novel by Boris Akunin

- Russian edition
- Author: Boris Akunin
- Original title: Статский советник
- Translator: Andrew Bromfield
- Language: Russian
- Genre: Historical detective
- Published: 2000; 2008 Weidenfeld & Nicolson (Eng. trans.)
- Publication place: Russia
- Media type: Print (Hardback)
- ISBN: 0-297-84823-2
- OCLC: 173498829
- Preceded by: Special Assignments
- Followed by: The Coronation

The State Counsellor (Russian: Статский советник, the 5th civil grade in the Table of Ranks of Imperial Russia) is the sixth novel in the Erast Fandorin historical detective series by Russian writer Boris Akunin. It is subtitled "political detective mystery" (Russian: политический детектив). The State Counsellor was originally published in Russia in 2000. The English translation was published in January 2008.

== Plot ==
Moscow, 1891. Disguised as Fandorin, the leader of a revolutionary organization murders a general. Fandorin has to catch him. He is assisted (or is it hindered?) in his investigations by Prince Pozharsky, a fictional descendant of Dmitry Pozharsky, who helped bring the Time of Troubles to an end.

== Film, TV or theatrical adaptations ==
In 2005, The State Counsellor was turned into a film starring Oleg Menshikov as Fandorin and Nikita Mikhalkov as Prince Pozharsky. The two-hour theatrical release was then expanded into a 3 1/2 hour version which was shown on Russian television. It was one of the most expensive Russian films ever made.
