= Nothing Sacred (novel) =

2010 novel by Boris Akunin

- Author: Boris Akunin
- Original title: Ничего святого
- Language: Russian
- Series: Brüderschaft with Death
- Genre: Historical detective
- Publication date: 2010
- Publication place: Russia
- Preceded by: Mariya, Maria...
- Followed by: Operation Transit

Nothing Sacred (Russian: Ничего святого, romanized: Nichego svyatogo) is a 2010 novel by Boris Akunin, the second part of the fourth book on the adventures of Russian and German spies during the First World War. It describes the new confrontation of Aleksey Romanov and Joseph von Teofels in the autumn of 1916.

== Plot ==
In November 1916 the German high command, after the heavy defeats suffered by its ally the Austro-Hungarian Empire, concluded that a military victory over Russia is impossible. One of their best spies, Josef von Theofels (known as Sepp), suggests a proven method which had been used by Japanese intelligence in 1905. Consequently, the Germans provoke a revolution in Russia by generously financing Lenin and his party, because they foresee an early defeat in the war.

The chief of German intelligence rejects Sepp's plan, and offers his own — the assassination of Nicholas II, expecting that the emperor's death would cause confusion and a struggle for power that would drive Russia out of the war. Wilhelm II, who is Nikolai's cousin, would never allow such an operation, and so Theofels must kill the Tsar by making it look like an accident, deciding to engineer a rail accident. Sepp assembles a group of militant nationalists who hate Nicholas II. At the same time, Duke Kozlovsky the Russian chief of counterintelligence sends his best agent, Aleksei Romanov, to the front to examine how well the security of "train number 1", in which the Emperor Nicholas II travels along the front, is organized. Romanov discovers that the retinue of Nicholas includes a traitor who informs German intelligence of all the movements of the royal train. Aleksei discerns a possible assassination attempt and begins to act, seeking to prevent the murder of the Tsar....now read on
