= Boris Akunin =

Russian writer (born 1956)

- Борис Акунин
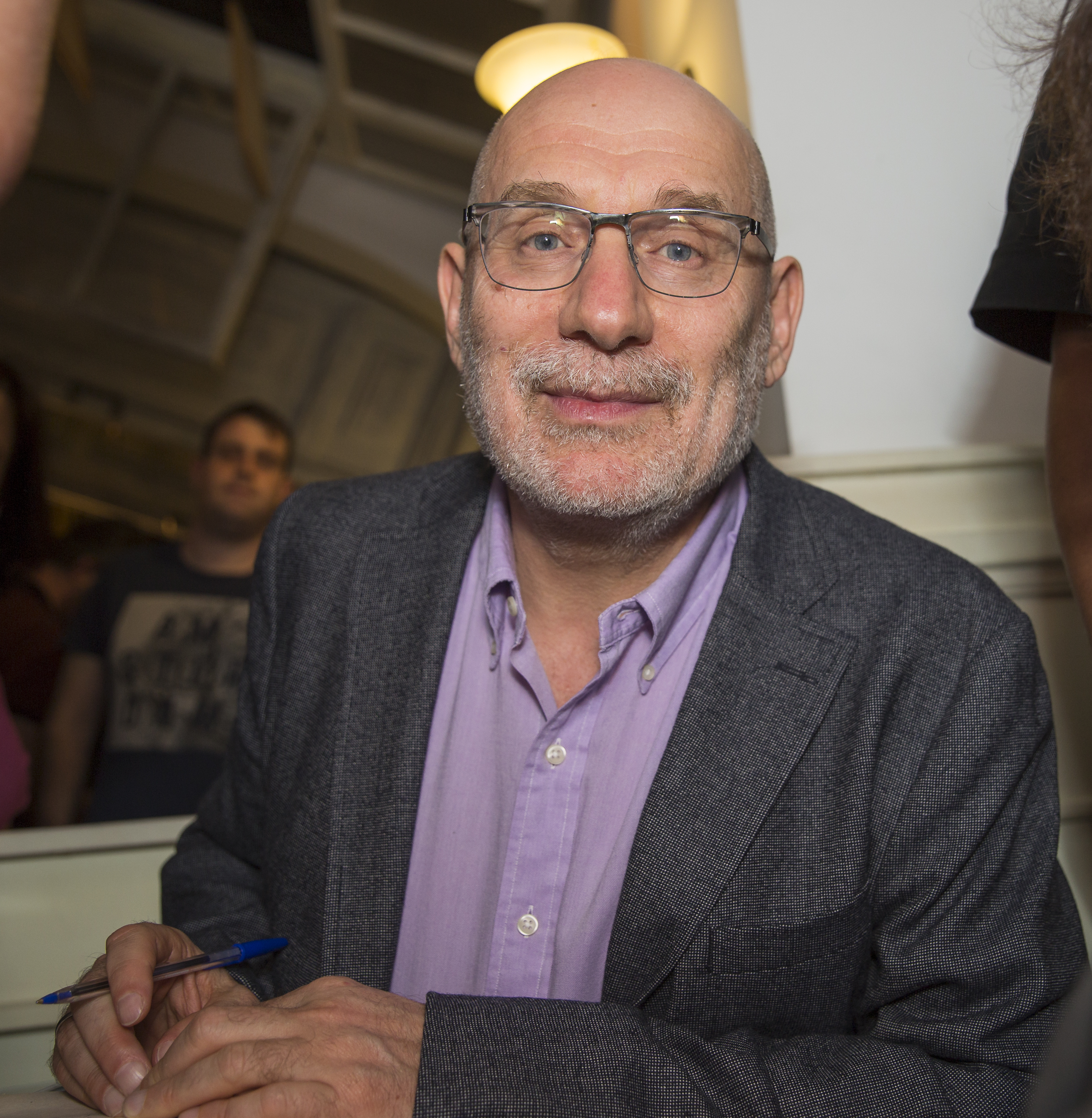
- Akunin in 2018
- Born: Grigory Chkhartishvili; 20 May 1956 (age 70); Zestaponi, Georgian SSR, Soviet Union
- Citizenship: Russia
- Education: Institute of Asian and African Countries at Moscow State University
- Occupations: Writer, journalist, translator
- Writing career
- Pen name: Anatoly Brusnikin, Anna Borisova, Akunin-Chkhartishvili
- Period: 1980s–present
- Genres: Detective; historical fiction
- Notable work: Erast Fandorin series
- Website: www.akunin.ru

Grigori Chkhartishvili (Note: Russian: Григорий Шалвович Чхартишвили, romanized: Grigoriy Shalvovich Chkhartishvili; Georgian: გრიგორი ჩხარტიშვილი) (born 20 May 1956), better known by his pen name Boris Akunin, (Note: Russian: Борис Акунин) is a Georgian and Russian writer residing in the United Kingdom. He is best known as a writer of historical fiction, specifically his Erast Fandorin detective novels. He is also an essayist and literary translator. Grigory Chkhartishvili has also written under pen names Anatoly Brusnikin, Anna Borisova, and Akunin-Chkhartishvili. His characters include Erast Fandorin, Nicholas Fandorin and Sister Pelagia.

== Early life ==
Chkhartishvili was born on 20 May 1956 in Zestaponi to a Georgian father and a Jewish mother. He moved to Moscow in 1958.

== Career ==
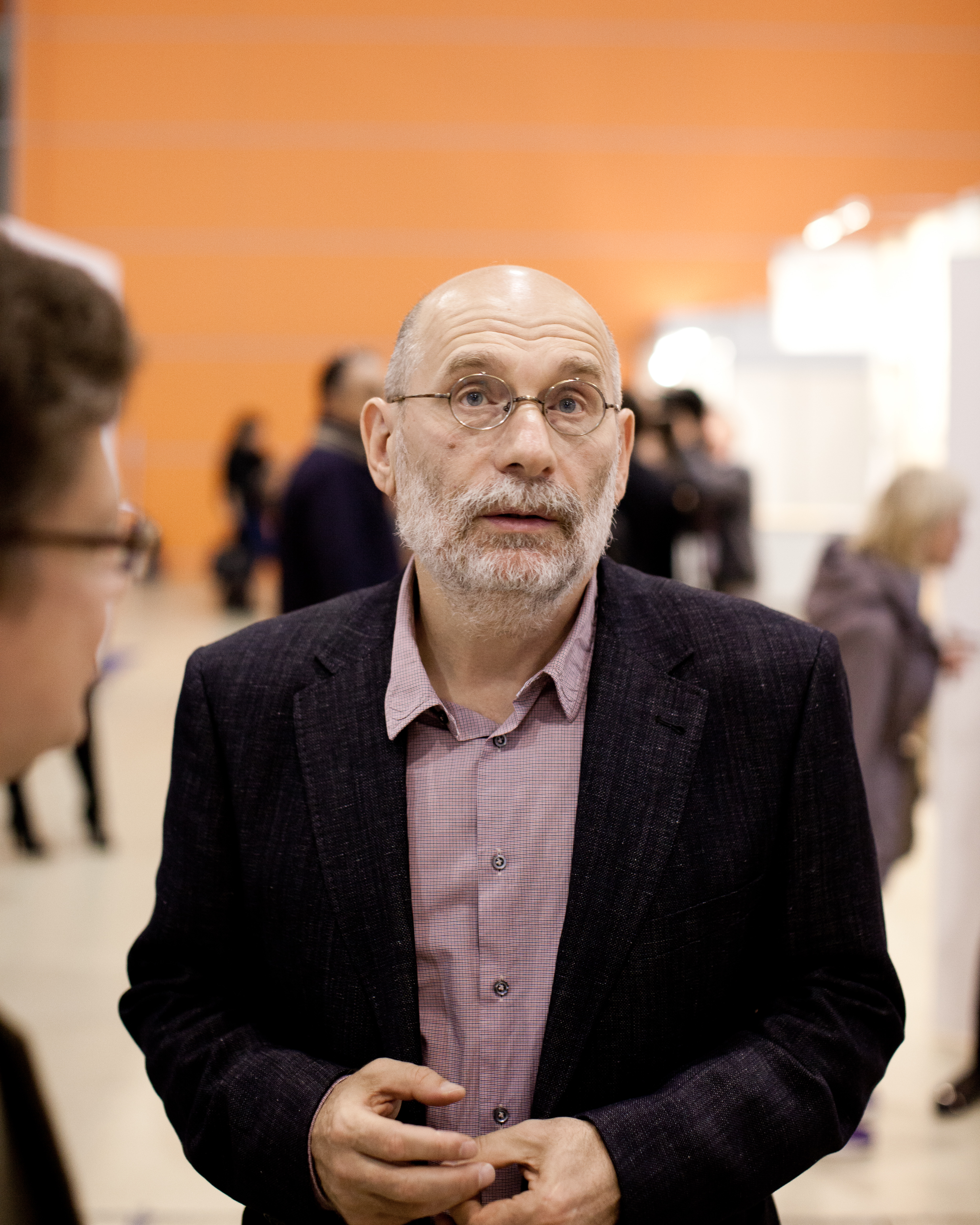
Moscow International Book Fair 2013

Chkhartishvili worked as assistant to the editor-in-chief of the magazine Foreign Literature, but left in October 2000 to pursue a career as a fiction writer.

Influenced by Japanese kabuki theatre, he joined the historical-philological branch of the Institute of Asian and African Countries of Moscow State University as an expert on Japan. He was engaged in literary translation from Japanese and English. Japanese authors Yukio Mishima, Kenji Maruyama, Yasushi Inoue, Masahiko Shimada, Kobo Abe, Shinichi Hoshi, Takeshi Kaiko, Shohei Ooka were published in his translation, as well as representatives of American and English literature (T. C. Boyle, Malcolm Bradbury, Peter Ustinov, etc.).

Under his given name of Grigory Chkhartishvili, he was editor-in-chief of the 20-volume Anthology of Japanese Literature, chairman of the board of a large "Pushkin Library”, and is the author of the book The Writer and Suicide (Moscow, The New Literary Review, 1999). He has also contributed literary criticism and translations from Japanese, American, and English literature under his own name.

He publishes other critical and documentary works under his real name.

Since 1998, he has been writing fiction under the pseudonym “B. Akunin", decoding "B" as "Boris". "Akunin" (悪人) is a Japanese word that translates to "bad person" or "villain". In his novel The Diamond Chariot, the author redefines an "akunin" as a great evil man who creates his own rules.

Under the pseudonym Boris Akunin, he has written many works of fiction, mainly novels and stories in the series The Adventures of Erast Fandorin, The Adventures of Sister Pelagia, The Adventures of the Master (following Nicholas Fandorin, Erast's grandson), all published in Russia by Zakharov Books, and the Roman-Kino ("Novel-Film") series set during World War I. Akunin's specialty is historical mysteries set in Imperial Russia. It was only after the first books of the Fandorin series were published to critical acclaim that the identity of "B. Akunin" (i.e., Chkhartishvili) was revealed.

Akunin lived in Moscow until 2014. He has since lived in Britain, France and Spain. As of 2024 he is living in London.

== Recognition ==
Chkhartishvili has been called by Igor Pomerantsev the "undisputed champion" of Russian crime fiction, given that, as Boris Akunin, he "has written more than a dozen crime novels and has been widely appreciated by discerning readers ... and has been translated into many languages".

== Political views ==
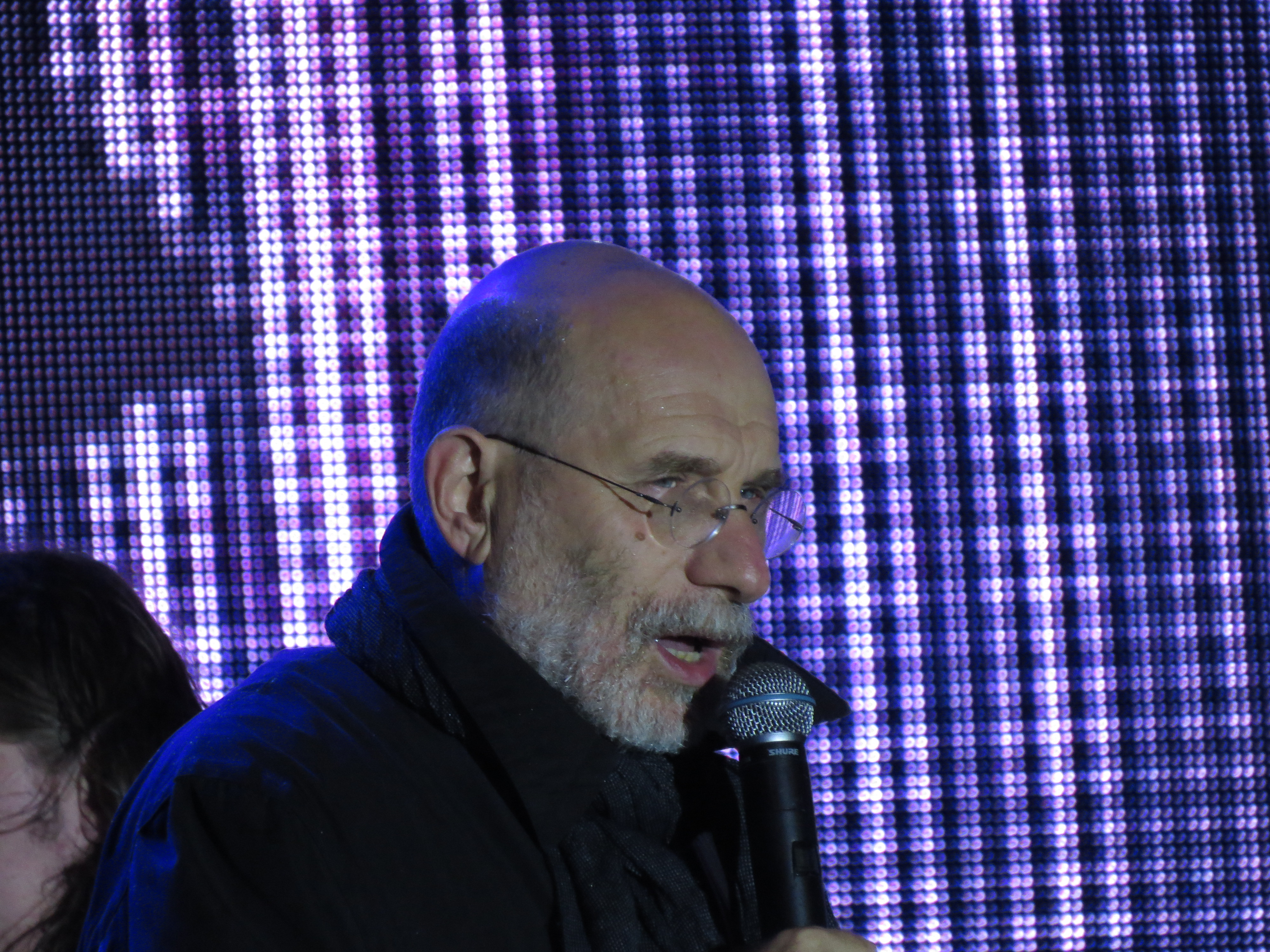
Akunin at a rally-concert in support of Alexei Navalny during his 2013 mayoral campaign

Akunin has been critical of Vladimir Putin's domestic and foreign policies since the invasion of Georgia and the annexation of Crimea. After the death of Alexei Navalny, Akunin said: "There is nothing more the dictator [Putin] can do to Navalny. Navalny is dead and has become immortal".

Akunin participated in a fundraiser in 2022 to benefit Russians accused of "discrediting" the Russian army under the Russian 2022 war censorship laws.

In December 2023, the pranksters Vovan and Lexus called Akunin and Dmitry Bykov, pretending to be representatives of the Ukrainian Government, and released the recordings of Akunin and Bykov expressing their support for Ukraine. The response in Russia was negative: many Russian publishing booksellers, including publishing company AST, ceased publication and distribution of Akunin's and Bykov's works. One of the few booksellers that continued to distribute Akunin's books, Zakharov Books, came under investigation by the Investigative Committee of Russia. Russian politician Andrey Gurulyov called Akunin an "enemy" that "must be destroyed".

Akunin was then added by Rosfinmonitoring to its list of terrorists and extremists, with Akunin specifically believed to be complicit in terrorist activity by the Russian Government. The government also opened a criminal case against Akunin, with allegations of discreditation of the Russian army. In response, Akunin wrote on Facebook: "Terrorists declared me a terrorist." In an article on his website, Akunin has warned Russians abroad to not return to Russia.

In January 2024, Akunin was designated a "foreign agent" by the Russian Ministry of Justice. This designation requires that the subject identify themselves as a "foreign agent" on social media and any other publications, and imposes heavy financial reporting requirements. Later that month, Russia's Interior Ministry put his name on a wanted list for alleged criminal activity. In February the same year, a Moscow court ordered the arrest of Akunin in absentia. In July 2025, he was sentenced in absentia to 14 years in prison for promoting terrorism and spreading false information about the Russian Armed Forces.

In June 2024, the online library of Boris Akunin was blocked in Russia due to the library's distribution of Vladimir Sorokin's book The Heritage.(Russian: Наследие, romanized: Naslediye).

== Awards and honors ==
In the year 2000, Akunin was nominated for the Smirnoff-Booker Prize. In September 2000, Akunin was named Russian Writer of the Year and won the "Antibooker" prize 2000 for his Erast Fandorin novel Coronation, or the last of the Romanovs.

In 2003, the British Crime Writers' Association placed Akunin's novel The Winter Queen on the short list for the Dagger Award in Fiction. In 2004, he was a member of the jury at the 26th Moscow International Film Festival.

On 10 August 2009, for the contribution to the development of cultural ties between Russia and Japan, he was awarded the prize of the Japan Foundation acting under the auspices of the government.

Laureate of the Noma Prize (2007, Kodansha Publishing House, Japan) - "For the best translation from Japanese of works of the writer Yukio Mishima".

== Adaptations ==
Two Fandorin novels, The Turkish Gambit and The State Counsellor, were made into big-budget Russian movies. Azazel was adapted twice for television, first as The Winter Queen, and later as Fandorin. Azazel, produced by Yandex Studios and the Kinopoisk streaming service.

An English remake of The Winter Queen was due to go into production. It was set to start filming in 2007, but the leading actress, Milla Jovovich, became pregnant, and the production process was delayed to unknown date.

Pelagia and the White Bulldog was made into a TV mini-series in 2009, while The Spy Novel came out in a 2012 theatrical release as Spy.

== List of works ==
- Erast Fandorin series (publication dates in parentheses). Each historical mystery novel is assigned its own subgenre of detective fiction (conspiracy, political, etc.):
1. The Winter Queen, original title Azazel / Азазель (1998). A conspiracy mystery. 1876. The 20-year-old Fandorin begins his career by accidentally stumbling over a plot for world domination.
2. The Turkish Gambit / Турецкий гамбит (1998). A spy mystery. 1877. Fandorin takes part in the Russo-Turkish War and the Siege of Plevna as he is trying to uncover a Turkish spy.
3. Murder on the Leviathan, original title Leviathan / Левиафан (1998). A closed set-up mystery. 1878. Fandorin investigates a murder while traveling on a steamship headed from England to India.
4. The Death of Achilles / Смерть Ахиллеса (1998). A hired assassin mystery. 1882. Upon returning from diplomatic service in Japan, Fandorin tackles the mysterious death of Mikhail Skobelev (called "Sobolev" in the novel) in a Moscow hotel.
5. Special Assignments:
  1. The Jack of Spades / Пиковый валет (1999). A novella about confidence men. 1886. Fandorin hunts down a clever gang of swindlers.
  2. The Decorator / Декоратор (1999). A novella about a maniac. 1889. After ending his string of murders in England, Jack the Ripper surfaces in Moscow.
6. The State Counsellor / Статский советник (1999). A political mystery. 1891. Revolutionary terrorism in late 19th-century Russia takes center stage, as Fandorin is pursuing a group of daring radicals.
7. The Coronation / original title Coronation, or the Last of the Romanovs (Коронация, или Последний из Романов) (2000). A high society mystery. 1896. The plot surrounds the ascension of Tsar Nicholas II, whose family is being blackmailed by an international supervillain.
8. She Lover of Death / Любовница смерти (2001). A decadent mystery. 1900. A decadent suicide society causes a stir in Moscow.
9. He Lover of Death / Любовник Смерти (2001). A Dickensian mystery. Simultaneously with the decadent society investigation, Fandorin is looking into a series of murders in the slums of Khitrovka, Moscow.
10. The Diamond Chariot / Алмазная колесница (2003). An ethnographic mystery. Events of the Russo-Japanese War of 1905 set against a flashback to Fandorin's diplomatic service in Yokohama in 1878.
11. Ying and Yan / Инь и Ян (2006). A play about Erast Fandorin, set in 1882.
12. The Jade Rosary / Нефритовые четки (2006). Seven short stories and three novellas set between 1881 and 1900. Some of the "holes" in the narrative are filled, including Fandorin's service in Japan, his investigations in the 1880s while a Deputy for Special Assignments in the Moscow city administration and his adventures in America.
13. All the World's a Stage / Весь мир театр (2009). A theatrical mystery. 1911. The 55-year-old Fandorin has his life turned upside-down when investigating strange incidents in a fashionable Moscow theater.
14. The Black City / Черный город (2012). 1914. While pursuing a daring Bolshevik terrorist, Fandorin goes to the Azerbaijani capital Baku, where his wife is shooting a motion picture.
15. Planet Water / Планета Вода (2015). Three novellas set between 1903 and 1912: Planet Water (1903, a treasure hunt in the Atlantic), A Lonely Sail (1906, a cruel murder of an abbess from a distant monastery), and Where Shall We Paddle? (1912, a pursuit of a cruel train robber in Poland).
16. Not Saying Goodbye / Не прощаюсь (2018). A novel set between 1918 and 1921. In his final adventure, Erast Fandorin finds himself in a country radically transformed by the Revolution and the Russian Civil War.
17. Erast Fandorin's Dao / Дао Эраста Фандорина (2023). Three shorts set in 1876, 1896 and 1917.
18. Tamba's Lessons / Уроки Тамбы (2023). A novella set in 1878, at same time with The Diamond Chariot.
19. Frog Bashō / Лягушка Басё (2023). Interactive detective.

Note: (The Jack of Spades and The Decorator were published together in a single volume, Special Assignments: The Further Adventures of Erast Fandorin / Особые поручения.

- Masahiro Shibata series (publication dates in parentheses) (spin-off of the Fandorin series)
1. Just Masa / Просто Маса (2020). A novel set in 1923. New adventure of Masahiro "Masa" Shibata after Fandorin's death.
2. Yama / Яма (2023). A novel set in 1900. Memories of Masahiro Shibata.
- Sister Pelagia series (about a crime-solving nun in turn-of-the-20th-century provincial Russia):
1. Pelagia and the White Bulldog / Пелагия и белый бульдог (2000). A bishop of a large Volga province sends an astute nun Pelagia to look into mysterious deaths of his aunt's prize-winning dogs.
2. Pelagia and the Black Monk / Пелагия и черный монах (2001). Mysterious events in a remote monastery force bishop Mitrofani to start an inquiry, which only leads to more tragedy.
3. Pelagia and the Red Rooster / Пелагия и красный петух (2003). A stranger who has started a new sect in provincial Russia becomes the focus of sinister and deadly plots.
- Nicholas Fandorin series (about Erast Fandorin's grandson, a modern-day British historian):
1. Altyn Tolobas / Алтын-толобас (2000). Nicholas visits Russia in 1995 to investigate artifacts left by his ancestor, Cornelius von Dorn, a German soldier in the service of the Russian czar in the 17th century. Cornelius's story is told in alternating chapters.
2. Extracurricular Reading/ Внеклассное чтение (2002). Nicholas' adventures in Moscow in 2001 are told together with a story of a 7-year-old prodigy entangled in a regicidal plot at the end of Catherine the Great's reign.
3. F.M. (2006). Nicholas is looking for a lost Dostoevsky manuscript, a fictional original draft of Crime and Punishment written as a detective novel.
4. The Falcon and the Swallow / Сокол и Ласточка (2009). Nicholas and his British aunt are looking for a treasure in the Caribbean. The origin of the treasure is told in a story about Laetitia von Dorn (Cornelius's niece) set in 1702.
- The Genres Project (novels written in different fiction genres, each book's title refers to the particular genre):
1. Children's Book / Детская книга (2006). Erast Fandorin Jr. (Nicholas' ten-year-old son) goes on a time-travelling adventure.
2. Spy Novel / Шпионский роман (2005). Set in 1941, just before Hitler's invasion of the Soviet Union. State security officers are on the trail of a deeply embedded German spy.
3. Science Fiction / Фантастика (2006). Two young men cope with their mysteriously acquired superpowers in the Soviet Union's dying days.
4. Quest / Квест (2008). In 1930, an Indiana Jones-like American scientist and two of his colleagues go to Moscow in an attempt to disrupt Soviet eugenics experiments. The novel imitates a computer game. The second part of the narrative, called Codes to the Novel is set in 1812, during Napoleon's invasion of Russia.
5. Children's Book For Girls / Детская книга для девочек (2012). Co-authored with Gloria Mu. Angelina Fandorina (Erast Jr.'s twin sister) goes on a time-traveling, world-saving quest of her own.
6. Fairy Tales from Around the World / Сказки народов мира (2021)
- Brüderschaft with Death (A "cinematic novel", written as a collection of ten novellas ("films") about the rivalry between Russian and German intelligence during World War I. Each "film" is written in a different cinematic genre. There are two main characters in the series: Alexei Romanov and Sepp von Theofels). The following "films" have been released in Russian:
1. The Infant and the Devil / Младенец и черт (2007). Comedy. July 1914. A German ace of espionage is trying to steal the plans of Russian military operations, as a young St. Petersburg student unexpectedly interferes.
2. The Torment of a Broken Heart / Мука разбитого сердца (2007). Melodrama. November 1914. Junior sergeant Alexei Romanov, sent away from the front after being wounded, takes part in an operation in Switzerland, where Russian intelligence is attempting to neutralize a "dealer in secrets."
3. The Flying Elephant / Летающий слон (2008). Aeronautic adventures. April 1915. Captain von Theofels infiltrates Russia's Special Aviation Corps in order to sabotage the development of the world's first heavy bomber, the Sikorsky Ilya Muromets.
4. Children of the Moon / Дети Луны (2008). A decadent étude: August 1915. Ensign Romanov, fresh after completing the Russian General Staff's counter-intelligence course, goes undercover into a Petrograd society of young decadents. One of the members is about to transfer a copy of secret military documents to a German spy.
5. The Wandering Man / Странный человек (2009). Mystical. December 1915. Major von Theofels is trying to discredit the head of Russian military intelligence. To achieve his goal he is trying to get close to a mysterious "Wanderer" who greatly resembles the historical Grigory Rasputin. The Russian title plays with the double meaning of the word "странный": wandering (archaic meaning) and strange, weird.
6. Let the Thunder of Victory Rumble! / Гром победы, раздавайся! (2009). Front-line sketch. April 1916. Junior lieutenant Romanov's adventures at Russia's South-Western Front, as he is trying to ensure the secrecy of the plans for the impending Brusilov Offensive.
7. Mariya, Maria... / "Мария", Мария ... (2010). A true tale of the sea. October 1916. Major von Theofels has a new assignment, to sabotage the Russian battleship Imperatritsa Mariya.
8. Nothing Sacred / Ничего святого (2010). A hellish scheme of the Germans. November 1916. Von Theofels and his nemesis Alexei Romanov are about to meet again as the German spy is preparing an assassination of Czar Nicholas II. This time, Romanov, now a lieutenant, is a much more worthy opponent.
9. Operation Transit / Операция "Транзит" (2011). Preapocalyptic. April 1917. With Russia facing political turmoil after the February Revolution, the Germans hope to further the collapse by helping the Bolshevik leader V. I. Lenin return to the country. Major von Theofels' new assignment is to ensure his safe passage.
10. The Angels Battalion / Батальон ангелов (2011). Apocalyptic. Summer 1917. With Russia's ability to sustain the war at an end and the army demoralized, the Russian Provisional Government creates the Women's Battalion of Death in order to boost the soldiers' morale. Stabskapitän Alexei Romanov joins the strange outfit as an instructor.
- History of the Russian State (История Российского государства). A series of non-fiction books documenting the history of Russia from the 9th century to 1917, complemented by a series of fictional works.
1. A Part of Europe - From the beginnings to the Mongol Conquest / Часть европы - От истоков до монгольского нашествия (2013). History of Russian statehood from its beginnings (9th century) up to the Mongol Conquest (early 13th century).
2. The Fiery Finger / Огненный перст (2013). Three historical novellas set between the 9th and 13th centuries: The Fiery Finger (the adventures of a Byzantine spy in the Slavic lands in 856 AD), The Devil's Spittle (political games at the court of Yaroslav the Wise in 1050) and Prince Cranberry (about a young ruler of a tiny duchy, located dangerously close to the Wild Steppe, in 1205).
3. A Part of Asia - The Horde Period / Часть Азии - Ордынский период (2014). History of Russian statehood under the Mongol rule (from early 13th century to mid-15th century).
4. Bosch and Schelm / Бох и Шельма (2014). Two historical novels. The first novel tells of a horrific invasion of Tartars (Mongols) in 1237 and is narrated from both the Russian and Mongolian perspectives, falling into the Tragic Genre. The second novel is about the adventures of a smart swindler who is wandering around Russia and the neighbouring countries on the eve of dramatic events – the great Battle of Koulikovo in 1380 where the united Russian army faced the army of the Golden Horde. The novel is comical and belongs to the Picaresque genre.
5. Between Asia and Europe - From Ivan III to Boris Godunov / Между Азией и Европой - От Ивана III до Бориса Годунова (2015). History of Russian statehood from Ivan III (mid-15th century) up to Boris Godunov (first years of the 17th century).
6. Widow's card or Widow's kerchief / Вдовий плат (2016). Two historical novels. Widow's card is set in the times of Ivan III, while The mark of Cain takes place during Ivan IV's reign.
7. Between Europe and Asia - The Seventeenth Century / Между Европой и Азией - Семнадцатый век (2016). Russia's emergence from The Time of Troubles and the reigns of the early Romanovs.
8. Sennight of the Three-Eyed / Седмица Трехглазого (2017). A historical detective novel, relaying the life of a 17th-century Moscow sleuth and a play To Kill The Snakelet about Peter the Great's coup to overthrow princess Sophia Alekseyevna.
9. Asiatic Europeization - Czar Peter Alexeyevich / Азиатская европеизация - Царь Пётр Алексеевич (2017). The reign of Peter the Great foundation of the Russian Empire.
10. Nutshell Buddha / Ореховый Будда (2018). A novel about the adventures of a Japanese monk and an orphan Russian girl in Peter the Great's Russia.
11. Eurasian Empire - The Era of Czarinas / Евразийская империя - Эпоха цариц (2018). Post-Peter 18th century Russia, including the reign of Catherine the Great.
12. Goodventures and Ruminations of Lucius Katin / Доброключения и рассуждения Луция Катина (2019). A novel set in the middle of the 18th century, focusing on an idealistic young man and his desire to bring about progress and enlightenment.
13. The First Superpower - Alexander the Blessed and Nicholas the Unforgettable / Первая сверхдержава - Александр Благословенный и Николай Незабвенный (2019). Russia's rise and fall as a European superpower during the reigns of Alexander I and Nicholas I.
14. Peace and War / Мир и война (2020)
15. Medicine for the empire. The Liberator Tsar and the Peacemaker Tsar / Лекарство для империи. Царь-освободитель и царь-миротворец (2021)
16. Road to Kitezh / Дорога в Китеж (2021)
17. As he walked away, he asked / Он уходя спросил (2022)
18. The destruction and resurrection of the empire. The Lenin-Stalin era / Разрушение и воскрешение империи. Ленинско-сталинская эпоха (TBA)
- Non-series books:
1. The Seagull / Чайка, Комедия в двух действиях (2000). A reworking of Anton Chekhov's Seagull as a mystery
2. Comedy/Tragedy / Комедия/Трагедия (2000). Two plays, Hamlet, a Version and Mirror of Saint Germain
3. Fairy Tales for Idiots / Сказки для Идиотов (2000). A collection of short stories, not related to any of the series.
4. Screenplays / Сценарии (2006). Original screenplays written by Akunin for three of his novels.
5. Photos as Haiku / Фото как хокку (2011). A collection of biographical stories sent in by the readers of Akunin's blog.
6. The Most Frightening Villain and other stories / Самый страшный злодей и другие сюжеты (2012). A collection of blog posts from 2010 to 2011.
7. A Real Princess and other stories / Настоящая принцесса и другие сюжеты (2013). A collection of blog posts from 2011 to 2012.
8. The most mysterious secret and other stories / Самая таинственная тайна и другие сюжеты (2014). A third collection of blog posts.
9. The Northern sentry and other stories / Северный Часовой и другие сюжеты (2015). A fourth collection of blog posts.
- As Grigory Chkhartishvili:
1. The Writer and Suicide / Писатель и самоубийство (1999). A non-fiction study of suicide in literary circles throughout history.
2. Cemetery Tales / Кладбищенские истории (2004). Written as both Boris Akunin and Grigory Chkhartishvili, the book consists of literary essays about cemeteries in different parts of the world, each accompanied by a macabre short story. One of the short stories (Shigumo) features Erast Fandorin, and is included in The Jade Rosary.
- As Boris Akunin-Chkhartishvili:
1. Aristonomia / Аристономия (2012). Akunin's first attempt to write "serious literature", as opposed to genre fiction. The novel is set during the turmoil of the February and October Revolutions and the Russian Civil War, with philosophical ruminations on the nature and development of human dignity woven into the plot.
2. Another Way / Другой Путь ' (2015). The novel is set in 1927, as Joseph Stalin is consolidating power. The main character finds true love and continues his philosophical work, now on the subject of intimacy and love's transformative powers.
3. Happy Russia / Счастливая Россия (2017). The story continues in 1937, at the height of Stalin's purges. A secret society of Moscow freethinkers, who philosophized about an ideal future for their country, is investigated by the secret police.
4. Tresorium / Трезориум (2019). A novel theory of primary education is explored in the Warsaw Ghetto, and a young Soviet officer seeks his destiny in War-ravaged Europe.

=== Anatoly Brusnikin ===
In November 2007, AST, one of the publishing houses with which Akunin is affiliated, came out with a historical mystery novel by a new author, Anatoly Brusnikin, called Девятный спас (Devyatny Spas, The Ninth Savior). Despite the fact that Brusnikin was a complete unknown, AST spent lavishly on an advertising campaign for the book, which almost immediately resulted in rumors that Brusnikin might actually be Akunin in a new disguise.

The rumors about the authorship of Devyatny Spas were also fueled by the total secrecy surrounding the person of the author and the fact that his name, A. O. Brusnikin, is an exact anagram of Boris Akunin. AST has also released a photograph of Brusnikin, which greatly resembled Chkhartishvili's face.

In January 2012, two years after the second Brusnikin novel was published and just prior to the release of the third one, Chkhartishvili admitted in his blog that it was indeed him hiding under a new nom-de-plume. The reason for creating another alter ego was Akunin's desire to write historical novels without a mystery component and to attempt a "Slavophile" look at Russian history in lieu of his usual "Westerner" outlook. The Brusnikin "photograph" was revealed to be a combination of Chkhartishvili's face with the face of a studio designer who made the picture.

To date, three Brusnikin novels have been written.

1. The Ninth Savior / Девятный Спас (2007). Set in the beginning of Peter the Great's reign, it follows the lives of three friends (clearly modeled after the Three Bogatyrs of the Russian folk tales) and a scion of the Romanovs named Vasilisa (modeled after Vasilisa the Wise) and their involvement in a series of sinister plots.
2. A Hero of A Different Time / Герой иного времени (2010). An homage to Lermontov's A Hero of Our Times, it is set during the Caucasus War in the early 1840s.
3. Bellona / Беллона (2012). The Crimean War is the main subject.

Akunin has said he has no definite plans to write more Brusnikin novels, though he remains open to the possibility.

=== Anna Borisova ===
At about the same time as Brusnikin had made his appearance, Chkhartishvili's other disguise, Anna Borisova, hit the bookstores relatively undetected. In this literary experiment, Chkhartishvili wanted to attempt to write as a woman and to get away from detective and adventure fiction. Similar to the Brusnikin ruse, the "photograph" of Borisova released by the publisher was actually a combination of Chkhartishvili's face with that of his wife. Borisova's work, though not overly complicated, is more literary and philosophical in nature. There were three Borisova novels written.

1. There... / Там ... (2007). Victims of a terrorist attack in Moscow experience afterlife, each in accordance with their very different beliefs.
2. The Idea-Man / Креативщик (2009). A mysterious stranger walks the streets of Saint Petersburg, telling people strange and fascinating stories.
3. Vremena goda (2011). Set in a French retirement home for Russian-speaking clientele. The main characters are a young Muscovite doctor suffering from a potentially fatal brain aneurism and a supercentenarian owner of the home incapacitated by the locked-in syndrome.

Akunin has said that he will not write any more Borisova novels "unless I get a sex-change (surgery)".
