= The Coronation (novel) =

Book by Boris Akunin

- Recent Russian language edition
- Author: Boris Akunin
- Original title: Коронация, или Последний из романов
- Language: Russian
- Series: Erast Fandorin
- Genre: Historical detective
- Publisher: Zakharov
- Publication date: 2000
- Publication place: Russia
- Media type: Print (Hardback & Paperback)
- Pages: 349
- ISBN: 5-8159-0059-1
- OCLC: 44149409
- LC Class: PG3478.K78 K67 2000
- Preceded by: The State Counsellor
- Followed by: She Lover of Death

The Coronation (Russian: Коронация, или Последний из романов, meaning "Coronation, or the Last of the Romanovs") is a historical detective novel by Russian writer Boris Akunin, published originally in 2000. It is subtitled великосветский детектив ("high-society detective"). This novel was published in English in February 2009.

The scene of this seventh novel in the Erast Fandorin series is set in 1896 Moscow, at the time of the coronation of Tsar Nicholas II (between 6 May and 20 May O.S.). Akunin prominently features the Khodynka Tragedy of 18 May 1896, when a crowd at the coronation festival stampeded and nearly 1400 people were killed.

The book won the Russian Anti-Booker prize in 2000 for prose. Many Akunin fans in Russia state this book is his best, reading about the tragic atmosphere of late 19th century Russia. However, members of the Russian Orthodox Church objected to the negative portrayal of many members of the Romanov family, especially the characterization of the character Grand Duke Simeon Alexandrovich as a homosexual.

== Plot ==
The story is told from the perspective of Afanasi Ziukin, the majordomo of Grand Duke George Alexandrovich. Erast Fandorin investigates the abduction of Grand Duke Mikhail, the four-year-old youngest son of George Alexandrovitch, by criminal mastermind "Doctor Lind" whom Fandorin has been pursuing for several years. Their initial confrontation is briefly described in the novella "Dream Valley" from the Jade Rosary Beads collection. This time, Lind demands the Orlov diamond, a prerequisite for the upcoming coronation, as a ransom. Nicholas II is portrayed as dependent on his uncles Cyril and Simeon, the Governor-General of Moscow.

Akunin distorts the Romanov family relations somewhat. The three uncles of Nicolas II (sons of Alexander II) are semi-fictitious:

- George Alexandrovich, named after George Alexandrovitch, Nicholas' younger brother, but based on Nicholas' brother-in-law Grand Duke Alexander Mikhailovich.
- Simeon Alexandrovich, the Governor General of Moscow is based on Nicholas' real uncle Sergei Alexandrovich.
- Cyril Alexandrovich is based on Nicholas' real uncle Vladimir Alexandrovich of Russia, and named after Cyril, Vladimir's son.

== Title ==
The original Russian title, Коронация, или Последний из романов, could be literally translated as Coronation, or the Last of the novels (note the lack of capitalization on the last Russian word). The title is however to be understood as The Last of the Romanovs, although the last word should then have been Романовых. The reason for the broken Russian in the title becomes apparent only at the very end of the book, where an Englishman says this phrase using his dictionary, failing to inflect the last word correctly. Despite its title, this is not the last Fandorin novel. The title of the German translation is : Die Entführung des Großfürsten, subtitled: Fandorin ermittelt (translation: The Grand Duke's abduction).

== Sources ==
- Shneidman, N.N. Russian Literature, 1995-2002: On the Threshold of the New Millennium. 2004, University of Toronto Press. ISBN 0-8020-8670-5
- Štulhofer, Aleksandar, and Theo Sandfort. Sexuality and Gender in Postcommunist Eastern Europe and Russia. 2005, The Haworth Press. ISBN 0-7890-2293-1
- Wachtel, Andrew. Remaining Relevant after Communism: The Role of the Writer in Eastern Europe. 2006, University of Chicago Press. ISBN 0-226-86766-8
- Full text of the novel, in Russian
