= Let the Thunder of Victory Rumble! (novel) =

2009 novel by Boris Akunin

- Author: Boris Akunin
- Original title: «Гром победы, раздавайся!»
- Language: Russian
- Series: Brüderschaft with Death
- Genre: Historical detective
- Publication date: 2009
- Publication place: Russia
- Preceded by: The Wandering Man
- Followed by: Maria, Maria...

Let the Thunder of Victory Rumble! (Note: Russian: Гром победы, раздавайся!, romanized: Grom pobedy, razdavaysya!, IPA: [ɡrom pɐˈbʲedɨ rəzdɐˈvajsʲə]) is a novel by Boris Akunin, the second part of the third book on the adventures of Russian and German spies during the First World War. It describes the military adventures of Aleksei Romanov in the spring of 1916 in Galicia.

== Plot ==
On 1 April 1916, a secret meeting is held at the headquarters of the Supreme Command of the Russian Army. After the heavy defeats of 1915 almost all the front commanders are afraid to take active steps. But the commander of the South-Western Front asks the Czar for permission to attack. The South-Western Front does not have a large number of troops and artillery and there are no reserves for the front, but the commander confidently declares that he is ready to attack the Austro-Hungarian Army. After some hesitation, Nicholas II gives the order to advance.

The commander's plan is built on the element of surprise. Preparation for the offensive begins immediately on 25 sections of the front line, but this is done only in order to confuse the enemy. Only one will become the real breakthrough point.

Aleksey Romanov, who serves just on the South-Western Front, travels to the area. He must deceive the Austrian spies, giving them the impression that there will be no offensive. However, Austrian intelligence is very active. A great help to the Austrians is provided by Ukrainian nationalists fighting for the future independence of Ukraine.

== Historical basis ==
- In the story there are characters based on real historical figures. Chief of Staff of the Supreme Headquarters, Chief of Staff (Russian: Главштаб, romanized: Glavshtab) - General Mikhail Alekseyev. Commander of the Northern Front, (Russian: Главсев, romanized: Glavsev) - General Aleksey Kuropatkin. Commander of the Western Front (Russian: Главзап, romanized: Glavzap) - General Alexei Evert. The key figure is the commander of the South-Western Front (Russian: Главюгзап, romanized: Glavyugzap) is General Aleksei Brusilov, an outstanding Russian and Soviet military leader, the author of the famous Brusilov Offensive.
- The title of the book is the first line of the unofficial Russian national anthem, which first sounded in 1791 and was written in honor of the capture of Izmail by Russian troops under the command of Alexander Suvorov. In 1833, Emperor Nicholas I approved a new official anthem - God Save the Tsar!
