= Erast Fandorin =

Fictional detective in novels by Boris Akunin

Erast Petrovich Fandorin
- Oleg Menshikov as Erast Fandorin in the 2005 movie The State Counsellor.
- First appearance: The Winter Queen
- Last appearance: The Pit
- Created by: Boris Akunin
- Portrayed by: Oleg Menshikov; Egor Beroev; Ilya Noskov; Simon Robson; Piotr Zurawski

In-universe information
- Aliases: Erast Petrovich Nameless ("He Lover of Death"), Genji ("She Lover of Death"), Erast Petrovich Kuznetsov ("Before the End of the World")
- Nicknames: Funduk (schoolmates); Erasmus (Count Zurov)
- Gender: Male
- Occupation: April–May 1876: Moscow police clerk May–September 1876, July 1877-March 1878: Agent of the Third Section; September 1876-July 1877: Volunteer in the Serbian Army; 1878-1882: Diplomat; 1882-1891: Deputy for Special Assignments under the Governor-general of Moscow; 1891-1904: private investigator, engineer and adventurer 1904-1905: Consulting engineer for the Railroad Police Department.
- Spouses: Yelizaveta "Lizanka" von Evert-Kolokoltseva (1876), Eliza Altairskaya-Lointaine (1911–1914), Yelizaveta Anatolievna "Mona" Turusova (married 1919)
- Children: "Captain Vasily Rybnikov" (son, 1879–1905), Alexander Fandorine (son), born 1920

Erast Petrovich Fandorin (Russian: Эраст Петрович Фандорин) is a fictional 19th-century Russian detective and the hero of a series of Russian historical detective novels by Boris Akunin.

The first Fandorin novel (The Winter Queen, Russian: Азазель) was published in Russia in 1998, and the latest and the last one in 2023 (The Pit, Russian: Яма). More than 15 million copies of Fandorin novels have been sold as of May 2006, even though the novels were freely available from many Russian websites and the hard copies were relatively expensive by Russian standards. New books in the Fandorin series typically sell over 200,000 copies in the first week alone, with an unparalleled (for mystery novels) first edition of 50,000 copies for the first books to 500,000 copies for the last.

The English translations of the novels have been critically acclaimed by, among others, Ruth Rendell.

== Background ==
In the Soviet Union, detective novels enjoyed mass popularity. Although they were seen as a "low genre" by the communist officials, both local (such as Igor (Georgy) Vayner and Julian Semenov), and foreign detective novels have always been avidly coveted.

After the collapse of the Soviet Union, many trashy detective novels were published that featured a lot of gore and sex. Akunin's wife, in common with many other Russians, started to enjoy reading this genre of literature. However, she did not want to be seen reading the novels and she always wrapped them in brown paper to prevent people from seeing what she was reading. This inspired Akunin to create a detective novel which nobody would be ashamed to be caught reading, something between the literature of Leo Tolstoy and Fyodor Dostoevsky and the pulp of modern Russian detective novels.

He set out to write a cycle about Fandorin with an exploration of every subgenre of the detective novel in mind, from spies to serial killers. In addition, he wanted to address different types of human character in his books. As Akunin identified sixteen subgenres of crime novels, as well as sixteen character types, the novels in the Erast Fandorin series ultimately numbered sixteen, with the final novel, Not Saying Goodbye, published in 2018. The series is titled Новый детективъ (New detective, or New Mystery). This title serves to set the novels apart from the postmodernist intellectual novels as well as from the trashy detective novels, but it is also a subtle play on the use of time in the novels.

Akunin uses many historical settings for his novels. He uses the war between Russia and the Ottoman Empire as background for the novel The Turkish Gambit; the death of the "White General" Mikhail Skobelev (as 'Mikhail Sobolev') in The Death of Achilles; and the coronation of Tsar Nicholas II and the Khodynka Tragedy for Coronation, or the Last of the Romanovs. Akunin uses the gaps in the knowledge of these histories to create an atmosphere for his mystery novels to which readers can relate.

== Novels ==
English title		Russian title		Russian original publication	English translation	Genre
The Winter Queen		Азазель (Azazel)		1998	2003	Conspiracy mystery
The Turkish Gambit		Турецкий гамбит		1998	2005	Spy novel
Murder on the Leviathan		Левиафан (Leviathan)		1998	2004	Agatha Christie-type mystery
The Death of Achilles		Смерть Ахиллеса		1998	2005	Hired killer mystery
Special Assignments	The Jack of Spades	Особые поручения	Пиковый валет	1999	2007	A novella about confidence men
Special Assignments	The Decorator	Особые поручения	Декоратор	1999	2007	A novella about a maniac
The State Counsellor		Статский советник		2000	2009	Political mystery
The Coronation		Коронация, или Последний из Романов (Coronation, or the Last of the Romanovs)		2000	2009	High society mystery
She Lover of Death		Любовница смерти (Mistress of Death)		2001	2009	Decadent mystery
He Lover of Death		Любовник смерти (Lover of Death)		2001	2010	Dickensian mystery
The Diamond Chariot		Алмазная колесница		2003	2011	Ethnographic mystery
Ying and Yan		Инь и Ян		2006	none	Experimental play
The Jade Rosary		Нефритовые Четки (Jade Rosary Beads)		2006	2026	Different for each story in collection
All the World's a Stage		Весь мир театр		2009	2017	Theatrical mystery
Black City		Черный город		2012	2018	Thriller, political mystery
Planet Water		Планета Вода		2015	none	Technocratic mystery, nostalgic mystery, idiotic mystery
Not Saying Goodbye		Не прощаюсь		2018	2019	Historical

== Adaptations ==
=== Film ===
- The Turkish Gambit (2005): a theatrically released film starring Egor Beroev
- The State Counsellor (2005): a theatrically released film starring Oleg Menshikov

=== Television ===
- Azazel (2002): a miniseries starring Ilya Noskov
- Television Theater: "Lewiatan" (2021): feature length Polish adaptation of Murder on the Leviathan starring Piotr Zurawski
- Fandorin: Azazel (2023): a six episode series starring Vladislav Tiron, with the setting updated to the present day

=== Audio ===
- The Saturday Play: "Murder on the Leviathan" (2005): BBC Radio drama starring Simon Robson

== External sources ==
- Dmitry Babich, "The Return of Patriotism?", retrieved 17 August 2006.
- Rebecca Reich, The St. Petersburg Times, "Akunin's plot thickens", retrieved 17 August 2006.
- Author's Website: www.akunin.ru Includes the complete texts, in Russian, of the first six Erast Fandorin novels.
- Fan site Fandorin.ru
- Erast P. Fandorin Virtual Museum
- The Moscow News, "Boris Akunin: Murder by Cliches", retrieved 7 September 2006.
- Leon Aron, "A champion for the bourgeoisie: reinventing virtue and citizenship in Boris Akunin's novels" in The National Interest, Spring 2004, retrieved 29 September 2006.
- Akunin website containing the Russian texts of all Erast Fandorin novels through The Diamond Chariot
