= Maria, Maria... =

Russian novel by Boris Akunin

- Author: Boris Akunin
- Original title: "Мария", Мария...
- Language: Russian
- Series: Brüderschaft with Death
- Genre: Historical detective
- Publication date: 2010
- Publication place: Russia
- Preceded by: Let the Thunder of Victory Rumble!
- Followed by: Nothing Sacred

Maria, Maria... (Russian: "Мария", Мария...) is a novel by Boris Akunin, the first part of the fourth book on the adventures of Russian and German spies during the First World War. It describes the dangerous adventures of Joseph von Teofels in Sevastopol in the autumn of 1916.

== Plot ==
In September 1916, Russia is preparing for a decisive turn in the course of the war. In 1914, two German warships, the battleship Goeben and the light cruiser Breslau, had broken through to Istanbul, forcing the neutral Ottoman Empire into the world war on Germany's side. With the Bosphorous controlled by the Central Powers, Russia's main southern ports were cut off from her allies, and as a result, the Russian army could receive arms and ammunition from the Entente only through the northern seas, along a very long and dangerous sea route.

Deciding to break the "German-Turkish lock" on the Black Sea, the Imperial Russian Navy began to build new battleships at the shipyard in Nikolaev. Very soon, the battleship Empress Maria was launched, and at the end of 1916 two similar battleships - the Emperor Alexander III and the Empress Catherine the Great - would join the flagship. To prevent this, Josef von Teofels is sent by the German intelligence service to attempt to destroy the battleship Empress Maria.
