= Olga Krasko =

Russian actress

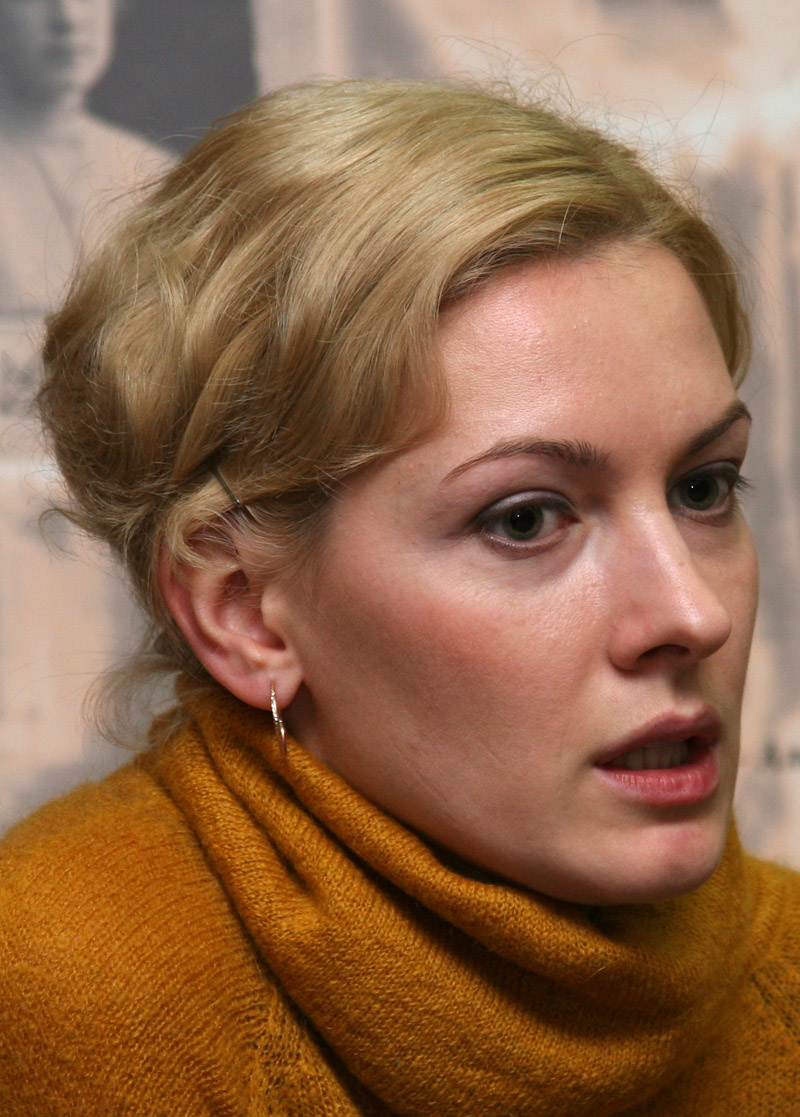
Olga Krasko, 2012

Olga Yuryevna Krasko (Russian: Ольга Юрьевна Красько) is a Russian actress, born 30 November 1981 in Kharkiv, Ukrainian SSR, Soviet Union. She has starred in Russian theater productions, and is noted that as the heroine in The Turkish Gambit (2005), she is the only female in a lead role in that film.

== Background ==
Krasko graduated from Moscow Art Theatre School in 2002.

== Filmography ==
- 2001 – Četnické humoresky (Gendarme Stories, in Czech) as Klaudie
- 2002 – Poirot's Failure as Flora
- 2003 – Četnické humoresky 2 (Gendarme Stories 2, in Czech) as Klaudie
- 2004 – Papa as Tanya
- 2005 – The Turkish Gambit as Varvara Suvorova
- 2005 – Time to Collect Stones as Nelya
- 2005 – Hunting for Iberia as stewardess
- 2005 – Yesenin as Lena
- 2007 – Masha and the Sea as Masha
- 2007 – Valeri Kharlamov. Extra Тime as Irina Kharlamovа
- 2007 – Četnické humoresky 3 (Gendarme Stories 3, in Czech) as Klaudie
- 2010 – In the Style of Jazz as Irina
- 2012 - present Sklifosovsky as Larisa Kulikova
- 2013 – Sherlock Holmes as Lisa Baker
- 2015 – Territory as Lyuda Hollywood
