= The Torment of a Broken Heart =

Novel by Boris Akunin

- Author: Boris Akunin
- Original title: Мука разбитого сердца
- Language: Russian
- Series: Brüderschaft with Death
- Genre: Historical detective
- Publication date: 2007
- Publication place: Russia
- Preceded by: The Infant and the Devil
- Followed by: The Flying Elephant

The Torment of a Broken Heart (Russian: Мука разбитого сердца, romanized: Muka razbitogo serdza) is a novel by Boris Akunin, the second part of the first book on the adventures of Russian and German spies during the World War I. It describes the dangerous adventures of Aleksei Romanov, who became a military intelligence officer. The story takes place in Switzerland, at the beginning of the First World War.

== Plot ==
...November 1914. Thanks to the mobilization plan (The Infant and the Devil) which was extracted by Joseph von Theofels, the Russian Army suffered a severe defeat in East Prussia. Protracted battles are fought throughout the whole line of the Eastern Front. Alexey Romanov is a volunteer, but in the first attack his arm gets wounded which causes him to be sent to the deep rear. Romanov learns that his romantic interest, a young lady named Seraphima, has married another man. Having become disillusioned in life, Romanov decides to commit suicide but is rescued by Duke Kozlovsky, who offers Alexei a new, perilous task.

... In neutral Switzerland for many years international scammer von Sommer has operated, who founded a kind of "espionage exchange". Acquiring various secret information, Sommer then resells it to intelligence agencies around the world. The swindler does not make any exceptions: he sells secrets to both the countries of the Triple Alliance and the Triple Entente countries. Sommer is independent from politics, he is only interested in money. Russian intelligence can not pay for Sommer's "tariffs", and so the decision is simply to steal a card file that is carefully guarded. The chief of Russian intelligence, General Vladimir Zhukovsky, decides to send a small group of agents to Switzerland under the guise of actors of a variety show. Aleksey Romanov is to become "Soloist" of the variety show and Duke Kozlovsky should portray a pianist. Romanov, Kozlovsky and several agents go hunting for von Sommer's secrets ...

The first attempt to retrieve the priceless card file ends in failure. Kozlovsky and Romanov are prepared to surrender, but help arrives from unexpected quarters: Clara Ninetti, a Romanian dancer in love with Alexei, and Rafael D’Arborio, a celebrated Italian poet and Claire’s latest boyfriend. D’Arborio approaches Romanov and offers his assistance, motivated in part by his support for Italy’s alliance with the Entente. Clara, who is Sommer’s mistress, could provide access to the house by attaching a rope ladder to a window. Meanwhile, the associates of the mysterious Don Trapano are prepared to open the safe and deal with Sommer’s guard. Don Trapano is a close friend of D’Arborio and a powerful figure in the Italian underworld...

== Interesting Facts ==
- In the novel there are characters based on real historical figures. "Rafael d'Arborio" is Gabriele D'Annunzio, the famous Italian poet, writer and journalist of the early 20th century. "Vladimir Zhukovsky" is Vladimir Dzhunkovsky, Russian general, deputy minister of internal affairs and commander of the Independent Corps of Gendarmes in 1913–1915.
