= The Turkish Gambit =

1998 novel by Boris Akunin

- Russian edition
- Author: Boris Akunin
- Original title: Турецкий гамбит (Turetskiy gambit)
- Translator: Andrew Bromfield
- Language: Russian
- Series: Erast Fandorin
- Genre: Historical detective
- Publisher: Zakharov (Russia), Weidenfeld & Nicolson (UK), Random House (US)
- Publication date: 1998
- Publication place: Russia
- English publication date: 2005 (UK January, US March)
- Media type: Print (Hardcover & Paperback), free text online (Russian)
- Pages: 211 (Hardcover English translation)
- ISBN: 5-8159-0045-1 (Russian); ISBN 0-297-64551-X (UK hc); ISBN 1-4000-6050-8 (US hc)
- Preceded by: The Winter Queen
- Followed by: Murder on the Leviathan

The Turkish Gambit (Russian: Турецкий гамбит, Turetskiy gambit) is the second novel from the Erast Fandorin series of historical detective novels by Russian author Boris Akunin. It was published in Russia in 1998. The English translation by Andrew Bromfield was published in 2005 as third of Fandorin novels, after Murder on the Leviathan which follows it in the internal chronology.

The novel is subtitled шпионский детектив ("espionage mystery"). It takes place in Bulgaria during the Russo-Turkish War (1877–1878) with Fandorin investigating the doings of a Turkish agent thwarting Russian advance. Each of the 14 chapters plus an epilogue is headed by a quote from a fictional newspaper article, some written by the novel's characters.

== Plot summary ==
The novel opens with a young Russian woman of "progressive" sympathies, Varvara Suvorova, traveling to meet her fiancé Pyotr Yablokov, who has volunteered to fight in the war between Russia and the Ottoman Empire. Her guide steals all her luggage and disappears as she approaches the war zone, but she is rescued by Erast Fandorin, who has been fighting as a volunteer to forget his tragedy. He accompanies her to Russian army headquarters to which he's bringing an important message. Upon arrival, Varvara is reunited with Pyotr, and Fandorin delivers his message: the Ottoman army is advancing towards the Bulgarian town of Plevna, which sits on the road to Sofia and must be taken so the Russian army can easily advance through Bulgaria and into Turkey.

Varvara sees little of her fiancé, who is busy with his duties as an army cryptographer, so she spends her time at the correspondents' club, where she meets various interesting characters: Irish reporter Seamus McLaughlin, French reporter Charles Paladin, Romanian army liaison Colonel Lukan (unlike Bromfield's English translation, some others use proper Romanian spelling "Lucan"), Russian hussar officer Count Zurov (Fandorin's old friend from The Winter Queen), and the charismatic General Sobolev (based on the real-life Mikhail Skobelev). Fandorin is informed that a Turkish agent, Anwar Effendi, is conducting an intelligence operation against the Russian army and might even have penetrated Russian headquarters. This is confirmed when the telegram directing the Russian army to take Plevna is mysteriously changed to an order to take Nikopol, a strategically irrelevant town. Varvara's fiancé Pyotr, who encoded the telegram, is jailed on suspicion of treason. Fandorin is charged with finding Anwar and uncovering the Turkish plot.

Because of the diversion of the Russian army to Nikopol, Ottoman troops arrive in Plevna first. The French reporter, Paladin, sneaks into the Ottoman camp and determines that only a small number of troops are in the town. Based on this information, the Russians attack Plevna, only to be bloodily repulsed because Paladin's data were incorrect and the Turks occupy the town in strength. The Russian army then settles in for a siege.

The Russians' first attempt to break the siege of Plevna ends in defeat when the Turks, who somehow have advance knowledge of the Russian attack plan, concentrate their artillery on the Russian formations before the Russians have a chance to move forward. Fandorin immediately suspects Colonel Lukan, who predicted to Varvara that the attack would fail. He asks Varvara to follow Lukan back to Bucharest and investigate him, but that effort ends when Paladin kills Lukan in a duel over Varvara's honor. Investigation of his possessions shows that he was indeed taking money from a mysterious 'J.'

In the following attempt to storm Plevna, Sobolev leads his troops in an attack that breaks through Plevna's defenses and finally enters the city, but he is unable to advance further due to insufficient forces. He sends several messengers to headquarters to request reinforcements, but all are killed in the fray. In the end, Count Zurov breaks through to the Russian side, but after meeting the journalists at their observation outpost disappears on his way to the headquarters and Sobolev, out of ammunition, is forced to withdraw. Later, a search party finds Zurov murdered on the battlefield, apparently stabbed by gendarme Colonel Kazanzaki, whom the dying Zurov managed to shoot. Pyotr unsuccessfully tries to hang himself, feeling responsibility for the carnage and defeat as he left the telegram unguarded when he went to welcome Varya and then sent it without checking; for the spy, knowing the not too strong Russian cipher, it was easy to replace it.

Three attempts to storm Plevna having failed, the Russian and Romanian armies besiege the city. By December, the Turks inside Plevna are starving. Varvara, on her way back from the hospital where she had been sent due to a case of typhus, encounters McLaughlin, the Irish reporter, who informs her that he has been tipped off that the Turks will surrender that night in a distant sector. She tells Fandorin, who guesses correctly that the Turks are not surrendering but trying to confuse the Russian army so they can stage a breakout. Thanks to his last-minute warning to Sobolev, the Russians manage to repel the attack after a fierce fight, the Turks in Plevna surrender, and McLaughlin, who has disappeared, is assumed to be the spy.

In the aftermath, Fandorin and Varvara are summoned to the presence of Emperor Alexander II and his Chancellor Alexander Gorchakov. Both the Emperor and Chancellor are furious at the treachery of McLaughlin. They believe him to have acted under direct orders of the British government, which – while ostensibly neutral – is in fact determined to prevent Russia from gaining a decisive victory over the Turks. Fandorin is dispatched to London to track down McLaughlin and either kidnap him, bribe him to change sides by the promise of a Russian estate, or at least denounce and discredit him in British public opinion. As later seen, Fandorin takes up the mission while having doubts – which he does not voice – as to McLaughlin's guilt.

In his absence Varvara, less and less enthusiastic about her fiancé and more and more intrigued by the dashing general Sobolev, accompanies the army as it advances through Bulgaria to Adrianople. Shortly thereafter, the Turks sue for peace, and negotiations commence. At the train station, where Sobolev has his headquarters, Paladin suggests that they ride the train into San Stefano, the undefended western suburb of Constantinople. Sobolev agrees, and he, Paladin, Varvara, and his entourage all ride in to San Stefano accompanied by one Russian battalion. En route Sobolev tells Varvara that after the war he intends to divorce his wife and proposes to then marry Varvara. She has very mixed feelings about this proposal, but before she has time to respond the train arrives in San Stefano and Sobolev must give his full attention to securing control of the town. The Russians set up headquarters in a bank building, and Paladin has convinced General Sobolev to advance into Constantinople – when Fandorin suddenly appears and unmasks "Charles Paladin", the French journalist, as Anwar Effendi, the master Turkish spy.

Fandorin recounts his investigation and notes how nobody at Paladin's newspaper had ever seen him and how Paladin's stories for years had been filed from cities where Anwar was known to be. His earliest byline "Paladin d'Hevrais" is a reference to Anwar's birthplace Hef-rais in Bosnia. (In the Russian original, the name is Charles d'Hevrais, Paladin being Bromfield's change.) Fandorin points out that it was Paladin who had distracted Peter Yablokov from encrypting the order to attack Plevna by telling him Varvara had arrived, thus gaining the opportunity to change the text from "Plevna" to "Nikopol". Having exposed Paladin, Fandorin now clears the name of McLaughlin – who was no spy, but an honest journalist, and far from being in the British government's pay, he was an Irish nationalist. McLaughlin disappeared, not because he ran away but because Paladin had him ruthlessly killed and his body disposed of.

Paladin/Anwar admits his identity, but then draws a gun and drags Varvara as a hostage into the bank's vault. Inside the vault, Anwar tells Varvara that after Sobolev entering Constantinople, the British fleet off the coast would open fire and Western powers would have declared war to Russia, bringing ruin to it. Even so, a Turkish regiment is advancing into San Stefano, originally planned to strike at Sobolev's rear.

In the meantime, Anwar explains to Varvara that everything he has been doing is in the name of his ideals. His purpose is to defend the development of human rights, reason, tolerance and nonviolent progress in the Western world against the expansion of the despotic and barbaric Russian Empire. His fatherland Turkey, which he deeply loves, is nevertheless the chess piece that he has planned to sacrifice or at least risk in his gambit in order to achieve a greater purpose – namely, to "protect humanity from the Russian threat".

Anwar, a believer in Evolution rather than Revolution, dislikes both the present Romanov Dynasty ruling Russia and the Russian revolutionaries with whom Varvara sympathizes, and predicts that in future there will arise in Russia a dangerous force "taking in the worst from both the East and the West" - a kind of premonition of Stalin's Soviet Union. Varvara angrily objects to Anwar's condemnation of Russia, stating that it has great literature as exemplified in Tolstoy and Dostoyevsky. Anwar counters that Russian literature is pretty good, but in general literature is a toy and can't be very important. He remarks that despite the absence of great literature in Switzerland, life there is much more dignified than in Russia. In an aside, Anwar admits to being "a bit" in love with Varvara – though, given his dangerous way of life, he can't afford emotional entanglements.

By the time their conversation has ended, it becomes clear that the Turkish attack has been driven off by Sobolev's soldiers, and Anwar, realizing that he is now trapped, lets Varvara out of the vault and kills himself.

In March 1878, the Russians, Romanians, and Turks sign the Treaty of San Stefano, ending the war. Varvara and Pyotr board the train back to Russia, and Fandorin is there to say goodbye before he leaves by ship for a diplomatic post in Japan – farthest possible from home, the only thing he asked when offered a reward. Varvara congratulates him for defeating Anwar, but Fandorin replies that Anwar did achieve his long-term goals: the peace treaty which the Russians extracted from the Ottomans is too generous, and the other great powers of Europe will force Russia to settle for less, leaving Russia weakened and impoverished with little to show for the war. Fandorin tries to say goodbye to Varvara but he cannot get the words out, and it is clear that they both have deep feelings for each other. Varvara takes his hand but says nothing, and boards the train, crying as she watches Fandorin while the train pulls away. The novel ends with a newspaper article proving Fandorin right; the European great powers – in particular, Britain – object to the treaty and agree to a diplomatic conference to draft a new settlement much less favorable to Russia.

== Film adaptation ==
The Turkish Gambit was made into a movie in Russia in 2005. It starred Yegor Beroyev as Fandorin and Olga Krasko as Varvara Suvorova. Dzhanik Faiziyev directed, and Boris Akunin adapted his own novel into a screenplay.
