= Murder on the Leviathan =

1998 novel by Boris Akunin

Leviathan
- Russian hardback version
- Author: Boris Akunin
- Original title: Левиафан
- Translator: Andrew Bromfield
- Language: Russian
- Series: Erast Fandorin
- Genre: Historical detective
- Publisher: Weidenfeld & Nicolson
- Publication date: 1998
- Publication place: Russia
- English publication date: April 2004
- Media type: Print (hardback & paperback)
- Pages: 704 pp
- ISBN: 0-7538-1843-4
- OCLC: 57282875
- Preceded by: The Turkish Gambit
- Followed by: The Death of Achilles

Murder on the Leviathan (Russian: Левиафан ("Leviathan"); British edition titled Leviathan) is the third novel in the Erast Fandorin historical detective series by Russian writer Boris Akunin. It was the second book in the series to be translated into English. Its subtitle is герметический детектив ("hermetic detective"). Akunin conceived of the Fandorin series as a summary of all the genres of detective fiction, with each novel representing a different genre. Leviathan is his nod to Agatha Christie's style, with an exotic setting, a cast of unusual characters who each have secrets of their own, and a strange murder to start the action.

== Plot summary ==
The novel is set in 1878. The story opens with the murder in Paris of Lord Littleby, all seven of his servants and two children of servants. All were poisoned except for Littleby, who was bludgeoned with an ancient Indian artifact, a golden statuette of Shiva, which belonged to Lord Littleby and was stolen from his room, along with an old Indian shawl.

French detective Gustave Gauche, in charge of the investigation, boards the passenger ship Leviathan. Gauche knows that the murderer must be one of the first-class passengers, because one of the special golden badges for the ship's first-class passengers was left in Littleby's room. Among the suspects are a Japanese Army officer, an addled English aristocrat, a married Swiss woman, and a clever young Russian diplomat on his way to his new post in Japan. The diplomat is Erast Fandorin, the master detective, who shoots down each of the ineffectual Gauche's incorrect conclusions, and in the end takes it on himself to find the murderer.

== Awards and nominations ==
- Leviathan was nominated for Best European Crime Novel in the Gumshoe Awards 2005.

== BBC Radio Adaptation ==
The novel was adapted for the BBC's Saturday Play. Simon Robson played Fandorin and Stephen Moore was Gauche. The original broadcast was on 3 December 2005.

== Television ==
The novel was adapted for the long running Polish television series Teatr Telewizji (Television Theater). The episode aired on 8 March 2021, and starred Piotr Zurawski as Fandorin.
