= The Winter Queen (novel) =

1998 novel by Boris Akunin

- Recent Russian edition
- Author: Boris Akunin
- Original title: Азазель (Azazel')
- Translator: Andrew Bromfield
- Language: Russian
- Series: Erast Fandorin
- Genre: Historical detective
- Publisher: Zakharov (Russia); Weidenfeld & Nicolson (UK); Random House (US)
- Publication date: 1998
- Publication place: Russia
- Media type: Print (Hardback & Paperback), free online text
- Pages: 222 (HB)
- ISBN: 5-8159-0494-5 (Russian HB)
- OCLC: 64556503
- Followed by: The Turkish Gambit

The Winter Queen (Russian: Азазель) is the first novel from the Erast Fandorin series of historical detective novels, written by Russian author Boris Akunin. It was subtitled конспирологический детектив ("conspiracy mystery").

== Plot summary ==
The novel opens on 13 May 1876 with a university student, Pyotr Kokorin, committing suicide in the public park in front of a beautiful young noblewoman, Elizaveta von Evert-Kolokoltseva. His will leaves his large fortune to the newly opened Moscow chapter of Astair House, an international network of schools for orphan boys founded by an English noblewoman, Lady Astair. The apparently open-and-shut suicide case falls to inexperienced 20-year-old detective Erast Fandorin. He interviews Elizaveta, and immediately falls in love with her. Further investigation reveals that Kokorin was playing Russian roulette (called "American roulette" in the novel) with another university student, Akhtyrtsev.

Fandorin tails Akhtyrtsev, who leads him to a sensuous dark-haired woman, Amalia Bezhetskaya, whom Fandorin recognizes from a picture in Kokorin's room. He follows Bezhetskaya to her home, where she spends her time toying with the many men who come to visit. At Bezhetskaya's home, Fandorin meets Count Zurov, an Army officer that Amalia seems fond of, and sees Akhtyrtsev again. Akhtyrtsev and Fandorin leave Amalia's house together to go drinking, and Akhtyrtsev reveals to Fandorin that the Russian roulette game between him and Kokorin was Bezhetskaya's idea. Just as the mystery of Kokorin's suicide seems to be solved, a mysterious white-eyed assassin stabs Akhtyrstev to death and tries to kill Fandorin, only to fail when his knife bounces off the corset Fandorin is wearing. As he kills Akhtyrtsev, the white-eyed man hisses one word: "Azazel".

The murder of Akhtyrtsev brings a great deal of attention to what had seemed a routine case. Fandorin gets a new boss, Ivan Brilling, a sophisticated detective familiar with modern investigative techniques. Brilling believes that the murder is the work of a terrorist organization called "Azazel" that is operating in Moscow. He sends Fandorin off to interview Lady Astair, whose Astair House has now acquired Akhtyrtsev's fortune along with Kokorin's, because both students left all their assets to Astair House after Amalia Bezhetskaya encouraged them to do so. Fandorin argues that this, at least in theory, gave Lady Astair a motive to want their deaths. However, at their meeting Lady Astair is helpful to Fandorin, who leaves her school convinced of her innocence and impressed by her charitable mission.

Next, Fandorin investigates Count Zurov. After Fandorin beats Zurov at cards, the count challenges him to a duel, but it turns out to be a practical joke on Fandorin, and the count befriends him. Zurov, believing Fandorin to be as much in love with Amalia as he is, and wishing that Fandorin will win her heart so that Zurov can let her go, reveals to Fandorin that she is staying at the Winter Queen Hotel in London.

Fandorin journeys to London, where he tracks down Bezhetskaya to a house in town. He sneaks into her room after she leaves it and finds a paper that appears to be a list of Azazel members all over the world, many of whom hold high ranks in government or the military. Fandorin is about to leave when Bezhetskaya catches him in her room. They struggle, a shot goes off in the dark, and Fandorin flees, believing that he has killed Amalia.

He has not, however, because Amalia and her henchmen kidnap Fandorin from his hotel room. Amalia leaves her henchmen to kill Fandorin, and they are about to do so when Count Zurov appears out of nowhere and saves Fandorin's life. Zurov admits to Fandorin that jealousy over Amalia led him to follow Fandorin to London. Fandorin assures Zurov that he is no rival for Amalia, and Zurov leaves to either kill her or "take her away somewhere".

Meanwhile, Fandorin hurriedly leaves for St. Petersburg to intercept the letter that Amalia has mailed to her Azazel contact there. He succeeds, and sees the letter delivered to Gerald Cunningham, a teacher at the Moscow Astair House. Fandorin reports this to Brilling, and they go together to arrest Cunningham—but Brilling shoots Cunningham dead, and reveals to Fandorin that he is also an agent of Azazel. Fandorin and Brilling struggle, and Brilling is killed.

Fandorin travels back to Moscow to continue the investigation. While on the way, he meets Elizaveta on the train, and finds out that she is as smitten by him as he is by her. Upon arrival in Moscow, he once again goes to see Lady Astair and asks her if she knows anything about Cunningham's activities with Azazel. While talking to Lady Astair, Fandorin suddenly realizes that Cunningham was too young to have started Azazel, and that Lady Astair is the real criminal mastermind.

Lady Astair confesses to Fandorin, admitting that she is the head of Azazel. She tells him that her Astair Houses are part of a plot to train bright young orphan boys to serve her and her group, which plans to eventually take over the world. She then tells one of her servants, the German professor Blank, to give Fandorin a lobotomy so that they may retrain him as a member of Azazel, but Fandorin escapes and confronts Lady Astair, who is waiting for him with a bomb. Lady Astair traps him with her, but after Fandorin begs for his life, she lets him go in return for a promise to not hunt down her "children" from the Astair Houses. Lady Astair then appears to commit suicide with her bomb.

Fandorin, however, is ordered to help the campaign to root out members of Azazel in Russia, which he does. His guilt at breaking his promise mars his happiness on the day of his wedding to Elizaveta. After the newly married couple retreat to their hotel suite, a messenger brings Fandorin a package. Fandorin walks to the window and sees the messenger frantically running into a carriage driven by the white-eyed assassin that earlier tried to kill Fandorin. Fandorin jumps out his window in an attempt to arrest the killer, and thus escapes the bomb, which blows up and kills his young bride. The novel ends with a dazed Fandorin walking the streets of Moscow, his hair having turned gray at the temples due to his shock over his wife's death.

== Genesis and reception ==
Boris Akunin is the pen name of Grigory Chkartishvili, a Russian writer and academic who also worked as a translator of Japanese literature into Russian. Chkartishvili conceived of a series of detective novels demonstrating each of the genres of detective fiction, of which Chkartishvili found 16. Thus the Erast Fandorin series is planned to run through 16 books. Fourteen books have been already published in Russia; The Winter Queen is the first of five that have been translated into English.

The Winter Queen was not an immediate success when it was published in 1998, selling six thousand copies. However, the fifth novel in the Fandorin series, Special Assignments, became a best-seller, as did all the other Fandorin novels thereafter.

== Adaptations ==
=== Film adaptations ===
Azazel was filmed for Russian television in 2002. Ilya Noskov starred as Fandorin, and Akunin adapted his own novel into a screenplay.

In 2007, Fyodor Bondarchuk was announced as the director of a potential English-language film version of Azazel, with Paul Verhoeven producing. The screenplay was written by Gerard Soeteman, with whom Verhoeven had frequently worked. Dan Stevens was cast in the role of Erast Fandorin and Milla Jovovich in the role of Amalia Bezhetskaya. Filming was first planned for summer 2007, but when Jovovich became pregnant, it was reported that production had been postponed. After the merger of GFM and Seven Arts, plans were announced to film The Winter Queen in August 2011. Filming locations were to be London, Saint Petersburg, and Babelsberg Studios in Berlin. The film never entered production.

=== Radio adaptation ===
Between October 13, 2003, and October 24, 2003, an abridged version was broadcast as the Book at Bedtime on BBC Radio 4, in 10, 15-minute parts.
