= Sigmund in a Cafe =

1993 short story by Victor Pelevin

- Author: Victor Pelevin
- Language: Russian
- Genre: Short story
- Publication date: 1993
- Publication place: Russia
- Media type: Print (Paperback)
- ISBN: 5-7027-0811-3

Sigmund in a Cafe (Russian: «Зигмунд в кафе») is a short story by Victor Pelevin, published in 1993.

== Plot ==
The story belongs to the early stage of the writer's work, and applies a characteristic author's trick: playing with the reader's expectations and unpredictable ending. A similar gimmick is found in his other works: "The Life of Insects", "Hermit and Six-Toes", "Nika".

The action of the story takes place in a Viennese café, judging by the description, the beginning of 20th century. A certain Sigmund sits in the café and closely observes the couples around him: a lady and a gentleman who have come to the café for dinner, a girl and a boy playing in the corner, a hostess and a waiter changing a blown bulb. The story details the details of each couple's behavior, and Sigmund comments on each episode with a short "Aha."

Each episode elicits a monotonous commentary from him, characterized only by a gradually increasing excitement as the episodes depicted contain sexual meaning and phallic details.

In Sigmund's field of vision are a couple of customers, a man and a woman, the hostess' children, a brother and sister, the hostess herself, and the waiter. To the first and subsequent episodes, Sigmund reacts with a quiet exclamation of "Aha." He sees the displeasure of the woman who has noticed the snow crammed into the unzipped handbag carried by her companion, the long umbrella that the lady has placed in the corner, "for some reason having turned its handle down."

Sigmund sees the children quarreling and the girl's tongue, which she showed to her brother and "held it out so long that it could probably be seen in every detail."

This is followed by a detailed description of the episode of changing a burned-out light bulb, in which the characters do not say a single word and exchange gestures.

The following episodes (blowing a long stream of tobacco smoke through tobacco rings, children playing with disheveled dolls and shapeless pieces of colorful plasticine) and seeing an avant-garde canvas on the wall, showing two open pianos "in which lay the dead Bunuel and Salvador Dali, both with oddly long ears," cause Sigmund to exclaim and worry: "Aha! – Sigmund shouted with all his might. – Aha! Aha!!! Aha!!!!".

After several such repetitions, the reader concludes that the visitor to the Vienna café is the founder of psychoanalysis, Dr. Sigmund Freud. And then the reader begins to interpret everyday life episodes in terms of Freudianism.

Sigmund draws everyone's attention to himself by his behavior. The hostess of the establishment approaches him, a man approaches him. It is only here, almost in the epilogue, that the reader is informed that Sigmund is a parrot. The space of the city and the café instantly narrows to the boundaries of the third spatial point, to the cage in which Sigmund is sitting. The cage is all crap, which does not please the hostess.

Thus, the reasoning to which the reader was provoked could not have been born in a bird's head.

The story is permeated with Nabokovian-type irony in relation to Freud and his theory of all-pervasive sexuality. At the end follows a phrase about the riddled cage in which Sigmund is to live – this is probably a mockery of the proponents of psychoanalysis.
