= Music from the Pillar =

1991 short story by Victor Pelevin

- Music from the Pillar or Музыка со столба in Russian
- Author: Victor Pelevin
- Language: Russian
- Genre: Short story
- Publication date: 1991
- Publication place: Russia
- Media type: Print (Paperback)
- ISBN: 5-85950-013-0

Music from the Pillar (Russian: «Музыка со столба») is a short story by Victor Pelevin, published in 1991.

== Plot ==
"Music from the Pillar" together with the stories "The Reconstructor", "Weapon of Retaliation" and "Kreger’s Revelation" constitute a single cycle of works in the alternative history genre. The plots of these stories overlap.

At the beginning of the story, the worker Matvey reads on a magazine page an account of an American physicist's ideas about the existence of points of space that are on different evolutionary lines, but are at the same time their intersection: "crossing over such a point will cause the event "B1" of area "A" to begin to occur instead of the event "A1" of area "B". But the event that occurred in area "A" will now be an event occurring in area "B." This quote describes the compositional structure of the story, where the protagonist's consciousness is divided, intertwining dream and reality.

Matvey, along with two colleagues, has a desire to drink vodka at the beginning of his work day, but since the store is closed and there is no money, they decide to expand their consciousness by eating fly mushrooms. Under the influence of mushrooms, the characters begin to hallucinate.

"Music from the Pillar" appears in Matvey's mind, after which "Something battered, mutilated and driven into the deepest and darkest corner of Matvey's soul stirred and crawled timidly toward the light, flinching and waiting to strike every minute. Matvey let this strange, incomprehensible thing fully emerge and now looked at it with an inner gaze, trying to understand what it was. Suddenly he noticed that this strange thing was himself and that it was looking at everything else that had just considered itself to be him and trying to make sense of what was just trying to make sense of him.

Then in the back room, the characters see a fragment of Seventeen Moments of Spring, and then they get into the back of a truck and drive to work. This is where the character's split consciousness occurs: Matvei becomes Himmler riding in an armored truck with Hitler, but at the same time he continues to be himself.

Pelevin argues that people tend to cling to reality. In Matthew's hallucinations, Hitler says, "...why are we so afraid of losing something, without even knowing what we are losing? Let burdocks be burdocks, fences be fences, and then the roads will have a beginning and an end, the road will once again have a meaning. So let us finally adopt a way of looking at things that will restore simplicity to the world, and that will enable us to live in it without the fear of the nostalgia that awaits us around every tomorrow's corner...".

"Music from the Pillar" echoes another of Pelevin's short stories, "Kreger's Revelation" where Himmler said, "Did you ever happen to dream that you were driving in the back of a rundown truck to some unknown place, and there were some monsters sitting around you?" Thus, the events of the story "Kreger's Revelation" could have been a hallucination by Matvei, or Matvei's trip could have been a dream by Himmler. Pelevin does not give an unequivocal answer to the question of which of the two stories is reality and which is a dream.
