= Empire V (film) =

- Directed by: Victor Ginzburg
- Written by: Victor Ginzburg; Victor Pelevin
- Based on: Empire V by Victor Pelevin
- Produced by: Alec Marianchi; Yuri Krestinsky; Jim Steel; Andrey Trubitsin; Victor Ginzburg; Maria Kapralova; Alexey Tylevich; Yulia Ilyina
- Starring: Pavel Tabakov; Taisiya Radchenko; Miron Fyodorov; Vladimir Dolinsky; Vera Alentova; Viktor Verzhbitsky; Bronislav Vinogrodsky; Igor Jijikine
- Cinematography: Aleksei Rodionov
- Edited by: Anton Anisimov; Sergey Nesterov; Irakli Kvirikadze
- Music by: Vladimir Martynov; Alexander Hake; Anna Drubich; Nikolai Skachkov
- Production companies: Heartland Films; Square Film Company; Cinema Fund
- Release date: 2023
- Running time: 114 minutes
- Country: Russia
- Languages: Russian, English
- Budget: ₽460 million

Empire V (Russian: Ампир V, romanized: Ampir V) is a 2023 Russian urban fantasy film directed by Victor Ginzburg, based on the novel of the same name by Victor Pelevin, and starring Pavel Tabakov as Rama II, a vampire apprentice, begins training to become a full-fledged vampire.

In the film, the image of the goddess Ishtar was copied from Alla Pugacheva, who for several decades was one of the main pop icons of show business in Russia and Eastern Europe.

== Plot ==
Set in contemporary Moscow, Empire V is a fantasy vampire love story and also functions as a satire of Russia's elite.

Roman, a 19-year-old nobody, ponders the choices that have made him one of life's losers. Lured by a street graffiti promising a better future, he is drugged and wakes in a glamorous mansion to find himself handcuffed and immobile. His captor is a vampire who must pass on his powers before committing suicide — the consequence of having lost a vampire duel. This process involves the transfer of a parasitic worm vampires call "The Tongue." Roman is to be the Tongue's new host and thereby a member of the secret elite who rule the world.

Roman is next confronted by Mithra, a mentor figure who seems rudely disinterested in his student. Mithra explains that Roman has been renamed Rama and that the Tongue is less parasite and more symbiotic passenger with objectives of its own. Rama also learns that vampires do not drink blood (which they call "Red Liquid") but when they sample it, via the Tongue, they absorb all the knowledge and experiences of the donor.

Sampling various Red Liquid extracts from great minds of the past, Rama is tutored in the twin disciplines of Glamour and Discourse, rhetorical devices designed by vampires to blind humanity to the hidden reality of the world by focusing their minds exclusively on the pursuit of financial wealth. In an sequence involving vampire kung fu, a high speed car chase through Moscow and a rubber sex doll, Rama is also trained in the arts of Combat and Love—two sides of the same coin, he is told. Experimenting with his new powers Rama learns it is time for his first bite of human prey. Stalking an attractive young woman in the street, the bite gives him access to her innermost memories and he thoroughly enjoys the experience of manipulating her into bed.

Beginning to doubt the ethics of his new life, Rama is told of the next stage in his education. He will participate in something called "The Great Fall" and will do so alongside a fellow initiate, Hera. Meeting Hera online, Rama sees that she is young, beautiful and as confused by her new life as he is by his. After tasting the mysterious liquid that is his invitation to The Great Fall, and reciting the words, "Into darkness, backwards and downwards!" Rama is able to assume a bat-like form and fly. Swooping across the glittering nighttime Moscow skyline he encounters Hera and soon they arrive at a deep cave on the outskirts of the city. Back in human form the young couple meet senior vampire Enlil, the equivalent of human management, he explains. Hera points out that Enlil looks just like a vampire from the movies, to which he replies that vampires all over the world regularly fund vampire movies...

== Cast ==
- Pavel Tabakov as Roman "Roma" Shtorkin, changes his name to Rama II
- Taisiya "Taya" Radchenko as Hera VIII
- Miron Fyodorov as Mithra VI, Hera VIII's curator
- Vladimir Dolinsky as Enlil
- Marina Zudina as Rama's mother
- Vera Alentova as Ishtar, goddess
- Viktor Verzhbitsky as Vaal
- Bronislav Vinogrodsky as Loki IX, teacher of martial arts and lovemaking
- Igor Jijikine as Baldr, glamour teacher
- Igor Gordin as Grigory, professor of theology
- Vladimir Epifantsev as Vavilen Tatarsky / Brahma XIV
- Fyodor Bondarchuk as Koldovashkin, head of discourse, professor

== Release ==
The novel was adapted into a film directed by Victor Ginzburg and starring Pavel Tabakov alongside Miron Fyodorov. It premiered at the Fantasia International Film Festival in July 2023. The Russian government refused to release a distribution permit for the film in 2022, effectively banning it in the country.

== Reception ==
Empire V has an approval rating of 83% on review aggregator website Rotten Tomatoes, based on 6 reviews, and an average rating of 6.8/10.
