= Batman Apollo =

Novel by Victor Pelevin

- First edition
- Author: Victor Pelevin
- Language: Russian
- Genre: Novel
- Publisher: Эксмо
- Publication date: 2013
- Publication place: Russia
- Media type: Print (Paperback)
- Pages: 512 pp
- ISBN: 978-5699634460

Batman Apollo (Russian: «Бэтман Аполло») is a novel by Victor Pelevin first published in 2013.

The novel is a sequel to Pelevin's 2006 vampire novel Empire V. The main character is the same – the young vampire Rama. The vampires in the novel feed on "bablos," which is a kind of metaphysical concentrate of money, and they fool people with the help of glamour and discourse. As the author writes: Glamour is sex expressed through money, discourse is sex that is lacking, expressed through money that is not.

== Plot ==
The novel established early on that vampires rule this world. Rama is a young vampire who has already mastered the vampire craft. He already knows the basics: he can stealthily bite a person's neck, and reveal all the secrets of that person's soul from the blood.

Trained as a diver, he plunges again and again into uncertainty, into the realm between life and death, and also meets the vampire, the eternal Dracula, who shares with him the secrets of this world.

Modern culture in general, the actual world order as a whole (both in Russian and Western variants) in Pelevin evoke a passionate aversion. In generalized form, the essence can be conveyed as follows. There is an elite in the world, more or less understanding the essence of the processes taking place (the vampires and the Chaldeans chosen from among the people serving them), and the rest of humanity. The elite control people with discourse (ideological twaddle) and glamour (the cultural contentlessness of consumer society). Simply put, by messing with the minds of the average person. The media, the Internet, computer games, and so on serve the same purpose.

The main intrigue of the novel is that in the Russian situation of social and legal disadvantage, these tools no longer work.

== Analysis ==
Some literary critics have marked this novel as Pelevin's most static novel; its characters-as always, rather symbols, functions, mediums for the transmission of ideas-do not experience any special adventures here, flying on webbed wings from dream to the postmortem "limbo" zone and from there to reality, which can also turn out to be dream or postmortem.

Along the way, various aspects of the illusory self and the endless cycle of desire as a cause of suffering are revealed to them - revealed, as usual, with lucid, sarcastic examples from today, up to the hashtags and the game "Call of Duty".

The protagonist of the novel chews up the typical route of the soul of the Pelevin hero - from fond memories of the blissful edges of childhood through the absurdity and curvature of the "desert of reality" to the exit from this world, dissolution in the "universal river of absolute love" - is broken here: souls have nothing to remember and nothing to hope for, they are doomed to wander in the maze of their own suffering, and this torture chamber has a name for the first time.

The text suggests that achieving the state of a smiling peasant is improbable, and notes that the author presents this collective farm outcome critically.

The individual evolution of the protagonist in this novel interests Pelevin more than the movements of the masses. As the story progresses, Rama gradually, without noticing it, begins to transform himself into a spontaneous revolutionary. He becomes nauseated by the blatant exploitative politics of the blood-sucking brothers, but the way back to the people who can still harbor illusions about their own ability to change things is closed to him.

In his scholastic dialogues with Dracula, Sophie, the Emperor and his mentor, the dying vampire Osiris, he follows the path that ordinary people sometimes experience when they begin to realize that they too are being used, that they too are being bled and that this will go on forever - until they themselves, having overcome laziness and inertia, say "enough.

In the finale, the novel's protagonist, a loner, a major, a narcissistic slacker, tormented by speculative questions, goes out on the square with a solitary picket, having previously put a balaclava on his head. He was a superman, and now he is a man.
