= Origin of Species (disambiguation) =

On the Origin of Species is a seminal book on evolutionary theory by Charles Darwin.

Origin of Species, The Origin of Species, or Origin of the Species may also refer to:

== Literature ==
- The Origin of Species (novel), or The Good Son, a 2016 novel by You-Jeong Jeong
- The Origin of Species, a 2008 novel by Nino Ricci
- "The Origin of Species" (short story), a 1993 story by Victor Pelevin
- Origin of the Species, an Amazing Spider-Man comics collection

== Other uses ==
- "The Origin of Species" (The Outer Limits), a television episode
- Origin of the Species, three compilation albums by Psychic TV, 1998–2002
- "Origin of Species", a song by Scale the Summit from The Collective, 2011

== See also ==
- "Original of the Species", a 2004 song by U2
