= The Art of Light Touches =

2019 Russian short story collection

- First edition (Russian)
- Author: Victor Pelevin
- Language: Russian
- Genre: Short stories
- Publication date: 2019
- Publication place: Russia
- Media type: Print (Paperback)
- Pages: 416 pp
- ISBN: 978-5-04-110738-3

The Art of Light Touches (Russian: «Искусство лёгких касаний») is a short story collection by Victor Pelevin, published in 2019 in Russia.

Some critics see this collection as a postmodern novel and, at the same time, a collection consisting of three, at first glance, not very related works-two novels, "Iakinf" and "The Art of Light Touch" and a story called "Stolypin".

"The Art of the Light Touch" as the author himself writes in a peculiar epigraph, whispers "a multicultural chorus of inner voices of different political views, beliefs, orientations, tendencies and identities, against which, according to the author's inner feeling, it would be more expensive to run. And in the elegantly mocking author's interpretation of this polyphonic whisper has the appropriate therapeutic effect with a slight anesthetic effect. Yes, life is an illusion, the gods of time and reason inevitably demand new victims, surfing has successfully replaced drug-trips, and a slight degree of intoxication is achieved in a couple of tweets. Perhaps all of Russia is a stolypin wagon, whether you have personal access to the deck or not.

== Plot ==
=== Iakinf ===
Four young guys – a TV journalist, a bank broker, a window fitter, and a sociologist with a euro emblem on his T-shirt – are looking for a change of impressions in the mountains (They met in Nepal on Latang – in the thin mountain air Russians get along with each other quickly and easily). They share a common hobby – trekking. The story is set in Kabardino-Balkaria on another hike.

A cab driver drops them off at the foot of the mountain, and while the group is walking up to their lodging at dusk, a gray-haired man with a beard, falsely humming Joe Dassin, rides his bicycle down to them. This man is their guide, Akinfy Ivanovich, with whom the boys will go into the mountains and whom they will persuade to tell their story on the way.

From lodge to lodge, like Scheherazade, Akinfy tells his story. At first it seems to the boys that the story is entirely made up and that Akinfy has no spiritual transformation. But towards the end of the trek, the friends begin to suspect that the route, the story he tells, and their own fate are all connected in a very close and rather sinister way.

=== The Art of Light Touches ===
The second novel is an ironic retelling of a fictional multi-page philosophical and erotic treatise by Masonic specialist K. P. Golgofsky, which investigates and exposes the universal conspiracy and reveals the essence of the new information war between Russia and America.

The internal plot is remotely reminiscent of "The Da Vinci Code". The philosopher Golgofsky was struck by the mysterious poisoning of his dacha neighbor, General Iziumov, and, seeking to find the cause of such a strange turn in the fate of a seemingly peaceful old man, he spins the chain of investigation.

The general was not just drinking tea in his bathrobe. He was touching a major mystery in the history of civilization.

The turning point is the end of the Middle Ages, when man's direct communication with God through intermediaries (in the olden days they were called Angels and messengers, Pelevin calls them "gargoyles") ceases. Instead of them comes again a two-horned lord, the same Saturn-Baal-Kronos, but he calls himself the Mind.

Mankind begins to intensively worship Reason (during the French Revolution of 1789, such a cult was actually established). And specifically governs this imaginary Reason with the help of chimeras. The chimera has replaced the former messengers.

Moving now to Kaliningrad, now to the Netherlands, now to Paris, now to Sukhumi, and finding more and more witnesses to the life and activities of General Iziumov, Golgofsky realizes that this old man ran a secret GRU office, which was engaged in the complex production of these chimeras. Aimed at America. And everything that has happened to America in the last 20 years is General Izumov's business, made much easier with the advent of social media.

=== Stolypin ===
A small story compared to The Art of Light Touch, just 50 pages long, literally continuing and complementing the plot of Pelevin's previous very successfully sold-out book, Secret Views of Mount Fuji.

The main characters of the story oligarchs Fedor Semenovich and Rinat Musayevich, in the last novel seeking for any money universal Buddhist happiness. Here they rediscover Russian Buddhism, with its "Tibetan" vernacular, its mantras and a set of rules for righteous living.

In their search, they reach the deepest Russian people – the thieves who are transported from one place of confinement to another in a special railroad car, ironically called "stolypin" after the tsar's progressivist minister.
