= Weapon of Retaliation =

1990 short story by Victor Pelevin

- Short story by Victor Pelevin
- Language: Russian

Publication
- Publication date: 1990
- Publication place: Russia
- Media type: Print (Paperback)

"Weapon of Retaliation" (Russian: «Оружие возмездия») is a short story by Victor Pelevin, published in 1990.

== Plot ==
Pelevin's story forms a cycle of works together with the stories "The Reconstructor", "Kreger's Revelation" and "Music from the Pillar" the plots of which overlap. Not infrequently, elements of the plot of some stories in the cycle are contained in a convoluted form in others. The stories receive a continuation or are given a backstory within the general artistic world of the characters.

The title of the story is taken from a series of projects of Nazi Germany under the general title "Weapon of Retaliation" to develop a new type of weapon to turn the tide of World War II. The beginning does list the various projects that existed, then the story moves into the realm of dystopian fiction, how the Allies sought weapons of retaliation, how Stalin used blatant threats against the British and Americans, suspected deception, and so on.

Just as in life, no weapons were found. But the author argues that weapons did in fact exist and were even used, namely psychological weapons in the form of rumors of a formidable weapon of retaliation: "as rumors of a weapon of retaliation emerge and spread, they arise by themselves."

In conclusion, the author refers to the results of the use of weapons against the USSR, "although we can do without words, especially as they are bitter and not new". To see the results of the weapon, it is enough to go to the window in the morning on tiptoe, slightly open the curtain and look out the window.

In the story, the Weapon of Retaliation itself is constructed out of many metaphors, although it is initially physically absent. However, it begins to manifest itself as a result of collective faith. Existing only in people's minds, the Weapon of Retaliation begins to fulfill its function of destroying or altering reality.

Reflecting on the principles of balance, the narrator cites the example of the candle and the mirror: if somehow the reflection of the candle is placed in the mirror, it should materialize in front of the mirror. However, it is impossible to do this. Propaganda, however, is capable of creating a simulacrum, which will eventually generate its "reflected", i.e. the original.

The choice of a metaphor to replace the missing name of the weapon of death somewhat narrows the limitless field of interpretive variations, objectifying the idea of something that cannot have a visual image, because it does not exist even as an "idea.

For example, likening the weapons to the spear of Wotan implied the appearance of projectiles of incredible power, the metaphor "Siegfried's sword" prompted thoughts of a bomb, and the message that "the fire-eyed Valkyries of the Reich are about to unleash their holy madness on the aggressor" generated associations with rays or psychic gas.

The text of the story is an attempt by the author to conduct a study of the peculiarities of the course of cognitive processes in the collective consciousness of an entire nation (the German nation of the Third Reich). The work subtly and pseudoscientifically actualizes and explores the theme of the linguistic conditionality of consciousness and the role of the subject in determining the degree of reality of objects of reality.
