= Ivan Kublakhanov =

1994 short story by Victor Pelevin

- Author: Victor Pelevin
- Language: Russian
- Genre: Short story
- Publication date: 1994
- Publication place: Russia
- Media type: Print (Paperback)
- ISBN: 5-300-00509-6

Ivan Kublakhanov (Russian: «Иван Кублаханов») is a short story by Victor Pelevin, published in 1994.

== Plot ==
The story is a postmodern philosophical treatise written in the traditions of Buddhism and Vedanism.

Having a traditional Russian name Ivan, the last name of the hero of the story - Kublakhanov refers to Coleridge's poem "Kubla Khan: or, A Vision in a Dream: A Fragment". The author addresses the idea of illusory existence and the existence of the soul in a multitude of bodily reincarnations. The story is also based on the Indian myth of Brahma and the creation of the universe: Brahma sleeps on a golden egg, from which the universe is born when he wakes up and dies out when he falls asleep.

At the beginning of the story, a certain impersonal absolute finds that something is beginning to happen in it, even though nothing is supposed to and cannot happen in it. A kind of mysterious birth of the world from some primordial "cosmic egg. In the end, it realizes that it is simply dreaming a dream that comes from "its infinite power over being," one of those dreams that "it has always dreamed.

This idea is precisely the Vedantic idea of an impersonal Brahman, as a "divine play" in infinite periodic succession, producing and then destroying the illusory world that is actually a dream.

The reader of the story realizes quite quickly that he is being described the feelings and reflections of a fetus developing in the mother's womb. The development that began from zero, as if from nothingness, begins to be realized by the powerful limitless consciousness of the Brahman, which, by some miracle, is at the same time the consciousness of the fetus growing in the mother's womb. Conscious of himself as a developing, growing being, Brahman knows that he sees a dream, and he is especially aware of this, awakening, from time to time (at the moment when the fetus apparently falls asleep), from it completely.

The awakened Brahman sees the truth and knows directly that he is one and the same, and multiplicity is only an illusion of a confused and fantastic dream, so according to Pelevin, living people are only part of reality, namely an illusory reality, a reality that exists only as a dream of Brahman, that is, unreal. Therefore any individual is unreal, his fears and thirst for immortality are unreal.

The reader is encouraged by Plevin to think about the following questions: what is the nature of consciousness and its relation to physical reality, first of all the body? From the moment when time appears, the experience of the future Ivan Kublakhanov has been accumulated in relation to the surrounding world. With the experience of relating to the world, consciousness emerges and acquires its own meaning.

Human reality is treated as a distressing dream from which one must awaken. After awakening from the dream (physical death), and finding himself in his true reality, the hero forgets that he was once Ivan Kublakhanov.

After being in the human form and the cessation of material existence, Ivan Kublakhanov is absorbed into the primordial, unformed inner consciousness, which in its turn becomes the new Koblakhan.
