= Crystal World (short story) =

1991 short story by Victor Pelevin

- Short story by Victor Pelevin
- Country: Russia
- Language: Russian

Publication
- Media type: Print (Paperback)
- Publication date: 1991

"Crystal World" (Russian: «Хрустальный мир») is a short story by Victor Pelevin, published in 1991.

== Plot ==
All the events of the story are read in a phantasmagoric way.

The story is based on real events, as evidenced by the date put at the beginning of the narrative: October 24, 1917. It was at that time, at night, that the Bolsheviks seized power in Russia, overthrowing the Provisional Government.

The heroes of the story, Nikolai Muromtsev and Yuri Popovich (persons fictionalized), are sent on night duty to prevent Lenin and his associates from entering Smolny. Attention should be drawn to the names of these cadets, which refer the reader to the epic Russian heroes Ilya Muromets and Alyosha Popovich, who back in the day faithfully defended the borders of the Russian land. Like these bogatyrs, Nikolai and Yuri, although they occasionally snort cocaine, which brings them closer to our contemporaries, who in the 1990s lived in an "inverted consciousness" provoked by drugs and alcohol, perform the function of defenders of a rolling Russia into the abyss, trying at a new historical turn to save and preserve the illusory "crystal world", personifying "the past known past of Russia and its unknown future". The fact that there is no third protector, Dobryny Nikitich, among these decadent bogatyrs "gives rise to the omnipotence of chance in Pelevin's Crystal World.

On the eve of the October Revolution in Petrograd, cadets Nikolai and Yuri are on duty on Shpalernaya Street with the main task of not letting anyone into the Smolny. The cadets are on duty, taking various drugs and having philosophical conversations, constantly interrupted by attempts of unknown persons to pass to Smolny.

Along the way, Yuri, one of the Junkers, explains to the other that every man has a mission, which may be unexpected for himself. When asked how to discover his mission, Yuri reveals that he once listened to lectures by Rudolf Steiner, the founder of the religious-mystical teachings of anthroposophy. Steiner revealed to Yuri that he had a special mark on him, that he had a special mission in his destiny: to protect the world from an ancient demon.

Gradually it turns out that the Bolshevik leader Vladimir Lenin himself is trying to break into Smolny. And so, once again, as the Junkers suffer the consequences of taking ephedrine, they let in worker Eino Reichy ostensibly with a shipment of lemonade from the firm Karl Liebknecht & Sons. In fact, the historical event in question is how the Finnish Communist Eino Rahja escorted Lenin to the Smolny in St. Petersburg during the October Revolution in Russia.

In so doing, the Junkers have failed in their mission, and the ancient demon takes possession of Russia.

Pelevin creates a new reality in the story. It helps to see and realize the images of Alexander Blok and references to the works of cultural and historical heritage. And this reality is that it is impossible to save the "crystal world" due to its fragility and transparency, and hence its fragility. Therefore, this world, beautiful in its purity, must perish, shattering, like glass, into small pieces.
