= One Vogue =

2003 short story by Victor Pelevin

- Author: Victor Pelevin
- Language: Russian
- Genre: Short story
- Publication date: 2003
- Publication place: Russia
- Media type: Print (Paperback)
- ISBN: 5-699-03491-9

One Vogue (Russian: «Один вог») is a short story by Viktor Pelevin, published in 2003.

== Plot ==
The story "One Vogue" is in the form of a terminological definition, with the term itself on the left side and a definition, that is, a verbal expression that reveals the essence of the term being defined, on the right side.

The story is structured as an argument about the comparative characteristics of three female visitors to a restaurant in the center of Moscow, who happened to cross paths in the women's restroom room. The unit of measurement of these women, which allows us to evaluate and compare them in relation to each other, is "One Vogue".

By "One Vogue" is meant the amount of "futility" allocated to each of the girls. Literally, in Russian the word vanity means the absence of meaning, value in anything, uselessness, vanity, futility.

As a physical phenomenon, futility is thought by Pelevin to be measurable, and the author introduces a special quantitative qualifier "vogue".

The principle of nomination of this qualifier refers the reader of the story to the process of naming the units of measurement in physics, a significant part of which are named after the scientists-physicists: Ohm - (Georges Ohm), Ampere - (Andre Amper), Newton - (Isaac Newton), Hertz - (Henry Hertz), Volt - (Alessandro Volta), etc.

The unit of electric charge mentioned in the epigraph is named after the French physicist Charles Coulomb. The name of the unit of measure of futility is also motivated by a proper name, but formed not from an anthroponym, but from the name of one of the most famous and authoritative periodicals in the fashion world, the magazine "Vogue".

Vogue and similar publications not only determine the style of clothing and various accessories, they dictate styles of behavior, entertainment, ideas, interiors, literature, taste preferences, and even a certain lifestyle. Since fashion trends are always time-limited and characterized by a periodic change of role models, any human action that is reduced to striving to follow fashion prescriptions has no true value, that is, it is futile.

The volume of information and pragmatic attitudes contained in a single issue of Vogue served as the basis for measuring futility and allocating a special unit of measurement.

Also noteworthy is the fact that in the story the idea of clothing as a form of communication is traced on the example of corporate forms, branded clothing brands, which have their own language and carry certain messages. The main characters of the story draw conclusions about each other for a fraction of a second without saying a word. The generalizing concepts for them are brands: Armani, Gucci, Prada, Burberry, Brabus.
