= Built-in Reminder =

Short story by Viktor Pelevin, published in 1991

- Author: Victor Pelevin
- Language: Russian
- Genre: Short story
- Publication date: 1991
- Publication place: Russia
- Media type: Print (Paperback)
- ISBN: 5-85950-013-0

Built-in Reminder (Russian: «Встроенный напоминатель») is a short story by Victor Pelevin, published in 1991. The story was the title of a collection of stories of the same name published in 2002.

== Plot ==
The story is a monologue and reflection of a painter of modern art.

At an exhibition of modern art, the painter Niksim Skolpovsky talks about a new direction, "vibrationalism". The lecture is attended by several elderly female workers of the Burevestnik factory, who probably got there by accident. As an example of a work of vibrationalism, he demonstrates a simulacrum of a human being, "a mannequin with a remote eliminator and a built-in death reminder. This mannequin is assembled "from a multitude of random objects pulled together by thin wires.

When the saw's blade, located near the head, is turned on, it begins to cut one by one the wires, which causes the dummy to disintegrate. Simultaneously with the beginning of the saw's work the bell - a reminder of death - was also turned on.

At the end of the lecture Niksim Skolpovsky says: "The built-in reminder warned of impending death, but could the mannequin hear it ringing? And even if he could, did he understand its meaning? This is what vibrationalism invites us to ponder.

During the lecture, the elderly women in attendance begin to gradually shrink and at the end become no more than specks of dust. Niksim sweeps up these dust particles with a broom and pours them into an envelope. And if the mannequin, which embodies the virtual corporeality, is "resurrected," that is, restored as a permanent exhibit, then the physical corporeality of the visitors is reduced to ashes. Thus, in the fictional "vibrationalism" the author has encoded the philosophy of Zen Buddhism.

At the end of the story, Nixim thinks about a sore root tooth. Although he has the power to reduce people to the size of dust particles, he cannot cope with his own toothache. He, too, finds himself in the role of a dummy, unable to understand that the toothache is a reminder of his own death.

The second point, mocked humorously by the author, is that the audience at the exhibition does not understand at all what the artist Niksim Skolpovsky is saying to them, which is generally typical of most contemporary art exhibitions.

The author himself plays with ideas and terms, while slightly mocking his readers. It is very reminiscent of his own statement: "Being forced by the nature of my occupations to meet a lot of heavy idiots from literary circles, I have developed the ability to participate in their conversations without really thinking about what they are talking about, but freely juggling with ridiculous words like 'realism', 'theurgy' or even 'theosophical coke'. In Chapaev's terminology, this meant learning the language spoken by the masses. And he himself, as I understood it, didn't even bother to know the words he spoke."
