= Kreger's Revelation =

Short story by Victor Pelevin, published in 1991

Kreger’s Revelation
- Author: Victor Pelevin
- Language: Russian
- Genre: Short story
- Publication date: 1991
- Publication place: Russia
- Media type: Print (Paperback)
- ISBN: 5-85950-013-0

Kreger’s Revelation (Russian: «Откровение Крегера») is a short story by Victor Pelevin, published in 1991.

== Plot ==
The story, together with the stories "The Reconstructor", "Weapon of Retaliation" and "Music from the Pillar" constitute a kind of cycle of pseudo-historical stories by Pelevin devoted to ideology, agitation and propaganda during World War II. It is written in a satirical pseudo-historical form.

In the story the author makes an attempt to fictionalize history. Formally, this work - the official correspondence (the reader sees reports, memos, minutes, transcripts of tape recordings) between the Reichsfuhrer SS Heinrich Himmler, the junior imperial magician Kreger, chief restructurer Wolf and other figures of the Third Reich. The reports, memos, protocols, transcripts of tape recordings are presented in the form of a mystical beginning, which guided the highest Nazi command made the most important decisions during the World War II.

The story literally interprets the title of Lenin's work "Leo Tolstoy as a mirror of the Russian Revolution". At first, Kreger sees Leo Tolstoy in the astral with a medical mirror on his forehead, then it turns out that a huge reflector was built in the Yasnaya Polyana area and Tolstoy's collected works were published with varying numbers of each volume to guide and focus the spiritual-mystical mirror. From the reconstruction of Leo Tolstoy's "mirror" (an allusion to the German organization of the Third Reich - Ahnenerbe), the conclusion that Italy must attack Abyssinia follows.

In Pelevin's dreamed up mystical system of Molotov and Kaganovich, on the basis of which Soviet Russia is ruled, the sacred Russian text of Lenin, which the chief magician of the Third Reich deciphers and especially its title, is given great importance in Nazi Germany. Initially Stalin (presumably Serob Nalbandian replaced him during the war) and his entourage accepted the thesis of Kaganovich, who argued that this sacred phrase of Lenin should be understood literally. This attitude entails the following conclusion: by manipulating the mirror reflecting the Russian revolution, it is possible to move its reflection to any other state, which will lead, according to the laws of sympathetic connection, to a similar revolution in the selected country.

All of the "crazy" theories set forth in the official documentation are also, to avoid an unambiguous reading, discredited by Ernst's account of Kreger and Wolfe drinking with Soviet defectors for two weeks.

The story ends with the fact that for his astral heroism, the management of Anenerbe asks that Kreger be awarded the Knight's Cross of the first degree with oak leaves.
