= The Life and Adventure of Shed Number XII =

1991 short story by Victor Pelevin

- Author: Victor Pelevin
- Language: Russian
- Genre: Short story
- Publication date: 1991
- Publication place: Russia
- Media type: Print (Paperback)
- ISBN: 5-85950-013-0

The Life and Adventure of Shed Number XII (Russian: «Жизнь и приключения сарая Номер XII») is a short story by Victor Pelevin, published in 1991.

== Plot ==
In the story, the author reveals the anthropomorphic essence of objects that can think and suffer. The protagonist, shed number XII, undergoes an inner evolution leading to spiritual freedom and partially obtains answers to questions about the meaning of life.

The protagonist of the story is shed, who undergoes an inner evolution that leads him to the spiritual freedom that allows him to realize his cherished dream of transformation. Shed's lifelong dream is to become a bicycle.

He likes the feeling most of all, the source of which were bicycles, he realized this in his early childhood, when he was not yet a shed, but a set of planks.

Sometimes, on a hot summer day, when everything around him hushed up, the shed would secretly identify itself with a folding Kama or Sputnik (brands of bicycles popular in the USSR) and experience happiness.

In this state he could find himself fifty kilometers away from his present location and ride, for example, across a deserted bridge over a canal in concrete banks or along the lilac shoulder of a heated highway, turning into tunnels formed by bushes sprouting around a narrow dirt path, so that, after riding over them, he could take another road leading to the forest, through the forest, and then resting on the orange stripes above the horizon. He could probably drive it for the rest of his life, but he didn't want to, because that was what made him happy.

Spiritual perfection, natural giftedness, subtle inner organization of the main character in the perception and understanding of the world around him lead him to the realization of the long-awaited dream. Thus death in the story is understood as a peculiar step in achieving spiritual freedom, the beginning of true and real life.

It is noteworthy that in this case Pelevin's hero becomes an inanimate object - the shed. The object is inanimate, far from poetic, however the author endows it with the possibility not only to think, but also to dream, that is not simply spiritualizes, but creates a model of a thinking and deep being.

Choosing a point of reference not a living entity, but endowing a crude object with life, Pelevin thereby accentuates the idea of the unity of the living and non-living world, expanding the boundaries of the familiar surrounding society, including into it those entities and objects that were usually outside the limits of average everyday consciousness.

Pelevin's world turns out to be more capacious and more meaningful, and his characters themselves become sources of eternity, its signs and creators.

The basic principles of the Buddhist doctrine to which Pelevin appeals open to his hero the way to the truth, and, subject to prolonged further efforts in this direction, to the ultimate goal of the Buddhist beliefs. The composition and plot of the story are built in the tradition of the fairy tale: the heroes are inanimate beings who are endowed with the ability to think and reason like humans, and in the finale there is a long-awaited transformation into fairy tale magic. Along with this, however, the metaphor and philosophical focus of the narrative somewhat transform the fairy tale in terms of genre and give the text a parable rather than a fairy tale proper. The life description of the main character is an answer to the question about the meaning of existence.
