= The Caretaker (Pelevin novel) =

2015 novel by Victor Pelevin

- First edition
- Author: Victor Pelevin
- Language: Russian
- Genre: Novel
- Publisher: Эксмо
- Publication date: 2015
- Publication place: Russia
- Media type: Print (Paperback)
- Pages: 347+349 pp
- ISBN: 978-5-699-83417-4

The Caretaker (Russian: «Смотритель») is a novel by Victor Pelevin first published in 2015. The novel consists of two books.

In the first volume of the novel, the protagonist was frightened that he was a ghost. In the second, he resigned himself to the idea that he was a dream watching himself.

The literary critic of the newspaper Kommersant, thus described the novel. Pelevin does not deviate one bit from his Jesuit rhythm, repeated over and over in his recent works. The hero's birth and training (15 pages) - initiation (20 pages) - the woman (12 pages) - initiation again, initiation into the higher caste (22 pages) - the story of the creation of the world (20 pages) - the unveiling and destruction of the world (50-60 pages). The author works like clockwork in this sense.

== Plot ==
Emperor Paul I, the great alchemist and mesmerist, was not assassinated by the conspirators-the coup was a spectacle that allowed him to leave St. Petersburg unnoticed. Paul the Alchemist departed for the new world created by the genius of Franz Anton Mesmer - Idyllium. Paul became its first Caretaker. For three centuries Idyllium has been hiding in the shadows of our world, interacting with it according to special laws. It is up to the Caretakers to protect Idyllium, and there have been many of them. Each new one must learn the secret of Idyllium and understand who he is.

Pelevin took as his hero a historical figure as far removed from actuality as possible: the Emperor Paul I. His consciousness turned out to be able to organize a ramified, detailed, stable illusion, to populate it with characters, events and everyday life, history - "Illusium" turned out. That is, almost all the action of the novel takes place literally "in the head" of the emperor. And the reader, who takes what is happening at face value, is also at this point co-authors as well as participants in the Illusion. We obediently support it with our reading energies. The metaphor here is transparent. We can guess whose, shall we say, inner world Pelevin is alluding to: the Emperor Paul, Mikhailovsky Castle, St. Petersburg... There are too many coincidences to consider this a portrait of any statesman. Let us put it this way - this is "the inner world of a generalized Russian statesman", which, in general, has changed little over 200 years.

It is interesting to read the author's thoughts on women's beauty. Unpleasantness is always easy to describe, Pelevin writes, but the beauty - it is impossible, only by stating: "it is beautiful". Why is this so? Why do we essentially have no words to describe beauty? Because beauty is the absence of defects, that is, in essence, nothing.

At the end of the novel the reader falls into a trap constructed by the author, the climax of every Plevin novel. When he finds himself in the position of the hero, who is also confused and no longer knows where is the illusion and where is reality, and what in general is illusion and how it differs from reality, and so on.
