= The Sacred Book of the Werewolf =

Novel by Victor Pelevin

- Author: Victor Pelevin
- Language: Russian
- Genre: Novel
- Publication date: 2004
- Publication place: Russia
- English publication date: 2008
- Media type: Print (Paperback)
- Pages: 336 pp
- ISBN: 0670019887

The Sacred Book of the Werewolf (Russian: «Священная книга оборотня ») is a novel by Victor Pelevin first published in Russian in 2004 and 2008 in English.

This book is in the great Russian tradition of social satire running from Gogol through to Bulgakov, according to the journalists of The Guardian. In this satirical, erotic allegory of the post-Soviet and post-9/11 world, Victor Pelevin gives new meaning to the words "unreliable narrator", according to the journalists of The New York Times.

== Plot ==
This novel is the story of a former fox-woman called A Huli. The female model she represents is one of the few in Pelevin's novels to escape her usual sarcastic irony. The narration is conducted from a feminine point of view, that of A Huli. Her feelings of love are described with tenderness. She is smarter and more sensitive than her male partners. The mystery of her attraction to Pelevin remains intact, despite the differences she presents in comparison to the heroines of her other novels.

The motif of the animal-woman is frequent in Pelevin's novels. The short stories in The Life of Insects and the present work The Sacred Book of the Werewolf are two examples. This motif does not devalue the gaze towards the woman but makes it more original. It also helps to translate the idea that woman is never what she appears at first sight, that she has a double nature, that she is a mystery. Pelevine likes in Buddhism and oriental mythologies the role of the female deities rivaling the male deities but possessing more power than the latter.

The fox-woman also evokes the Chinese mythology in which she is called Huli jing (in traditional Chinese: 狐狸精). In the traditional tales and legends of Japan she is called Kitsune.

In Pelevin's novel she is an immortal spirit who reincarnates into a luxury prostitute, in Moscow, in the 1990s, after the dissolution of the USSR. Always precise in his details, the writer lends both human female and animal features to his heroine. She wears stiletto heels, but gives free rein to her instincts as a hen-hunter. She is asexual, without a reproductive system. But her clients are deceived mainly because she manages to suggest, in the form of a hallucination, a sexual relationship that does not take place. She is of a rare beauty, because of her delicacy and the color of her hair, with very small breasts. But her main attribute is her red tail which can become more or less large in the same way as the phallus of a man, depending on the sexual hallucination to be provoked. At times during the story, we can see androgynous characteristics in her image, but it is rather, a superior form of human being that allows her to use her beauty to achieve a form of hyper sexuality. We can see the superman of which Nietzsche speaks, realized in a woman.

According to some literary critics, the novel is one of Pelevin's best-regarded love stories. The relationship between the two main characters, A Huli and a young FSB general who is also a werewolf, is set against the backdrop of widespread poverty and the breakdown of the established way of life in Russia.

The feminine principle of wisdom, of the soul of the world takes the form here of the sexual energy on which A Huli feeds to live eternally.

== Soundtrack ==
The first edition of the novel in Russia was accompanied by a disc with a soundtrack of songs, which throughout the book hears the main character of the novel A Huli.

1. 梦驼铃 meng tuo ling — Chinese song "Mantolin" (literally - Hearing camel bells in a dream).
2. Herminia — Filosofia.
3. Добрая ночь — Archdeacon Roman (Tamberg) and Priest Alexei Grachev (album "Sea of Life" (2002)).
4. Shocking Blue — I'll Follow the Sun.
5. Santocas — Valodia.
6. Sally Yeh — Lai Ming Bat Yiu Loi (/ Chinese Ghost Story 1).
7. Leslie Cheung — ? ( Chinese Ghost Story 2).
8. Carlos Puebla — Un nombre.
9. Trịnh Công Sơn — (Vietnamese: Vũ Thanh Xuân).
10. Choir of All Saints, Honiara — Jisas Yu Holem Blong Mi.
11. Nat King Cole — Quizas, Quizas, Quizas.
