= S.N.U.F.F. =

2011 novel by Viktor Pelevin

- First edition (publ. Эксмо)
- Author: Victor Pelevin
- Language: Russian
- Genre: Cyberpunk, Post-apocalyptic
- Publisher: Эксмо
- Publication date: 1 December 2011
- Publication place: Russia

S.N.U.F.F. is a science fiction novel by Russian writer Victor Pelevin published in 2011.

== Plot ==
The plot's setting is a post-apocalyptic world where the majority of people live either in a poor, technologically backwards Urkaina [sic] (likely—a combination of Ukraine with a Russian word urka (career criminal)) with about 300 million Russian speaking inhabitants with a capital city "Slava" or in a technologically advanced artificial flying city "Big Byz" (or "Byzantium") which is locked in the sky above Urkaina and has a population of about 30 million, where English is used only as a Church language, Russian is used for regular communication.

The book invents a set of neologisms (mainly using English even in the Russian original) such as discourse monger - a provoker paid by Big Byz media and military who under disguise of defending human rights against Urkainian dictatorship (which is in fact covertly controlled by Big Byz), provokes a conflict, which usually leads to regularly repeated "wars" - organized slaughter and bombing campaigns by Big Byz's fused military and media against virtually weaponless Urkaine's people. Such "wars", thoroughly filmed and used for entertainment, are organized nearly every year, the perpetrators from the Big Byz side being porn stars wearing suits of Batman or Ninja Turtles rather than soldiers, and protected by flying drones from any damage. The resulting footage is called "S.N.U.F.F.", an acronym from "Special Newsreel/Universal Feature Film", and sold both in Big Byz and in Urkaina.

The story is narrated from the person of one Damilola Karpov, a pilot of a remotely controlled drone which is equipped with both a camera and multiple weapons including guns and bombs. He works for both the military and media and his usual work in peacetime is to broadcast poverty, brutality and chaos from Urkaina to confirm the barbaric and totalitarian nature of this people, called "Orcs" in the slang of Big Byz, and their authorities. In other cases he protects discourse mongers with the guns of his drone so that they can denigrate and provoke Urkainian officials safely.

Another invented term is smart free speech, a term used to denote intelligent following (or even predicting) of current political trends by Big Byz media employees in order to earn good money and avoid being ostracized.

The people of Big Byz are not living in paradise either. It turns out that a popular custom among Big Byz elite and pilots is to use robotic women as sexual partners. Sex and pornography with persons under 46 is prohibited due to age of consent, and according to the narrative it is planned to increase it up to 48 due to a lobby of aging porn stars and feminists. Still, having sex with people under 46 isn't a big problem due to the hypocritical rule don't look, don't see; only doing (as well as watching) it in public is punished.

The naturally-decreasing population of Big Byz is usually replenished with immigrants from Urkaine and by child-buyers who go to poor Urkainian villages to buy babies. The rich immigrants from "Urkaine" to Big Byz usually live in a virtual "London" which is nothing more than a 3D picture of London (a parallel with Russian oligarchs) landscape that can be installed in any apartment for good money and is considered most prestigious (while there are other landscapes that can be installed for free).

As the story progresses, Damilola's sex toy elopes with a young orc named Grym, and he loses his drone in pursuit. His personal doom is accompanied by an impending global disaster, as the people of Urkaina sabotage the ground facilities of Big Byz.

== Utopia or dystopia ==
Pelevin’s story employs the genre patterns and clichés that emerged in the late twentieth century within dystopian literature. The fictional space is an enclosed whole, divided into two realms: the lower world, surrounded by marshes and a vast desert, and the upper world, Byzantium or Offshore, an artificially spherical structure suspended above an urban landscape, entirely isolated from the natural environment.

Instead of utopian didacticism, irony remains at the forefront of the narrative. The seemingly contrapuntal worlds of Byzantium and the Urkaganate are, in fact, identical in their essential characteristics. The only distinction lies in the upper world’s technical sophistication, which grants its inhabitants the comfort absent in the lower realm. Yet in both spheres, fundamental needs, sex, food, and security, are strictly regulated. The upper world conceals this regulation beneath refinement, while the lower world makes it explicit. In either case, there is no genuine individualistic rebellion against the system.

Damilola serves multiple roles throughout the novel: as narrator-excursor, he introduces the structure of both worlds; as propologist and critic, he exposes the system’s mechanisms. Grym, the protagonist, functions as a naïve clerk, perceiving reality with relative impartiality. Their perspectives intersect, complement, and illuminate one another.

As the narrative develops, Damilola becomes critical of the system. He experiences an epiphany, dares a belated protest, and reveals the system’s human dimension. Grym, by contrast, undergoes initiation and comes to recognize the futility of a reality once idealized by both humans and orcs as the embodiment of a dream of earthly perfection.

While Damilola remains confined within his private world, embodying the ideology of a typical Byzantine citizen, prejudiced and conditioned by postindustrial civilization, Grym pursues truth and the meaning of existence. He resembles the archetypal hero of an anti-utopia, embarking on a spiritual quest. Grym ultimately breaks free from both the hollow artificiality of Offshore and the closed, stagnant Urkaganate, embodied in the Circus, which symbolizes entrapment and spatial hopelessness.

Whereas classical twentieth-century utopias often measured value by the presence or absence of society and freedom, Pelevin’s novel posits a different organizing principle: pleasure, quantified in monetary terms, governs both the upper and lower worlds.

== Translations ==
- The book was translated into English by Andrew Bromfield.
- The book was translated into Lithuanian by Dalia Saukaitytė.

== Links ==
- Masha Boston. CHURCH-AMERICAN IN VIKTOR PELEVIN'S SNUFF // Transcultural Studies, 6-7 (2010-2011), 141-155.
