= Macedonian Criticism of French Thought =

Novella by Victor Pelevin

Macedonian Criticism of French Thought is a novella by Victor Pelevin, presented in his DPP(NN) book in 2003.

== Plot ==
Nasykh Nasratullovich Nafikov, also known as Kika, the protagonist, is a son of a well-known oil baron. (In the Russian language, his first, patronymic, and last name are derived from invectives.) Kika was born in Russia, but grew up and got his education in Europe. After his dad's passing away, Kika, received inheritance, becomes a wealthy man.

The result of Kika's mostly philosophic education was obtaining a hate-coloured obsession with French philosophy. Kika, considering himself a great thinker, starts publishing pseudophilosophical works, primarily opposing the great French philosophers: "Where did Baudrillard screw up", "Derrida from a pond" et cetera. His works receive controversial reviews.

The most famous Kika's work is called Macedonian Criticism of French Thought, where he expounds his idee fixe, developed by that time. The gist of this belief is as follows: after a man's death, a form, called 'humanoil', remains, in which man's will and suffering, put in his lifetime labour, keep on existing. Humanoil objectifies itself in a circulating commodity-money form. After Soviet Union's demise, communistic humanoil began to flow to the West, which keeps on until now. Drawing parallels between different oil grades, suitable or not suitable for a technological process, Kika comes to the conclusion that the West receives inadequate sort of humanoil; according to him — 'a poisonous purulence'. So, Kika sees his mission in putting an obstacle to the Russian humanoil flow, and also in drawing off a part of humanoil back to Russia.

In order to get that done, Kika rents a factory near Paris, where people are physically abused while reading passages from Michel Foucault's book Discipline and Punish. This became known to Interpol, but Kika manages to escape retribution. His further fate is unknown; what is clear is that he is alive, making statements in the press about the crushing defeat of the French philosophical thought.

In this story, Pelevin attempts to overcome the crisis of the genre of postmodernism by recognizing the "extremes" of the style and by "undermining" its theoretical and artistic attitudes.

The story mocks the "sacral" mythological sources, the works of the recent masters of thought. It demonstrates the mystical impossibility of the philosophical works, their almost sacral immutability. However, this is related, as the reader suspects, to the lack of clarity in their theoretical constructions: "In the case of Jean Baudrillard, all affirmative propositions can be changed into negative ones without any damage to their meaning. Furthermore," the author goes on, "it is possible to substitute all realistic words for those that are the opposite of the meaning, again without any consequence. And even more: you can do these operations at the same time, in any sequence, or several times in succession, and the reader will not notice the change again. But Jacques Derrida, a true intellectual would agree, dives deeper and doesn't dive any farther. If it is still possible to change the meaning of a statement to the opposite, it is not possible in most cases to change the meaning of a sentence with other operations.

In the book of Pelevin's protagonist, the new intellectual Tatar Kiki Nafikov, clearly traumatized by French philosophy, postmodernism is used to explain the realities of Russian life in the 1990s.

The postmodernist discourse in this context is perceived as incongruous and subject to ironic overcoding. The result of his thought is that Russian bandits and French philosophers are recognized as natural postmodernists. Postmodernist theory is recoded with the help of the signs of the criminal subculture. The compulsory reading of postmodernist writings turns into a torture so sophisticated that its victims are sympathetic to the hard-hearted fraternity.

== Opinions and reviews ==
Dmitry Bykov:

- I do not really like the French philosophers of the second half of the XX century (and indeed the XX century as a whole, I would venture to say) – for reasons that are so comprehensively outlined in Pelevin's "Macedonian criticism of French thought." Of all these people, perhaps, I'd select only Foucault (and that's just partially), and Baudrillard and Derrida all arouse nothing but dull irritation.
- Pelevin is a consummate researcher of emptiness. It would be a gross mistake to say that he sees it everywhere. But wherever it is, he exposes it instantly. Whatever a clay machine-gun from Chapaev and Void is headed upon – after a brief flash before us an absolute nothingness emerges, and Pelevin masterfully made this operation with all the post-Soviet ideologemes sewn on a live thread. The idea of career and personal prosperity has been metaphorically exposed in his Prince of Central Planning, the philosophy of the post-industrial society - in Generation P and Macedonian Criticism of French thought ...

== Facts ==
- In an interview, answering to the question, "Why was it so interesting for you to write, for example, about Baudrillard and Derrida?" Pelevin said: "I was wondering if I could put these intellectuals in an emphatically anti-intellectual surrounding. It's just like making Schwarzenegger a governor, but the opposite. "
- In 2007, the publishing house of "Eksmo" released a self-titled book, which includes, in addition to the story itself, 12 other works by the author. Afterwards, the book has been republished several times.
