= Mardongi =

1991 short story by Victor Pelevin

- Author: Victor Pelevin
- Language: Russian
- Genre: Short story
- Publication date: 1991
- Publication place: Russia
- Media type: Print (Paperback)
- ISBN: 5-85950-013-0

Mardongi (Russian: «Мардонги») is a short story by Victor Pelevin, published in 1991.

== Plot ==
The story is a philosophical-satirical pseudo-review by Victor Pelevin. It is a parody of religious studies, a satire on religious-philosophical movements and sects, a "canonization" of "ideologies, works, and great men.

According to the author's thought, the word "mardong" is Tibetan and denotes a whole set of concepts. Originally, it was the name of a cult object, which was obtained this way: If a person in life was distinguished by holiness, purity or, on the contrary, represented, figuratively speaking, "the flower of evil", then after death, which, incidentally, Tibetans always considered one of the stages of personal development, the body of such a person was not buried in the ground, but made of it "mardong" – a place of power and religious worship. A sect is forming around the so-called "mardongs" in Russia in the early 1990s.

The essence of the story is a pure reflection of the sect's views, its theoretical works and its main figure – Antonov, after whom it was named, the attributes of the members of this movement, etc.

A peculiar cult of death is created in the sect; all life, called in the sect "primordial mortality," is seen as preparation for death . Spiritual practices are developed in the sect, in particular the chanting of the mantra "Pushkin is great". The image of the poet plays a major role in the sect of the Antonovs. Another practice is the study of ancient Russian culture. Thus, matryoshka becomes supposedly a system of embedded dead people.

After Antonov's "self-realization" (in ordinary parlance, death), his "mardong," that is, a specially treated corpse turned into a statue, becomes a place of pilgrimage for the sectarians.

In the story, through the theory of a certain philosopher Antonov about the lifetime nurturing of the inner dead by each of the living people continues to embody and realize Pelevin's idea of eternity and the single essence of the human spirit and flesh, the living and the dead in the universe. According to Pelevin's Antonov, from the moment of birth every living person begins to nurture death, a corpse, because continuation of life leads to inevitable approach to death.

Life and death in Pelevin's philosophy turn out to be communicating vessels, those two entities that are inseparable from each other. According to Pelevin (or according to the conviction of his hero), the entire spiritual life [of man] must be oriented toward his "mardong," the dead man that we carry within us, for he becomes the transitional state of man from one being to another.

For all the ironic stance of the author, the underlying meaning of Pelevin's story turns out to be far from humorous. The popular phrase about the duality of light and darkness, right and left, life and death finds its philosophical realization in the author's text, which makes us think about the justice of his character's dialectical judgment.

And in this sense, Pelevin's creation of the word-neologism "mardongi" is almost on a par with the notion of Buddhist nirvana. It is as if the writer creates his own version of "Russian Buddhism", trying oriental truths on to the national mentality. That is, time, space, memory, sleep, life, death become in Pelevin the categories of one series, one philosophical system.
