= Zombification (essay) =

1990 essay by Victor Pelevin

- Author: Victor Pelevin
- Language: Russian
- Genre: Essay
- Publication date: 1990
- Publication place: Russia
- Media type: Print (Paperback)
- ISBN: 978-5-699-12257-8

Zombification (Russian: «Зомбификация») is an essay by Victor Pelevin, published in 1990. The essay was first published in 1990 in the New Journal under the title "The Zombification of the Soviet Man".

== Plot ==
The essay is subtitled "Experiences of Comparative Anthropology," setting the reader up for a scientific narrative. The protagonist of the first chapter is James Bond. He studies Patrick Lay Fermor's "The Traveller's Tree", a book about the Haitian voodoo religion and the transformation of humans into zombies. It turns out that James Bond will have to fight a Haitian Negro zombie who worked for SMERSH.

The author goes on to explain the reason why Jan Flemming associates the Haitian cult with the Stalinist counterintelligence. Natural science writings on zombification, works of fiction, and religious and philosophical treatises are mentioned in this connection. The "scientific" context of the narrative is underscored by the use of many special terms, as well as verbiage typical of scientific literature: "note the connection," "researchers have long speculated," "samples were submitted for analysis," "attempt to give a more or less complete description," "engaged in the study of this problem," and so on.

The essay details the ritual of turning a man into a zombie in Haiti. Adherents of the voodoo cult believe that a person is "several bodies superimposed on each other": a physical body, a "spirit of flesh" (an energetic duplicate of the physical body), and a soul. The soul, in turn, is subdivided into a "big good angel" and a "little good angel." The "big good angel" is the energetic essence that nourishes all living things, while the "little good angel" is the individualized part of the soul. It is the "good little angel" that the magical rituals of the voodoo zombifiers are aimed at.

The chapters "Poisons and Procedures" and "Fugu" describe the physical aspect of Haitian zombification. A person is given "zombie powder," containing a poison secreted from the fugu fish, after which the person is put into a deathlike state and the part of the brain responsible for speech and willpower is destroyed. The zombified person is buried, but after a while he is dug up and given a substance which causes disorientation and amnesia.

The author stresses that the psychological aspect of zombification is more important than the physical one. As an example, the so-called "death command" of the Australian Aborigines is cited. When a shaman pronounces it and points a magic rod at a tribesman, the latter realizes that he has been cursed, falls ill, and dies in a few days. However, such a command will not work on a European: "he will see a short naked man waving an animal bone and muttering some words. That is, psychological mechanisms are shaped by culture, which can be used as a tool of manipulation. Likewise, an Australian Aboriginal person who had gone to an Anatoly Kashpirovsky séance "would have seen a short, well-dressed man mumbling some words and staring intently into the hall.

In the second part of the essay, beginning with the chapter "homo sovetskii", the author shows how the phenomenon of zombification spreads to the inhabitants of the USSR. Many parallels are drawn between archaic rites and Soviet reality. It turns out that magic played an even greater role in the USSR than in Haiti.

Magic begins in childhood: the first initiation is the reception to the Little Octobrists, and the second is the reception to the Pioneers, where the rudiments of magical rituals (salute, tie and "honest pioneering") are already evident. The author uses the turn "magic haunts", the word "educator" is taken in quotes, "administrative and pedagogical staff" is used instead of the word "teacher". In this way, Pelevin emphasizes that the goal of the described procedures is not to raise a harmoniously developed person, but to create a flawed creature with a suppressed will. The third stage of initiation is called admission to the Komsomol, when a person already participates in "numerous and little-noticed magical procedures. An important feature of this stage is the transition of rituals to the subconscious level and their becoming a part of behavior. The fourth stage of initiation is joining a party.

Drawing a parallel with the Haitian concept of the structure of the soul, Pelevin writes that a resident of the USSR "in addition to the physical, has several subtle bodies, as if superimposed on each other: the domestic, industrial, party, military, international and deputy bodies.

When ideology moves to the subconscious level, a person forms an "inner party committee" that dictates his behavior. And if the Haitian sorcerer steals his "good little angel" to subdue the zombified person to his will, in the USSR such an "angel" is replaced by a "party" controlled by the state. Thus, a person acquires a communist "loyalty," which he is afraid to lose.

Another important factor in the zombification of the Soviet man is service in the army, which the author calls "zombification". By this term is meant a change in a person's consciousness and his enslavement.
