= P5: Farewell songs of the political pygmies of Pindostan =

Collection of short stories by Viktor Pelevin

- Author: Victor Pelevin
- Language: Russian
- Genre: Short stories
- Publication date: 2008
- Publication place: Russia
- Media type: Print (Paperback)
- Pages: 288 pp
- ISBN: 978-5-699-30532-2

P5: Farewell songs of the political pygmies of Pindostan (Russian: «П5: прощальные песни политических пигмеев пиндостана») is a short story collection by Victor Pelevin, published in 2008 in Russia. The work consists of five unrelated stories: The Hall of the Singing Caryatids, Feeding the crocodile Khufu, The Necroment, Friedman Space and Assassin.

== Plot ==
=== The Hall of the Singing Caryatids ===
The main character, Lena, gets a job in a secret brothel for oligarchs, where she and the other girls must portray caryatids sculptures in the absence of customers.

The girls work in shifts, three days at a time. In addition to standing still, they also have to sing. It's hard, but they get paid well. In order to remain motionless for a long time, they use a secret drug, which they are injected before work. After the injection, one can easily stand for several days and not get tired or bored, time flies by unnoticed. The drug is developed on the basis of an extract from the insect mantis. The praying mantis is known to be able to completely freeze, scooping up its prey. Everything would be fine, but the drug had an unexpected effect: the girls began to imagine themselves as mantises, to see the otherworld of mantises and to communicate with the spirit of the mantis.

=== Feeding the crocodile Khufu ===
Three young people find themselves at the performance of a certain magician. They are dissatisfied with his performance, but an audio recording on the magician's cassette, which the characters listened to, turned out to be quite interesting and told them about the history of the trick called "Feeding the crocodile Khufu". It turned out to be as mysterious as the trick itself. Of all the magicians of ancient Egypt, none was so revered as the great Jedi, who lived under Pharaoh Khufu.

He raised the dead, changed the direction of rivers, caused eclipses, and created bizarre animals - lions with eagle's wings and horses with spider legs. He showed Pharaoh pictures of other worlds that were stunning in their majesty and beauty. It was said that he could connect the present with the past and the future, changing the natural course of things. An account of his miracles was written on three obelisks - no one had ever been so honored before. Pharaoh brought him close to him and pampered him, then suddenly ordered his execution.

=== The Necroment ===
The story of a traffic police general who, for occult purposes, killed his subordinates (employees of the Ministry of Internal Affairs), cremated the corpses and hid the ashes, adding them as "ecological additives" to the "sleeping policeman" material.

History draws a parallel between the fate of the Moscow general and Gilles de Re burned at the stake in 1440, the French marshal, who confessed to relations with the devil and ritual alchemical murders, may well be called a spiritual twin of the former deputy chief of Moscow traffic police.

=== Friedman Space ===
The story combines a parodic popular science narrative ostensibly from the cutting edge of science with a denunciation of the oligarchs and the FSB.

It turns out that similar to the cosmological effects of gravity discovered by A.A. Friedman, Stephen Hawking and others, there are also the effects of the attraction of money to money. This is allegedly established experimentally in dangerous experiments on people. Moreover, if the amount of money is very large, as in the FSB experiments on this subject, something like a black hole is formed, where the "doughnut" (money carrier) gets, descending beyond the Schwarzmann horizon, apparently analogous to the Schwarzschild sphere in cosmology.

The only visual data from under the Schwarzmann horizon is an image of an unremarkable corridor.

=== Assassin ===
The story of the boy Ali, caught in his early childhood in a high mountain castle, where he is made an assassin, but gradually he realizes the artificiality of the heavenly gifts he receives for committing murders and eventually escapes from the castle.

The story is accompanied by several "commentaries": a Sufi, a historian, a cultural historian, a lawyer and a drug addict. As if to enumerate all those levels of influence on the unformed brain of the assassin.
