= Pineapple Water for the Fair Lady =

2010 short story collection by Victor Pelevin

- Author: Victor Pelevin
- Language: Russian
- Genre: Short stories
- Publication date: 2010
- Publication place: Russia
- Media type: Print (Paperback)
- Pages: 352 pp
- ISBN: 978-5-699-46291-9

Pineapple Water for the Fair Lady (Russian: «Ананасная вода для прекрасной дамы») is a short story collection by Victor Pelevin, published in 2010 in Russia. The work is composed of two unequal parts: Gods and Mechanisms is the larger part, while Mechanisms and Gods shorter. The first part consists of two stories: Operation "Burning Bush" and The Anti-Aircraft Codes of Al Efesbi. The second part includes three stories: The Shadow Contemplator, Thuggee and Hotel of good incarnations.

== Plot ==
=== Operation "Burning Bush" ===
The protagonist of the novel, Semion Levitan, likes to imitate the voice of the famous World War II era radio host Yuri Levitan in Russia. He became an English teacher in Moscow during the period following perestroika. These two occurrences lead him to be involved in a secret operation of the security forces. He had to reproduce the voice of God from a distance in the brain of President George W. Bush, who was considered very religious. To this end, Semion takes an accelerated theological training course in a secret base, using texts with religious content and using narcotics to experience mystical experiences. In addition, he is implanted with a tooth equipped with the appropriate technology.

During the secret operation it appears that the Americans are conducting similar operations with the leaders of the USSR and then Russia, with the difference that the broadcasts reproduce the voice of the devil in the brains of the Russian leaders and not that of God. But with the same goal of influencing their geopolitical decisions.

The story is interspersed with Pelevine's sarcastic humour. It is written in the first person, that of the hero Semion. Unlike his previous stories, the mystical experiences take place in a Western monotheistic setting rather than an Eastern one. The idea of the novel is based on the religious beliefs of George W. Bush, who put forward expressions such as: "God speaks through me" (in 2004) and again: "God told me to attack Al Qaeda and I did it. With the help of God who is on our side we will be victorious".

=== The Anti-Aircraft Codes of Al Efesbi ===
The story consists of two parts: "Freedom liberator" and "Soviet requiem. The first part is a third-person, probably bespoke, biography of Savely Skotenkov. The second part is narrated in the first person.

Born in the Oryol oblast shortly before the collapse of the USSR, Savely Skotenkov moves to Moscow. There he worked in the media industry, changing several professions: "he wrote lyric poems and critical articles, was engaged in art criticism, political consulting, revolutionary work and marketing". His political views oscillated all the time between pro-state and opposition. At the Diplomatic Academy, he taught a course on "the basics of cryptodiscourse," according to which behind the outward political correctness of any utterance is a true essence that can be learned to grasp.

Having decided to earn on currency market trading Savely Skotenkov loses almost all his money, having believed the prognosticators of the leading English-language mass media.He begins to blame the Americans for his troubles, and soon he is recruited by the FSB.

Then the action is transferred to Afghanistan where there is a war at that time. The Americans there are actively using combat drones (drones, UAVs). But often recordings of conversations and actions of drone operators during the decision to strike surfaced on the site of WikiLeaks. This causes public outrage over inhumane methods of warfare. Drone operators develop "Wikileaks syndrome" (the fear of publishing their records on WikiLeaks), resulting in slower decision-making. In addition, there are cases of enemy interception of drone control.

To solve both problems, the Americans are implementing autonomous artificial intelligence in their drones. The machines make their own decisions about strikes, and as a result, their effectiveness increases many times over and the number of accidental casualties is reduced. In order to finally reassure the public, an auxiliary module responsible for PR is embedded in the neural network of each drone. Thanks to it, the decision-making process for a strike is simulated in a talk-show format, for which the archive of American television is used.

Then Savely Skotenkov appears in Afghanistan, nicknamed Al-Efesbi (allegedly "from Efes", variant: from the FSB). He develops an extraordinary defense against drones: he writes slogans on the ground (the so-called "anti-aircraft codes") capable of "causing the average viewer to be indignant, disgusted and angered by the desire to give a decent rebuke. When the "anti-aircraft codes" come into the drone's field of view, the PR module starts searching the archive for appropriate responses, and if that fails, the search is repeated again with slightly different criteria. The load on the system seriously increases, which leads to loss of control and drone crash.

The Americans explain Skotenkov's actions by his unhealthy mental state and his feelings about the collapse of the USSR: "Apparently ... the collapse of the Evil Empire coincided for him with his expulsion from the magic garden of his childhood, and he tends to blame everything on America - especially its special services. In addition, America has become for him a symbolic culprit for the hardships and sorrows of adult life with its inevitable finale - death. The U.S. military is trying to influence Skotenkov psychologically by scattering leaflets over the desert, reminding him of the collapse of the USSR and the hated realities of modern Russia.

These leaflets soon appear in Russia in the form of heroin packages, because the leaflets are picked up in the desert by Afghan producers of the drug. Russian authorities decide that the Americans want to make a color revolution at the hands of drug addicts. In exchange for stopping the leaflets, the FSB recalls Skotenkov from Afghanistan, and he returns to his native village. There he decides to write his memoirs, but is kidnapped by the CIA.

The second part of the story, "Soviet Requiem" (an allusion to Borges' famous short story "German Requiem"), consists of a possibly unreal monologue by Skotenkov in a CIA prison. There he is subjected to torture and medical manipulation in order to destroy dissent: "The interrogator said that my identity would remain the same, but my ability to think logically would be 'modified.' In addition, my, as he put it, "mistrust of my neighbors" would disappear. Moreover, it will disappear to such an extent that I will be forever unshackled. At the end, Skotenkov is turned into a chronic currency player, suffering at any change in the euro/dollar exchange rate.

The story "Al-Efesbi's flaky codes" can be categorized as a dystopia. There are parallels with such classic dystopian works as Yevgeny Zamyatin's "We", Vladimir Nabokov's "Invitation to a Beheading", and George Orwell's "1984". As in these works, the physical destruction of the rebel is not the primary goal of the totalitarian state. The main thing for his enemies is to make him like himself, to subjugate his will. There are also references to the story "The Bird of Steel" by Vasily Aksenov. The surname of Popenkov, the protagonist of Steel Bird, is consonant with Skotenkov, and the American planes shot down by Skotenkov are called "steel birds".

The story contains philosophical arguments about the possibility of artificial intelligence and the existence of the soul with allusions to the theories of Alan Turing and Roger Penrose. Questions are raised: "can a machine suffer and feel?", "is it possible to 'spiritualize' a machine?"

In his work, Pelevin literalizes the concept of "information warfare." U.S. drones serve both military and media functions. Skotenkov's actions also fall within the definition of information warfare, since his weapon of choice is text.

=== The Shadow Contemplator ===
The story describes the attempt of Oleg, a Russian guide in India, to learn from his own shadow during a long meditation. The hero barely survives, and the story does not answer whether what he saw was an illusion or a real experience. The story is pierced with irony, both in relation to European attempts to penetrate Indian culture and in relation to India itself.

=== Thuggee ===
The story appears to be a short novel, generates a lover of the Illuminati, Freemasons and other secret societies with a lot of secret symbols and signs. Pelevin quite wittily showed the activity of a homegrown "villain" philosopher, who never really thought about what kind of service his favorite goddess needs.

The protagonist Boris continues his search for members of the Thuggee sect, secret worshippers of the Indian goddess Kali, who offer human sacrifices to her. Boris wants to join this sect, but in the end becomes a victim himself.

=== Hotel of good incarnations ===
The soul of the girl-to-be Masha gets a chance to see the moment of her own conception. In an expensive hotel at a fashionable ski resort, an angel and the unborn daughter of a Russian oligarch talk about how the world works, watching oligarchs spend time with their ladies of the heart.

With Masha ahead, she is to be born in Los Angeles to a Russian oligarch's family, in a world where everyone aspired to participate in the mysterious ritual of "sawing off" money. But she cannot influence her choice of who to become, the attractive lady Alexander Blok or one of those to whom Vladimir Mayakovsky agreed to serve pineapple water at the bar.

But she can choose whether to be born now or go into oblivion and meet her strange angel again, but in a different time and with completely different people. After a brief examination of the circumstances and the angel's explanations, she flatly refuses to be incarnated as the daughter of a Russian oligarch.

It is in this story that the jar of pineapple water, which gave its name to the collection and is a quotation from Vladimir Mayakovsky, occurs.
