= The Water Tower (short story) =

1990 short story by Victor Pelevin

- Short story by Victor Pelevin
- Country: Russia
- Language: Russian

Publication
- Media type: Print (Paperback)
- Publication date: 1990

The Water Tower (Russian: «Водонапорная башня») is a short story by Victor Pelevin, published in 1990.

== Plot ==
The story is written in the form of one complex sentence, stretching over 13 pages containing almost 2,800 words. The author uses this technique to illustrate the journey of life. Life seems endless, but its end is a point.

The main role in the story is played by images, physical space is absent in it. One might assume that the story describes the vivid experiences of Pelevin himself, but its time frame is shifted backward: the hero's childhood memory is of the builders laying out the year "1928" on the water tower.

Of the images presented in the story: first impressions of childhood, adult memories of the Civil War, school, geography teacher, pioneer camp, fashion for aviation and pilots, repressions of the 30s, songs by Utesov, the Great Patriotic War, children, Stalin's death, work, cosmonauts, Soviet "Victory" cars, the death of his wife, jogging in the park, the impression of old age and the near-death pain in the heart.

The water tower, which is visible to the narrator, serves as a point of departure for the narrator's reasoning, which forms the plot of the story, in which Pelevin's familiar ideas and images are revealed with the utmost clarity. The water tower becomes a point of account for the narrator's multiple observations and reflections, opens up his life and description, and then closes, creating a circular composition. Each new thought or judgement by the narrator seems to build this tower, creating another ring that takes the tower all the way to the heavens.

The narrative of the story is organized with the knowledge of the protagonist, who is notoriously difficult. Literary studies to be the author's alter ego. It seems as if the author's character is watching from his room at night, observing the construction of a water tower.

However, the date that the soldiers-constructors put at the top of the tower under construction goes far beyond the author's age and does not correspond to the chronological timeline of Pelevin's timeline. The author seems to shift the vertical of time, taking 1928 as a preconditioned reference point (perhaps a random date seen on this tower).

This shift in the timeline means that the "author's" character, modeling his life (built, like the tower) in a postmodernist way, breaks down the timeline, turns out to be more realistic and realistic than what the author might have appeared to be in – not in contemporary Plevin's Moscow, not in the revolutionary capital, but (relatively) in Moscow of the 1950s or 1960s. The iconic features of the depicted time are the hero's childhood fascination with model planes.

The image of the tower, which could have been built in the sky, gives rise in the text to an allusion to the image of the Biblical Tower of Babel. This is alluded to by a small piece of text borrowed from the Bible in the story.
