= Love for three Zuckerbrins =

2014 novel by Victor Pelevin

- First edition
- Author: Victor Pelevin
- Language: Russian
- Genre: Novel
- Publisher: Эксмо
- Publication date: 2014
- Publication place: Russia
- Media type: Print (Paperback)
- Pages: 448 pp
- ISBN: 978-5-699-85276-5

Love for three Zuckerbrins (Russian: «Любовь к трём цукербринам») is a novel by Victor Pelevin first published in 2014.

In the title of the novel there is an obvious allusion to the fiaba "The Love for Three Oranges" a fairy-tale play written by Carlo Gozzi in 1760. The term "Zuckerbrin" itself was formed as a synthesis of the names of two giants of the modern web industry, Sergey Brin and Mark Zuckerberg.

== Plot ==
The novel mentions such trends as Google, Facebook, the cult of consumption, tolerance, Internet addiction, terrorism, information slavery. Heroes live, reflect, philosophize. And all this happens against the background of the well-known game Angry Birds.

The protagonist of the novel Kesha, lives in two dimensions, in the present and in a possible alternative future. In the present, Kesha works for an online news agency called Contra.ru. There are many interpretations of this name alone: kontora in the sense that it was before the offices, and office in the sense of something to do with the special services, and contra in the sense of opposition and similar to the name of several well-known Internet projects. And so Pelevin does with many names and titles.

Kesha's day off is described. All day he sits at his computer: trolling in various posts, playing computer games, watching a movie, masturbating on a porn site to a Japanese animation. By the end of the day he thinks he should get some air: he opens the window, sighs, and closes it.

Kesha had a real girlfriend, but he rarely went out with her. He didn't like that she was overweight. When he did have sex with her, he imagined she was a Japanese girl.

One time the plastid-wrapped terrorist Batu Karayev came there and blew up Contra, along with Kesha and the other employees.

In another dimension, in the future, Kesha lives in orbit around the Earth in a capsule that makes up a whole anthill with other such capsules.

The man floats in zero gravity all wrapped in wires. He is fed through a tube into which proteins, fats, and carbohydrates are pumped, but he perceives it as a variety of food. The food has to be paid for, as does all the virtual reality he is surrounded by. At the same time the person knows that he is dangling in weightlessness and is in something like a tin can, but he does not care.

If he wants to, he can go to this basic level, but he's not interested there. Everything interesting is in his head. That's how the last Russian crackpots lived - there was no room for them on the land. Land was too much of a luxury for them. The people in the pods slept all the time, but their dreams were divided into different phases.

There was a phase of public sleep, where they met, there was a phase of random sleep, where one saw what one wanted, and there was a phase of individual sleep, but there they were shown the right movies and other useful programs.

Kesha made his money by running around the virtual stadium until he was exhausted. He would fall and hurt his feet on the glass. The goal of the job was for the man to endure as much pain as possible. With the money he received, Kesha paid for virtual food and other things.

The main ones in this world were the three Zuckerbrins. It is difficult to say what they were, but they were perceived as light and as joy. And at the same time there were three tsukherbrins for each person. Sometimes a person could see them. And then he would go into ecstasy.

The word itself was derived from the names of giants of the past, Zuckerberg and Brin. And why were there three Zuckerbrins. Most likely because it was a Trinity.

Every inhabitant of this world had a social partner, and that partner for Kesha was the terrorist Baku Kuraev, who was hiding under the guise of an old nymphomaniac. He died, but he left Kesha a message.

In that message he explained his behavior. Batu had once been a programmer and had a different name. But one day he realized that man is not free in his thoughts. Those thoughts are forced upon him. People from birth think the thoughts imposed upon them.

This all started when semiconductors were invented. They weren't invented - it was the silicon-organic civilization that began to colonize the Earth.

Zuckerbrins are invaders and are like triple viruses. They can only be destroyed along with the host. They feed on human sexual energy; it is not for nothing that already in the early days of the Internet, sex content took up most of the traffic.

Realizing all this, the programmer took the name of an ancient terrorist and began to take revenge. He killed 500 Zuckerbrinses, but then realized that his thoughts were not free, but imposed; the system needed terrorists for even greater control over people. Then, he stopped taking revenge and started hiding.
