= Uhryab =

1991 short story by Victor Pelevin

- Author: Victor Pelevin
- Language: Russian
- Genre: Short story
- Publication date: 1991
- Publication place: Russia
- Media type: Print (Paperback)
- ISBN: 5-85950-013-0

Uhryab (Russian: «Ухряб») is a short story by Victor Pelevin, published in 1991.

== Plot ==
The events of Pelevin's early period story take place in Soviet times (judging by the line "we've had so much incomprehensible stuff these seventy years" – in the second half of the 1980s).

The hero of the story, a retired humanitarian named Maralov, who in order not to feel permanently retired, responds to readers' letters to journals, for example, to a schoolboy's question, "Why do I live?" The rest of the time he chats with a single student on general philosophical topics. And so, during another drunken conversation, he expresses the unexpected idea that God is the personified generalization of everything incomprehensible in an individual country. He exists objectively, and a certain religious mysticism corresponds to him.

The morning after the hangover it turns out that the idea is rooted in the soul of its inventor in the form of a strange word "uhryab", Russian for "ухряб". Uhryab is just a set of letters or sounds that accompany the hero.

The hero begins to see the ubiquitous "uhryab" everywhere: in the sounds of chopping meat, in a hidden form in works of classical literature, as an acrostic in slogans («Успеха участникам XI международного фестиваля за разоружение и ядерную безопасность!», "Success to participants of the XI International Festival for Disarmament and Nuclear Safety!"), in the sequence of pictures on the wall.

Gradually the new local deity becomes the manic passion of the hero, he sees himself sandwiched between two "uhryab" as in the press, and he does not yet agree to recognize himself as one, although this is not fair, since the "uhryab" and inside. The mania leads to the hero's voluntary death – outside the city in a snow-covered pit, which appears to him to be "an uhryab in its original form," which is the natural end of the story, the last, ninth chapter of which consists of one sentence: "They found him two days later – skiers, by a red sock sticking out of the snow."

In the story, the main character at a certain point realizes the meaninglessness and emptiness of the world around him. And he must come to terms with it. But to come to terms not because he is a victim of the Soviet system, but because for Pelevin and his hero, who accepts the world in all its manifestations, there is no other way out. There is no way out in the usual sense, because in any case Pelevin's hero will only find himself in a different name of the huge world, the essence of it will not change.

Uhryab is a mind-blowing Deity (or its symbol), the personification of everything incomprehensible. Uhryab in its pure form is "a long snowy hole with two rather tall, half the height of a red deer, icy ridges on the edges. Such an uhryab resembles both a grave and a woman's womb, which makes death a return to the earthly womb. The neologism "uhryab" represents Verdichtung, 'condensation,' in the Freudian sense, i.e., the combination of different images, concepts, words or syllables into one whole.

In the story, Pelevin uses the technique of wordplay: combining parts of adjacent words to form a new meaning. This is how the "uhryab" appears.

Some literary critics find in the story a reference to the work of Nabokov.
