= Blue Lantern (short story) =

1991 short story by Victor Pelevin

- Cover of The Blue Lantern and Other Stories
- Author: Victor Pelevin
- Language: Russian
- Genre: Short story
- Publication date: 1991
- Publication place: Russia
- Media type: Print (Paperback)
- ISBN: 5-85950-013-0

Blue Lantern (Russian: «Синий фонарь») is a short story by Victor Pelevin, published in 1991.

== Plot ==
The plot of the story is simple enough, the boys on vacation in a pioneer camp tell terrible stories to each other. During the discussion, the teenagers ask questions about the meaning of existence, life and death, but the answers to the questions raised are ambiguous. Confronted with "philosophical and mystical questions," the young narrator prepares for a literary encounter: he either recalls the encounter or contemplates the end of his "horror story".

Not named by name, the boy is noticeably different from the others: he participates in the entertainment against his will to dispel the oppressive atmosphere.

The synthesis of the light coming from the electric light-the "blue lantern" - and from the moonlight brings to the story an element of mystery characteristic of postmodernism. The blue color is identified in the narrative with something scary and frightening.

After one of the stories, the youngest in the group, Kolya, confusing play with reality, runs to the teacher in terror.

The last story finally connects fiction with reality - the children in the ward finally fall asleep, just like the pioneers discussed in the sixth "story. Reality triumphs over the mystical, but the "eternal questions" (who we are, where we come from... where is the difference between life and death, who has the right to consider himself truly alive) remain unanswered (in the tradition of Russian classical literature)".

The image-symbol of the "blue lantern" loops the story, "testifying to the immutability, truth, absoluteness of its impact on the fates of the characters in the story. All the stories listed in the story are nothing more than a child's tales in a pioneer camp at night. Pioneer horror stories with Soviet roots conveying the spirit of late Soviet times, with little refinements and nuances that could only be in the USSR. But the blue lantern that shines outside the window shines with a kind of metaphysical light. And the pounding of the train outside the window is a mysterious, metaphysical pounding. And in these tales of the Soviet book-reading child there is some whiff, some whiff of the unprecedented.

Particularly noteworthy is the "two-worldness" of the artistic picture of the world. The writer does not simply work with "ordinary" postmodern simulacra. Next to the "real" worlds he creates there are "virtual" worlds, so that they interpenetrate into each other, one is replaced by the other, and as a result it becomes unclear which world is "real" and which is "virtual. It is as if Pelevin is playing with the reader in Postmodernist games, riddles, creating additional difficulties for the perception and interpretation of the test.

This story can be attributed to the so-called mystery stories, in which initially it is impossible to determine the essence of what is happening, to identify the characters and unambiguously read the plot episode. Only as the reader perceives, at one point or another, will the reader receive directions and details that allow him to adequately understand what is being portrayed and finally understand the main idea that the author has laid down.
