= Numbers (novel) =

Novel by Victor Pelevin

- Author: Victor Pelevin
- Language: Russian
- Genre: Novel
- Publication date: 2003
- Publication place: Russia
- Media type: Print (Paperback)
- Pages: 288 pp
- ISBN: 5-699-03491-9

Numbers (Russian: «Числа») is a novel by Victor Pelevin first published in 2003 in a collection of stories «The Dialectics of the Transition Period (from Nowhere to No Place)».

== Plot ==
The novel is about the life of a Soviet boy named Styopa, who resorts to the magic of numbers. At first he chose the number seven as his patron number, but then he changed his choice in favor of the number 34. First, seven was "worshipped" by many famous people, and Styopa estimated his chances of "being heard" by the number 7 as minimal. Secondly, the sum of 3 and 4 gave the same seven. Subsequently, always guided by his number and its peculiarities, Styopa became a businessman, and in the post-Soviet period he became a very successful banker.

But one day fate brings him also to the manifestations of the enemy number 43, which is the antipode of the number 34. To make matters worse, Styopa discovered that another Russian banker, in the same weight class and rotating in similar circles, had chosen the number 43 as his personal patron. The meeting with this man had been foretold to him long before that by a clairvoyant. When Styopa turns 43, this circumstance brings him a lot of trouble, puts him in extremely uncomfortable situations, and undermines the balance of his inner world.

The work, like many of Pelevin's novels, is replete with parallels to the phenomena of contemporary culture. For example, Mus Julianovna (Styopa's woman) identifies herself and him with Pokémon, and the FSB officer identifies himself as a Jedi.

This novel is about the way: the way of the banker, the way of the samurai (hagakure), the way of the consumer to his dreams, the route of oil; finally, the Way of Tao.

The narrative is complete with ringed, bold metaphors-they alone can feed the reader's imagination for quite a long time. "Stepa has respected Pasternak since high school, knowing how difficult it is to find among the domestic hostages of eternity to time in captivity those who do not suffer from Stockholm syndrome in an acute festering form."

The novel makes connections to dozens of classic works of Russian literature, which include: Dostoevsky's «Crime and Punishment», «The Brothers Karamazov», Sologub's «The Petty Devil», Kaverin's «The Two Captains», Solzhenitsyn's «The Gulag Archipelago», and numerous references to the works of Leo Tolstoy, Alexander Pushkin («Eugene Onegin», in particular) and Vladimir Mayakovsky. There is also a dialogue with European and American literature: references to Shakespeare («Hamlet», «Romeo and Juliet»), Stendhal («The Red and the Black»). The strongest connection both in the subject matter and in the creative method of the novel can be traced to Russian avant-gardists, in particular, to the poets of OBERIU: A. Vvedensky, D. Kharms, and N. Zabolotsky.
