= IPhuck 10 =

2017 novel by Victor Pelevin

iPhuck 10
- First edition
- Author: Victor Pelevin
- Language: Russian
- Genre: Novel
- Publisher: Эксмо
- Publication date: 2017
- Publication place: Russia
- Media type: Print (Paperback)
- Pages: 480 pp
- ISBN: 978-5-04-093653-3

iPhuck 10 is a novel by Victor Pelevin first published in 2017.

Porfiry Petrovich is a literary-police algorithm. He investigates crimes and simultaneously writes detective novels about them, earning money for the Police Department.

Maruha Cho is an art historian with a lot of money and a woman with balls according to her official gender. Her specialty is the so-called "cast," the art of the first quarter of the twenty-first century. She needs an assistant to analyze the market. A rented Porfiry becomes that person.

"iPhuck 10" is described as the most expensive love gadget on the market and the most famous of Porfiry's 244 detectives. It has been called a "masterpiece of algorithmic police prose at the end of the century, an encyclopedic novel about the future of love, art, and everything else."

== Plot ==
A literary-police algorithm named Porfiry Petrovich (the essence of his job is to investigate crimes and, in parallel, to write detective novels about them-the proceeds of which fill the coffers of the Police Department) hopes to obtain a murder case that might launch his literary career, but instead finds himself rented out to a private client. The hero narrator is a writing mind devoid of bodily embodiment. He says of himself that he is "a typical Russian artificial intelligence of the second half of the 21st century," a "police-literary robot ZA-3478/PH0 bilt 9.3" with the Dostoevsky name Porfiry Petrovich. He lives only in the network space, and his character, according to his own apt definition, "is painted in the contrasting tones of our historical and cultural memory" and combines both "Radishchev and Pasternak and as if an interrogator in their joint case".

His temporary landlady, an art historian and curator known by the pseudonym Maruha Cho (real name Mara Gnedikh), uses Porfiry to scout the contemporary art market. The police algorithm must help her find out everything possible about the transactions associated with the so-called "Age of Plaster" - the most important (and most expensive) period in modern art history, which occurs around our time, which is the beginning of the twenty-first century, and which is eighty years removed from the events described in the novel.

Porfiry takes up the work, deftly packing all the materials of the case into the format of the next novel, but soon enough he realizes that Mara is not quite honest with him, and the true role of his much more complex and ambivalent than it first seems... Porfiry tries to outplay Mara, but the man is still smarter than the machine, and soon Porfiry finds himself confined in the space of half an X-exabyte.

Russia's politics in this novel have changed significantly: the Russian Federation is now called the Russian Empire, it is a monarchy (restored in the late 2030s), and it is ruled by a cloned sovereign (38 percent of biological material was taken from Nikita Mikhalkov's left mustache and dosed with genomes from European, Chinese and Abyssinian dynasties). If something bad happens to the Sovereign, then Arkady the First is replaced by Arkady the Second, the Third, and so on down the list. The events described in the novel unfold under Arkady the Sixth.

Pelevin's strongest concern is the question of artificial intelligence and its relationship with the intelligence of nature.

The second issue raised in the novel is gender and sexuality; in the world created by Pelevin, the trends, barely outlined today, are brought to their apogee: the category of gender has completely split, and along with the concept of gender the traditional understanding of sexuality has disintegrated. In the world described in the novel, sex does not exist. That is, it is no longer engaged bodily. Or rather, it no longer requires two biological individuals, but one. Sexual contact between a man and a woman, a man and a man, a woman and a woman, and in general any kind of sex where the presence of more than one biological body is required, is marginalized and even criminalized due to the spread of viruses which are not dangerous for the carriers but disastrous for the offspring.

The next subject is contemporary art, its structure and methods of legitimization.
