= T (novel) =

2009 novel by Victor Pelevin

t
- Author: Victor Pelevin
- Language: Russian
- Genre: Novel
- Publication date: 2009
- Publication place: Russia
- Media type: Print (Paperback)
- Pages: 384 pp
- ISBN: 978-5-699-37515-8

t is a novel by Victor Pelevin first published in 2009.

The novel recounts the journey of the martial arts master Count T. (a reference to Leo Tolstoy), who escapes from his home persecuted by the tsarist police and makes his way to the Optina Monastery, which in the context of this novel takes on the features not of the famous monastery of Orthodoxy, but of some Shambhala, or some obscure place of spiritual enlightenment that exists in the real world.

The leitmotif of this novel-metaphor is the relationship between author and hero, creator and creature, predestination and free will.

== Plot ==
The main hero of the book, Count T., also known as Iron Beard, is a menace of villains and a favorite of the capital's "yellow" press, an adventurer and bon vivant, an expert in cross-dressing, a master of martial arts "naznas" (or "non-resistance to evil by violence"), a good shooter an excellent thrower of knives and other sharpened objects.

The action of the novel begins in the early 20th century, on the train. In the compartment traveling gentleman in a checkered jacket and a priest, they are talking about Count Tolstoy. Then all of a sudden they pull out their pistols. It turns out that one is a disguised Count T., and the other is a detective who is after him. The Count leaps from the window of the train, and the gendarmes knock on the compartment door.

The prototype of this grotesque character was, of course, the great Russian classic Leo Tolstoy, who turned into a superhero, a "Russian Zorro" with the battle cry "Beware!

As is the custom with superheroes, Count T. makes a quest – to spite his enemies seeks the Optina Monastery, of which, due to a slight concussion, he remembers nothing but the name.

On his way he sweeps away hordes of foes and has enlightened conversations with his compartment mate, the provincial landlady and the gypsy baron...

Pretty soon Count T. learns that he is only a character in a book that is composed not even by one author, and the whole brigade of literary slaves, working at the request of a publishing house, expecting to earn money on the novel.

From this moment begins traditional for Pelevin arguments about what is the author, the world, the reader – and whether there is at all Count T., if all his words, thoughts and actions are no more than letters on the monitor, and his life irreversibly changes depending on whether the team of authors is writing an action movie, a patriotic drama or content for a computer shooter.

Other extraordinary figures also appear on the pages of the book: Fyodor Mikhailovich Dostoyevsky, a champion of axe-fighting and dismemberment of dead souls, Vladimir Sergeevich Solovyov, Vasily Ivanovich Chapayev, and some others.

Like most of Pelevinin's novels, this one, too, is divided into exactly three parts.

- 1. The false facade, the imitation of reality.
- 2. The hero's gradual epiphany and dealing with all sorts of clues that explain to him that everything is not really what it seems.
- 3. Finally, the hero's attempt to become himself, to get out of false fetters.

The difference between this novel and the previous ones is the unexpectedly loud, humanistic ending. The heroes of previous novels, having achieved true knowledge, most often simply left our world, moving into another, either joyfully bright or sadly sad. In this novel, the hero discovers that he does in fact exist, that he is not a fiction, and that those who allegedly manipulate him are in fact only suggesting it. At the end of the novel, Tolstoy is already talking to his horse without fear, for he knows that although demons do exist, they simply cannot be succumbed to. The horse reads his new poems to the Count.
