= The Low Tundra =

1999 short story by Victor Pelevin

- Author: Victor Pelevin
- Language: Russian
- Genre: Short story
- Publication date: 1999
- Publication place: Russia
- Media type: Print (Paperback)
- ISBN: 5-300-00509-6

The Low Tundra (Russian: «Нижняя тундра») is a short story by Victor Pelevin, published in 1999.

== Plot ==
Pelevin's satirical-philosophical psychedelic fantasy story shows the reality of 1990s Russia through the aesthetics of medieval Chinese culture.

The Chinese emperor Yuan Meng travels among the worlds using a magical little cart made from magic Hallucinogenic mushrooms.

Traveling to the lower tundra, the emperor needs it to restore harmony and peace to the underworld, because, the former court magician Songham dared to violate the ancient harmonies bequeathed to people by the "Book of Songs". He has created music of destruction and decay. He plays it on upturned cauldrons for boiling rams, which he calls Singing Bowls. It turns out to be a kind of bronze bells of different sizes. Wherever its sounds are heard, people cease to know which is up and which is down. Horror and longing settle in their hearts. Leaving their homes and gardens, they go out on the road and, bowing their necks, dutifully wait for their fate.

To restore the balance, the Emperor goes to the Spirit of the Polar Star in the lower tundra.

Soon the protagonist finds himself in the plague of an American pilot shot down over Siberia, who lives in the plague and listens to "One of Us" by Joan Osborne. He was shot down in an SR-71 "Blackbird" plane, and has been living in the tundra for 20 years. He describes the U.S.-Russia relationship of the 1990s as follows.

"Our places have long been ruled by the spirit of the Big Bucket, and yours by the spirit of the Bear. And they were at enmity with each other. The spirit of the Big Dipper served many like me. We thought we would fight. But then suddenly it turned out that all your shamans have been secretly worshipping the Big Dipper themselves for a long time. The Cold World came, so it was called because it is very cold in our tundra, as well as in yours. Your shamans submitted to ours, and warriors like me were of no use to anyone."

Soon it turns out that the main character needs to get to the conservatory near the Kursk station in Moscow to resolve the issue. He gets to Moscow in a car with a military man who gets him drunk on vodka and steals his fur coat.

The narration then takes an unexpected turn, in which the author tries to show the human consciousness's ability to cling to the reality in which it believes, even though a large number of facts point to the fallacy of those judgments.

According to the plot, the emperor wakes up in Moscow's Sklifosovsky Emergency Hospital. When asked how he got there, it turns out that he is an ordinary Muscovite who yesterday drank vodka at the restaurant "Northern Lights" and was poisoned with clafelin for the purpose of robbery.

For a long time the patient had been undergoing treatment in the hospital and he continued to consider himself an emperor and hatched a plan to escape. He remembered that a pigeon with a white ribbon tied to its leg would show him the way back to the upper tundra. Having escaped from the hospital the emperor caught the pigeon, smeared one feather from its tail with yellow mud from the roadside, tied it by a long rope to his finger and stopped the cab and told it to go in the direction in which the pigeon would fly. In the woods where the bird led Yuan Meng, in a round clearing with traces of campfires, hung a familiar silk cord leading home, he jumped up and clung to the cord, which immediately began to rise up.

At the end of the story, the reader must decide for himself who the narrator was, the emperor or a clafellin-poisoned and temporarily insane resident of Moscow in the early 1990s.
