= Xmas Cyberpunk, or Christmas Night-117.DIR =

1996 short story by Victor Pelevin

- Author: Victor Pelevin
- Language: Russian
- Genre: Short story
- Publication date: 1996
- Publication place: Russia
- Media type: Print (Paperback)
- ISBN: 5-699-03491-9

Xmas Cyberpunk, or Christmas Night-117.DIR (Russian: «Святочный киберпанк, или Рождественская Ночь-117.DIR») is a short story by Victor Pelevin, published in 1996.

== Plot ==
Cyberpunk literature, which emerged as a branch of science fiction, describes the symbiosis of man and machine, with the machine (and all the elements associated with it: cyberspace, virtual reality, artificial intelligence, cyborgs, biorotobots, etc.) necessarily winning.

To a certain extent, "Xmas Cyberpunk" can be seen as a remake of Turgenev's story "Mumu".

The story simulates a situation in which an entire city is put under the power of a computer for 24 hours. At the beginning of the story, the author refers the reader to computer reality. The Latin characters ".DIR" refer to the video file format Adobe Director Movie (a video that can be opened with the help of the Adobe Director program). In the case of Pelevin's story, the ending ".DIR" in the title serves as an unambiguous allusion to the fact that the text is to be taken as an internal computer file, rather than as a written text.

The story was written in the late 1990s, precisely at a time when the development of computer technology allowed the average user to interact successfully with a computer at a new level. With the advent of the operating system Windows 95, equipped with the now familiar graphical interface, the computer began to play an increasingly important role in the life of the individual and society as a whole.

The central event of the story is that the virus "PH-117.DIR" ("Christmas Night"), having infected the computer of the mayor of the fictional town of Petroplahovsk, for one day "took over" the management of the state and criminal structures of the town.

The computer, infected by the virus, appears as one of the main characters in the story. In this sense, the ending is telling, where the mayor Vanyukov, who considered the computer "a quite animate being," "bursting into his office and snatching a nickel-plated Beretta from his shoulder holster, pushed away the shrieking secretary and with fifteen 9mm bullets blew to pieces the magnificent Pentium-100 with a real Intel processor."

The events of the story take place on Christmas Eve. Traditionally, the poetry of fateful mysteries and horrors predominates in the Christmas texts. The fantastic element in the story is tied directly to the computer virus: a special mystery surrounds the story of the virus infecting the computer, the malicious program appears out of nowhere. The alleged author of the virus – engineer Gerasimov – had no way to transfer the virus to the Mayor's computer: "Gerasimov has never appeared at the Mayor's office, and it is extremely doubtful that he could have infected his computer with such a virus through the Internet".

Thus, the reader is entitled to assume that this is a consequence of the intervention of supernatural forces – a necessary condition for the unfolding of the plot of the Christmas story. The author likens the computer virus (information weapon) to ancient incantation magic.
