= Methuselah's Lamp, or The Last Battle of the Chekists and Masons =

2016 novel by Victor Pelevin

- First edition
- Author: Victor Pelevin
- Language: Russian
- Genre: Novel
- Publication date: 2016
- Publication place: Russia
- Media type: Print (Paperback)
- Pages: 416 pp
- ISBN: 978-5-699-91778-5

Methuselah's Lamp, or The Last Battle of the Chekists and Masons (Russian: «Лампа Мафусаила, или Крайняя битва чекистов с масонами») is a novel by Victor Pelevin, first published in 2016.

The novel follows multiple generations of the Mozhaisky family, with the narrative spanning from the 19th century to the present day. Through an ironic lens, Pelevin explores Russia's complex international situation, using the lens of Freemasonry to illustrate these challenges.

== Plot ==
The novel consists of four parts. The first, "The Production Narrative," presents the memoirs of the trader Krimpai Mozhaysky, set in very recent times. The second, "Space Drama," is a long letter from his great-great-grandfather, Markian Mozhaysky, to his bride, written in the 1880s. The third, "Historical Essay," recounts the existence of a mysterious unit in the Gulag, where Krimpai’s great-grandfather, Methuselah, was imprisoned between the 1920s and the 1960s. The fourth, "Operational Etude," describes the out-of-body experience of an FSB general in modern times.

These parts interconnect, complement, and illuminate one another, constructing a vivid, albeit somewhat opaque, narrative. The central theme suggests that the ongoing confrontation between Russia and the West is orchestrated by higher forces controlling the world through Masonic groups. In contemporary Russia, the center of Freemasonry is portrayed as the FSB, while in the United States, Masonic power is said to be concentrated in the basement of the Federal Reserve building.

The first part follows Krimpai Mozhaysky, a trader with an obscene name (which he later changes to the patriotic "Crimea"), who is a gay double agent writing analytical reviews for both "liberals" and "Russian conservatives."

The second part, the largest section, is an essay about attempts to alter the history of aeronautics to reverse Russia’s technological lag behind the West. This section, mildly stylized as classical Russian literature, explores the eternal struggle between two forces—Civilization and Vata, Freemasons and Chekists, or, metaphorically, two powerful alien races: the Reptiloids, who oversee America, and the Beards, who protect Russia.

The third part, built on the archetypes of twentieth-century camp literature, tells the story of a special unit called "Templeag" on Novaya Zemlya. During the Stalin era, repressed Freemasons, under horrifying conditions, erected the Temple of Solomon—a powerful portal intended to facilitate the appearance of a deity in the world.

The fourth part, "Kapustin's Feat" (the most auteuristic of all), elegantly concludes the narrative, taking the eternal "Great Game" to a new phase while simultaneously explaining why the first part appears as a self-parody and a narrative failure.

Methuselah's Lamp offers numerous compelling observations and perspectives. For instance, if Pelevin’s perspective is to be believed, Russia has a great past and an equally great future, but its present is doomed. This is because the bearded race, the cosmic patrons of Russia, have been banished from the present by their reptiloid competitors and exist only in the past and the future.

The Western and Russian worlds, metaphorically represented as Civilization and Vata, are shown to be united by their love for the dollar—now backed by neither gold nor faith. In this perpetual struggle, the Chekist and the Freemason remain locked in an embrace, traversing a path that emerges from nowhere and inevitably leads to nowhere.
