= The Guest at the Fest of Bon =

2003 short story by Victor Pelevin

- Author: Victor Pelevin
- Language: Russian
- Genre: Short story
- Publication date: 2003
- Publication place: Russia
- Media type: Print (Paperback)
- ISBN: 5-699-03491-9

The Guest at the Fest of Bon (Russian: «Гость на празднике Бон») is a short story by Victor Pelevin, published in 2003.

== Plot ==
Pelevin's story is based on the theses of the samurai Jete Yamamoto ("Hagakure"), which express his view of life as an instant, saying that man is on the verge of death at every moment and that the way of the samurai is death. The story is written on behalf of the dying Yukio Mishima, a Japanese writer and playwright who continued the tradition of Japanese aestheticism.

That is why there is an underlying idea in the mind of the Bon-Samurai Yukio Mishima: everyone is just an object in this life. Man is a puppet with a mechanism created by a puppet master. The puppet plays out its first performance, then it disappears. And Yukio Mishima's head already rolls on the floor.

But there is no tragedy, death is true to the original concept: man is the master's thought, so one cannot kill the puppet and the puppet will not die; God the master simply ceases to play. Such a philosophy is a parent for the samurai, when he realizes that his youth has passed, the only thing left to do is not to kill his death in the old age and to tear up his life with his own hands. This philosophy is a consolation for those who have the thought of killing themselves and killing God: the human puppet after death becomes a spirit.

In other words, the life of the samurai is shown as a mignification: everyone is a puppet with a mechanism created by a puppet-master, man is the thought of God the master.

In the story there is a single Buddhist model of the world picture with its denial of the individual soul, the "self" of man. Here the negation of the self is elevated to a cult, and with the self, all its predicates, all objects and things that could fall under the denominator of the self are negated.

According to the doctrine of dharma, the ego can claim a certain status for its being through the moment of conditionality and the totality of the five elements, but at any moment this status can be destroyed because of the mutability and impermanence of this union of elements. This knowledge further reinforces the illusory nature of human existence.

The subject-oriented model of evaluation is the concept of contrast, according to which life is opposed to death, which is one of the fundamental foundations of human existence, but a peculiarity of Pelevin's language is that the concepts "life" and "death" act as contextual synonyms, which results in a shift of emphasis in the understanding of life and death. Thus the vowel hero of the story reflects: "All the roads on which she (the mystery) has met have been met with death. This means that the search for beauty ultimately led to death, that is, death and beauty turned out to be, in essence, the same thing".
