= Wind Search Record =

Short story by Viktor Pelevin

- Author: Victor Pelevin
- Language: Russian
- Genre: Short story
- Publication date: 2003
- Publication place: Russia
- Media type: Print (Paperback)
- ISBN: 5-699-03491-9

Wind Search Record (Russian: «Запись о поиске ветра») is a short story by Victor Pelevin, published in 2003.

== Plot ==
Victor Pelevin's works are characterized by numerous implicit references to various aspects of Chinese literature and culture. There are also texts explicitly devoted to Chinese philosophy, and this story is one of them, written in the spirit of Eastern philosophical narratives that appeal to various semiotic codes and simulacra that substitute reality, but do not seriously assert the validity of these codes and images.

The narrative is written in the form of an Eastern letter on behalf of a Chinese student of Gradual Ordering to his teacher named Elegance of Wisdom. The narrative traces an obvious orientation to the stereotypical notion of the epistolary genre.

The story is told that a sage living on a holy mountain treats his disciple to a powder of five stones, after which the disciple has a miraculous stream of consciousness. He tries to write a literary work about comprehending the Way and ends up thinking that any addition of another symbol (image, word) will move him further and further away from the truth. All this resembles a treatise of Taoist philosophy transformed by the author into a story.

In the story, the principle of the mapping of reality, meaning, and signification, obscured by a multitude of signifiers, is interpreted by an ancient Chinese man and takes on the status of a Buddhist truth: "The most monstrous conspiracy that ever existed in the Middle Kingdom was revealed to me... The world is but a reflection of the hieroglyphs. But the hieroglyphs that make it up do not indicate anything real and only reflect each other, for one sign is always defined by another. This transcoding of Western theory appeared to be mystical and "Oriental" in a sudden way after the use of some suspicious remedy.

Researchers of the writer's work conclude that the key word "way" in Pelevin's story is directly related to the main concept of the Taoist doctrine, the "Tao".

Lao Tzu believes that the nature of the Way and the highest level of practice is to achieve "ultimate impartiality" and to preserve "peace," which is the essence of life. All material things only conform to nature and preserve inner peace in order to obtain infinite vitality. The concept of "all things" in this case implies man as well. Pelevin interprets this idea in his own way: his hero believes that "one should not strive too much for peace; both peace and excitement are manifestations of the same thing.

"Refusal to use arms" in the protagonist's reflections points to a specific way of following the principles of nature. The story says that the constructions of the mind can be likened to ladders, but it is impossible to climb these ladders to the castle of truth, nor even to approach the truth. From this point of view, the ladder is the "tool" we want to use.

Pelevin has it that "the longer our ladders are, the higher the walls will become. When we lower the ladder and no longer intend to storm the castle, the castle of truth will disappear. "Refusing to use weapons" will help us learn the truth.
