= The Origin of Species (short story) =

1993 short story by Victor Pelevin

- Short story by Victor Pelevin
- Country: Russia
- Language: Russian

Publication
- Media type: Print (Paperback)
- Publication date: 1993

The Origin of Species (Russian: «Происхождение видов») is a 1993 short story by Victor Pelevin.

== Plot ==
The title of the story, "The Origin of Species," refers the reader to the major life work of Charles Darwin, the founder of the all-conquering doctrine of the origin of species, who was a cult figure in Soviet society. In the materialistic and atheistic society that was the Soviet Union, Charles Darwin's theory of evolution was attributed a major role. The author of the theory himself seemed to be a cult figure, as the founder of the all-conquering doctrine of the origin of species as opposed to the divine creation of the world.

In this cultural context, the absurdist atmosphere of Pelevin's story becomes clear. In the story, Darwin travels on the brig Beagle in the general adulation of the crew on a scientific expedition. The bosun follows him with a bucket of frozen champagne bottles.

All the attention of the captain and crew is directed to Darwin's great experiments on the theory of evolution. However, the venerable scientist does not limit himself to naked speculation in his research - with his sleeves rolled up, he summons another primate to his hold, to be tested in the wild and to study the origin of species in practice.

The hero of the story, Darwin, is let inside the ship, where they let the monkeys in, in physical combat with some of them, proving that the struggle for existence survives the strongest.

The consequence of the seizure is animal corpses and two concepts of the past. The natural-scientific theory interprets the "irreconcilable struggle for life" as "simply the interaction of the two atoms of existence, a kind of chemical reaction", which is inexplicable in its senselessness: "In fact, we are the cells of one immortal creature, continuously devouring itself.

The poetic version looks particularly ironic against the background of the naturalistic reproduction of the bloody details of meaningless murder: "Existence is such a beautiful thing, isn't it? But only combat is capable of making that existence tangible. A merciless, brutal fight for the right to breathe this air, to look at it, to look at the moray of these people.

The world is conceived in terms of absence; it depicts something that does not exist, has not been, and probably will not exist. And the conflict is as simulacrumatic as anything else. "The fierce and merciless battle for existence in this cruel world" is reproduced as a false myth, like the origin of man from an ape.

However, if only the reality of the bodily beginning is acknowledged and the spiritual one is questioned, then the distinction between man and monkey becomes undefined. Pelevinsky Darwin, as one would expect from a natural-scientific legend, senses a non-human beginning in the beast. In Darwin's Origin of Species, a classic work, the origin of species through natural selection, or the preservation of favored breeds in the struggle for life, is represented as the consequence of a "scientific" experiment.
