= The Life of Insects =

1993 book by Victor Pelevin

- Author: Victor Pelevin
- Language: Russian
- Genre: Novel
- Publication date: 1993
- Publication place: Russia
- Media type: Print (Paperback)
- Pages: 176 pp
- ISBN: 0571194052

The Life of Insects (Russian: «Жизнь насекомых») is a novel by Victor Pelevin first published in 1993. The novel consists of 15 chapters.

== Plot ==
The novel is set in the early 1990s in the Crimea. All the characters in the novel are both human (racketeers, drug addicts, mystics, prostitutes) and insects.

The characters chosen by the author are typical representatives of the society of the early 1990s. But this dating does not play a role in itself because the types chosen are quite universal and suitable for all periods. The book has deep connotations with the teachings of Carlos Castaneda, Marcus Aurelius and Buddhism.

The book consists of fifteen inter-related stories with characters and incidents recurring, albeit in different contexts and from different viewpoints. The heroes of these short stories appear in the first pages as ordinary beings who could be human. Then Pelevine describes details that shows them as insects.

The first publication of the novel was in the magazine Znamya in 1993. The author was awarded the 1993 Znamia magazine prize for "the best work on the life and exceptional adventures of democracy in Russia". This prize is traditionally awarded by the magazine to one of its own best publications, with sponsorship from Materik Publishing. Published in English in 1996.

== The protagonists ==
=== Mosquitoes ===
Two Russian mosquitoes, Arthur and Arnold, must meet an American mosquito, Sam. Sam is familiar with Russia; he speaks excellent Russian.

The solidarity for all three mosquitoes is human blood. Sucking blood is both an important leisure, work, vocation, and passion for these characters. Sam flies to Russia to collect new blood samples. The mosquitoes set out for their prey.

The blood Sam tasted turned out to be a big problem for him. The American was immediately intoxicated by the cologne contained in the host's blood.

An introduction to the mosquito Archibald takes place. The latter does not suck blood like a normal mosquito, but consumes it from the laboratory in canned form, by the glass. The task of the companions is to bring Archibald back to normal mosquito life, where mosquitoes drink blood on the hunt. Along the way, Archibald has an accident; he is killed by a fly, Natasha, as he tries to suck on her leg.

=== Scarab beetles ===
Scarab beetles - Father and son. The main thing in their lives is dung (in the human world, money).

The scarab beetle son cannot understand this dualism: how a ball of dung can be both the ball he pushes in front of him and the ball on which he is stuck, which rolls on its own to who knows where. The intermittent moment when the scarabs stuck in the muck find themselves beneath their rolling ball is a dream. They themselves perceive the phenomenon as if, from time to time, a concrete slab were coming over their eyes. When the concrete slab pulls away from their eyes, the scarabs wake up.

The scarab father teaches his son his own philosophical system for years until he dies, killed by a woman's shoe.

=== Ants ===
The main characters in this line are the flying ant Marina, the murai lion, Major Nikolai, and their daughter, the fly Natasha.

Marina arrives from somewhere unknown and lands on an embankment. She does not know what she wants. She is just like everyone else. So to begin with she does what all the females around her do: she saws off her wings with a file, then goes to the cinema, watches some foreign films there and falls in love with some foreign actor. She wants everything in her life to go the way it's shown in those films.

When she leaves the cinema, she goes to dig a hole for herself. She digs and settles down in it. After some time, Nikolai digs a hole in her burrow. They begin to live together in the burrow, which is in Magadan.

Nikolai hurries: while his wife is not completely fat and can still get out of the burrow, he should take her to the theater. In the theater, Nikolai dies unexpectedly, his coworkers saw his corpse to pieces. Marina brings some of these pieces with her to the burrow. In the burrow, she rapidly becomes fat, almost losing the ability to move. But now Marina becomes a mother. Here, her daughter Natasha hatches from an egg.

Marina's wish is to raise her daughter a worker of culture, so all her childhood Natasha learns to play the accordion, which was inherited from her late father. Natasha's fate will turn out differently than her mother wished and she will become a fly (prostitute). From now on, a wall is formed between her and her mother. She becomes acquainted with Sam the mosquito, once even bringing him home.

Natasha complains to Sam about her hard life. The flies have no rights, they are poisoned with chemicals. She dreams of going to America with him.

But Natasha's dreams are not destined to come true. At the end of the novel, she dies in front of Sam by sticking to duct tape in a restaurant.

=== Night Moths ===
The next storyline of the novel: the lives of night moths Dima and Mitya. They strive for light, but cannot understand what is light, what is darkness, and whether light really exists.

At a certain point, Dima and Mitya understand that they, not moths, but fireflies, and thus are a source of light themselves, but are forced to always be in the dark. And it is desirable that no one would guess that they are a bright source of light, other than which there is nothing in the world.

At the end of the novel Mitya has to fight his own corpse, but who fights whom and who triumphs remains undisclosed.

=== Hemp Bugs ===
Maxim and Nikita in the world of insects are hemp bedbugs (addicts). Hemp bugs are so small that many addicts mistake them for small crap that cracks as they smoke. But some addicts know that they are not trash, but small bugs, and believe in the omen that if the bugs try to get out of the mix and run away somewhere, it means that the cops are about to come and it's time to run away from them themselves. Nikita knows all of this. He tells Maxim about all this when he stops by to visit him. The friends chat and go off on their drug dealings.

On the way they run into some cops. Nikita and Maxim hide from them in a wide pipe. In the world of insects, this pipe turns out to be a cigarette, a joint. The joint is lit and smoked. Before he dies, Maxim appeals to God and is told by God that he is not to blame. (In the human world, Sam smoked a cigarette, and the words that Maxim heard, thinking that it was God’s answer, were Sam’s words addressed to Natasha).

=== Cockroach ===
Seryozha hatches from the egg, falls from the tree to the ground, and digs into the ground. His main occupation is to dig deep into the ground, which is what he will do his whole life. He digs when he has to go to work, and when he returns from work, he digs what he can to get home.

The purpose of his life is to dig up as much money as possible, and he fulfills it. Seryozha's big fear is to remain a cockroach in his homeland, and he digs his way to America. In America, Seryozha is incessantly busy digging. Despite his best efforts, he transforms into an old American cockroach. In his old age, the hero realizes that he has to dig exclusively upwards - this leads him to the surface of the earth. At this point, Seryozha transforms into a cicada from a cockroach. He gets wings and begins to dig the air with them as a matter of habit. Here is a replay of the evening where the hero is born from an egg. The reader understands that nothing else has simply ever happened.
