= Victor Pelevin =

Russian fiction writer (born 1962)

- Виктор Пелевин
- Born: Victor Olegovich Pelevin; 22 November 1962 (age 63); Moscow, Soviet Union
- Citizenship: Russian
- Education: Moscow Power Engineering Institute
- Occupation: Writer
- Writing career
- Language: Russian, English
- Years active: 1989–present
- Period: Contemporary
- Genres: Novel; novella; short story; essay
- Subject: Unfreedom
- Notable works: Chapayev and Void (1996), Generation P (1999)
- Notable awards: Multiple
- Movement: Russian postmodernism

Victor Olegovich Pelevin (Russian: Виктор Олегович Пелевин, IPA: [ˈvʲiktər ɐˈlʲeɡəvʲɪtɕ pʲɪˈlʲevʲɪn]; born 22 November 1962) is a Russian fiction writer. His novels include Omon Ra (1992), The Life of Insects (1993), Chapayev and Void (1996), and Generation P (1999). He is a laureate of multiple literary awards including the Russian Little Booker Prize (1993) and the Russian National Bestseller (2004), the former for the short story collection The Blue Lantern (1991). In 2011 he was nominated for the Nobel prize in Literature. His books are multi-layered postmodernist texts fusing elements of pop culture and esoteric philosophies while carrying conventions of the science fiction genre. His early work merged postmodernism with Buddhism and ironic political critiques of conservatism and liberalism. His later work builds upon a foundation of post-modernism, but critiques the movement's lack of grand narratives, while also incorporating humanist philosophy. Some critics relate his prose to the New sincerity literary movement.

== Biography ==
Victor Olegovich Pelevin was born in Moscow on 22 November 1962 to Zinaida Semenovna Efremova, an English teacher, and Oleg Anatolyevich Pelevin, a teacher at the military department of Bauman University. He lived on Tverskoy Boulevard in Moscow, later moving to Chertanovo. In 1979, Pelevin graduated from an elite high school with a special English program located on Stanislavskogo Street in the centre of Moscow, now Kaptsov Gymnasium #1520.

He then attended the Moscow Power Engineering Institute (MPEI) graduating with a degree in electromechanical engineering in 1985. In April of that year, MPEI Department of Electrical Transport hired him as engineer. Pelevin served in the Russian Air Force. From 1987 to 1989, Pelevin attended the MPEI graduate school.

Pelevin travels to Asia often and has been to Nepal, South Korea, China and Japan. While he does not call himself a Buddhist, he is engaged in Buddhist practices. Pelevin has repeatedly said that despite the fact that his characters use drugs, he is not an addict even though he experimented with mind-expanding substances in his youth. Pelevin is not married.

Pelevin has no current or past public social media accounts (e.g. Facebook, Twitter, VKontakte).

In December 2018, the media reported that the writer Victor Pelevin registered in the register of individual entrepreneurs in the territorial office of the Pension Fund in Moscow.

== Literary career ==
In 1989, Pelevin attended Mikhail Lobanov's creative writing seminar at Maxim Gorky Literary Institute. While studying at the Institute, Pelevin met the young novelist Albert Egazarov and the poet Victor Kulle, later a literary critic. Pelevin was expelled from the Institute in 1991. Egazarov and Kulle went on to found a publishing house, first called The Day, then The Raven and Myth, for which Pelevin has edited three volumes of Carlos Castaneda's work.

From 1989 to 1990, Pelevin worked as a staff reporter for the magazine Face to Face. In 1989, he also began to work in the journal Nauka i Religiya (Science and Religion), where he edited a series of articles on eastern mysticism. In 1989, Nauka i Religiya published Pelevin's first short story "The Sorcerer Ignat and People".

In 1991, Pelevin published his first collection of stories The Blue Lantern. Two years later, it received the Russian Little Booker Prize. In 1994, it received InterPressCon and the Bronze Snail awards. In March 1992, Pelevin published his first novel Omon Ra in the literary journal Znamya. The novel attracted the attention of literary critics and was nominated for the Booker Prize. In April 1993, the same journal published Pelevin's next novel The Life of Insects. In 1993, Pelevin published an essay "John Fowles and the tragedy of Russian liberalism" in Nezavisimaya Gazeta. The essay was the writer's answer to some negative critics' reactions to his work. In the same year, Pelevin was admitted to the Russian Union of Journalists.

In 1996, Pelevin participated in the International Writing Program residency at the University of Iowa. That same year, Znamya published Pelevin's novel Chapayev and Void. Critics called it "the first Zen Buddhist novel in Russian". The writer himself called it "the first novel which takes place in an absolute vacuum". In 1997, the novel won Strannik Literary Award for science fiction, and in 2001 it was shortlisted for the International Dublin Literary Award.

In 1999, Pelevin's novel Generation P was published. Over 3.5 million copies have been sold worldwide. The book received a number of awards including Germany's Richard Schoenfeld Prize.

In 2003, Pelevin published the novel The Dialectics of Transition Period from Out of Nowhere to Nowhere or DTP (NN), receiving the Apollon Grigoryev Prize in 2003 and the National Bestseller award in 2004. DTP (NN) was also shortlisted for the Andrei Bely Prize in 2003.

In 2006, Eksmo published Pelevin's novel Empire V. The novel was shortlisted for the Russian Big Book award. The text of Empire V appeared on the Internet even before the publication of the novel. Representatives of Eksmo claimed that it was a result of a theft, but some speculated that it was a marketing ploy.

In October 2009, the novel t was published. The author received the third award of the fifth season of the Big Book award (2009–2010) and won the reader choice vote.

In December 2011, Eksmo released Pelevin's novel S.N.U.F.F. which received the E-book award for "Prose of the Year" in February 2012.

Literary critics have noted Pelevin's postmodernist and absurdist styles, which incorporate Buddhist motifs, esoteric traditions, and satirical science fiction. Pelevin's books have been translated into many languages including Japanese and Chinese. In 2009, the French magazine chose Pelevin as one of the 1,000 most significant people in contemporary culture. A 2009 OpenSpace.ru survey voted Pelevin as the most influential intellectual in Russia.

Pelevin is known for not being a part of the literary crowd, rarely appearing in public or giving interviews and preferring to communicate on the internet. When he gives interviews, he talks more about the nature of his mind rather than his writings. This has given grounds for various rumours. For instance, it has been suggested that the writer does not exist and Pelevin is actually a code name for a group of authors or even a computer.

In May 2011, it was reported that Pelevin would personally attend the award ceremony SuperNatsBest, which would have been the writer's first appearance in public. However, he did not come.

Pelevin has permitted all of his texts in Russian predating 2009 (except P5: Farewell songs of the political pygmies of Pindostan) to be published on the Internet for non-commercial use. Some novels are also available as audio files in Russian.

In December 2010, he wrote a collection of novels and short stories "Pineapple Water for the Fair Lady", which was in the long list of the Russian Literary Award "Big Book" (season 2010/11).

In March 2013, Pelevin's eleventh novel "Batman Apollo" was released, which is a sequel to "Empire V". Then came the novels "Love for Three Zuckerbrins" (2014), "The Caretaker" (2015), "Methuselah's Lamp, or The Last Battle of the Chekists and Masons" (2016).

In 2017, the novel "iPhuck 10" was published, which won the Andrew White Prize. In 2018, the novel "Secret Views of Mount Fuji" was released. "The Art of Light Touches" was released in August 2019. In August 2020, the novel "The Invincible Sun" was published.

For the past nine years, the author has been releasing one book a year, it can be a novel or a collection of stories united by a common theme. In the fall of 2021 the book "Transhumanism Inc." was published, which is a collection of stories united by the theme of the concept of transhumanism.

In September 2022, the novel “KGBT+” was published, which is a sequel to the previous novel “Transhumanism Inc.”.

In November 2022, the documentary film Pelevin directed by Rodion Chepel was released. The author studied archives and early works of Pelevin, interviewed the writer's acquaintances, his childhood friends, colleagues and researchers of the writer's work.

In 2023, the novel “Journey to Eleusin” was published. It also became the sequel to two previous novels, “KGBT+” and “Transhumanism Inc.”.

In September 2024, it was revealed that Victor Pelevin will release a new novel "Krut'". Sales of the new book started on October 3, 2024.

In September 2025, Viсtor Pelevin's new novel, "A Sinistra", was published. Sales in bookstores and online began on September 18, 2025.

== Literary style ==
Pelevin's prose, creating a mythologized and multi-layered picture of reality, is built on the interweaving of the fantastic and the real, the historical and the fictional. In the spirit of postmodernism, it abounds in hidden quotations, allusions, the game semantic clichés, and irony. Buddhist symbolism neighbours in it with occultism, European philosophy with mysticism, didacticism with parody, and active presence of realities of modern culture with an appeal to archaic consciousness. But, he employs postmodernist devices for humanistic ethos.

Pelevin's works are characterized by the mixing of elements of different genres — adventure novel and parable, fairy tale and anecdote, pamphlet and utopia.

In a conversation with BOMB Magazine, Pelevin named Russian author Mikhail Bulgakov's The Master and Margarita as an early influence on his reading, saying, "The effect of this book was really fantastic. [...] This book was totally out of the Soviet world." Pelevin avoids, however, listing authors who have specifically influenced his writing, for he believes that "the only real Russian literary tradition is to write good books in a way nobody did before."

== Selected bibliography ==
=== Novels ===
- Omon Ra / Омон Ра (1992)
- The Life of Insects / Жизнь насекомых (1993)
- Buddha's Little Finger (aka Clay Machine-Gun) / Чапаев и Пустота (Chapayev and Void) (1996)
- Generation "P" (aka Babylon, Homo Zapiens) / Generation "П" (1999)
- Numbers (as part of the book DTP(NN) - The Dialectics of the Transition Period (from Nowhere to No Place) / ДПП(NN) - Диалектика Переходного Периода (из Ниоткуда в Никуда)) / Числа (2004)
- The Sacred Book of the Werewolf / Священная Книга Оборотня (2004)
- The Helmet of Horror / Шлем ужаса (2005)
- Empire V / Ампир В (2006)
- t (2009)
- S.N.U.F.F. (2011)
- Batman Apollo (2013)
- Love for three Zuckerbrins / Любовь к трём Цукербринам (2014)
- The Caretaker / Смотритель (2015)
- Methuselah's Lamp, or The Last Battle of the Chekists and Masons / Лампа Мафусаила, или Крайняя битва чекистов с масонами (2016)
- iPhuck 10 (2017)
- Secret Views of Mount Fuji / Тайные виды на гору Фудзи (2018)
- The Art of Light Touches / Искусство лёгких касаний (2019)
- Sol Invictus (Unconquered Sun) / Непобедимое солнце (2020)
- Transhumanism Inc. (2021)
- KGBT+ (2022)
- Journey to Eleusis / Путешествие в Элевсин (2023)
- Krut’ / Круть (2024)
- A Sinistra (2025)
- The Return of the Bluebeard / Возвращение Синей Бороды (2026)

=== Short story collection ===
- Blue Lantern and Other Stories / Синий фонарь (1991)
- 4 by Pelevin (2001)
- P5: Farewell songs of the political pygmies of Pindostan / П5: прощальные песни политических пигмеев Пиндостана (2008)
- Pineapple Water for the Fair Lady / Ананасная вода для прекрасной дамы (2010)

=== Short stories ===
- The Sorcerer Ignat and People / Колдун Игнат и люди (1989)
- The Water Tower / Водонапорная башня (1990)
- Hermit and Six-Toes / Затворник и Шестипалый (1990)
- The Reconstructor / Реконструктор (1990)
- Weapon of Retaliation / Оружие возмездия (1990)
- The Life and Adventure of Shed Number XII / Жизнь и приключения сарая Номер XII (1991)
- A Werewolf Problem in Central Russia / Проблема верволка в средней полосе (1991)
- Prince of Central Planning / Принц Госплана (1991)
- Sleep / Спи (1991)
- News from Nepal / Вести из Непала (1991)
- Vera Pavlovna's Ninth Dream / Девятый сон Веры Павловны (1991)
- Blue Lantern / Синий фонарь (1991)
- Tai Shou Chuan USSR / СССР Тайшоу Чжуань. Китайская народная сказка (1991)
- Mardongi / Мардонги (1991)
- Bulldozer Driver's Day / День бульдозериста (1991)
- The Ontology of Childhood / Онтология детства (1991)
- Built-in Reminder / Встроенный напоминатель (1991)
- Mid-Game / Миттельшпиль (1991)
- The Yellow Arrow / Желтая стрела (1993)
- Crystal World / Хрустальный мир (1991)
- Uhryab / Ухряб (1991)
- Music from the Pillar / Музыка со столба (1991)
- Kreger’s Revelation / Откровение Крегера (1991)
- Nika / Ника (1992)
- The Tambourine of the Upper World / Бубен Верхнего мира (1993)
- The Tambourine of the Lower World / Бубен Нижнего мира (1993)
- Sigmund in a Cafe / Зигмунд в кафе (1993)
- The Origin of Species / Происхождение видов (1993)
- Ivan Kublakhanov / Иван Кублаханов (1994)
- The Tarzan Swing / Тарзанка (1994)
- Xmas Cyberpunk, or Christmas Night-117.DIR / Святочный киберпанк, или Рождественская Ночь-117.DIR (1996)
- The Greek Version / Греческий вариант (1997)
- A Concise History of Paintball in Moscow / Краткая история пэйнтбола в Москве (1997)
- The Low Tundra / Нижняя тундра (1999)
- Time Out / Тайм-аут, или Вечерняя Москва (2001)
- Macedonian Criticism of French Thought / Македонская критика французской мысли (2003)
- Wind Search Record / Запись о поиске ветра (2003)
- The Guest at the Fest of Bon / Гость на празднике Бон (2003)
- One Vogue / Один вог (2003)
- Who by fire / Who by fire (2005)

=== Essays ===
- Zombification / Зомбификация (1990)
- Fortune telling with Runes / Гадание на рунах (1990)
- GKChP as the Tetragrammaton / ГКЧП как Тетраграмматон (1993)
- John Fowles and the Tragedy of Russian Liberalism / Джон Фаулз и трагедия русского либерализма (1993)
- Ixtlan - Petushki / Икстлан — Петушки (1993)
- The Names of Oligarchs on the Map of the Homeland / Имена олигархов на карте Родины (1998)
- The Warrior's Last Joke / Последняя шутка воина (1998)

== Sources printed ==
- Khagi, Sofya (2021). Pelevin and Unfreedom: Poetics, Politics, Metaphisics. Studies in Russian Literature and Theory. Evanston, Il: Northwestern University Press. ISBN 9780810143036.
- Mørch, Audun J.. "Reality as Myth: Pelevin's Čapaev i Pustota", in: Scando-Slavica. Vol. 51. No.1. (2005): 61–79.
- Orthofer, M. A.. The Complete Review Guide to Contemporary World Fiction. Columbia University Press, 2016. ISBN 9780231518505. ISBN 0231518501.
- Yurchak, Alexei. Everything Was Forever, Until It Was No More: The Last Soviet Generation. — Princeton University Press, 2013. ISBN 9781400849109. ISBN 1400849101.
