= Nika (short story) =

Short story by Viktor Pelevin

- Author: Victor Pelevin
- Language: Russian
- Genre: Short story
- Publication date: 1992
- Publication place: Russia
- Media type: Print (Paperback)
- ISBN: 0811214346

Nika (Russian: «Ника») is a short story by Victor Pelevin, published in 1992.

== Plot ==
This story can be classified as a mystery story, in which it is initially impossible to determine the essence of what is happening, to identify the characters, and to read the plot episodes unambiguously. Only as the reader perceives it, at one point or another, does the reader receive indications and details that allow him to adequately understand what is being portrayed.

In the first paragraph of the story, in one sentence, Pelevin directs the initial reader's perception along a false path. This is accomplished through two references to Ivan Bunin. First, the phrase "easy breath" is used, which has become a symbol of tragic love in Russian literature since Bunin's classic story. In Pelevin's story the author, on whose behalf the story is written, does not accidentally reflect on the vicissitudes of love: on his "lap lies Bunin's heavy, like a silicate brick, volume", tearing himself from reading it he looks at the wall with an accidentally preserved photograph, apparently of his beloved.

The past tense of the narrative points to the loss, and then the reader is given a detailed characterization, speculating on the life story of a certain Veronica, whom the hero abbreviates as Nika. However, the lack of "love," as such, is disturbing in the story. The relationship between the characters is designated as "affection," described in terms of physiology.

Nika gets a slap for the broken antique sugar bowl, which is dear to the hero as a memory and piggy bank, where he kept various papers – proof of the reality of his human existence. After the quarrel, the hero feels guilty and confused trying to explain himself, and in the evening he becomes especially affectionate to Nika. The hero does not manage to penetrate into Nika's world, although he is truly interested in it, because the heroine is constantly silent, does not read books, does not keep a diary, dozing for long hours at the TV, almost not looking at the screen. Her interests do not go beyond pure physiology.

Trying to imagine what is going on in her head, the hero tries to understand what attracts Nika to the landscape outside the window, which she looks at, sitting by the window for hours. Nika's space is limited to an ordinary Moscow courtyard – a sandpit and a log hut for children's games, a barstool on which carpets were beaten out, a strange plague frame welded from metal pipes, a garbage dump and lanterns. Nicky's space is enlarged by the nearby forest, in which she loved to walk alone.

The heroine's intellectual virginity frees her from "the humiliating need to relate the flames over the garbage can to the Moscow fire of 1737," that is, she is deprived of the ability to see the causal and temporal connections between events.

The hero, with whom nothing new has happened for a long time, "hoped, being near Nika, to see some unfamiliar ways of feeling and living. However, he realized that by looking out the window, Nika "sees simply what is there, and that her mind is not at all inclined to travel through the past and the future, but is content with the present.

The hero had to realize that he was not dealing with a real Nika, but with a set of his own thoughts, that Nika was his "perceptions which had taken her form. Further, in addition to the temporal discrepancies that exist between them, the hero denotes the spatial incompatibility of the relationship, because "Nika, sitting half a meter away from me, is as inaccessible as the top of the Spasskaya Tower."

Pelevin relates the unraveling of Nika's essence almost to the plot's denouement: only after her death right in the yard under the wheels of a car does it become clear that Nika is a Siamese cat. As a result, in hindsight, the reader realizes that the story contains two incompatible worlds, whose time and space intersect, but whose connections between them are almost non-existent. This shared world of man and cat is chaotic because it is impossible to account for the myriad factors that remain unpredictable.
