= Empire V =

Novel by Victor Pelevin

- Cover
- Author: Victor Pelevin
- Language: Russian
- Genre: Novel
- Publication date: 2006
- Publication place: Russia
- Media type: Print (Paperback)
- Pages: 400 pp
- ISBN: 147321307X

Empire V (Russian: «Ампир В. Повесть о настоящем сверхчеловеке») is a novel by Victor Pelevin first published in 2006.

The title is a wordplay. The word Empire in the original title in Russian stands for Empire style (French pronunciation: [ɑ̃.piːʁ]), which is in Russian is written the way matching the French pronunciation (ампир), rather than the translation of the word empire in the sense "a powerful state or a gang", which is империя. The letter V is a Roman numeral. If one swaps the words and removes the whitespace, he gets the word "вампир", that means "a vampire". Like the title of another Pelevin's novel, Generation "П", the letter V can also have the meaning of Pelevin's initials.

The second part of the original title, A Story About a Real Uberman (Повесть о настоящем сверхчеловеке) is a tribute to A Story About a Real Man (Повесть о настоящем человеке), a real-life-based patriotic story well known within Russia and Soviet Union about an ace pilot Aleksey Maresyev who was doing dogfight having his feet amputated during WW2. Another reference to this pilot is present in Omon Ra story.

Empire V is set in modern times, and the protagonist, on whose behalf the story is being told, is about 20 years old. The corporations ("The Fifth Empire") and corporate culture occupy a special place in Empire V.

The novel is about vampires, but in a different way than in the traditional one. In Pelevin's works, vampires are the ruling elite of the world, "The Fifth Empire", which once created man from an ape. The vampires' food, however, is not blood, but "bablos", the higher state of money that humans produce with their "money gland," and it is the seal of human vitality. The people themselves are unaware of all this, and the vampires rule them with glamour and discourse. Glamour seeks to make people feel inferior, and so they constantly seek and spend money on what the glossy advertisements offer. Discourse, in turn, limits people's thinking, so that they do not begin to approach the truth about the true order of the world.

The satire of the novel is addressed primarily to Russians who have joined the consumerist feast spread by advertising; indeed, the pages of the book say that the spirituality of Russian life lies in convexity. The Russian is in no way trying to show that he is better than others with this bulge, but exactly like others. But Pelevin also takes his critique to a higher level, to apply in a broader sense to all world thinking, that monetary production becomes "the only morality, value and goal".

== Plot ==
A young man named Roman Aleksandrovich Shtorkin becomes a vampire. This happens when Roman accidentally meets another vampire, Brama, who decided to kill himself after a vampire duel. But before he does, he is obliged to give the other man his "tongue" – the special essence that makes a person a vampire. With the help of the "tongue", a vampire can read the mind of a human or another vampire by tasting their blood; as vampires say, "tasting".

This is how Roman becomes a vampire. Having changed his name to Rama according to vampire tradition, he must now change his way of thinking. To do this, like every young vampire, he takes a course in the two main vampire sciences: glamour and discourse. The vampire's socialization is paradoxical: on the one hand, he was and, to some extent, remains human. On the other hand, he becomes a vampire, who must by nature control glamour and discourse instead of succumbing to it. For the vampire, this is the primary way to control humanity and, at the same time, to feed on it.

Rama quickly settles into vampire society. Gradually he becomes more and more accustomed to the fact that all his new acquaintances and himself bear the names of gods, that the word "blood" is indecent to say aloud, and that he is no longer human. Vampire society lives with little overlap with human society and is built on values that have nothing to do with humanity. At the same time, humanity is pervaded by vampire agents, the "Chaldeans", who set the cultural and social direction the vampires want. A vampire can have a full love relationship only with his own kind, and the book describes Rama's complicated relationship with a new vampire named Hera.

Rama learns that, contrary to everything that is said, written and filmed about vampires, they are a special race of symbiote creatures whose vampiric part, the "tongue", passes from host to host over time. The ability to read a person's mind allows vampires to control people, and the control of discourse and glamour allows them to do the same with the entire society. Actually, the main goal of any vampire is to control humanity, the main means being the tasting of the "red liquid".

Rama's life after his conversion consists of more than study. He struggles with being a vampire, pondering the eternal questions, "Where did the world come from?", "What happens after death?", "What is truth?", "What is God?", and actively seeking answers to them. Trying to understand what is happening to him, he takes notes, which make up the book. The older vampires consider such feelings to be a common, empty bliss for young people, but this does not stop Rama, who tries to learn more about the meaning of his life, now – the life of a vampire. Osiris, an atypical vampire-Tolstoyan, provides some help.

At the end of the novel it turns out that Rama was left undertrained on purpose, but that is what allowed him to remain more human than vampire.

== Analysis ==
The world of vampires in the novel is only a backdrop, the presence of which is due, among other things, to the trends prevailing in popular culture at the time of the novel's writing.

In fact, the supernatural component can be removed without losing its meaning, and then it turns out that Pelevin is simply describing modern society. The vampires are the world's elite, the main beneficiaries of consumer society. People are the "plebs," who provide the basis for the elites' comfortable existence.

It is thanks to the "plebs" that the elites are constantly sucking up money. Well, the Chaldeans are the ideologists of all this outrage, standing in the service of the elites and influencing the minds of the plebs with the help of the media. The permanent brainwashing does not allow us to go beyond the existing paradigm of thinking. The result is a rather believable and skillful reflection of reality, which is what art is supposed to do.

The described state of affairs has a philosophical basis. The key concepts are the previously mentioned discourse and glamour, the content of which is disclosed in some detail in the novel (although no clear definitions are given).

The novel also raises fundamental ontological questions, an attempt to answer which is made through the description of the structure and peculiarities of the human brain.

== Adaptation ==
The novel was adapted into a film directed by Victor Ginzburg and starring Pavel Tabakov alongside Oxxxymiron. It will premier at the Fantasia International Film Festival in July 2023. The Russian government refused to release a distribution permit for the film in 2022, effectively banning it in the country.
