= Secret Views of Mount Fuji =

Novel

- First edition
- Author: Victor Pelevin
- Original title: Тайные виды на гору Фудзи
- Language: Russian
- Genre: Novel
- Publication date: 2018
- Publication place: Russia
- Media type: Print (Paperback)
- Pages: 416 pp
- ISBN: 978-5-04-099583-7

Secret Views of Mount Fuji (Russian: «Тайные виды на гору Фудзи») is a novel by Victor Pelevin first published in 2018.

In the novel the writer formulates and preaches Buddhist philosophical principles. The plot is based on the story of a businessman named Fedya, who has experienced all the joys of life and begins to use a startup that offers different kinds of happiness.

== Plot ==
Businessman Fedya (last or penultimate on the Forbes list, with enough wealth for a yacht, women, and cocaine) has lost interest in material pursuits; the goals he sought in youth and achieved in maturity no longer hold appeal or meaning for him.

Soon he meets a young man named Damian with a suitcase in his hand and an offer that his master is unable to refuse. Damian is the creator of a startup that offers very wealthy people happiness ranging from the fulfillment of childhood fantasies to sophisticated transcendent experiences.

The first experience of expensive luxury happiness returns to Fedya's life the object of his adolescent Erotic Dreams, which managed over the years to turn into an ugly middle-aged woman named Tanya.

In parallel, the author sets out in some detail the Buddhist theory of jhāna – the successive stages of deep meditative absorption.

Damian has many more opportunities to make his clients feel good, but they are all based in one way or another on erotic fantasies. And Fyodor Semyonovich wants not inventive sex, but happiness. And then Damian discharges Buddhist monks who, with the help of a device, guide the businessman and his two buddies through the four jhānas – that is, levels of meditative absorption. But there is a serious side effect: those who have passed the four jhānas and experienced the bliss of them and various insights that they can give rise to cease to be interested in worldly pursuits.

When the monks, afraid that their subjects will use jhānas for selfish purposes, hastily leave, it suddenly turns out that the businessmen have not only lost money – they have lost the one who owns the money, i.e., themselves. And that envy, lust, hatred, contempt, greed – that is, the happiness of this world and of a normal person. And they begin a feverish march in the opposite direction from enlightenment.

Leading the hero (and with him the reader) through different types of mental states, Pelevin for the first time in his work is absolutely direct and seriously, without sarcasm and humor begins to preach Buddhist philosophical principles. And the hero of the novel, the hedonist Fedya, in this context serves as a negative example, designed to fully demonstrate to the reader the shame and abomination of defeat on the spiritual path.

Another storyline of the novel is Tanya's life. Who, after meeting Fedya, undergoes a genuine mystical transformation. But, unlike the weak-willed Fedya, she goes her own way, leading in the exact opposite direction – gaining in the end a terrible and evil feminine omnipotence. Becoming an adherent of the secret cult of the vagina, Tanya realizes that radical feminism is revenge on men for centuries of humiliation.

And in appearance, this revenge is not much different from the usual female psychological manipulation and exploitation of men aimed at obtaining material benefits from them, except that it is carried out by magical means and on a larger scale.

Victor Pelevin has always been prone to mild and socially acceptable forms of anti-feminism, but in this novel he takes it to new heights. The emancipation of women, the symmetrical weakening of men and the blurring of traditional gender roles in his eyes becomes a frankly sinister event, jeopardizing the slightest possibility of saving the roles of men and women created by nature.
