= The Reconstructor =

1990 short story by Victor Pelevin

- Short story by Victor Pelevin
- Language: Russian

Publication
- Publication date: 1990
- Publication place: Russia
- Media type: Print (Paperback)

"The Reconstructor" (Russian: «Реконструктор») is a short story by Victor Pelevin, published in 1990.

== Plot ==
The story "The Reconstructor" is written in the genre of a review of the fictional book "The Memory of the Fiery Years" by P. Stetsyuk, which, based on declassified military archives, tells about the real personality of Stalin.

Narrator-editor with a large share of irony and skepticism reviews uninteresting and boring, from his point of view, a book devoted to the discovery of historical "truth" about the true identity of the mystified Stalin, according to the narrator, -Ruler of Russia Joseph Stalin (but in patronymic Andreevich, born in 1894).

The reviewer advises the reader not to read the unnecessary research and at the same time assures him that the book is still worth reading. The narrative is framed in a pseudoscientific style, on behalf of a group of researchers whose arguments the author lays out.

Pelevin actively uses in the text the arsenal of "nabokov's" techniques. For example, the narrator quotes passages from a fictional book by the fictional author P. Stetsyuk, polemicizes with his conclusions, sneers at the style, the shambolic and metaphorical manner of statements (and the stereotype of the reader's perception).

P. Stetsyuk's "Memory of the Fiery Years" tells of a mysterious steel tube made by a Minsk radio factory, because of which a series of grotesque deaths follows. Next is the discovery that instead of one Stalin was as many as seven of his doubles, who lived in an isolated underground and there led the Soviet Union.

Despite the implausibility of the "truth" presented in "The Reconstructor", the abundance of specific details, dates, names, addresses, references to archives and document ciphers creates the illusion of reliability of the "facts" presented.

Thus, blatant fiction begins to claim the status of a "real" historical event, and previously functioning documented evidence loses its certifying power and is refuted by new pseudo-facts.

Pelevin works with modern myths and the reader's consciousness, eager to join the fantastic mystery. The author creates an alternative history, breaks the logic of cause-and-effect relations of known to all events out of text reality in a mockery of the hypothetical possibility of such a project, at the same time demonstrating the unlimited power of artistic discourse over reality.

The narrative itself becomes an illustration of the professional application of methods and techniques of falsification of any fact, designed to destroy the boundary between reality and fiction. The main discovery made by the author of "Memory of the Fiery Years" after the study of declassified documentation of the Minsk radio factory, which produced a mysterious steel tube, which provoked the appearance of a series of absurdly grotesque deaths, P. Stetsyuk investigated is the proof of the existence of seven of his doubles, living in an underground isolated from the world.

The narrator, following the author of the book, names their names and periods of government, describes certain facts of their scanty biographies, traces the influence of underground drunken debauches on events in the country.

Thus, among those who lived in the Stalin bunker was Nikita Khrushchev: the external ground double outsmarted the "real" Khrushchev by flooding the underground with concrete together with all its inhabitants, and continued ruling under an alias. The country was also ruled by a certain Serob Nalbandian (from 1932 to 1935). For some time, the role of leader was played by three "drinking companions" who happened to get to power.

The abundance of versions and assumptions produced by the narrator of "The Reconstructor" about P. Stetsyuk's book only further confuses the reader, distancing him from the truth, problematizing the status of the reviewed text. In the final part of the story, the narrator, who alluded to the fictitiousness of "Memories of the Fiery Years," gives a metaphysical interpretation of everything described that multiplies the uncertainty.
