= Ivan Zassoursky =

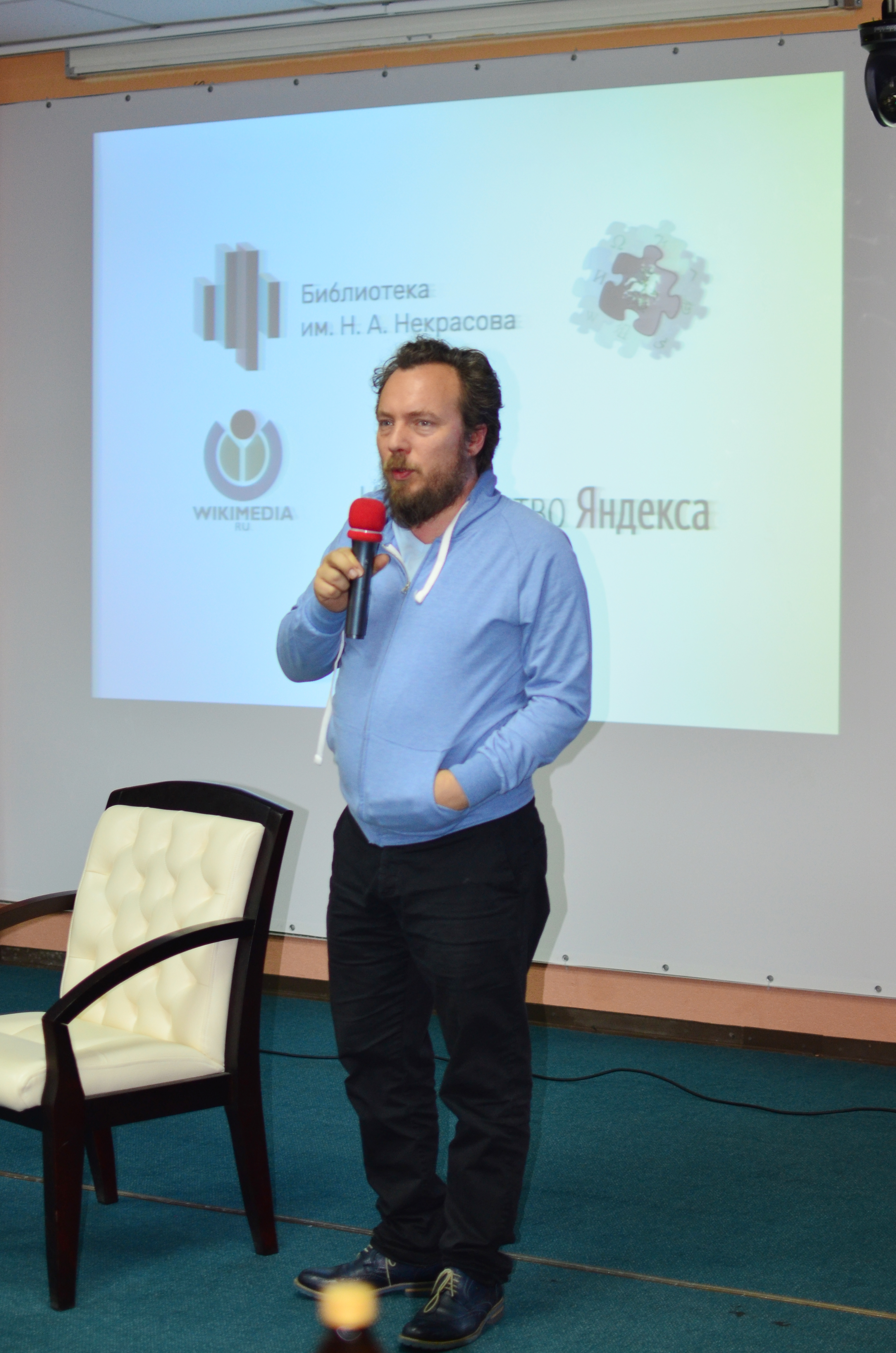
- Born: August 29, 1974 (age 52)
- Occupations: Professor, Journalist
- Employer: Moscow State University

Ivan Ivanovich Zassoursky (Russian: Иван Засурский; born 29 August 1974) is a Russian journalist, philologist, professor, producer, and researcher. He is the head of the Department of New Media and Communications Theory Studies in the School of Journalism at the Moscow State University, founder and publisher of Chastny Korrespondent, an online newspaper. He was also the host of Press Club XXI, a talk show, and has authored more than 500 publications and periodicals in Russia and abroad. He is the grandson of Yassen Zassoursky.

== Career ==
Ivan Zassoursky started his career at the age of 17, in the early 1990s, as a reporter for the Russian daily Nezavisimaya Gazeta. In 1993 he became the head of the Economics desk at Nezavisimaya Gazeta. During this time, he completed his studies at the Moscow State University School of Journalism with highest honors. The following year, Zassoursky worked as the development coordinator at Obshaya Gazeta. In 1997, he briefly left professional journalism to serve as an advisor to Boris Nemtsov, the first Deputy Chairman of the Government of the Russian Federation. He already had political experience from the 1995 gubernatorial campaign in the Nizhny Novgorod Oblast.

In 1999, he published the book "Mass Media in the Second Republic" (Russian: Масс-медиа второй республики), an essay on the topics of mass media in 1990s Russia. The book touches on the transformation of mass media from a so-called fourth estate into a kind of agent of new centers of political power. "Mass Media in the Second Republic"" received the Moscow State University’s Shuvalov Award.

In 1998, while part of the faculty of journalism at the Moscow State University, Zassoursky submitted and successfully defended his dissertation for a PhD in Philology titled “Mass Media in Russia Under Conditions of Global Transformation: The Formation of a New System of Information and its Role in Russia’s Political System from 1990-1998”. During this period, Ivan Zassoursky was also the youngest research fellow in the MSU School of Journalism.

By the early 2000s, Zassoursky returned to devoting his full-time to professional journalism. He was particularly interested in the field of digital journalism, which was growing in popularity at the time, and blogging as new forms of the journalistic trade. He also became the co-director of the Russian-American Center at the State University of New York and conducted a lecture tour along the east coast of the United States. He then became the director of the Laboratory of Media Culture and Communications at the MSU School of Journalism, after which, a few years later, he was appointed head of the Department of New Media and Communications Theory Studies.

From 2001 to 2005, Zassoursky worked as deputy general-director of public relations and marketing at Rambler, owner of one of Russia's biggest web portals at the time, and, subsequently, he prepared the company's research papers as director of special projects. During the initial public offering of Rambler-Media, Zassoursky oversaw the distribution agreement between Rambler and ICQ.

In the fall of 2006, Zassoursky was invited to join SUP Media as the director of marketing. As a result of diverging interests, Zassoursky left the company the following year.

In December 2009, he was one of the first signers of an open letter calling for the reform of the Russian system of author's right.

In 2019 he started working on climate change problems. In September 2019 he published an article on Presidential Council for Civil Society and Human Rights with an elaborated proposal on the new Russian national idea that would be based on the ecological principles and love of Nature, basing it on the motto “Mother Nature is our Motherland!”, echoing traditional patriotic narrative in a green way.

In December 2019 at the meeting with President Vladimir Putin, Zassoursky spelled out the risk and dangers linked to climate change and voiced the necessity of technological transformation of the Russian economy based on the new national policies on climate.

In February 2020 he presented climatescience.ru, a platform that aggregates over 77000 open access scientific articles on climate that are indexed by Web of science. The portal also serves as a discussion platform for the scientific community on climate change.

On this platform, the report of the Standing Committee on Environmental Rights of the Presidential Council for Civil Society and Human Rights of the Russian Federation was published, named “The Green Turn”. The full title of the report was “Climate change as a political and economic challenge: a unique opportunity for the Russian Federation to technologically transform and respect the environmental rights of its citizens”. The report detailed climate change impacts and risks a detailed manner by sectors of the economy and regions as elaborated by experts that prepared the report. The report suggests looking at the climate challenge as unique opportunity to enable technological transform of the country. The suggestions were well received and helped changing the position of Russia in relation to the emerging global climate change agenda.

== Films ==
In 2011 Ivan Zassoursky co-produced an award-winning independent Russian film Generation P. The film was directed by Victor Ginzburg and is based on the Victor Pelevin’s novel of the same name. Zassoursky was in charge of internet promotion campaign of the fim, bringing in media support from Rambler, Yandex, Facebook and LiveJournal for its release.

In 2016 it became known that Zassoursky is a producer on a new film based on Pelevin's novel Empire V. In June 2018 an ICO campaign has been announced with the goal to help fund the shooting and post-production. The currency was named Bablos and brought more than a million dollars to the film's budget. The ICO was successfully finished in November 2018, making Empire V the first major blockbuster ever to be financed by its own cryptocurrency. The film's release is planned for late 2019 – beginning of 2020.

== Chastny Korrespondent ==
In October 2008, Zassoursky founded Chastny Korrespondent, a Russian web publication, the first to operate under a creative commons license in Russia. One of the main goals of this was the desire to help Russian Wikipedia, and to give talented writers the opportunity to showcase their abilities as citizen journalists. In November 2011, Chastny Korrespondent was the winner of the Runet Prize in the category of “Culture and Mass Communications”.

== Nauchny Korrespondent ==
In October 2015 Ivan Zassoursky launched a new project Nauchny Korrespondent (also "NauchKor", translated as "Science correspondent"). It is an internet-based open publication platform for scientific papers, theses and other works. The platform provides tools for verifying authorship, building a personal academic portfolio, providing exposure, allowing easy participation in paper contests and encouraging students’ and scientists’ involvement in scientific circulation. Works are published under Creative Commons license by default. Nauchny Korrespondent also helps students and their potential employers connect and form pre-recruitment relationships, as well as coordinating research endeavours with industry demands.

The project aims to enhance and reform the established academic practice and become a centralised transparent framework for research process, citation, peer review and other academic activities.

== Russian Federal Reserve System of knowledge repositories ==
In 2017 Zassoursky launched the Federal Reserve System of knowledge repositories – an open and transparent digital system that provides a convenient way for registering works, identifying copyright status and protecting attribution and integrity of publications and data.

Uploaded content is automatically indexed and replicated, with its backup copies being stored in several external repositories. All of the preserved documents and their metadata are persisted in the Noosphere register at Noosphere.ru that contains information on over a million entries that consist of public domain, open licensed and some orphan works. The nation-based system strives to archive multimedia works and build up international cooperation to avoid copyright privatisation and disappearances of public domain and open licensed content.

Among the founders of Russian FRS were Wikimedia.ru (a nonprofit organization running Russian-language Wikipedia), Maxim Moshkov, founder of the largest electronic open access library lib.ru, leading information providers such as NEICON, and others.
