= London Russian Film Festival =

The London Russian Film Festival is an annual film festival, launched by Academia Rossica in 2007. The festival is aimed to present cinema in Russian language to an English speaking audience. All films are shown in original language, with English subtitles. The film programme includes feature films as well documentaries and animated films. Apart from the film screenings, the festival encompasses Q&A sessions with actors, directors and producers presenting the films, discussion events about contemporary Russian films and culture, and film showings specially for children.

== History ==
=== 1st London Russian Film Festival (2007) ===
The 1st London Russian Film Festival was opened on 27 September with the objective to make Russian cinema accessible to an English speaking audience. In the British press this was interpreted as a sign of growing "cultural links between to two countries". The festival programme included recent Russian films, that had already received several awards in Russia and abroad, such as Euphoria by Ivan Vyryapev, winner of the debut prize at the Venice Film Festival in 2007, or Travelling with Pets by Vera Storozheva, awarded with the top prize at the Moscow Film Festival. Many of the films were introduced by the directors and/or cast members.

=== 2nd London Russian Film Festival (2008) ===
At the 2nd Russian Film Festival 10 theatrical premiers of award-winning Russian films produced in 2007-2008 were presented, among them Nirvana by Ivan Voloshin and Nikita Mikhalkov's film 12, that had previously been shown with great success at the Venice Film Festival and was nominated for the Academy Awards. In 2008 the festival was aimed to gain a strengthened position as a platform for inter-cultural dialogue between Russian and UK audiences and filmmakers. Leading directors and actors were encouraged to introduce their films personally, and to participate in Q&A sessions.

=== 3rd London Russian Film Festival (2009) ===
The 3rd London Russian Film Festival opened on 30 October with the showing of Sergei Soliviev's adaptation of Anna Karenina. The director and the main actress Tatiana Drubich were present at the opening night and discussed the film with the audience in a Q&A session after the screening. Generally speaking, films based on works of literature - The Event by Andrey Eshpay, Way to Heaven by Nikolay Dostal, and Ward No 6 by Karen Shakhnazarov - were among the most popular entries, probably also supported by the fact, that Ward No 6 had appeared on the longlist for the Academy Awards in the same year. Other films were also well received at the London Russian Film Festival, in particular Pavel Bardin's mockumentary Russia 88, and Paper Soldier by Alexei German Jr., a drama set on the background of the first crewed Soviet aerospace project.

=== 4th London Russian Film Festival (2010) ===
The main programme of the 4th London Russian Film Festival included the controversial One War by Vera Glagoleva, a moving relook at crime and punishment during the Second World War, and Svetlana Proscurina's latest thought provoking film The Truce, an unsettling portrayal of provincial Russia laced with humour and lyricism which won Russia's Kinotavr’s main prize. Also amongst the main programme's feature films were the applauded Gastarbeiter by Yusup Razykov and Reverse Motion by Andrey Stempkovsky. The documentary programme looked back at last decade in Russia, offering a window into the real Russia, with screenings of the ten finest Russian documentary films, one for each year. Garri Bardin’s The Ugly Duckling, a children's stop-motion animated film with Orwellian overtones deemed so politically subversive it was banned from showing on Russian television, was the opening night film. The festival also included a retrospective of the great actor and director Sergei Bondarchuk's films and the works of Leo Tolstoy on film, as well as a retrospective of masters of Soviet and Russian animation.

=== 5th London Russian Film Festival (2011) ===
The 5th Russian Film Festival opened on 4 November with the UK premiere of Generation P by Victor Ginzburg, a portrait of the complex and often absurd story of how today's Russia came into being. The main programme included Innocent Saturday by Aleksander Mindadze, a reconstruction of the 36 hours before the explosion of Chernobyl, Twilight Portrait by Angelina Nikonova, the story of Marina, a social worker dealing with cases of domestic abuse within a society rife with police corruption and sexual violence, and Elena by Andrei Zvyagintsev, the story of Elena, a timid housewife and former nurse, and her relationship with her aging husband and businessman, Vladimir. Among the other feature films, Vladimir Kott's Gromozeka received the audience's award for best film, followed by Vitaly Mansky's Patria o Muerte, a feature-length documentary filmed in Cuba. Curated by Vitaly Mansky, the documentary programme presented the works of five outstanding young women directors and their films on women's lives in today's Russia. Amongst them, Yulia Panasenko's Outro received the Grand Prix at the Flaertiana International Documentary Film Festival. The Festival programme also included the Short Film and the Animation Film sections, the former introducing two ground-breaking new projects: the collective project Experiment 5ive and Alexei German Jr.’s new short From Tokyo, and the latter presenting a comprehensive and diverse range of animation, among which The Women’s Day Gift by Mikhail Dvoryankin.

=== 6th London Russian Film Festival (2012) ===
The 6th Russian Film Festival opened in London on 2 November with Boris Khlebnikov's Till Night Do Us Part (2012) - a comedy based on real conversations overheard by the journalist Natalia Utkin in one of Moscow's most expensive restaurants. The main programme included several films receiving their UK premiere, among them the awarding-winning films, Aleksei Balabanov's 2012 darkly humorous Me Too, which won the Best Director Prize at St. Petersburg Film Festival 2012 and Alexander Proshkin's 2012 poetic eulogy to post-Soviet Russia, "Redemption", which received Best Artistic Contribution Prize at the 2012 Montreal World Film Festival. The Festival Documentary Programme, curated by Vitaly Mansky - president of Artdocfest - included Valery Shevchenko's 2011 "Inside a Square Circle", which examines notions of parental love, state authority and chaos. The programme also included the usual Animation category, screening such films as "Berry Pie" and "Green Teeth". For the second year in a row, the Russian Film Festival also hosted the 2nd Russo-British Co-Production Forum Alongside this, the Russian Film Festival also celebrated the work of the acclaimed director Andrei Konchalovsky, screening a selection of the films which span his prolific six-decade career, including "House of Fools" (2002), awarded the Grand jury prize and the UNICEF Award at the Venice Film Festival 2012, and "Runaway Train", winner of the Golden Globe for Best Actor in 1986.

== Films ==
=== 2007 ===
Feature films

- Euphoria - Ivan Vyryapev
- Goddess - Renata Litvinova
- The Island - Pavel Lungin
- On Upper Maslovka Street - Konstantin Khudyakov
- Piter FM - Oxana Bychkova
- Playing the Victim - Kirill Serebrennikov
- Travelling with Pets - Vera Storozheva

=== 2008 ===
Feature films

- Best of Times - Svetlana Proskurina
- Cruelty - Marina Liubakova
- Live to Remember - Alexander Proshkin
- Nirvana - Igor Voloshin
- Terra Nova - Alexander Mel’nik
- 12 - Nikita Mikhalkov
- Simple Things - Alexei Popogrebsky
- 20 Cigarettes - Alexander Gornovsky
- Wild Field - Mikhail Kalatozishvili
- Yuri's Day - Kirill Serebrennikov

Documentaries

- The Drunken Sailor - Sergei Bodrov
- A Melody for German - Ivan Bolotnikov
- Rock Monologue - Vladimir Kozlov
- Virginity - Vitaly Mansky

Animation

- Flash Smash: Russian Digital Animation - Vlad Strukov

=== 2009 ===
Feature films

- Anna Karenina - Sergei Soliviev
- Assa 2 - Sergei Solovyov
- Melody for a Street Organ - Kira Muratova
- Papier Soldier - Alexei German Jr.
- Russia 88 - Pavel Bardin
- Tale about Darkness - Nikolay Khomeriki
- Ward No 6 - Karen Shakhnazarov
- Way to Heaven - Nikolay Dostal

Documentaries

- Body Parts - Maria Kravchenko
- City of the Sun - Alexander Murugov
- In Motion - Alexander Vorontsov/Julia Kiseleva
- Sunrise/Sunset - Vitaly Mansky
- The Back of Beyond - Evgeniy Solomin
- The Long Road Home - Aleksandr Gorelik

Short films

- Artsutanov's Lift: In Pursuit of a Genius with a Video Camera - Daria Emeljanova
- The Ghost of Europe - Igor Morozov
- A Gust of Wind - Ekaterina Telegina
- Mono Lisa - Yana Konofalskaya
- Once upon a Time - Alexey Savenko
- The Road to Lamz - Andrey Averkov

Animation

- Cat's Walk - Dmitri Nahumov/Irina Margolina/Mikhail Lisovoi
- First Squad - Yoshiharo Ashino
- A Fish - Sergei Ryabov
- Kashtanka - Natalia Orlova/Vladimir Golovanov/Vera Piunova
- Pudya - Sofia Kravtsova/Andrei Stovlinsky/Yekaterina Tregub
- The Quiet Story - Alexei Demin
- Seashore. Nurse - Sergei Seregin/Vladimir Golovanov/Sofia Kravtsova
- Sherlock Holmes and Doctor Watson - Aleksandr Bubnov/Irina Kovtun/Zoya Trofimova
- The True Story of The Three Little Pigs - Konstantin Bronzit/Irina Margolina
- Wind along the Coast - Ivan Maksimov

=== 2010 ===
Feature films

- The Ugly Duckling - Garry Bardin
- Truce - Svetlana Proskurina
- Reverse Motion - Andrey Stempkovsky
- One War - Vera Glagoleva
- How I Ended This Summer - Alexei Popogrebski
- The Man At The Window - Dmitry Meskhiev
- Sparrow - Yuri Shiller
- Star Dogs Belka & Strelka - Inna Evlannikova
- Gasterbeiter - Yusup Razykov
- The Golden Mean - Sergei Debizhev

Documentaries

- The Train Stop - Sergei Loznitsa
- My Gosh! - Susanna Barandzhieva
- Just Life - Marina Razbezhkina
- Broadway, The Black Sea - Vitaly Mansky
- Wedding of Silence - Pavel Medvedev
- A Civic Condition - Alina Rudnitskaya
- Six Including the Children - Alexander Malinin
- Mother - Anton Katin and Pavel Kostomarev
- Until the Next Resurrection - Oleg Morozov
- The Revolution That Wasn't - Alyona Polunina
- Sanya Sparrow - Andrei Gryazev

Animation

- Garry Bardin Retrospective
- Little Tragedies - Irina Evteeva
- Petersburg - Svetlana Svirko
- Irina Evteeva Retrospective
- The First Meeting - Oleg Uzhinov
- Tunnelage - Ivan Maximov
- A Trip to the Seaside - Nina Bisyarina
- Tracks of Unseen - Oleg Uzhinov
- Look Up - Svetlana Podyacheva
- Log Jam - Alexei Alexeev
- About a Catfish - Julia Ruditskaya
- Poor Sharik - Anastasia Sokolova

=== 2011 ===
Feature films

- Generation P - Victor Ginzburg
- Innocent Saturday - Aleksander Mindadze
- Gromozeka - Vladimir Kott
- Twilight Portrait - Angelina Nikonova
- Indifference - Oleg Flyangolts
- Patria o Muerte - Vitaly Mansky
- Hunter - Bakur Bakuradze
- Target (Mishen) - Alexander Zeldovich
- Elena - Andrei Zvyagintsev

Documentaries

- Outro - Yulia Panasenko
- Tram Street - Sophia Geveiler
- Women on Top - Alyona Polunina
- I Will Forget This Day - Alina Rudnitskaya
- Lyosha Elena Demidova

Short Films

- Bloodrop 3D - Alexei Popogrebski
- Portrait - Alexander Veledinsky
- Sunrise/Sunset Pyotr Buslov
- Mystery - Andrei Zvyagintsev
- Atlantika - Igor Voloshin
- From Tokyo - Alexei German Jr

Animation

- The Women's Day Gift - Mikhail Dvoryankin
- One More Time - Alina yalkhyeva, Elena Petrova
- My Dog Loves Jazz - Veronika Fedorova
- The Little Girl Who Cut Her Finger - Eduard Belyaev
- Living with Wolves, Masha and the Bear series - Oleg Kuzovkov
- Teeth, Tail and Ears - Sergey Merinov
- The Sparrow Who Kept His Word - Dmitry Geller
- Shatalo - Alexei Demin
- Bach - Anton Diakov
- Not A Sad Story - Maria Muat

=== 2012 ===
Feature Films

- Till Night Do Us Part - Boris Khlebnikov
- Short Stories - Mikhail Segal
- I Will Be Around - Pavel Ruminov
- Anton is Right Here - Lyubov Arkus
- Winter, Go Away! - Marina Razbezhkina
- Redemption - Alexander Proshkin
- Living - Vasily Sigarev
- Convoy - Alexei Mizgirev
- Iconoscope - Vitaly Mansky
- Conductor - Pavel Lungin
- Kokoko - Avdotya Smirnova
- Me Too - Aleksei Balabanov
- Rita's Last Tale - Renata Litvinova
- Chapiteau-Show - Sergey Loban

Documentaries

- Milana - Madina Mustafina
- The Ceiling - Natalia Uglitskikh
- Inside A Square Circle - Valery Shevchenko
- How I Have Eaten My Student Allowance - Pavel Afanasiev

Animation

- Masha and the Bear No. 18, 19, 21
- Berry Pie
- A Christmas Tree Fairy Tale
- My Mum is an Airplane
- The Sparrow Who Kept His Word
- The Snowflake
- Green Teeth
- Lucky! Kit is in Love!/Lucky! Black Holes!
- Sweetheart
- Where Dogs Die
- Out of Play
- My Strange Grandad
- Umba-Umba
- The Snowy Rider
- Chinti
- Pishto Goes Away

Andrey Konchalovsky Retrospective

- House of Fools
- Runaway Train
- The Nutcracker
