= MSU Faculty of Journalism =

Faculty of Moscow State University

Coordinates: 55°45′15″N 37°36′38″E

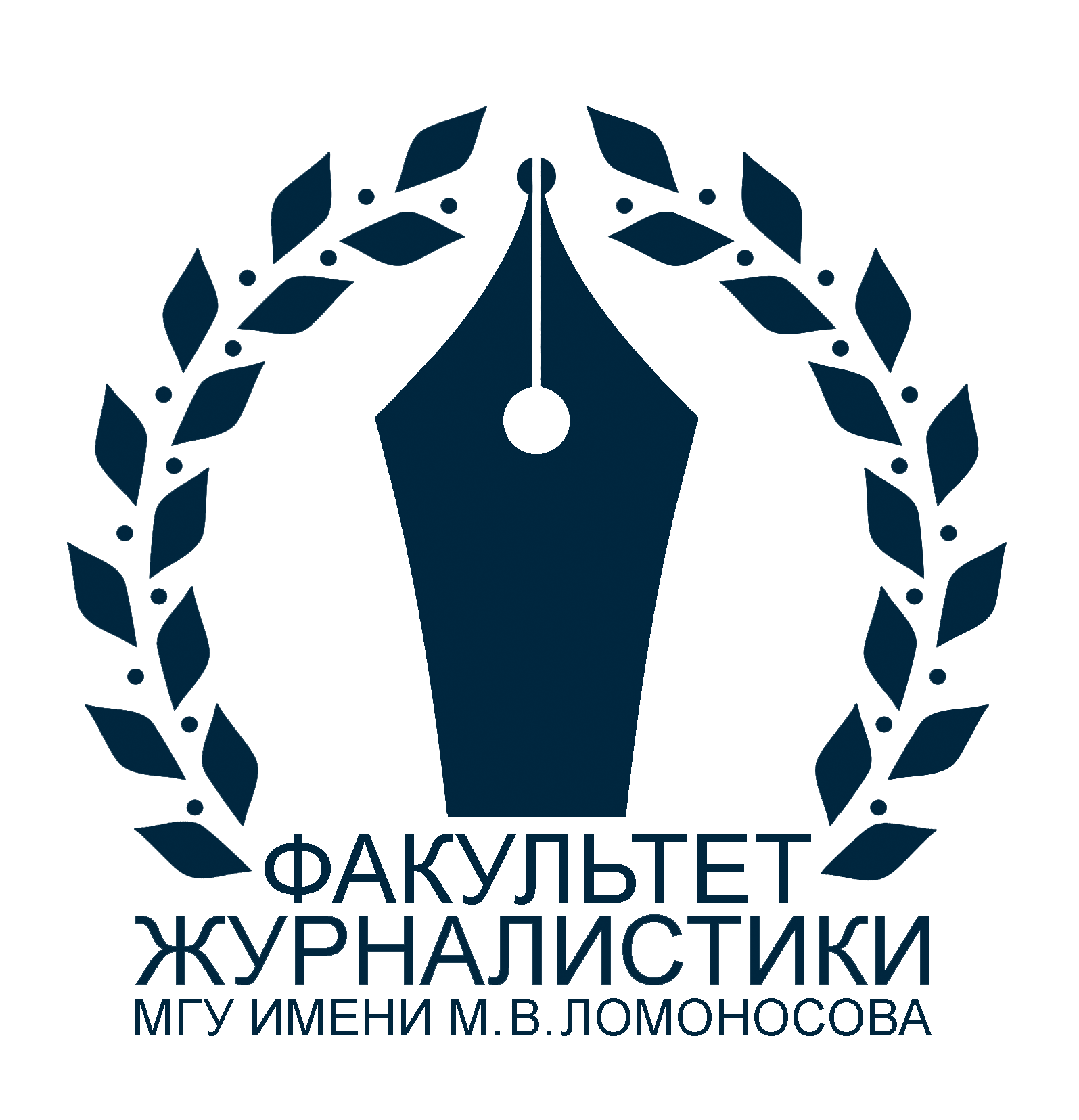

The MSU Faculty of Journalism is a faculty of the Moscow State University. It is situated on the Mohovaya, 9, in downtown Moscow, approximately one block away from the Kremlin.

The dean of the MSU Faculty of Journalism is professor Elena Leonidovna Vartanova. The president is professor Yassen Nikolayevich Zassoursky. Zassoursky was the dean of the Faculty of Journalism since 1965 till 2007.

The Department of Journalism was established in 1947 (79 years ago) at the Faculty of Philology of the Moscow State University. In 1952 it was reorganised as the independent Faculty of Journalism. About 15,000 mass media specialists who work in different editorial boards, television and radio stations, and news agencies in Russia and abroad have been educated at the Faculty. More than 600 foreign students from Europe, Asia, Africa, and America have graduated from the Faculty of Journalism.

== Academic departments ==
- Periodical Press (Head: Professor Michail Shkondin)
- Radio and Television (Head: Associate Professor Anna Kachkaeva)
- Media Theory and Economics (Head: Professor Elena Vartanova)
- Mass Media Techniques (Head: Associate Professor Stanislav Galkin)
- Sociology of Journalism (Head: Professor Evgeniy Prokhorov)
- Advertising and Public Relations (Head: Professor Vladimir Gorokhov)
- Editing, Publishing and Informatics (Head: Associate Professor Marina Alekseeva)
- History of Russian Journalism and Literature (Head: Professor Boris Esin)
- History of Modern Russian Mass Media and Media Law (Head: Professor Andrei Richter)
- History of Foreign Journalism and Literature (Head: Professor Yassen Zassoursky)
- Literary Criticism and Opinion journalism (Head: Professor Nickolay Bogomolov)
- Russian Language Stylistics (Head: Professor Grigoriy Solganik)
- New Media and Theory of Communication (Head: Associate Professor Ivan Zassoursky)
- UNESCO Chair of Journalism and Mass Communication (Head: Professor Yassen Zassoursky)

== Departments, Centres and Labs ==
- Radio and TV Centre
- Convergence Lab
- Department for Media Practice
- International Department
- French College of Journalism
- Free Russian-German Institute of Publicists
- Centre for Studies of Media Systems in Finland and Scandinavia
- Russian-Italian Centre For Studies of Media, Culture and Communication
- Russian-Japanese Centre for Studies of Media and Culture
- Centre For Studies of Ibero-American Journalism and Culture
- Russian-Indian Centre For Studies of Media and Culture

== Notable alumni ==
- Yevgenia Albats (born 1958), investigative journalist, political scientist, writer, and radio host.
- Valery Borshchyov (1943–2025), politician, human rights activist, and journalist
- Dmitry Bykov (born 1967), writer, poet, literary critic, and journalist.
- Vladislav Flyarkovsky (born 1958), journalist, broadcaster, and television commentator
- Alexander Khinshtein (born 1974), former journalist and governor of Kursk Oblast
- Artemy Lebedev (born 1975), designer, entrepreneur, and Internet personality
- Michael Novakhov (born1976), American radio station founder and host, and member of the New York State Assembly
- Vitaly Portnikov (born 1967), Ukrainian editor and journalist

== See also ==
- Journalism school
