= Yassen Zassoursky =

Soviet and Russian literary critic (1929–2021)

- Ясен Засурский
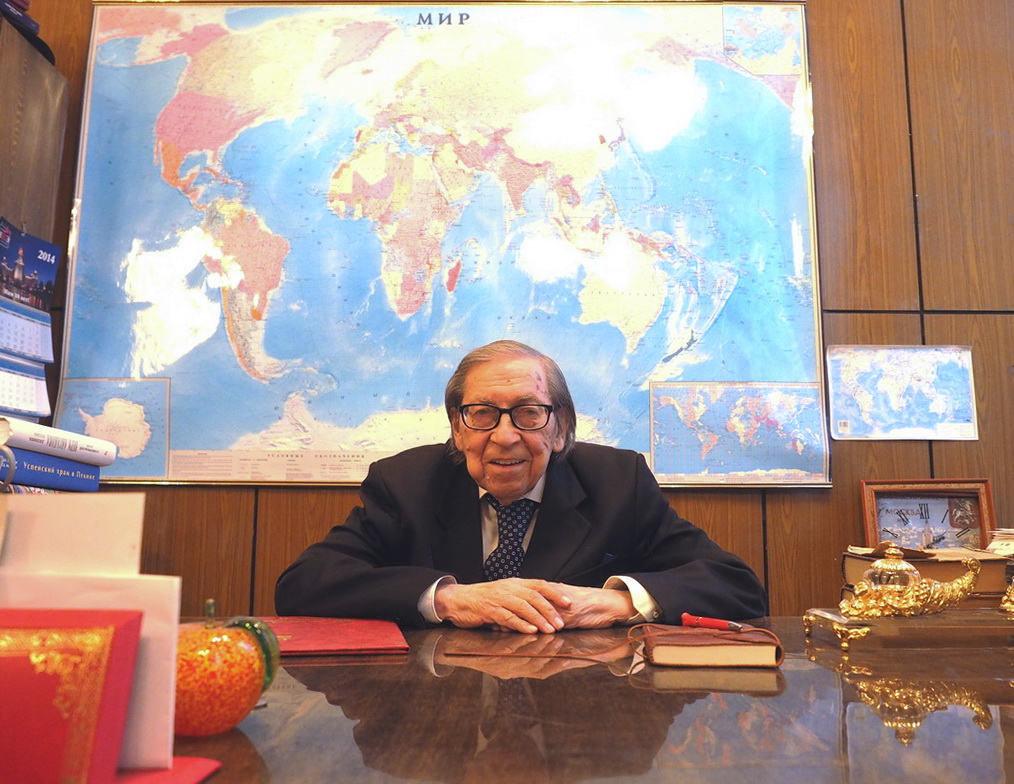
- Born: Yasen Zasursky; October 29, 1929; Moscow, Russian SFSR, Soviet Union
- Died: August 1, 2021 (aged 91); Moscow, Russia
- Resting place: Troyekurovskoye Cemetery, Moscow
- Education: Moscow State Pedagogical Institute of Foreign Languages (1948)
- Occupations: Literary scholar; Media theorist; Journalist; Educator
- Years active: 1951–2021
- Employer: Moscow State University
- Title: Dean of Faculty of Journalism, MSU (1965–2007); President of Faculty of Journalism, MSU (2007–2021)
- Spouse: Svetlana Sherlaimova (1927–2019)
- Children: 1 son
- Awards: See list: Order "For Merit to the Fatherland", 4th class (1999); Order of Friendship (2005); Order of the Red Banner of Labour (1980); Order of the Badge of Honor (1961, 1976); Order of Academic Palms (2002, France); Honored Journalist of the Russian Federation (2018)
- Scientific career
- Academic advisors: Maurice Mendelson, Roman Samarin, Nikolai Chemodanov

Signature
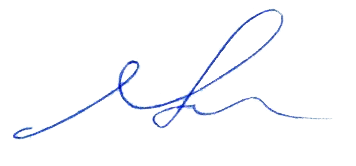

Yassen Nikolayevich Zassoursky (also Yasen Nikolayevich Zasursky; Russian: Я́сен Никола́евич Засу́рский; October 29, 1929 – August 1, 2021) was a Soviet and Russian literary scholar, media theorist, journalist, and educator. He held the degree of Doctor of Philological Sciences (1967) and the academic title of professor (1968). From 1965 to 2007, he served as dean of the Faculty of Journalism at Lomonosov Moscow State University, and from 2007 to 2021 as president of the Faculty of Journalism.

Zassoursky was one of the most influential figures in Russian journalism education and media studies. For several decades, he was deeply involved in international academic cooperation and maintained close professional ties with UNESCO, participating in expert commissions on communication, media systems, and global information flows, representing Russia in international research associations, IAMCR and many others. Through this work, he became part of a broad international intellectual network and played an important role in integrating Soviet and later Russian journalism studies into global scholarly discourse.

In 2018, he was awarded the honorary title Honored Journalist of the Russian Federation.

== Biography ==
=== Early years ===
Yassen Zassoursky was born on October 29, 1929, in Moscow. According to his own recollections, his parents initially wanted to give him the revolutionary name Revol, but his mother later named him Yasen, in honor of the clear blue eyes of his father.

His family background had a significant influence on his life and worldview. His father's dramatic personal history — service in Soviet security structures, opposition to lawlessness, and the forced change of surname — formed in Zassoursky a lifelong skepticism toward unchecked power and a strong sense of moral responsibility. His mother's work in foreign-language publishing introduced him early to world literature and international culture. These family influences later manifested in his commitment to ethical journalism, intellectual independence, and dialogue between cultures.

Zassoursky remembered events following the signing of the non-aggression pact between the USSR and Germany, when his maternal grandfather, Fyodor Makarovich Makarov, predicted an inevitable clash with the Germans. His grandfather died on December 5, 1941. During the funeral service at Vagankovo Cemetery, the coffin reportedly jumped from nearby explosions, as Moscow was being heavily bombed.

The family was evacuated during the war. When they returned to Moscow in May 1943, Zassoursky resumed his studies in the seventh grade. In 1944, he passed entrance examinations to the English Department of the Moscow State Pedagogical Institute of Foreign Languages named after Maurice Thorez.

Although the administration allowed the prodigious student to attend lectures, it required a secondary-school diploma. Zassoursky therefore completed school externally and in 1945 was admitted directly to the second year of the institute. He graduated in 1948.

He specialized in American literature with the assistance of Professor M. O. Mendelson. During his postgraduate studies, his academic supervisor was Professor Roman Mikhailovich Samarin. He studied journalism under N. S. Chemodanov, Dean of the Philological Faculty of Moscow State University, and the prominent linguist K. I. Bylinsky.

=== Academic work ===
In 1951, Zassoursky defended his Candidate of Sciences dissertation entitled "The Path of Theodore Dreiser to Communism." From 1951 to 1953, he worked as a scientific editor at the Foreign Literature Publishing House.

In 1953, he joined the Faculty of Journalism of Moscow State University, which had been established shortly before. From 1955 onward, he served as head of the Department of Foreign Journalism and Literature, a position he held for more than 64 years.

Beginning in 1958, Zassoursky undertook professional training in France under a UNESCO program. He lectured and advanced his qualifications at the International Center for Journalism Teacher Training in Strasbourg, headed by Jacques Leauté. There he met American scholars, including Professor Nixon, head of the International Association of Media Teachers and Researchers, and media researcher George Gerbner, who conducted comparative studies of media systems and formulated the thesis that the press cannot be independent but can be autonomous.

Another American scholar, the anti-fascist Herbert Schiller, made a strong impression on Zassoursky as a critic of the commodification of public consciousness.

While in France, Zassoursky witnessed Charles de Gaulle's rise to power and waves of political terror, when members of the OAS used plastic bombs. During this same period, he observed television broadcasting for the first time, at a moment when television in the USSR was only beginning to develop.

From 1965 to 2007, Zassoursky served as Dean of the Faculty of Journalism, and from 2007 as its president. He was also the first dean in the history of Moscow State University who had been elected by the faculty. "I became dean at the age of 35. The Central Committee of the CPSU wanted to appoint their own person to this position, but the faculty strongly opposed it. They chose me. It was 1965. I did not want to be dean, but I worked in this position for 42 years."

In 1967, he earned the degree of Doctor of Philological Sciences. His doctoral dissertation was entitled American Literature of the 20th Century. He became a professor in 1968.

From 1995 to 1999, Zassoursky served as chairman of the Commission for Licensing Radio and Television Frequencies. He authored more than 200 academic works, including 16 monographs, his countless interviews to TV and radio stations made him one of the most celebrated academics of his time. He was a member of the editorial board of the journal Index / Dossier on Censorship.

Until 1989, he swam regularly and was actively involved in cycling. Until the age of 80, he went for daily runs to maintain his physical fitness. From 2002 to 2007, he chaired the jury of the annual Vladimir Mezentsev Competition "Young Journalists of Russia", and later became chairman of the competition's board of trustees.

=== Activities at the Faculty of Journalism ===
Zassoursky served as dean of the Faculty of Journalism for 42 years. During this period, the faculty became one of the leading centers for training media professionals in Russia and graduated more than 30,000 specialists.

As head of the Department of Foreign Journalism and Literature, Zassoursky made major efforts to internationalize education. At his invitation, American scholars George Gerbner and Herbert Schiller, as well as Finnish media researcher Kaarle Nordenstreng, came to Moscow in 1968 to participate in a conference on new technologies.

That same year, Zassoursky personally witnessed the student revolution in France, when students occupied the Sorbonne, accused professors of serving the authorities, rebelled against consumer society, and declared that they did not want to live for televisions and washing machines.

In 1969, he observed a similar uprising in the United States, which paralyzed Columbia University with the exception of its School of Journalism. This phenomenon was explained to him by the fact that journalism students understood that rebels would not be needed in the newspapers where they were expected to work and that they did not plan to engage in underground press activities.

In 1990, Zassoursky initiated a joint Russian-American book project on Russian and American literature. The book was never published; however, during its preparation, annual exchange visits between Russian and American writers and scholars were organized, which, in his view, opened new intellectual perspectives. He oversaw and edited a comprehensive history of American literature in 8 volumes and helped to launch countless careers and media projects in the USSR and Russia, countries of the Soviet bloc and the Commonwealth of Independent States that succeeded the USSR. Following changes in the social system, new courses were introduced at the faculty, including advertising, public relations, and economics. German, French, and Finnish journalism centers were established, staffed by representatives of those countries. Spanish, Japanese, Indian, and other centers enabled students to study diverse cultures. "This is a long-standing feature of Russian culture — not to oppose oneself to others, but to absorb the best from both East and West. As a result, Russian literature and culture became only richer. That is why we still study Homer, Flaubert, Joyce, and contemporary authors."

Zassoursky considered the intellectual and ethical education of students one of his principal achievements. Literature was taught by Andrei Sinyavsky, Galina Belaya, and Anatoly Bocharov; sociology by Boris Grushin and Yuri Levada. Ditmar Rosental, author of widely used schoolbooks of Russian language, worked as head of the Department of Russian language stylistics, where he was later succeeded by Ilya Tolstoy, great-grandson of Leo Tolstoy.

Many graduates of the Faculty of Journalism in the 1970s and 1980s went on to shape modern Russian journalism and television during the period of perestroika, others played leading roles in the history of post-Soviet Russia. Yet Zassoursky believed that journalism did not withstand the test of freedom, arguing that freedom necessarily requires responsibility — not to authorities, but to one's own conscience. Remarkably, despite consistent criticism of contemporary media and politics he was considered not an opponent but a member of Russian establishment.

On November 23, 2007, Zassoursky voluntarily resigned from the post of dean and became president of the Faculty of Journalism of Moscow State University. This position had not previously existed. According to the draft regulations on the president of the faculty, the president was tasked with overseeing the quality of education and research, determining international strategy, advising on key development issues, strengthening ties with the media industry, and promoting ethical principles of the profession. By decision of the Academic Council of Moscow State University on November 6, 2007, Professor Elena Vartanova became acting dean. On June 25, 2008, she was elected dean of the Faculty of Journalism and she still retains that position.

=== Later years ===
In his later years, Zassoursky taught courses like Introduction to World Journalism, History of Foreign Journalism, Modern Foreign Media, and 20th-Century Foreign Literature: Great Britain and the United States. He also conducted special seminars. He believed that Russian scholars had moved to the periphery of global intellectual discussion and argued that returning to engagement with global problems would be inevitable, however painful. At the same time, he was encouraged that surveys showed journalism students primarily sought meaningful professional work rather than merely high incomes. He became increasingly out of sync with the times but remained a moral authority.

In 2004, the publishing house Journalist released the book "The Man-Faculty" about Zassoursky.

Until the last years of his life, he began his mornings with newspapers such as Izvestia, Nezavisimaya Gazeta, and Moskovsky Komsomolets, highlighting authors including Mikhail Rostovsky, Yulia Kalinina, Vsevolod Ovchinnikov, and Irina Petrovskaya. Since 1946, he regularly listened to the BBC, which he considered an exemplary school of objective journalism, and watched CNN and BBC World, subscribed to The Economist and other global media.

=== Death ===
Yassen Zassoursky died in Moscow on August 1, 2021, in his 92nd year. The burial of his ashes took place on September 9 at Troyekurovskoye Cemetery.

== Family ==
His father, Nikolai Vasilyevich Zassoursky (born Storozhev; 1897–1966), worked in the 1920s as an investigator in the Special Department of the Headquarters of the 4th Army and later as an authorized officer of the Cheka and OGPU with special powers and authority. He opposed lawlessness, mass murders, repressions and abuses committed in Crimea at the end of the civil war, and he personally authorised the arrest of the head of the Cheka of Ukraine for 10 days. Fearing reprisals, he changed his surname from Storozhev to Zassoursky. Later he worked in Soviet trade mission in Poland, then, upon return, in the People's Commissariat of Heavy Industry and later in the Research Institute of Industrial Buildings.

His mother, Tatyana Fyodorovna Makarova (1905–1993), was deputy director of the Foreign Literature Publishing House. His parents met in Poland, where his father worked as a Soviet representative of Sovpoltorg and his mother was employed as a typist and stenographer at the embassy. After the Soviet ambassador Pyotr Voykov was murdered in Poland, he and his wife moved back to USSR and started new careers. Tatiana became a doctor, and Nikolai oversaw the industrialization of USSR in terms of industrial construction, recruitment and deals with US enterprises leading to the acquisition and establishment of hundreds of new factories bought in the US. He created and authored Soviet industrial construction standards.

Yassen Zassoursky was married to Svetlana Sherlaimova (1927–2019), the leading expert on Slavic literature and author of books and articles on Jaroslav Hašek, Karel Čapek, Václav Havel, Milan Kundera and many others. He had a son and two grandchildren, one of whom, Ivan Zassoursky, headed the Department of New Media and Communication Theory at the Faculty of Journalism of Moscow State University.

== Personality ==
Faculty members and students treated Zassoursky with great respect, which he earned by consistently acting as an arbiter and defender of his academic community and its freedoms. He was known for refined manners and personal conduct.

Journalist Said Bitsoev wrote that Zassoursky's approach was objective, even-handed, and fair, noting that minor student mischief was often overlooked, while strictness was applied only when necessary to educate true professionals. Lies and plagiarism were not tolerated. In the 21st century Yassen Zassoursky supported open science and open publication of student diplomas, inspiring his grandson Ivan Zassoursky, chair of New Media and an Internet-era media mogul to create startups facilitating such publication, vernsky.ru and nauchkor.ru for communication science and liberal arts respectively as a means to control epidemic of plagiarism by making student papers and diplomas openly accessible.

Yassen Zassoursky defended Rudolf Boretsky, one of the founders of the Department of Television and Radio, during his conflict with the powerful chairman of the State Committee for Television and Radio, Sergey Lapin, over the book "Television Program." Despite pressure, Zassoursky supported Boretsky's doctoral defense and later arranged his long-term teaching assignment in Poland under agreements with the Silesian and Warsaw Universities.

For more than 25 years, Zassoursky maintained a close friendship with writer Gabriel García Márquez, whom he met through UNESCO work in the late 1970s. They collaborated on the commission that prepared the report "Many Voices — One World." Zassoursky later met Márquez in Cuba and corresponded with him for many years. Zassoursky was friends with Ray Bradbury, Kurt Vonnegut and knew many other American writers of his time. He arranged their visits to Moscow and sought to facilitate translation and publication of their works, inviting authors to come and visit Moscow. Beatnik Allen Ginsberg gave a lecture at the faculty and so did Arthur Miller and countless other literary figures and media researchers from all over the world.

== Quotes ==
"Socrates said that a person must always doubt, since doubt develops consciousness. The ability to doubt and not take everything on faith is one of the most important qualities of a journalist."

"The level of freedom of speech today and 20 years ago is approximately the same. Everything depends not on the authorities, but on the journalist: if he is a professional, he will find a way to express his opinion."

"Our press is in many ways freer than American and Western media in general. The American press is very tightly controlled, despite the First Amendment. Look at the confrontation between leading American media and Trump, or how British newspapers covered the Skripal poisoning. They have lost common sense — it is a shameful situation for Western journalism, which was always considered democratic and objective."

"Strangely enough, digital journalism is easier to control than traditional print journalism. A website can be easily blocked."

"Our main problem is that during the new revolution — that is, the transition to the market — universal human values and ideals, ideas of freedom and humanity, were not brought to the forefront."

"Unfortunately, the very concept of genuine freedom — in the name of the human being — did not develop here; it was trampled by commerce."

== Scholarly works ==
- Theodore Dreiser — Writer and Publicist (1957)
- History of Foreign Literature (1959)
- History of Foreign Journalism (1959)
- Journalism in the Political Structure of Society (1975)
- Theodore Dreiser: Life and Work (1977)
- Mark Twain and His Role in the Development of American Realist Literature (1987)
- History of the Press: Anthology (2001)
- The Media System of Russia (2003)
- The Temptation of Freedom. Russian Journalism: 1990–2007 (2007)
- Communication in the Knowledge Society (2013)
- Modern Foreign Media (2013)

== Publishing projects ==
Under the auspices of the Faculty of Journalism, the radio station Echo of Moscow was created. Zassoursky and his colleagues helped secure resources and funding from the Moscow City Council, Ogoniok magazine under Vitaly Korotich, and the USSR Radio Association. After raising funds for the first broadcasts, the founders approached Vladimir Gusinsky and Gazprom. Zassoursky considered the station one of the best in Russia, noting that it sometimes "steps on its own throat in order to give opponents a voice."

At Zassoursky's initiative, collections of works by his favorite journalists, including Yulia Kalinina and Irina Petrovskaya, were published. The rights to his works are represented by an agent, the company "A Right" established by his grandson Ivan Zassoursky.

== Memory ==
At Moscow State University, a commission chaired by Rector Viktor Sadovnichy was established to commemorate Yasen Zasurskiy. Among the unrealized proposals were a student scholarship, a monument on the faculty balustrade, and naming the Faculty of Journalism after him.

=== Yasen Nikolayevich Zassoursky Prize ===
After the professor's death, the Union of Journalists of Russia announced the establishment of the Yasen Nikolayevich Zasurskiy Prize, intended to be awarded to deans and professors of journalism faculties across the country.

Recipients include:

- Elena Vartanova, Dean of the Faculty of Journalism of Moscow State University
- Viktor Tulupov, Dean of the Faculty of Journalism of Voronezh State University
- Alexander Puy, director of the Higher School of Journalism and Mass Communications of Saint Petersburg State University
- Oleg Kuzin, Dean of the Faculty of Social Technologies of the presidential Academy in Saint Petersburg

=== "Golden Gong" — Yasen Zasurskiy Journalism Competition ===
The Alliance of Regional Media Leaders organizes the nationwide journalism competition "Golden Gong" named after Yasen Zasurskiy. The competition is supported by the Ministry of Digital Development, Communications, and Mass Media of the Russian Federation. The competition has been held since 1994 and was named after Professor Zasurskiy in 2022.

=== Yasen Zasurskiy: "Happiness Is in Struggle and Overcoming" ===
The publishing house Molodaya Gvardiya, in The Lives of Remarkable People series, released the book "Yasen Zasurskiy: 'Happiness Is in Struggle and Overcoming.'" The biography was written by G. V. Prutskov, a student and colleague of Zasurskiy at the Department of Foreign Journalism of the Faculty of Journalism of Moscow State University, and a professor at the HSE Institute of Media. Plans for the book were announced in 2021.

== See also ==
- MSU Faculty of Journalism
- Media in Russia
- Glasnost
