= Chastny Korrespondent =

Russian online newspaper

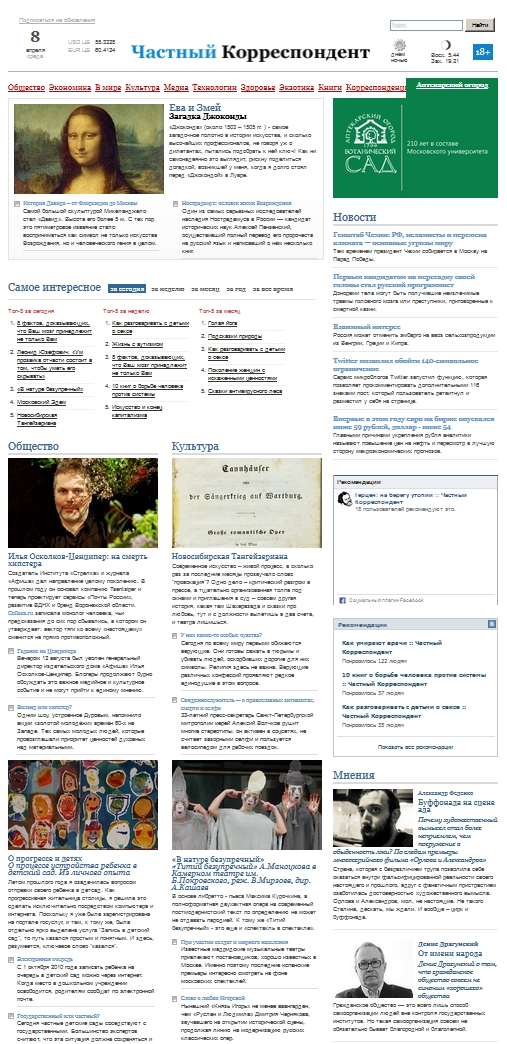
- Screenshot of the publication "Private Correspondent"
- Type: Online newspaper
- Editor-in-chief: Julia Eydel
- Founded: 1 October 2008
- Language: Russian
- Headquarters: Moscow, Russia
- Website: chaskor.ru

Chastny Korrespondent (chaskor.ru, also known as "Chaskor", translated as "Private correspondent") is a Russian online newspaper. Chaskor is Russia's first periodical edition to switch to Creative Commons license. Chaskor publishes analytical articles, reviews, interviews, and news.

== History ==
In 2008 "Chastny Korrespondent" was officially registered in Rospechat.

Ivan Zassoursky founded Chastny Korrespondent and served as chief editor till 2011. He was replaced by Yulia Eydel, previously a columnist in the "Society" and "Exotica" departments, who served as chief editor till 2014.

Chastny Korrespondent became a beta-partner with Facebook at the time Social graph was introduced. The materials used include editions and reprints of collections of blogs, excerpts of books, reprints from trade publications, but most of the articles are written by authors who have sent their texts to Chaskor. Chaskor is not involved in the systems of banner and link exchanges. All the articles pass through the editorial.

Chastny Korrespondent has no base or office and communicates by mail. Most of the articles are written by authors who send their texts to Chaskor.

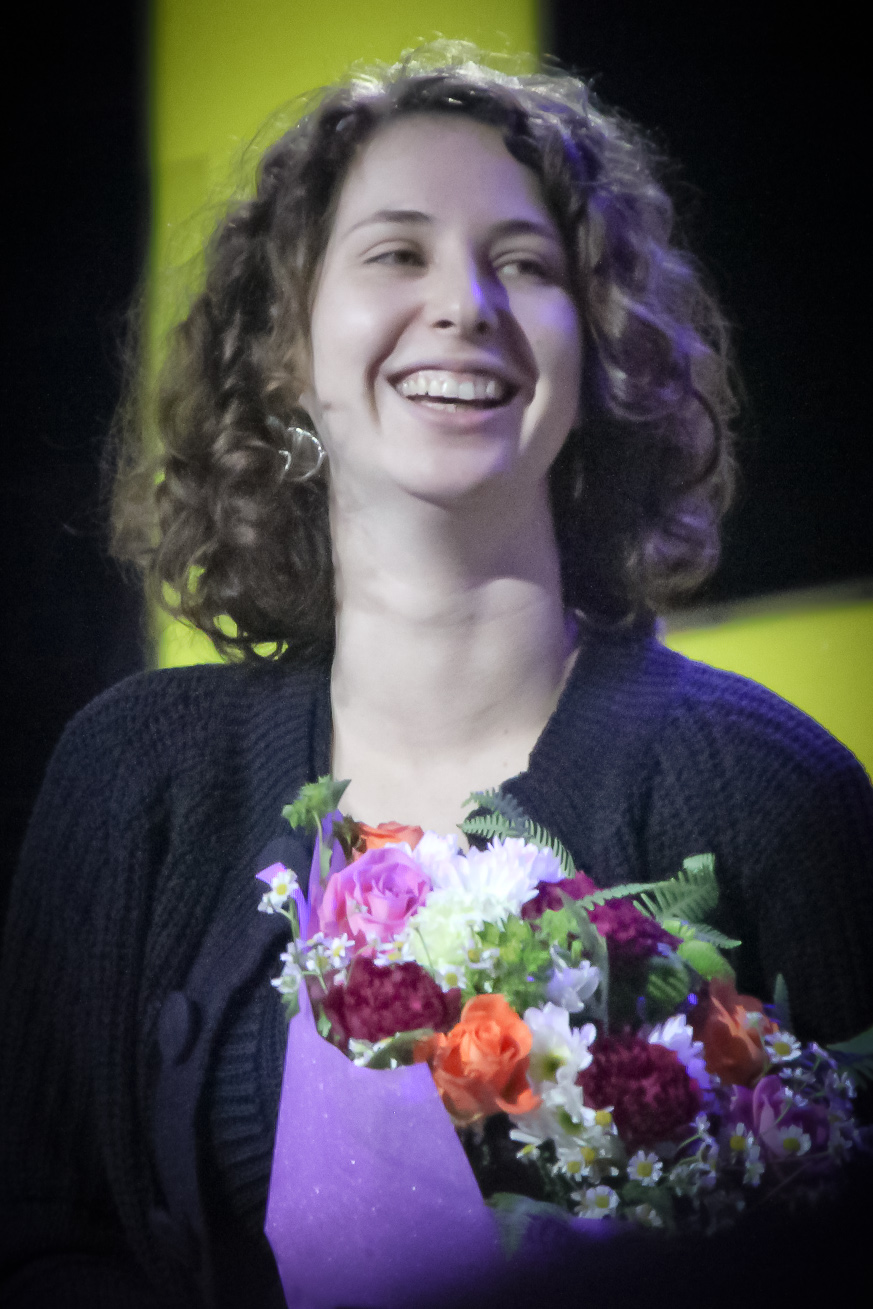
Julia Eydel at Runet Prize Ceremony

== Content ==
All materials in Chaskor are grouped into 50 thematic sections represented by the departments: Society, Economy, Around the world, Culture, Media, Technology, Health, Exotica, Books, and Calendars. Each of the sections is, in turn, divided into 12 sub-sections. The content is presented as reviews and analytical articles, as well as news, reports, and expert opinions.

== "Chaskor" and Creative Commons ==
In 2009, all materials published on Chaskor became available under the Creative Commons Attribution License 3.0. As chief editor Ivan Zassoursky explained, one of the main objectives of this was the desire to help Russian Wikipedia. The republication and use of materials originally published on Chaskor to Wikipedia is legal, without any changes - the "toll-free bridged" concept. According to Zassoursky, the materials of Chaskor "could help the online encyclopedia, because they, on the one hand, provide quality analytics and text, while on the other - meet the requirement of neutrality".

== Awards ==
- 2011 - Runet Prize in nomination "Culture and Mass Communication".
