= Andrei Richter =

Andrei Richter is Professor Researcher at the Comenius University in Bratislava, former senior adviser and director of the Office of the OSCE Representative on Freedom of the Media in Vienna.

Born in 1959 in Kharkiv, Ukraine, he has university degrees in law, foreign languages, and a doctorate degree in journalism. In 2015 he became a habilitated professor of mass media studies in Slovakia. Richter was a Commissioner of the International Commission of Jurists (ICJ) in 2000-2013 and co-chair of the Law Section of the International Association for Media and Communication Research in 1996-2010.

Richter was director and founder of the Media Law and Policy Institute (also known as Media Law and Policy Center, Institute for Information Law) and edited the only regular publication on media law in Russian (ZiP), 1994-2011, and co-edited the only bulletin on media law in the region - Post-Soviet Media Law and Policy Newsletter, 1993–99, and sits on editorial boards of a number of international journals on communications and the media. For about 20 years he taught media law and foreign media/journalism classes at Lomonosov Moscow State University Faculty of Journalism, serving for the last few years as its chair for media law and modern history of journalism. He authored over 250 publications on freedom of the media, media law and policy in Russian, English, Albanian, Armenian, Azeri, Bosnian, Ukrainian, Serbian, Slovak, German and French, including the only standard textbook on media law for journalism students of Russian colleges and universities (2002, 2009 and 2016), a textbook on online media law (2014), a book of reading materials on media law for students and journalists (2004, 2011), a UNESCO textbook on international standards of media freedom (2011, in Russian) and a UNESCO publication – a book titled Post-Soviet Perspective on Censorship and Freedom of the Media (2007).

In the 1990s Richter was the Moscow Representative and later - a member of the International Commission on Radio and Television Policy (co-chaired by Pres. Jimmy Carter and Eduard Sagalaev]=), Visiting Professor in Journalism at Belmont University in Nashville, Tennessee, and a visiting researcher at the Gannett Media Studies Center at Columbia University, NYC, where he is still an expert. He is an adjunct professor at the Webster Private University in Vienna, and a non-resident fellow at the Central European University in Budapest.

Permanently lives in Vienna, Austria.

== Sources ==
- Moscow Media Law and Policy Institute
- International Association for Media and Communication Research
- Andrei Richter for The Guardian-1
- Andrei Richter for The Guardian-2
- Andrei Richter for Voice of Russia
