= Vladislav Flyarkovsky =

Russian journalist (born 1958)

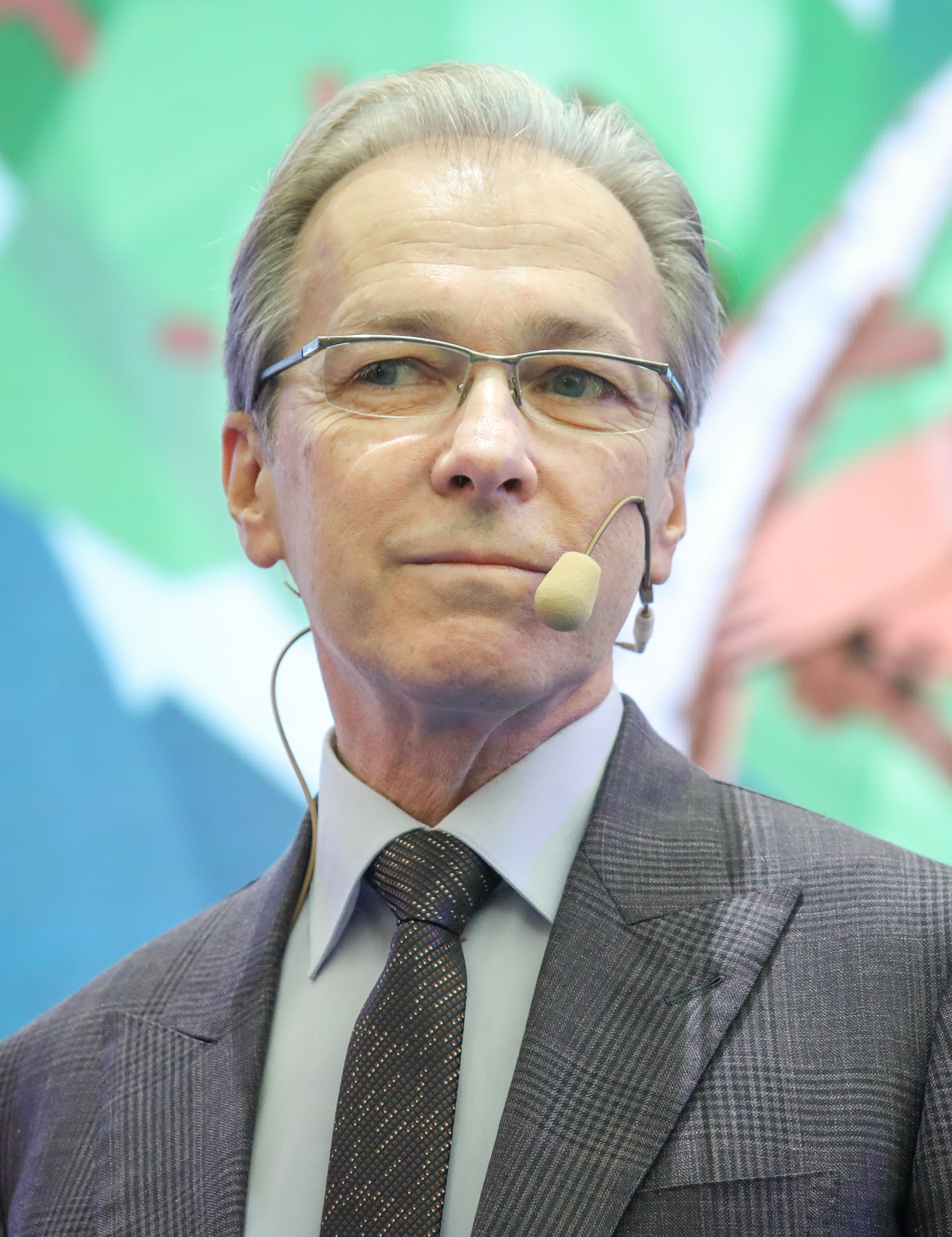
- Born: Vladislav Pierovich Flyarkovsky; 15 March 1958 (age 68); Oktyabrsky, Republic of Bashkortostan, USSR
- Occupation: Journalist
- Spouse: Maria Rozovskaya
- Children: 2
- Awards: (2008)

Vladislav Pierovich Flyarkovsky (Russian: Владислав Пьерович Флярковский; born March 15, 1958, in Oktyabrsky, Republic of Bashkortostan, USSR) is a Russian journalist, broadcaster, television commentator Russia-K, lading news programs. A member of the public council of the Russian Jewish Congress.

== Biography ==
Born March 15, 1958, in the town of Oktyabrsky in Bashkiria, where at that time remained after the link his maternal grandfather Leopold Hristianovich. Newborn he was brought to Baku, the hometown of the parents of Vladislav, where he grew up to 12 years.

In 1975 he graduated from the Moscow school No. 591. At the same time he tried to enter the MArchI. From 1976 to 1979 he served in the Far East, in parts of the sea to ensure the Soviet Navy. In 1979, after unsuccessful attempts to enter the VGIK at the camera faculty he enrolled and graduated in 1985 of MSU Faculty of Journalism, TV department. He was taught by Marina Goldovskaya and Sergei Muratov. From 1985 to 1987, he served as the editor-publisher of scientific propaganda department of the Mikhail Glinka Musical Culture Museum.

As a reporter, presenter, commentator, author, program managers and editors working in different TV companies, the longest and currently All-Russia State Television and Radio Broadcasting Company, in the mid-1990s was a correspondent and bureau chief of VGTRK in Tel Aviv (Israel), the first permanently accredited in the State Russian TV journalist.

Since 1986, he worked as a reporter, presenter, commentator, columnist in the programs 12th Floor, Vzglyad, Vremya.

Since November 1998 and June 1999 — the editor in chief of TV news service channel TV-6. In 1999-2000 he worked on the channel TV Tsentr, where the conducted analysis program Nedelya.

In 2000-2001 he led the Russian-language news broadcasts on a Ukrainian ICTV Channel, alternating with Dmitry Kiselyov

Since 2001 he leads Culture News on the channel Russia-K. Since November 2015 - the Saturday edition of Culture News from Vladislav Flyarkovsky.

Flyarkovsky also worked closely with the radio Echo of Moscow, was the author of the weekly comments, participated in the creation of auditions for the novel Strugatsky brothers Hard to be a God.

He is professionally engaged in photography. He opened several exhibitions, and has released a photobook Avtobiografika in 2014.

Nominated for the award TEFI in the nomination Host information program (1997, 2007).
