= Generation P (film) =

Generation П
- Theatrical release poster
- Directed by: Victor Ginzburg
- Written by: Victor Ginzburg; Gina Ginzburg
- Produced by: Aleksei Ryazancev; Stas Ershov; Gina Ginzburg; Victor Ginzburg; Andrew Paulson; Jim Steele; Andrei Vasiliev; Ivan Zassoursky
- Starring: Vladimir Epifantsev; Mikhail Yefremov; Andrei Fomin
- Cinematography: Aleksei Rodionov
- Edited by: Anton Anisimov; Karolina Machievska; Irakly Kvirikadze; Vladimir Markov
- Music by: Kaveh Cohen, Michael David Nielsen, Alexander Hacke, Sergey Shnurov
- Production companies: Karo; Gorky Film Studio
- Release date: April 14, 2011
- Running time: 112 minutes
- Country: Russia
- Language: Russian
- Budget: $7 million
- Box office: $4 million

Generation P (Russian: Generation "П") is a 2011 independent Russian film, written and directed by Victor Ginzburg and based on Victor Pelevin’s 1999 novel of the same name. It received positive reviews from international critics.

== Plot ==
"Generation P" follows the strange adventures of Babylen Tatarsky as he evolves from a disillusioned young man in the drab days of post-communist Moscow to the chief “creative” behind the virtual world of Russian politics.

When Babylen was a Young Pioneer, his generation received a gift from the decaying Soviet state in the form of a bottle of Pepsi, of Russian manufacture. Not just a beverage, it was also a symbol of hope that someday, a new, magical life would arrive from the other side of the ocean. The arrival of this life, and the way it transformed these ex-Pioneers, is what the film is about. In the early Nineties, Tatarsky, a frustrated poet, takes a job as an advertising copywriter, and discovers a knack for putting a distinctively Russian twist on Western-style ads. But the deeper Tatarsky sinks into the advertising world, the more he wonders if he has sacrificed too much for money. His soaring success leads him into a surreal world of spin doctors, gangsters, drug trips, and the spirit of Che Guevara who, via a Ouija Board, imparts to him the dazzling theory of WOWism, about how television destroys the individual spirit. Though named in honor of Lenin, Babylen opts instead to believe in his “Babylonian” destiny, and secretly searches for the beautiful goddess Ishtar, who becomes for him a symbol of fortune. Meanwhile, the people around Babylen - clients, colleagues - perish in the violent dog-eat-dog world of new Russian capitalism. In Nineties Moscow, this is taken as the ordinary course of daily affairs. Tatarsky is invited to join an all-powerful PR firm run by a cynically ruthless advertising genius, Leonid Azadovsky, who invites Tatarsky to participate in a secret process of rigged elections and false political advertising. And as a result of his brilliance, Tatarsky achieves the ultimate, as he creates and gets elected a "virtual" president. But like Faust selling his soul to the devil, this ex-humanist gradually descends to the level of a reprobate, finding that he no longer belongs to himself, but is trapped in a virtual world of his own creation. Babylen returns to his Buddhist friend Gireyev and takes hallucinogenic mushrooms, in attempt to re-create his previous experience. In a ritualistic Sumerian initiation, Babylen replaces Azadovsky as head of the Agency and becomes the earthly husband of Goddess Ishtar, the object of his obsession. There, he is offered control of the mechanism that produces “simple human happiness” - and can control the world.

== Cast ==
- Vladimir Epifantsev as Babilen Tatarsky
- Mikhail Yefremov as Leonid (Legion) Azadovsky
- Andrei Fomin as Sergei Morkovin
- Vladimir Menshov as Farsuk Farseykin
- Alexander Gordon as Hanin
- Oleg Taktarov as Vovchik
- Renata Litvinova as Alla
- Andrei Panin as Kolya the driver/ Nikolai Smirnov
- Sergey Shnurov as Gireyev
- Leonid Parfyonov as TV journalist
- Amaliya Goldanskaya as Lena
- Andrei Vasiliev as Azadovsky's advisor
- Roman Trakhtenberg as Sasha Blo
- Ivan Okhlobystin as Malyuta
- Elena Polyakova
- Marianna Maksimovskaya
- Igor Grigoriev
- Yulia Bordovskih
- Igor Mirkurbanov as Dima Pugin
- Yuriy Safarov as Gussein

"I've always been drawn to stories that challenge the norm, and go beyond what¹s considered reality. I found Pelevin's brand of cyberpunk mysticism very appealing - dark, with a great sense of humor, and full of revelations about the world we live in. Generation P combined a lot of what I've lived through, both personally as a former creative in the service of the goddess Ishtar, and historically, as someone who closely witnessed the huge transformation in Russian society after communism."

— Victor Ginzburg

== Production ==
=== Filming ===
In 2006, Victor Ginzburg began writing and directing an adaptation of Victor Pelevin's 1999 novel Babylon. Production faced significant financial challenges due to limited backing from the Russian film industry, rejection of government subsidy applications, and skepticism from television networks. Although completed and released under the auspices of the Gorky Film Studio, Ginzburg independently raised the film's $7 million budget. Funding shortages halted production three times—including during the 2008 financial crisis—extending the production timeline to five years (2006–2011). At the rough-cut stage, Konstantin Ernst acquired the television premiere rights for Channel One.

== Release ==
According to director Victor Ginzburg, distributor Karo Film expressed concern that state regulators would deny the film a distribution license due to its political content and profanity. However, following a four-year independent production period, the film built significant online interest, attracting over one million YouTube trailer views and 40,000 followers on social media, and Generation P was officially released in Russia, Ukraine, and Kazakhstan on April 14, 2011. The film received generally positive reviews from critics and became the highest-grossing Russian film of the spring-summer 2011 season.

=== Marketing ===
The film received partial financing and marketing support from some of the major brands that appear in it, without which this story would be impossible to tell. Ginzburg was able to get the freedom to integrate selected brands organically into the story, without the dreaded restrictions, associated with "product placement". The film's irreverent storytelling demanded unabashed satire and humor, but the historic placement and tremendous PR values compensated the risks. Both Coca-Cola and PepsiCo participated, since both had historical roles to play in epic story of the new Russia. Other brands included Snickers, American Express, Tic-Tac, Smirnoff, Range Rover, Panasonic, Nokia and Apple. Leading Russian search engine Yandex and mobile provider Megafon also played roles and contributed greatly to both the budget and the promotion of the film. Facebook had recently entered the Russian market and contributed a sizable budget to the promotion of the film in order to connect with the progressive audience in Russia. The brand cross-promo marketing value of Generation P was estimated at $2.5M and compensated greatly for marginal advertising by the distributor.

== Reception ==
=== Box office ===
Generation P was #3 in the Russian Box Office after the first weekend with a total of $2,094,414 (Russia)on 527 screens. The film went on to gross about $4.7M in CIS and became the highest grossing Russian film of spring-summer 2011.

=== Critical response ===
Generation P received generally positive reviews from critics. On review aggregator website Rotten Tomatoes, the film holds an approval rating of 75%, based on 12 reviews, with an average rating of 6.60/10. On Metacritic, the film has a weighted average score of 65 out of 100, based on seven critics, indicating "generally favorable reviews".

Several critics highlighted the film's visual style and its surreal treatment of advertising, politics and post-Soviet society. Jeannette Catsoulis of The New York Times described the film as a commentary on advertising and political persuasion, while The Wall Street Journal characterized it as an unusually overlooked film and a commentary on contemporary Russian culture.

The film's visual and stylistic experimentation was also noted by critics. Slant Magazine compared its essayistic approach to the work of Jean-Luc Godard, while Variety described it as a stylized examination of the period following the end of the Cold War. Roger Ebert's review for the Chicago Sun-Times similarly emphasized the film's combination of satire and psychedelic imagery.

Other reviews similarly focused on the film's surrealism and political themes. HuffPost praised its visual and philosophical ambition, while The Village Voice interpreted the film as a surreal depiction of the Putin era. Time Out New York viewed the film's themes as extending beyond Russia to broader questions about the influence of media and advertising.

=== Awards and nominations ===
==== Wins ====
- 2011 — Karlovy Vary International Film Festival: Special Jury Mention
- 2011 — Sputnik Over Poland: Audience Award
- 2012 — Sofia International Film Festival: Special Jury Prize
- 2012 — Almaty International Film Festival: Best Feature Film Debut

==== Nominations ====
- 2012 — Palm Springs International Film Festival: New Voices/New Visions Grand Jury Prize
- 2011 — White Square Award: Nominated for Generation P (cinematography by Alexei Rodionov).
- 2011 — Nika Award: Nominated for Generation P (cinematography by Alexei Rodionov).

The film was also selected for the Vanguard Program at the 2011 Toronto International Film Festival and for the 2012 New Directors/New Films program at MoMA and Lincoln Center. It served as the opening film of the 2011 London Russian Film Festival and was named Time Out London's Critics’ Choice of the Week.

== See also ==
- Generation "П" – The 1999 novel by Victor Pelevin on which the film is based
- Empire V (film) – A 2022 film adaptation of Pelevin's companion novel, also directed by Victor Ginzburg
- Branded (2012 film) – A 2012 satirical science fiction film set in Moscow exploring corporate branding and manipulation
