= The Restless Garden =

- Directed by: Victor Ginzburg
- Distributed by: Heartland Films
- Release date: January 15, 1993
- Running time: 1 hour 26 minutes
- Country: Russia

The Restless Garden is a 1993 film directed by Victor Ginzburg.

== Premise ==
The Restless Garden is a documentary film portrait of the nascent sexual revolution that accompanied the fall of the Soviet Union, directed by Los Angeles-based Russian-American film maker Victor Ginzburg.

In the movie, performance artists, heavy metal musicians, professional and amateur dancers, an experimental theatre director, a feted choreographer, a ballerina-turned-stripper, and a would-be Russian Hugh Hefner all share the same view: that the Soviet system had fundamentally de-sexed men and women and that Russia was far behind the West in terms of sexual freedom. The film balances the thoughtful and deeply considered opinions of Ginzburg's, mostly young, subjects with multiple scenes of nudity as they act on their new found freedoms. In the words of some of the film’s interviewees:

"For over 70 years in our country… there has been the so-called sexless art. In other words, on stage there was no man or woman: there was a chairman of a collective farm, a manager of a huge factory, and a worker. And there was no Man and Woman — the principle beings on Earth." Valery Nikolayevich Baglay, artistic director, Theater of the Absurd

"Sex is not developed in this country. The period of ‘Stagnation’ left its mark...I think one has to be free, without complexes... In the future I want to be a porn star." Masha, erotic dancer for heavy metal band, Metal Corrosion

"When people ask me how I get my ideas I quote Akhmatova: “If you only knew from what filth poems grow, not knowing a trace of shame." Choreographer Alla Sigalova, quoting Anna Akhmatova.

== Context ==
The Restless Garden may be seen as the first episode in a series that chart director Victor Ginzburg's relationship with his motherland following the fall of the Soviet Union. A decade after completing this documentary, Ginzburg produced and directed the feature Generation P (2012), based on the novel by Victor Pelevin. Set in the years immediately following the collapse of the Soviet Union it imagines a fable-like reality in which a former poetry teacher turned advertising man helps promote an empty shell as the new leader for the country. In 2019 Ginzburg completed work on Empire V (2022), a fantastical satire of the Russian elite, that portrays them as an ancient tribe of vampires who feed on humanity's desire for wealth. Also based on a Pelevin novel, the film was banned by the Kremlin in 2022 as Russian tanks rolled into Ukraine.

== Production ==
"In the summer of 1991, I landed in Moscow to shoot an underground film about counterculture and erotic art in the Soviet Union. A year prior, I returned to the city of my birth for the first time since immigrating to USA as a kid. It was on that first trip that I discovered the underground culture of performance and erotic art boiling beneath the rigid surface of the decaying Soviet system. I came back a year later with a load of Kodak film stock, determined to make a film about these amazing people. The Russian economy was in shambles, there was a lack of everything and there was lawlessness as local mafias began to take over. The air was thick with discontent and fear of the government crack down.

"We shot without permits and processed film at night in Soviet labs with the help of like-minded Russians. The film negative had to be smuggled out of the country. A month after we finished shooting the Soviet regime collapsed due to the failed KGB coup in August, 1991, served as an epic finale of the film." Victor Ginzburg

== Release ==
After a successful festival run and limited theatrical release in the US in 1993 the film played for a year in 1993-1994 at the central Moscow movie theater “Moskva” but never aired on broadcast TV or mainstream cable at the time due to censorship of nudity and wound up languishing on a shelf for years. over 25.

In March 2021 a restored version was premiered at the Artdocfest festival in Moscow's biggest movie theater "October" as part of the "Artdocfest" documentary film festival.

In July 2023 Restless Garden premiered on www.votvot.tv Radio Free Europe / Radio Liberty’s on-demand Russian-language streaming platform for voices targeted and silenced by the Putin regime, launched in April 2023. As part of RFE/RL’s comprehensive strategy to counter Kremlin disinformation, Votvot features cultural content inaccessible inside Russia from creators who are often banned because of their criticism of the full-scale invasion of Ukraine.

== Critical response ==
Jay Boyar for the Orlando Sentinel found the film "often-astonishing" but asked, “The wall is down and the lid is off. Now what?” Daniel Kimmel writing for Variety, however, noted that “the film is not endorsing the rationalizations and banalities of the creators of Soviet erotica, but simply recording a moment when everything seemed possible and no-one knew how long it would last…. Ginzburg makes his clearest point when he interviews a young Moscow prostitute who plies her trade because she wants to afford the makeup and clothes she sees on other women."

Anton Dolin commented "Ginzburg's film creates a grandiose impression just as a document of the era... It's a reminder that if there was never a free Russia, then a Russia that truly thirsted for freedom was once a possibility - and even a reality."

During the press conference after the premiere in Moscow in 1993 the film was attacked by Russian film critics for his portrayal of Russian women: “During the discussion, film critics, flushed with champagne, accused the director of an authoritarian retelling of the events of bygone days, of wanting to present a Russian woman as an unbridled street girl. The director's attempts to counter criticism with positive reviews from the Western press were drowned in rude cries like "Who do we even listen to?"

“Во время дискуссии разгоряченные шампанским кинокритики обвинили режиссера в авторитарном пересказе событий давно минувших дней, в желании представить русскую женщину разнузданной уличной девкой. Попытки режиссера противостоять критике с помощью положительных рецензии западной прессы, потонули в грубых выкриках типа "Кого мы вообще слушаем?"

2023 review in Meduza: “…Ginzburg's film makes a grandiose impression simply as a document of the era. It was not so long ago, but it is extremely difficult to believe in the reality of what is happening on the screen. Every frame is saturated with sex, and this concerns by no means only the Restless Garden. Before the eyes of the viewer, the current stereotypes that the brief period of political freedom in Russia was an accident, or even an imitation, a hoax, are being destroyed. Before us is a panorama of a country in which freedom has become the highest value. Civic consciousness in this new system of priorities is inextricably linked with the body.” “… картина Гинзбурга производит грандиозное впечатление уже просто как документ эпохи. Не так это было давно, но поверить в реальность происходящего на экране крайне сложно. Сексом пропитан каждый кадр, и касается это отнюдь не одного Нескучного сада. На глазах зрителя разрушаются нынешние стереотипы о том, что краткий период политической свободы в России был сбоем по фазе, случайностью, а то и имитацией, розыгрышем. Перед нами развернута панорама страны, в которой свобода стала высшей ценностью. Гражданское самосознание в этой новой системе приоритетов неразрывно связано с телом.”

== Accolades ==
The film was screened at many international film festivals, IDFA in Amsterdam and Mostra in São Paulo.

== Notes ==
The Orlando Sentinel. June 1, 1993
