= Babylon (book) =

Novel by Russian author Victor Pelevin

- Author: Victor Pelevin
- Original title: Generation «П»
- Translator: Andrew Bromfield
- Language: Russian
- Genre: Novel
- Publication date: 1999
- Publication place: Russia
- Media type: Print (Paperback)
- Pages: 256 pp
- ISBN: 0-14-200181-3
- OCLC: 51522316

Babylon, (Note: In original Russian-language release, the book is known as Generation «П» or Поколение «П» (Pokoleniye "P"), with Cyrillic pe (П), being an equivalent to Latin P. It directly translates to Generation "P".) known in the US as Homo Zapiens, is the third novel by Russian author Victor Pelevin. Published in 1999, it tells the story of Babylen Tatarsky, a Moscow 'creative' and advertising copywriter. The story deals with themes of post-Soviet Russia, consumerism, recreational drug use, and Mesopotamian mythology.

Andrew Bromfield's English translation was published as Babylon by Faber and Faber in 2000 and as Homo Zapiens by Viking Press in 2002.

A film adaptation by Victor Ginzburg was released in Russia on 14 April 2011.

== List of chapters ==
1. Generation 'P'
2. Draft Podium
3. Tikhamat-2
4. The Three Riddles of Ishtar – Tatarsky runs into his old classmate, Gireiev, and visits his home outside of Moscow. Gireiev and Tatarsky consume some fly agaric mushrooms. Tatarsky, hallucinating, enters an abandoned construction site, viewing it as the ziggurat he read of in chapter three.
5. Poor Folk
6. The Path to Your Self
7. Homo Zapiens – Using a ouija board Tatarsky summons the spirit of Che Guevara to ask him about advertising. By means of automatic writing, Guevara dictates a polemic on the nature of television, based on the thought of Buddhist teacher Siddhārtha Gautama.
8. Safe Haven
9. The Babylonian Stamp
10. Wee Vova
11. The Institute of Apiculture
12. Cloud in Pants
13. The Islamic Factor
14. Critical Times
15. The Golden Room – Tatarsky attends a reception in a bunker below the Ostankino TV Tower. He is dressed with a mirror and a mask and taken to the golden room, where he looks into the sacred eye. Azadovsky is strangled. Tatarsky is declared to be ritual husband of the goddess Ishtar.
16. Tuborg Man – in his role as husband of Ishtar, Tatarsky appears in innumerable television commercials. In the final scene, he is seen as a weary traveller in a commercial for Tuborg beer.

== Characters ==
- Vavilen Tatarsky (Babylen Tatarsky in the English translation) – The hero of the story, Tatarsky is a former student of the Literary Institute of Moscow and a disillusioned poet. In chapter two, he meets a former classmate and becomes an advertising copywriter. In the Russian original, his name is an acronym of Vasily Aksenov and Vladimir Ilyich Lenin, giving V.A.V.I.Len. In Bromfield's translation, "Babylen" instead combines Yevgeny Yevtushenko's poem "Babi Yar" with Lenin, preserving the resemblance to Babylon.
- Hussein – a Chechen mobster who provides 'security' at the kiosks where Tatarsky works in chapter two. He is addicted to opiates and Sufi music. He recognises Tatarsky in chapter 10, shortly after Tatarsky's hallucinogenic experience. Hussein then detains Tatarsky, but Tatarsky is released by Wee Vova, who is his boss Khanin's protection.
- Sergei Morkovin – a classmate from the Literary Institute. Morkovin gets Tatarsky his first advertising job at Draft Podium. He appears again in chapter 11, getting Tatarsky a position at the Institute of Apiculture. In chapter 12 he inducts Tatarsky into the institute's secrets.
- Andrei Gireiev – another classmate from the Literary Institute. In chapter four he introduces Tatarsky to the fly agaric mushroom. In chapter nine he talks Tatarsky down after his LSD-induced hallucination. He supplies Tatarsky mushrooms one more time in chapter 14.
- The Sirruf – this is a winged, dog-like dragon which appears to Tatarsky during a hallucinogenic trance in chapter nine. Amongst other things, it claims it is guardian to the Tower of Babel.
- Farsuk Seiful-Farseikin – TV political analyst at the institute. He inducts Tatarsky into the society in the penultimate chapter.

== Plot ==
The novel is set in Moscow in the Yeltsin years, the 1990s, a time of rampant chaos and corruption. Its protagonist, Babylen Tatarsky, a former Literary Institute student and poet, has been tossed onto the streets after the fall of the Soviet Union where he soon learns his true calling: developing Russian versions of western advertisements. But the more he succeeds as a copywriter, the more he searches for meaning in a culture now defined by material possessions and self-indulgence. He attempts to discover the forces that determine individual desires and shape collective belief in this post-Soviet world. In this quest, Tatarsky sees coincidences that suggest patterns that in turn suggest a hidden meaning behind the chaos of life. He first senses this hidden purpose when reading about Mesopotamian religious practices. Tatarsky's quest is enhanced by the consumption of hallucinogenic mushrooms, cocaine, and vodka. His quest is further aided by another form of spirits: through a ouija board, Che Guevara writes a treatise on identity, consumerism, and television. Eventually, Tatarsky begins to learn some truths—for instance, that all of politics and the "real" events broadcast on television are digital creations. But he can never quite discover the ultimate force behind these fabrications. When at last he reaches the top of the corporate pyramid, Tatarsky learns that the members of his firm are servants of the goddess Ishtar, whose corporeal form consists of the totality of advertising images. The firm's chief duty is to make sure that Ishtar's enemy, the dog Phukkup, does not awaken, bringing with it chaos and destruction. After a ritual sacrifice, Tatarsky becomes the goddess's new ritual husband. In the novel's last chapter, Tatarsky's electronic double becomes a ubiquitous presence on Russian TV. Tatarsky, who had tried to look past the false images presented on TV to see a true unmediated reality, has himself been transformed into an illusion.

The opening chapter identifies the "P" with Pepsi, evoking the Soviet generation raised on the soft drink. Roman Ivashkiv notes that critics have also associated the letter with Pelevin, postmodernism and the Russian obscenity Pizdets.

== Major themes ==
=== Mesopotamian mythology ===
Motifs from Mesopotamian mythology are widely represented in the book by various references, symbolic coincidences and the final denouement. Tatarsky encounters this mythology in a fictional antiquarian text, "Babylon: The Three Chaldean Riddles", which he reads in "Tikhamat-2". The most prominent image is the one of Ishtar – goddess, feminine origin related to Venus. It's the most constant and significant theme, the rest appears as a support for it. The idea beneath the motif of Mesopotamian Mythology seem to serve the purpose of deification of advertising as in the end the most powerful media corporation appears to be a Chaldean Guild sustaining (preserving) the balance between good and evil by means of deft informational manipulations. Tatarsky's experimenting with fly agaric mushrooms (Amanita muscaria species) that give him creative inspiration also has mythological background – within the novel's mythology, fly agarics are sacred mushrooms of Ishtar, consequently it looks like the goddess inspires him. Tatarsky's name also bears a sign of symbolism – Vavilen, apart from being an acronym from the names of Vasily Aksyonov and Vladimir Ilyich Lenin, can also be interpreted as a variation of the word Babylon, or Vavilon in Russian.

=== Consumerism ===
The subject of consumerism is discussed on several levels:
– Conceptual level. Society is presented as a primitive abstract organism – oranus. Oranus is a virtual embodiment of man's longing for possession. On biological level, it is equal to a multi-cell primitive mollusk. However it is able to steer society's economic processes by means of various media and among others advertising.
– The theme of advertising creates the ground-level of the novel. It depicts the mechanics by means of which one group of people stimulates consumption of goods by the other group of people at the same time fulfilling their own demand for material values.
– Material level. Set in post-Soviet Russia the image of materialistic approach to life is especially successful because Soviet attachment to things, stemming from the constant lack of material goods during the seventy year Soviet period, is incomparable to any other. Therefore, when Pelevin captured the stage of initial "making up for things amassment" the effect turned out to be particularly powerful. The most successful image in the book is the exhibition of monetarist minimalism – an exposition of certificates issued by various auctions and art dealers confirming the price paid for this or another work of art.
– Drug abuse as a signifier of status. Tatarsky presents a specific approach to taking drugs as a marking point on the social level. Discussed in latter chapter.

=== The role of drug use in the book ===
There are three drug-related themes in the book, all of them symbolizing and relating to different issues. Tatarsky's first hallucinogenic experience is eating fly agarics with his institute mate Gireyev, who has turned to various kinds of esoteric and Buddhist learnings. This experience is one of the bonds tying the plot of the book to Mesopotamian mythology. In the novel's mythology, fly agaric is a sacred mushroom of Ishtar the most prominent female deity, feminine origin, and also a symbol of a starry sky. In Mesopotamian cosmology she was related to Venus, the morning star. The novel relates that fly agaric mushrooms were given to the contestants (participants of the so-called Grand Lottery also called The Game Without a Name, which requires that the contestant answers the three Chaldean riddles) before he is allowed to ascend Ishtar's ziggurat (or the Tower of Babel), and suggests that the "ascent" may be a hallucinogenic "trip" or an effect of A. Muscaria induced intoxication. In a similar manner Tatarsky perceives that the Biblical phrase – mixing of the tongues, or loss of ability to understand another person's language (which the Bible interprets as a consequence of divine wrath and the reason the Tower of Babel was left unfinished) should be understood literally as "mixing of the tongue" meaning that a heavily intoxicated person appears to others to be speaking "gibberish". The novel is rather unclear whether Tatarsky ingested only the Muscaria species of Amanita family. Gireiev assures Tatarsky that there are "no brown ones" in the tea he made, and yet, during their walk in the forest Tatarsky picks up and ingests a brown "mukhomor" (Fly Agaric in Russian) and later, during his LSD trip he is lectured by a mythical guard of the Babel Tower, – Siruf, against the use of Pantherine mushrooms among other substances. Since Amanita Pantherina is brown in colour unlike its red cousin Muscaria, and differs in its effects, it is likely the author implies that Tatarsky ingested both varieties.

The other two experiences are juxtaposed with each other. Tatarsky's cocaine abuse signifies rather his social status than the addiction itself. Vavilen himself notes that it is the price of the drug that counts and that if glue cost a thousand dollars for a tube it would be the top trend drug taken by all the celebrities. The other issue he pays attention to is the way to take cocaine – to sniff it through a hundred dollar bill. Thus the essence of cocaine intake is in its material value, and the status it gives you not the physical experience itself, and what's more, physical experience of cocaine is, contrary to what it is typically described as in the literature, – hardly pleasant. Tatarsky suspects that the mixture is made up of mostly worthless cut and a small amount of amphetamines rather than cocaine. LSD, on the contrary, is represented by the drug pusher (a minor personage of the novel) as a "pure drug", a psychedelic that let us experience spiritual enlightenment. Acid is also a kind of transition between ancient stimulants like mushrooms and modern synthetic drugs, which combines modern technology and ancient purpose. The picture printed on an LSD blotter stamp is perceived by the dealer to influence the effects of LSD acting similarly to an advertisement, imprinting certain associations upon the user. While tripping on 5 hits of LSD with a picture of some Babylonian-looking idol character Tatarsky begins to see an uncanny parallel between the TV set and Chaldean altar for human sacrifice. The TV through advertising incorporated in it, feeds the viewer to the flames of material consumption and Tatarsky, being a copywriter, begins to see himself as a serviceman of such an inferno. The irony here is that if LSD does in fact make Tatarsky experience some form of spiritual enlightenment, then aesthetic enjoyment or clarity of thought do not seem to be among its necessary ingredients. Tatarsky experiences a rather frightening trip, at the end of which, taken over by remorse and piety he creates a humorous yet cynical TV advertisement for none other but Jesus Christ himself (in his fantasized ad Jesus comes out of a white luxury car as a halo of bright light from which are seen only a hand on the car's door and a foot stepping outside. The scene is accompanied by slogan "Reputable Lord for reputable lords").

=== Mammon – Oranus ===
Pelevin employs a similar motif to one that belongs to William S. Burroughs namely of "one all-purpose blob" as a metaphor for a society subdued to consumerism. Like Burroughs' blob, representing degradation of "ordinary men and women" to an organ that can fulfill their basic bodily needs, Pelevin's oranus represent degradation of an individual to a cell in biologically (if such term can be applied to a concept) primitive but at the same time powerful organism that governs our consumer habits. In order to govern and spur the constant flow of money and goods, which play a role of blood and lymph, oranus uses media as a kind of nervous system to steer its cells' activity, namely selling and buying. What is important, is that Pelevin's oranus, is built upon already existing psychological needs of consumption and defecation. When one envies and admires the way a TV character displays wealth or "class" the former is displaying what Pelevin calls oral wow-factor. When, conversely, one lavishly spends money or displays "class" for others to envy and admire, one is displaying anal wow-factor. The displacing wow-factor ensures that one perpetually attempts to "climb the ladder of success". The author parallels this to a Babylonian myth in which human beings were created out of beads. A bead serves as an exact representation of oranus, – a human being who swallows the golden thread only to have it come out of his rear end and who in so doing ends up being suspended on the thread. In the end we may conclude that human psyche creates a concept to which it finally subdues itself and part of which it becomes.

=== Conspiracy theory ===
Pelevin presents a vision of the world governed by virtual puppets created, upgraded and controlled by the media corporations. Hans Günther interprets the novel's treatment of television and advertising as a dissolution of the distinction between reality and illusion, in which consumers lose their sense of identity.

== Features of the novel ==
Critic Mikhail Sverdlov identifies stylistic flaws in Pelevin's prose, the most common of which are tautologies and literary clichés that the author uses when moving from episode to episode. He argues that the author often uses the same epithets to describe different subjects, and the prose is written in non-literary language. The novel contains profanity, which is also disliked by many critics.

The novel's loosely fractured composition allowed many witty reprises to be inserted into the text. Many critics argue that the novel "Generation P" consists of a mixture of disparate anecdotes, urban folklore, American mass culture, and the language of the novel consists of criminal slang, youth slang, terminological volapuks, advertising and PR. There are constant English-language insertions in the text of the novel.

The novel's stylistic foundation is a legacy of Hemingway's intellectual romance, Salinger's adapted Buddhism, the Strugatsky brothers' Aesopian futurology with the addition of Castaneda's psychedelics and Irvine Welsh's fractured ecstasy, as critic Dmitry Golynko-Wolfson said about the novel.

Golynko-Wolfson praised the novel's social diagnosis and compared its form to a polyphonic Internet chat, arguing that it reflects the electronic media culture it depicts.

One of the literary devices in the novel is the incorporation of virtual reality into reality. This device is carried out by depicting the delirium of the main character after the use of drugs. The use of fly agaric causes the protagonist's speech dysfunction, which leads the protagonist to believe that "there is no absolute truth, it depends on the observer and witness of events." The novel's episode of Che Guevara's spirit summoning shows man's dependence on television and his transformation into a "virtual subject."

Roman Ivashkiv reads Tatarsky's adaptation of Western advertisements as a fictional examination of translation: English slogans, Russian wordplay and literary allusions blur the distinction between translating and creating an original text.
