= Victor Ginzburg (director) =

American director, producer, and screenwriter

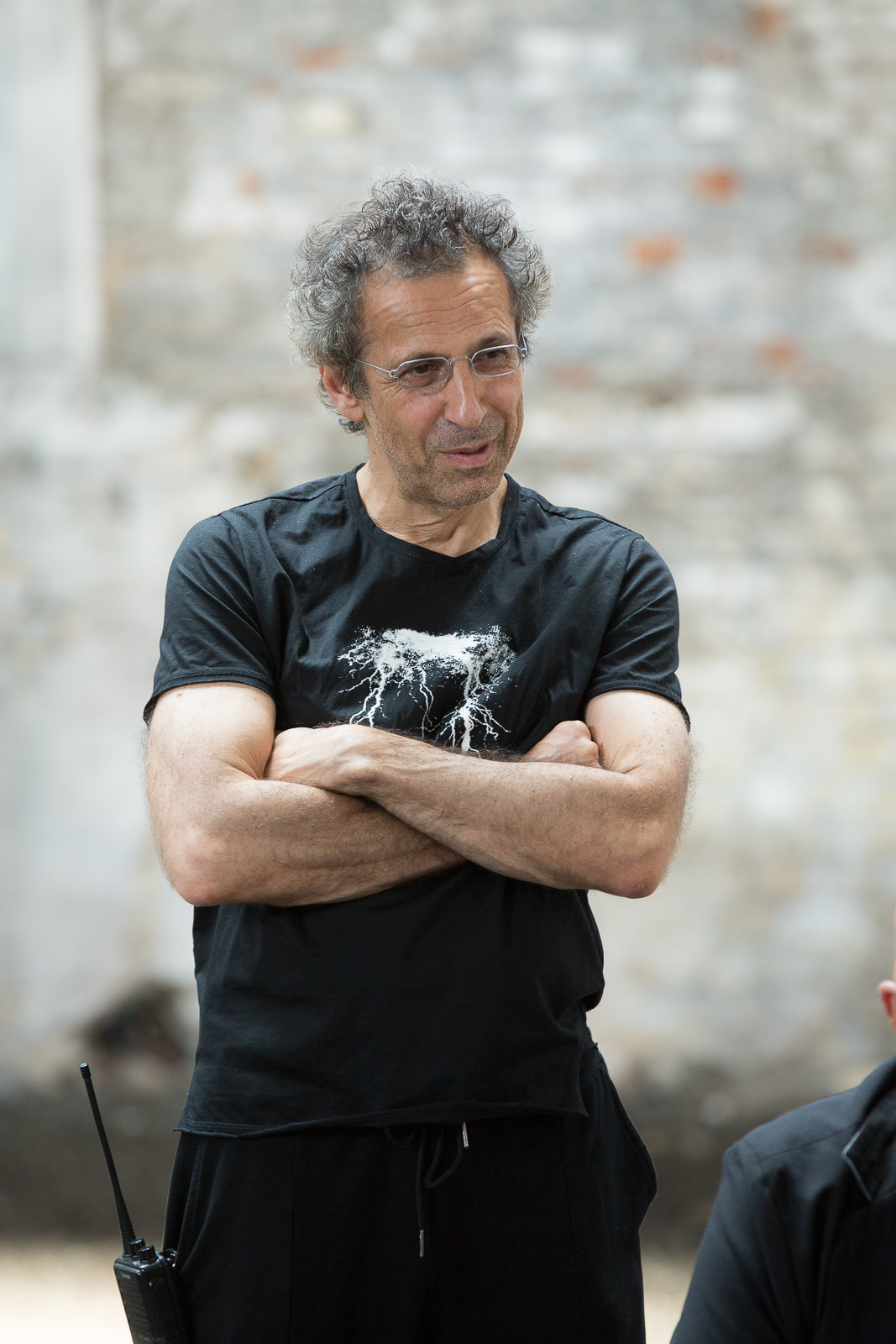
- Born: Victor Lvovich Ginzburg; 6 April 1959 (age 67); Moscow, Russian SFSR, Soviet Union
- Citizenship: United States
- Occupations: Film director, film producer, screenwriter
- Spouse: Gina Ginzburg

Victor Lvovich Ginzburg (Russian: Виктор Львович Гинзбург) is an American director, producer and screenwriter who has worked on films, commercials and music videos. He is best known for the film Generation P (2011).

== Early life ==
Victor Ginzburg was born in 1959 in Moscow, the grandson of pianist Grigory Ginzburg. At the age of 15, he emigrated to the United States with his mother. He went on to study literature at the New School of Social Research and filmmaking at the School of Visual Arts in New York.

== Film and television career ==
Ginzburg's student film Hurricane David, a short documentary about victims of cerebral palsy expressing themselves through art therapy, won the Grand Prize at the 1983 Mason Gross Film Festival in Syracuse, New York. Ginzburg next directed Alien Probe, a short film scored to the music of New Order's "Blue Monday" that led to Ginzburg's entry into the music video industry. Ginzburg followed up with several successful music videos for various artists, including Pat Benatar, Lou Reed, Belinda Carlisle, Gorky Park, Shy and Jody Watley.

Ginzburg's first feature-length documentary The Restless Garden (1993) was filmed in Moscow in 1991 and documented the cultural and sexual revolution taking place during the fall of the Soviet Union. The film premiered at the Boston International Film Festival in 1994. The film was provocative because of its eroticism and depiction of nudity and led to Ginzburg directing. Ginzburg directed several episodes for the HBO documentary television series Real Sex.

In 2006, after a ten-year period of simultaneously running a music video and commercial creative boutique “Room” and developing screenplays, Ginzburg began pre-production on a Russian language film Generation P, based on the best-selling Russian novel of the same name by Victor Pelevin. Due to its political and irreverent content, Generation P was unable to secure Russian government backing and had to be financed independently. The film, which Ginzburg co-wrote, directed and produced, took five years to complete as a result.

Generation P premiered in Russia in the spring of 2011 and proved to be both a critical and box office success, generating over $4.6 million in Russian box office receipts that summer, higher than any other domestic Russian film during the spring-summer 2011. The film also won several awards at international film festivals, including the Crystal Globe Jury Prize at the Karlovy Vary IFF, Jury “Special Mention” at the Sofia IFF and the Almaty IFF "Best Feature Film" award. It was also selected to the Vanguard Program of the Toronto IFF, and New Directors/New Films at MoMA and Lincoln Center.

In 2011 Ginzburg acquired film rights to another Victor Pelevin book “Empire V”, the unofficial sequel to Generation P.

== Critical acclaim ==
Generation P was shown at many international film festivals and had mostly positive reviews. "Director and co-writer Victor Ginzburg serves a vital cocktail that suggests a mix of 'Brazil,' David Mamet's media-spin satires, rabbit-hole tales and theme comedies such as 'How to Succeed in Advertising,' along with a dominant Russian gene that keeps things fresh and unique." Anita Katz, The San Francisco Examiner

"Director Victor Ginzburg's Generation P gives phantasmagoric treatment to an alternate (but not necessarily inaccurate) history of the Putin moment." Karina Longworth, The Village Voice

"Generation P has the energizing feel of a work by a filmmaker who has a lot he wants to say and is unafraid to risk clumsiness in order to fully express it. Also, Ginzburg's freewheeling visual invention merely reflects a society that seems to prize slick appearances over actual substance." Kenji Fujishima, Slant Magazine

"Director Victor Ginzburg brings a deadpan, Strangelovian ambiance to his adaptation of Victor Pelevin's cult novel, and the result is a film that irresistibly draws you into its increasingly delirious world" Dan Persons, Cinefantastique

"...One of the year's true cinematic sleepers... a cultural firebomb. Director Victor Ginzburg takes the audience on a long, strange trip through the minefield of 21st century Russia, juxtaposing elements of absurdist comedy, underground crime thriller and – in several hilariously imagined psychedelic scenes – the mysterious quests of Andrei Tarkovsky." Steve Dollar, The Wall Street Journal

For nearly two hours, Ginzburg presents a series of complex sequences. 'Generation P' depicts a journey to the media and power center of a country where the process of defining its identity is framed as an advertising campaign.

“Expatriate director Victor Ginzburg's thrilling initial feature film has been seen by more than a million of his countrymen. He exhibits a stylistic genius equal to a Gilliam or Fincher in the process." Brad Schreiber, The Huffington Post

"Generation P is a witty, wildly imaginative, intermittently psychedelic trip through the post-Soviet mindset, or at least the post-Soviet mindset of writer/director Victor Ginzburg." John Semley, Torontoist

"Generation P was honored with a Special Mention by the Grand Jury... The movie is definitely a successful adaptation of the novel...It manages, through the means of cinema, to convey this unique atmosphere, especially in the esoteric scenes where the hero seeks to find the meaning of his existence and to become part of something on "another" level" Dimitar Kabaivanov, FIPRESCI
