= Debut Prize =

Russian literary award for young writers

The Debut Prize (Russian: Дебют) — is an independent literary prize for young authors who write in Russian. It was established by Andrei Skoch with the support of the Generation International Foundation in 2000.

It was last held in 2015 and got cancelled in 2016.

== History ==
The Debut Prize was first awarded in 2000, with financial support from Andrei Skoch.

In 2003, a special nomination for the Voice of a Generation was created.

During the first five years of the award, more than 170,000 manuscripts were submitted from Russia, many European countries, former members of the Soviet Bloc, the United States, Israel, Australia and Japan. In 2007, the Young Russian World prize was created for writers living outside the Russian Federation (regardless of nationality).

In 2012, the Debut Prize winners toured the eastern USA and participated in the Festival of Russian Arts in New York.

In 2018, a project to re-establish the award was put forward, but it did not receive government support.

== Selection of the winners ==
The works had to be written in Russian and fit the nominations of the competition. There were a total of 5-7 of them, depending on the year. The permanent nominations included Large Prose, Small Prose and Poetry. It was allowed to participate in the contest regardless of the place of living, but there was a restriction on age. Initially, the author had to be no older than 25, but thanks to an innovation in 2011, the age limit was raised to 35.

Works could be nominated by the authors themselves, as well as by public organizations, mass media, and people involved with the literary process. Both published texts and manuscripts were accepted.

At the first stage, all works were submitted to expert readers. From the works selected by them, a long-list was drawn up and handed over to the jury. The composition of the jury changed completely every year. After reading the long-list, the jury formed a short-list of 3-4 works per nomination. One-week creative workshops were organized for the finalists. On the evening before the awards are announced, the jury holds a closed session to determine the winners in all categories.

The announcement of winners and presentation of awards takes place at a reception in December of each year.

All award-winning works were published in anthologies or separate books. The authors also had the opportunity to sign a publishing contract, receive cash prizes and a Bird-shaped statuette.

== The prize ==
Winners in all categories receive a Bird award and a publishing contract with the Pokolenie Foundation worth one million rubles. Works of the winners and finalists of the Debut Prize are published annually in collections and individual books. The winners in all categories receive publication fees, and those on the shortlist are provided with 20 author copies.

== Jury and chairmen ==
=== 2000 ===
- Chairman — Dmitry Lipskerov
- Jury members — Bakhyt Kenjeev, Vyacheslav Kuritsyn, Olga Slavnikova

=== 2001 ===
- Chairman — Mikhail Veller
- Jury members — Dmitry Bavilsky, Igor Irtenyev, Vera Pavlova, Aleksey Slapovsky

=== 2002 ===
- Chairman — Aleksandr Kabakov
- Jury members — Nikolay Kononov, Ilya Kukulin, Alexander Misharin, Grigoriy Oster

=== 2003 ===
- Chairman — Yevgeny Rein
- Jury members — Leonid Kostyukov, Olga Kuchkina, Yevgeni Popov, Mikhail Uspensky

=== 2004 ===
- Chairman — Chingiz Aitmatov
- Jury members — Alexander Galin, Sergey Gandlevsky, Sergey Kostyrko, Asar Eppel

=== 2005 ===
- Chairman — Evgeny Popov
- Jury members — Alexander Adabashian, Andrei Gelasimov, Yuri Kublanovsky, Valentin Nepomnyashchy, Viktor Slavkin

=== 2006 ===
- Chairman — Vladimir Makanin
- Jury members — Roman Sef, Oleg Chukhontsev, Marina Vishnevetskaya, Alla Latynina, Alexander Misharin

=== 2007 ===
- Chairman — Anatoly Pristavkin
- Jury members — Maxim Amelin, Andrey Volos, Maria Galina, Olga Kuchkina

=== 2008 ===
- Chairman — Timur Kibirov
- Jury members — Elena Gremina, Pavel Krusanov, Alexander Sekatsky, Sergey Sibirtsev

=== 2009 ===
- Chairman — Dmitry Bak
- Jury members — Irina Ermakova, Alexander Ilichevsky, Zakhar Prilepin, Mikhail Ugarov

=== 2010 ===
- Chairman — Mark Rozovsky
- Jury members — Pavel Basinsky, Sergey Kruglov, Maya Kucherskaya, Alexander Terekhov

=== 2011 ===
- Chairman — Nikolai Kolyada
- Jury members — Maria Arbatova, Andrey Astvatsaturov, Oleg Divov, Vadim Mesyats, Sergey Nikolayevich

=== 2012 ===
- Chairman — Pavel Basinsky
- Jury members — Marina Dyachenko, Oleg Zayonchkovsky, Sergey Kuznetsov, Alexey Slapovsky, Valery Shubinsky

=== 2013 ===
- Chairman — Pavel Sanayev
- Jury members — Oleg Bogayev, Dmitry Vedenyapin, Dmitry Glukhovsky, Pavel Kryuchkov, Roman Senchin

=== 2014 ===
- Chairman — Pavel Basinsky
- Jury members — Yuri Buida, Alexander Kabanov, Vladimir Novikov, Yaroslava Pulinovich

=== 2015 ===
- Chairman — Andrey Gelasimov
- Jury members — Alisa Ganieva, Evgeny Ermolin, Vladimir Gubailovsky

== Winners ==
=== 2000 ===
- Large-prose. Sergei Sakin and Pavel Teterskii, for the story Big Ben (Russian surprise for the Queen Mum).
- Small prose. Danila Davydov, for a book of short stories Experiments cruelty.
- Large-scale poetic form. Catherine Boyarskikh, for the poem Echo of Women.
- Small poetic form. Cyril Reshetnikov, for a series of poems.
- Drama. Vasily Sigarev, for the play Clay.

=== 2001 ===
- Large-prose. Sergei Shargunov, for the novel The Kid punished.
- Small prose. Denis Osokin, for a series of short stories Angels and Revolution.
- Poetry. Natalia Starodubtseva, for a series of poems.
- Drama. Svetlana Savina, for the play The violin and a little nervous.
- Humor in the literature. Anastasia Kopman, for a series of ironic miniatures.

=== 2002 ===
- Large-prose. Anatoly Ryasov, for his novel Three of hell.
- Small prose. Dean Gatina, for a cycle of miniatures Hot Countries and Attraction.
- Poetry. Paul Kolpakov, for a series of poems.
- Drama. Sergei Kaluzhanov, for the play Sooner or later.
- Literature for children. Anna Russ, for the selection of poems.

=== 2003 ===
- Large-prose. Vladimir Lorchenkov, for his novel Hora Shootout.
- Small prose. Nicholas Epihin, for the selection of stories.
- Poetry. Marianne Heiden, for a series of poems.
- Drama. Ksenia Zhukova, for the play By accident.
- Fantastic. Alexander Force, behind the story Army Gutentaka.

=== 2004 ===
- Large-prose. Alexander Grishchenko, for the story Backwards.
- Small prose. Oleg Zobern, for the selection of stories.
- Poetry. Anna Logvinova, for a cycle of poems In the bosom of the Soviet coat.
- Drama. Zlata Demina, for the play God Loves.
- Literary criticism and essays. Julia Idlis, for the selection of book reviews and essays.

=== 2005 ===
- Large-prose. Dmitry Faleev, for the novel "Cold beer on a sunny afternoon".
- Small prose. Alexander Snegirev, for a selection of stories.
- Poetry. Alla Gorbunova, for a selection of poems.
- Drama. Alexander Gritsenko, for the play "Carriers".
- The film story. Anastasia Cech, for the script "Otlichnitsa".
- Journalism. Dmitry Biryukov, for a selection of articles.
- The literature of spiritual search. Andrew Nitchenko, for a selection of poems.

=== 2006 ===
- Large-prose. Victor Tufts, for his story Diabetes.
- Small prose. Daria Tagil, for a selection of stories.
- Poetry. Marina Mursalova, for a selection of poems.
- Drama. Nicholas Sredin, for the play The stars in the sand.
- Literary criticism and essays. Valeria Pustovaya, for a collection of essays and reviews.
- Literature for Children. Vadim Celine, for the story At home on the board! How to learn to ride a skateboard.

=== 2007 ===
- Large-prose. Stanislav Burkin, for the novel On the bank of the Tom Faun.
- Small prose. Irina Glebova, for a selection of stories.
- Poetry. Vladimir Kochnev, for a selection of poems.
- Dramatic. Valery Pecheykin, for the play Falcons.
- Fantastic. Olga Onoyko, for his novel Surgery.
- Young Russian world. First Prize: Dmitry Vachedin (Mainz, Germany), for his story The Rifleman azure sky; Second prize: Valery Pecheykin (Tashkent, Uzbekistan), for the play Falcons; Third Prize: Alexander Mortgage (Odesa, Ukraine), for the play Travel.

=== 2008 ===
- Large-prose. Sergei Krasilnikov, for the novel Blood Bitch.
- Small prose. Michael Coons, for a selection of stories.
- Poetry. Andrei Egorov, for a selection of poems.
- Drama. Yaroslav Pulinovich, for the play Natasha's Dream
- Literary criticism and essays. Alexander Montlevich, for his essay Criminology Presence.
- Screenplay. Daria Gratsevich, for the script Touchy.
- Young Russian world: First Prize: Sergey Krasilnikov (Daugavpils, Latvia), for the novel Blood Bitch; Second Prize: Daniel Benditskiy (Berlin, Germany), for a compilation of short stories, and the third prize: Oksana Barysheva (Almaty, Kazakhstan), for the documentary On this and that side Ryskulov.

=== 2009 ===
- Large-prose. Gulla Hirachev (Alisa Ganieva), for her story Salam, Dalgat!.
- Small prose. Pauline Klyukina, for a selection of stories.
- Poetry. Ekaterina Sokolova, for a selection of poems.
- Drama. Anne Buchanan, for his play Frontovichka.
- Essays. Eugene Tabachnikov, for his essay Generation I.

=== 2010 ===
- Large-prose. Olga Rimsha, for the novel Still Water.
- Small prose. Anna Geraskina, for the story, I can not hear you.
- Poetry. Alex Afonin, a poem from the book Water and Time.
- Drama. Maria Zielinska, for the play Do you hear?
- Essays. Tatiana Mazepina, for an essay A Journey to the side of paradise. In Egypt, on the ground.

=== 2011 ===
- Large-prose. Vladislav Beekeeper, for the story Mode.
- Little Prose. Edward Lukoyanov, for a selection of stories.
- Poetry. Andrew Bowman, for the book Tysyacheletnik.
- Drama. Ekaterina Vasilyeva, for the play You were my, Love me greatly, One day we'll all be happy.
- Essays. Marianne Ions, for the product Residents gardens.
- Fantastic. Anna Leonidova, for the novel Before I die.

=== 2012 ===
- Large-prose. Ilia Pankratov, for the story Slonodemiya.
- Little Prose. Eugene Grandma, for a series of short stories, Winter's Tale.
- Poetry. Alexei Porvin, for a selection of poems.
- Dramatic. Xenia Stepanycheva, for the play The Rape.
- Essays. Elena Pogorelaya, for a selection of critical articles.
- Fantastic. Dmitry Kolodan, for the story and the cycle of short stories The Time Jabberwocky.
- Special film prize. Maxim Matkovsky, for a series of short stories, Dancing with the pigs.

=== 2013 ===
- Large prose. Alexei Lesnyansky for the story Otara goes to the wind.
- Small prose. Alexander Reshovsky for a collection of short stories.
- Poetry. Leta Yugai for a cycle of poems Notes of a travelling folklorist.
- Dramaturgy. Dmitry Bogoslavsky for his plays Outer Sidekicks and Girls.
- Essayism. Ekaterina Ivanova (Fedorchuk) for a selection of articles and essays.
- Fiction. Anton Botev for the story Schrödinger's Cat.

=== 2014 ===
- Large prose. Maxim Matkovsky for his novel Parrot in a Bear's Den and Pavel Tokarenko for his novel Nail.
- Small Prose. Mikhail Shanin for a selection of short stories.
- Poetry. Anastasia Afanasyeva for her book of poems Fingerprints.
- Dramaturgy. Irina Vaskovskaya for her play Galatea Sobakina.
- Essayism. Arslan Khasavov for his collection of essays Reclaiming Space.

=== 2015 ===
- Large prose. Sergey Gorshkovozov (Samsonov) for the novel Falcon Frontier.
- Small prose. Gleb Didenko for a selection of short stories.
- Poetry. Vladimir Belyaev for a selection of poems.
- Essayism. Nikolai Podosokorsky for his essay The Black Hen, or the Underground Dwellers by Antoni Pogorelsky as a story about Masonic initiation.

== Books published as a result of the Debut Prize ==
=== 2000 ===
- Anton Friedland. "The Smell of Chess". Novel, Metro. Story. - Moscow LLC "Publishing ACT" 2001. Novel "The Smell of Chess" - a stylish smart detective. The book also includes a new story by Anton Friedland "Metro".
- "Clay." Prose, drama. - Moscow LLC "Publishing ACT" 2001.
- The collection "Plasticine" includes prose and drama winners and finalists "Debut 2000". Danila Davydov, Sergei Sakin, Kira Lascaris, Oksana Ephraim, Anton Jankowski, Zalina Hadikova Sergei Kaluzhanov, Michael Pokrass, Basil cigars.
- "The density of expectations." Collection of poetry. - Moscow LLC "Publishing ACT" 2001. Poetry collection opens with two award winner: Catherine Boyarsky (nomination "Major poetic form", the poem "Echo Women") and Cyril Reshetnikov (nominated for "Small poetic form," Cycles of poems).

=== 2001 ===
- "Two of the island." Collection of prose. - Moscow: OGI, 2002. The book contains two stories: "The Kid punished" Sergei Shargunov and "Cradle of Death" Alexander Ostapenko. Sergei Shargunov for his novel was awarded the title of laureate "Debut" in "Major prose." Alexander Ostapenko entered the short-list "Debut-2001" in the same category.
- "War and Peace - 2001." Prose, drama. - Moscow: OGI, 2002. The collection includes works by the winners and finalists, "Debut-2001" in the nominations "Small prose", "Drama" and "Comedy in the literature." Denis Osokin, Arkady Babchenko, Aleksey Lukyanov, Vladimir Lorchenkov Anastasia Kopman, Alexander Silaev, Svetlana Savina, Sergei Kaluzhanov.
- "Anatomy of an angel." Collection of poetry. - Moscow: OGI, 2002. The book includes a selection of Natalia Starodubtseva, winner of the award in the category "Poetry", Jana Tokareva, Galina Zelenina, Dina Gatineau - finalists in the same category, and Anna Russ, which became a short-list of the category "Humour in literature."

=== 2002 ===
- Anatoly Ryasov. "Three of Hell." Roman. - M.: Publishing Elinina R., 2003. Author - winner of the "Debut" in 2002 in the category "Major Prose", Master of Oriental, an expert on the Middle East.
- "Childhood of the century." Prose, drama. - M.: Publishing Elinina R., 2003. The collection includes works by winners of "Debut" in 2002 in the category "Small Prose" (Dean Gatina) and "Drama" (Sergey Kaluzhanov), works of the finalists of the nominations (George Avdoshin Svetlana Est, Alexander Arkhipov, Andrew Kureichik) and fiction finalists "floating category" 2002 "Literature for Children" (Olesya Artemov, Olga Pakhomov).
- «XXI poet. Shot event. " Collected Poems. - M.: Publishing Elinina R., 2003. A collection of award winners in the category "Poetry" (Paul Kolpakov) and "Books for Children" (Anna Russo). There is also published lists of finalists in the category "Poetry" (Victor Іvanіv, Julia idlis, Natalia Klyuchareva) young poets and poems included in the "long list" award.

=== 2003 ===
- "Squaring the Circle". Story. - M.: Light head, 2004. The book includes works by the winners and finalists of the Independent Literary Award *"Debut" in 2003, working in the major genres of prose: Vladimir Lorchenkov (winner in the category "Major Prose"), Andrey Ivanov (winner of the special prize of the Ministry of Culture of the Russian Federation "voice of a generation"), Alexander Silaeva (winner in the category "Science Fiction"), Adriana Samarkandovoy.
- "Aldebaraki." Stories and plays. - M.: Light head, 2004. The collection includes the works of ten young writers - the winners and finalists of the Independent Literary Award "Debut" in 2003 in the category "Small prose", "Drama", "literary criticism and essays."
- "Brotherly cradle." Collection of poems. - M.: Light head, 2004. Poetic anthology presents the works of winners and finalists of the Independent Literary Award "Debut" in 2003 in the category "Poetry". In addition, the collection includes poems authors of "generation" debut. "

=== 2004 ===
- "The top of the iceberg." Story. - M.: Light head, 2005. The book includes works, finalists in 2004 in the category "Large prose." Story "back" winner "Debut 2005" Sasha Gryshchenko novel "Pale city" Igor Saveliev, the story "The school psychiatrist" Stanislav Benecko.
- "The Day of St. electrician." Short stories, plays and articles. - M.: Light head, 2005. The collection consists of works by the winners and finalists of the Independent Literary Award "Debut" in 2004 in the category "Small prose", "Drama", "literary criticism."
- "Insignia". Poetic anthology. - M.: Light head, 2005. The anthology includes the best works of the contestants, the finalists and winners of the Independent Award "Debut" in "Poetry" for 2004. It came together not only representatives of the different versions of the mainstream, but the authors, dropping out of the "framework expectations."

=== 2005 ===
- "Perimeter of happiness." Story. - M.: Light head, 2006. The collection opens the story laureate "Debut" in 2005 by Dmitry Faleeva "cold beer on a sunny afternoon." The book also includes the story of finalists "Debut 2005" Ilmira Bolotyan, Mary Botev Marina Koshkin.
- "Fifteen plus." Stories, plays, and essays. - M.: Light head, 2006. The collection includes works by the winners and finalists, "Debut" in 2005 in the category "Small prose", "Drama", "Journalism".
- "Changing the palette." Poetic anthology. - M.: Light head, 2006. The collection includes works by the winners and finalists, "Debut" in 2006 in the category "Poetry", "Literature of spiritual quest."
- Series "Millennium +" (books published up to "Debut" of different years)

=== 2006 ===
In late 2007, have been issued:

- "Stars in the sand." - M.: Light head, 2007. The collection includes works by the winners and finalists, "Debut" in 2007 in the category "Poetry", "Drama", "Small prose", "critic."
- "The sixth quarter." - M.: Light head, 2007. The collection includes works by the winners and finalists, "Debut" in 2007 in the category "Children's Literature."
- "Prisoners of Hope." - M.: Light head, 2007. The collection includes works by the winners and finalists, "Debut" in 2007 in the category "Large prose." (Authors - Andrew Skobelev Victor Tufts, Vladimir Danihnov).

=== Other ===
In 2007, the publishing house "ACT" in the publishing of the "Debut" was a book of some nominees for the "Debut" of different years, clearly currently declared, but not become winners:

- Julia Bakirova "Killer Advertising"
- Alexander Mortgage "Where our hearts"
- Alex Frolov, "Mother-jan"
- Andrei Simonov "Cairo International"
- Paul Costin "Runner"
- Andrew Kuzechkin "Mendeleev-rock"
