= Nekrasovsky =

Nekrasovsky (masculine), Nekrasovskaya (feminine), or Nekrasovskoye (neuter) may refer to:

- Nekrasovsky District, a district of Yaroslavl Oblast, Russia
- Nekrasovsky (inhabited locality) (Nekrasovskaya, Nekrasovskoye), several inhabited localities in Russia

== See also ==
- Nekrasov
- Nekrasovka
