= Russian Booker Prize =

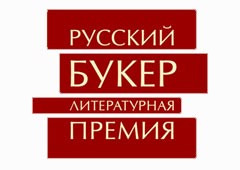
- Awarded for: Best Russian-language literary work
- Country: Russia
- Presented by: Russian Telecom Equipment Company (RTEC)
- First award: 1992
- Final award: 2017
- Website: http://www.russianbooker.org

The Russian Booker Prize (Russian: Русский Букер, Russian Booker) was a Russian literary award modeled after the Booker Prize. It was awarded from 1992 to 2017. It was inaugurated by English Chief Executive Sir Michael Harris Caine. It was awarded each year to the best work of fiction, written in the Russian language, as decided by a panel of judges, irrespective of the writer's citizenship. From 2003 to 2011 the chairman of the Russian Booker Prize Committee was British journalist George Walden. In 2012 David Gowan has been appointed to this position.

The prize was the first Russian non-governmental literary award since the country's 1917 Revolution.

Each year, a jury choose a short list of the six best novels up for nomination from a "long list" of nominees. Initially, the winner received £10,000, roughly 48,000 RUB or $16,000. This was increased to 600,000 rubles in 2011, roughly $20,000 (roughly £13,000), while each of the short listed finalists earned $2,000 (roughly £1,300). The criteria for inclusion included literary effort, representativeness of the contemporary literary genres and the author's reputation as a writer. Length was not a criterion, as books with between 40 and 60 pages had been nominated. From 1997 to 2001, the award was renamed the Smirnoff–Booker Literary Prize, in honour of entrepreneur and Smirnoff founder Pyotr Smirnov. From 2002 to 2005, Open Russia NGO was the general sponsor of the Booker Literary Prize in Russia, leading to its name change to the Booker–Open Russia Literary Prize during that time. Before the announcement of the 2005 winner, the Booker Foundation decided to end its partnership with Open Russia after the foundation's chairman, Mikhail Khodorkovsky, was sentenced to nine years in prison for tax evasion. In 2005, the committee signed a five-year contract with London-based BP. In 2010, the prize ran into funding problems and preparations for the 2010 prize were suspended because no new sponsor could be found. Since 2011 new sponsor is Russian Telecom Equipment Company (RTEC).

In 2011, a "novel of the decade" was chosen due to lack of sponsorship to hold the customary award. Five finalists were chosen from sixty nominees selected from the prize's past winners and finalists since 2001. Chudakov won posthumously with A Gloom Is Cast Upon the Ancient Steps, which takes place in a fictional town in Kazakhstan and describes life under Stalinist Russia. Lyudmila Ulitskaya holds the record for most nominations (five, winning once), followed by Andrei Dmitriev (four, winning once) and Alexey Slapovsky (four, no wins). No person has won the award more than once.

On 19 September 2019 Foundation Board and the Аward committee of the Russian Booker Prize officially announced the termination of the award. However, the Russian Booker Fund was not closed, "leaving the opportunity for the renewal of the award".

== Winners and nominees ==
=== 1990s ===
* Winners

Year	Author(s)	Work	Ref.(s)
1992	Mark Kharitonov*	Lines of Fate	
1992	Friedrich Gorenstein	Place	
1992	Aleksandr Ivanchenko	Monogram	
1992	Vladimir Makanin	Manhole	
1992	Lyudmila Petrushevskaya	The Time Night	
1992	Vladimir Sorokin	Four Stout Hearts	
1993	Vladimir Makanin*	Baize-covered Table with Decanter	
1993	Viktor Astafyev	The Cursed and the Slain	
1993	Oleg Ermakov	Sign of the Beast	
1993	Semyon Lipkin	Notes of a Lodger	
1993	Lyudmila Ulitskaya	Sonechka	
1994	Bulat Okudzhava*	The Show is Over	
1994	Peter Aleshkovsky	Skunk: A Life	
1994	Yury Buida	Don Domino	
1994	Igor Dolinyak	Third World	
1994	Mikhail Levitin	Total Indecency	
1994	Alexey Slapovsky	The First Second Coming	
1995	Georgi Vladimov*	The General and His Army	
1995	Oleg Pavlov	A Barracks Tale	
1995	Evgeny Fyodorov	The Odyssey	
1996	Andrey Sergeev*	The Stamp Album	
1996	Peter Aleshkovsky	Vladimir Chigrintsev	
1996	Viktor Astafyev	The Will to be Alive	
1996	Andrei Dmitriev	Turn in the River	
1996	Dmitrii Dobrodeev	Back to the USSR	
1996	Nina Gorlanova, Vyacheslav Bukur	A Novel About Education	
1997	Anatoly Azolsky*	Cell	
1997	Dmitri Lipskerov	The Forty Years of Changzhoeh	
1997	Yuri Maletsky	I Love	
1997	Olga Slavnikova	A Dragonfly Enlarged to the Size of a Dog	
1997	Lyudmila Ulitskaya	Medea and Her Children	
1997	Anton Utkin	Round Dance	
1998	Aleksandr Morozov*	Strange Letters	
1998	Irina Polyanskaya	Passing of the Shadow	
1998	Mikhail Prorokov	Bga	
1998	Alexey Slapovsky	Questionnaire	
1998	Alexandra Chistyakova	Не много ли для одной (English title unknown)	
1999	Mikhail Butov*	Freedom	
1999	Yury Buida	The Prussian Bride	
1999	Alexandra Vasilieva	My Marusechka	
1999	Leonid Girshovich	The Prizelist	
1999	Vladimir Makanin	The Underground, or a Hero of Our Time	
1999	Victoria Platova	A Coast	

=== 2000s ===
* Winners

Year	Author(s)	Work	Ref.(s)
2000	Mikhail Shishkin*	The Conquest of Izmail	
2000	Valery Zalotukha	The Last Communist	
2000	Nikolay Kononov	The Funeral of a Grasshopper	
2000	Marina Palei	Lunch	
2000	Alexey Slapovsky	Money Day	
2000	Svetlana Shenbrun	Roses and Chrysanthemums	
2001	Lyudmila Ulitskaya*	The Kukotsky Case	
2001	Anatoly Naiman	Sir	
2001	Sergey Nosov	The Lady of History	
2001	Tatyana Tolstaya	Slynx	
2001	Alan Cherchesov	Wreath for the Grave of the Wind	
2001	Alexander Chudakov	A Gloom Is Cast Upon the Ancient Steps	
2002	Oleg Pavlov*	Karaganda Ninth-Day Requiem or The Story of the Last Days	
2002	Dmitry Bortnikov	Fritz Syndrome	
2002	Sergei Gandlevsky	<Illegible>	
2002	Alexandr Melikhov	The Love of Kinfolks Laid to Rest	
2002	Vadim Mesyats	Treatment by Electricity: Novel of 84 Fragments from the East and 74 Fragments from the West	
2002	Vladimir Sorokin	Ice	
2003	Rubén Gallego*	White on Black	
2003	Natalia Galkina	Renaud's Residence	
2003	Leonid Zorin	Jupiter	
2003	Athanasius Mamedov	Frau Scar	
2003	Elena Chizhova	Laura	
2003	Leonid Yuzefovich	Kazaroza	
2004	Vasily Aksyonov*	Voltairiens and Voltairiennes	
2004	Oleg Zaionchkovsky	Sergeyev and the Town	
2004	Anatoly Kurchatkin	The Sun was Shining	
2004	Marta Petrova	Shilkloper's Horn	
2004	Lyudmila Petrushevskaya	Number One or in the Gardens of other Opportunities	
2004	Alexey Slapovsky	Quality of Life	
2005	Denis Gutsko*	Without Way or Track	
2005	Boris Evseev	Little Romance	
2005	Oleg Yermakov	Canvas	
2005	Anatoly Naiman	Kablukov	
2005	Roman Solntsev	Bonanza	
2005	Roman Solntsev	Except for Lavrikov	
2005	Elena Chizhova	A Criminal	
2006	Olga Slavnikova*	2017	
2006	Zakhar Prilepin	Sanka	
2006	Dina Rubina	On the Sunny Side of the Street	
2006	Denis Sobolev	Jerusalem	
2006	Alan Cherchesov	Villa Belle Letra	
2006	Peter Aleshkovsky	A Fish	
2007	Aleksandr Ilichevsky*	Matisse	
2007	Andrei Dmitriev	Bay of Joy	
2007	Yuri Malecki	The End of a Needle	
2007	Igor Sakhnovsky	The Man Who Knew Everything	
2007	Aleks Tarn	God Does Not Play With Dice	
2007	Lyudmila Ulitskaya	Daniel Stein, Translator	
2008	Mikhail Elizarov*	Librarian	
2008	Vladimir Sharov	Be as Little Children	
2008	Ilya Boyashov	Armada	
2008	Elena Nekrasova	Schukinsk and Other Places	
2008	Galina Shchekina	Grafomanka	
2008	German Sadulaev	Crack	
2009	Elena Chizhova*	The Time of Women	
2009	Roman Senchin	Eltyshevy	
2009	Alexander Terekhov	Stone Bridge	
2009	Boris Khazanov	Yesterday's Eternity	
2009	Yelena Katishonok	Once Upon a Time an Old Man and Old Woman	
2009	Leonid Yuzefovich	Cranes and Dwarfs	

=== 2010s ===
* Winners

Year	Author(s)	Work	Ref.(s)
2010	Elena Kolyadina*	The Flower Cross	
2010	Oleg Zaionchkovsky	Happiness is Possible	
2010	Andrei Ivanov	A Journey of Hanuman on Lolland	
2010	Mariam Petrosyan	The House, In Which...	
2010	German Sadulaev	Shali Raid	
2010	Margarita Khemlin	Klotsvog	
2011	Alexander Chudakov*	A Gloom Is Cast Upon the Ancient Steps	
2011	Oleg Pavlov	Karaganda Ninth-Day Requiem or The Story of the Last Days	
2011	Zakhar Prilepin	Sanka	
2011	Roman Senchin	Eltyshevy	
2011	Lyudmila Ulitskaya	Daniel Stein, Translator	
2012	Andrei Dmitriev*	The Peasant and the Teenager	
2012	Marina Akhmedova	Khadija, Notes of a Death Girl	
2012	Yevgeni Popov	Arbeit, Or A Wide Canvas	
2012	Olga Slavnikova	Light Head	
2012	Marina Stepanova	The Women of Lazarus	
2012	Alexandr Terekhov	The Germans	
2013	Andrei Volos	Возвращение в Панджруд ("Return to Panjrud")	
2014	Vladimir Sharov	Возвращение в Египет ("Return to Egypt")	
2015	Alexander Snegirev	Vera	
2015	Alisa Ganieva	Bride and Groom	
2015	Vladimir Danikhnov	The Lullaby	
2015	Yuri Pokrovsky	Among People	
2015	Roman Senchin	Flood Zone	
2015	Guzel Yakhina	Zuleikha Opens Her Eyes	
2016	Peter Aleshkovsky	Крепость ("The Citadel")	
2017	Aleksandra Nikolaenko	Убить Бобрыкина. История одного убийства ("To Kill Bobrykin. The Story of One Killing")	

== Criticism ==
The Russian Booker was famous for unpredictable and paradoxical decisions that did not always attract the approval of Russian literary experts.

A number of writers expressed their fundamental rejection of the "Russian Booker". Already the first decision of the jury, as a result of which the award in 1992 was not received by the generally recognized favorite — the novel "The Time Night" by Lyudmila Petrushevskaya, met with almost unanimous disapproval. Vladimir Novikov (ru) in 2000, describing the very first Booker prize winner - the novel "Lines of fate, or the chest of Milashevich" by Mark Kharitonov as boring, stated: "From the very beginning, the Booker plot did not succeed, it was failed to nominate a leader through the award, which modern prose writers would passionately want to catch up and overtake. But it is precisely in this [...] the cultural function, the cultural strategy of any literary prize" Elena Fanaylova noted in 2006: "The Russian Booker does not correspond to its English parent either from a moral or from a meaningful point of view (it can be compared with the translated version of the Booker already available in Russia). The prize focuses on literature that is not interesting either on the domestic or foreign market, or, if it is a convertible author (Ulitskaya, Aksenov), it is awarded not for 'novel of the year', but 'for merits'." Yuri Polyakov in 2008 pointed out that "people receive awards not for the quality of a literary text, not for some artistic discovery, not for the ability to reach the reader, but for loyalty to a certain party, mainly experimental-liberal direction. [...] Almost all the books that were awarded with the prize, [...] did not have any serious reader's fate, [...] [these books] received the award and were immediately completely forgotten." Dmitry Bykov in 2010 noted the Booker jury's "amazing ability to choose the worst or, in any case, the least significant of six novels".

Literary critic Konstantin Trunin, describing the 2018 crisis of the award, noted: "For all the time of its existence, the prize did not justify itself, each year choosing the winner as a writer who created work that is far from understanding by Russian people of the reality surrounding him. There was a direct propaganda of Western values, not Russian ones. Or on the contrary, to the West was shown literature that was not destined to create a close resemblance to the works created in Russia during the 19th century. And it is not surprising that year after year, the Russian Booker lost its authority among the emerging awards. Being handed twenty-six times, he faced the rejection of sponsors, as a result of which it became necessary to reconsider the meaning of existence, having found the transformation required by the reader to a truly Russian humanistic value system».
