= Andrei Dmitriev =

Andrei Dmitriev or Dmitriyev is the name of

- Andrei Dmitriev (athlete) (born 1990), Russian runner in the 2009 IAAF World Cross Country Championships – Junior men's race
- Andrei Dmitriyev (football coach) (born 1965), Russian football coach
- Andrei Dmitriev (politician) (born 1979), Russian politician (National Bolshevik Party, The Other Russia) and publicist
- Andrei Dmitriev (writer) (born 1956), Russian writer
- Andrey Dmitriyeu (born 1981), Belarusian politician and social activist
