= Mark Kharitonov =

Russian novelist, poet and translator (1937–2024)

- Марк Харитонов
- Born: 31 August 1937; Zhitomir, Kiev Oblast, Ukrainian SSR, USSR
- Died: 8 January 2024 (aged 86)
- Occupations: Writer; poet; essayist; translator
- Writing career
- Genre: Postmodernism
- Notable work: Lines of Fate
- Notable awards: Russian Booker Prize (1992)

Mark Sergeyevich Kharitonov (Russian: Марк Сергеевич Харитонов, 31 August 1937 – 8 January 2024) was a Russian novelist, poet, essayist, and translator. He was awarded the first Russian Booker Prize in 1992 for his novel Lines of Fate.

== Biography ==
Kharitonov was born in Zhitomir, Ukrainian SSR, in 1937. He studied at the Moscow State Pedagogical University. He later worked as a teacher, executive secretary for a newspaper, editor for a publishing house, and a writer beginning in 1969. He also did many translations, including works by Franz Kafka, Stefan Zweig, Elias Canetti, Hermann Hesse, and Thomas Mann.

After the publication in 1976 of his work A Day in February in the magazine Novy Mir, Soviet editors refused to publish his works until 1988, when he was able to publish a collection of prose. His novel Lines of Fate, written between 1981 and 1985, brought him international recognition upon its publication in 1992. The novel was awarded the first Russian Booker Prize that year. In the novel, the narrator, a literary historian named Anton Lizavin, attempts to piece together the details of the life of a fictional Soviet writer and philosopher named Semyon Milasevich, whose works have been forgotten and neglected. He does this by examining Milasevich's writings, done on candy wrappers, the only paper available to him after the Russian Revolution of 1917, and through various archival research.

Kharitonov's works, like those of Vladimir Makanin, Viktor Pelevin and others, use a combination of realism and postmodernism. According to critic Neil Cornwell, Lines of Fate shows the influence of Thomas Mann and Hermann Hesse. Lines of Fate won the Russian Booker Prize by beating out the contributions of much better known authors like Vladimir Makanin and Lyudmila Petrushevskaya. His winning of the prize made him a recognized writer, making it easier to publish more of his works, including those he had written prior to Lines of Fate. He published a modernist novel Return from Nowhere in 1995.

Kharitonov was married to Galina Edelman with one son and two daughters. He died on 8 January 2024, at the age of 86.

== English translations ==
- Lines of Fate: A Novel, New Press, 1997. ISBN 1565843711
