= Sadulaev =

Sadulaev is a surname. Notable people with the surname include:

- Abdulrashid Sadulaev (born 1996), Russian freestyle wrestler
- German Sadulaev (born 1973), Russian writer
