= Nekrasov =

Nekrasov (Russian: Некра́сов), feminine: Nekrasova (Некра́сова), is a Russian surname sometimes transliterated as Nekrassov/Nekrassova. Notable people with the surname include:

- Aleksandr Nekrasov (1883–1957), Russian mathematician and academician
- Alexander Nekrasov (born 1963), Russian politician
- Andrei Nekrasov (born 1958), contemporary Russian filmmaker from St. Petersburg
- Dasha Nekrasova (born 1991), Belarusian-American actress, filmmaker and podcaster
- Denis Nekrasov (1985–2022), Russian nationalist
- Denis Nekrasov (born 1997), Russian cyclist
- Ekaterina Nekrassova, Estonian retired pair skater
- Elena Nekrasova, Russian writer, filmmaker and contemporary artist
- Ignat Nekrasov (c.1660-1737), original leader of Nekrasovites (Nekrasov Cossacks)
- Irina Nekrassova, female weightlifter from Kazakhstan.
- Marina Nekrasova, Russian-born artistic gymnast who has represented Azerbaijan
- Maxim Nekrasov (born 2000), Russian ice dancer
- Mikhail Nekrasov (born 1980), Russian football player and coach
- Nikita Nekrasov (born 1973), Russian-French theoretical and mathematical physicist
- Nikolai Nekrasov (disambiguation), multiple persons
- Pavel Nekrasov (1853–1924), Russian mathematician
- Sergei Nekrasov (1973–2026), Russian footballer
- Viktor Nekrasov (1911–1987), Soviet writer
- Daria "Dasha" Nekrasova (born 1991), Russian-American actress
- Elena Nekrasova (born 1964), Ukrainian writer and filmmaker
- Irina Nekrassova (born 1988), Kazakhstani weightlifter
- Jekaterina Nekrassova (born 1981), Estonian figure skater
- Marina Nekrasova (born 1995), Russian born artistic gymnast representing Azerbaijan
- Yana Nekrasova, Russian curler
- Yisroel Nekrasov (born 1970), Russian translator from Yiddish

== Fictional characters ==
- Nikita Nekrassov from Nekrassov, 1955 satirical drama by Jean-Paul Sartre

== See also ==
- 2907 Nekrasov, an asteroid
