= Elena Chizhova =

Russian translator and writer

- Елена Чижова
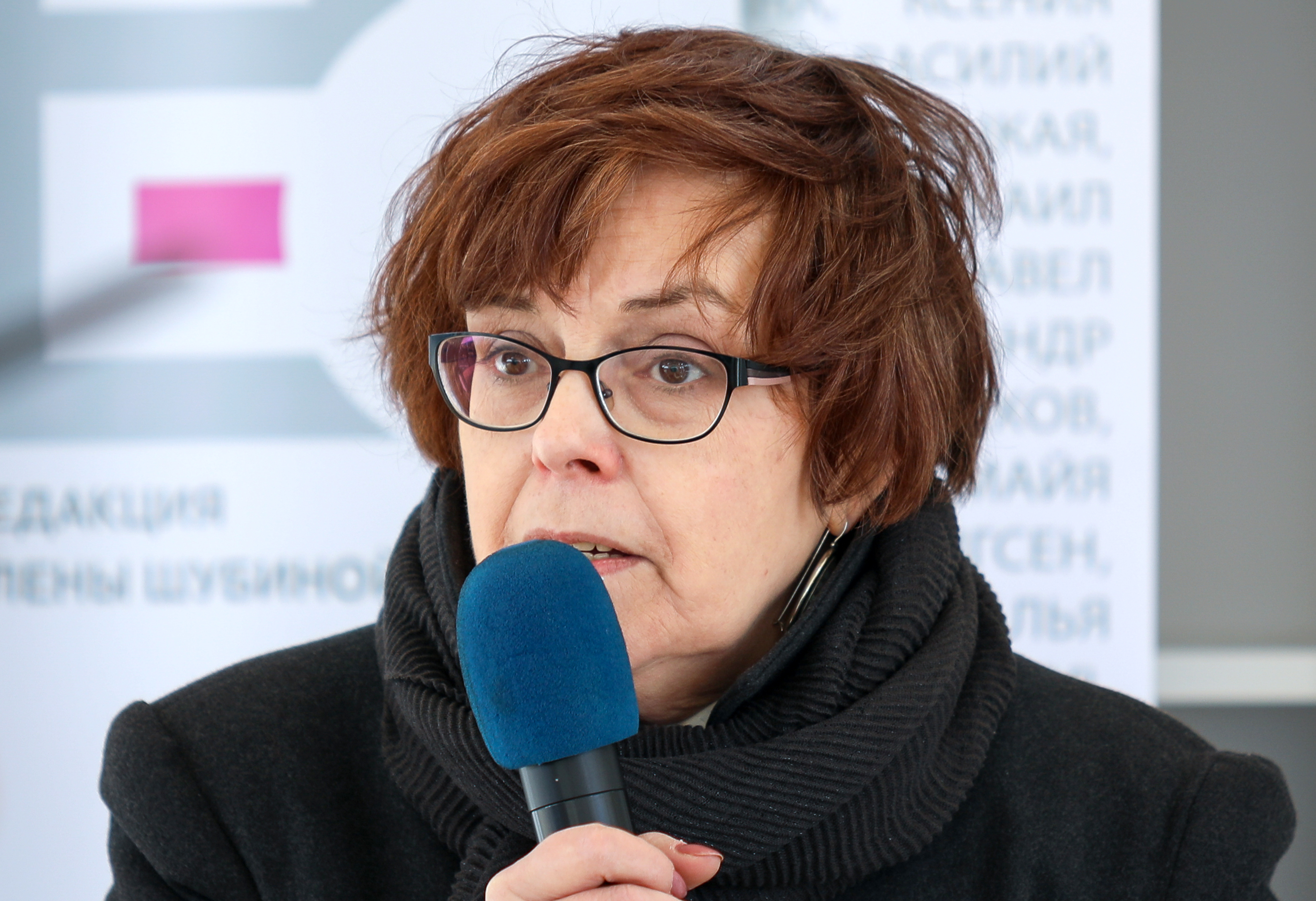
- Elena Chizhova at a book festival in 2017.
- Born: 1957 (age 68–69); Leningrad, Soviet Union
- Occupation: Novelist
- Writing career
- Notable work: The Time of Women
- Notable awards: Russian Booker Prize (2009)

Elena Semenovna Chizhova (Russian: Еле́на Семёновна Чижо́ва; born 1957) is a Russian writer, whose work is characterized by its reexamination of Russian history and society. She is best known for her 2009 novel Vremia zhenshchin, which won that year's Russian Booker Prize. Vremia zhenshchin was translated into English in 2012 as The Time of Women.

== Early life and career ==
Elena Chizhova was born in 1957 in Leningrad, now Saint Petersburg, Russia. Her father's side of the family was Jewish.

After finishing secondary school, Chizhova attended Herzen University in Leningrad. Having trained as an economist, she taught and worked as a researcher at an economics institute, but she had an interest in literature as well, conducing literary research and writing poetry in her spare time. Then, in the 1990s, she worked as an English teacher and entrepreneur, and as a corporate assistant at a furniture factory. But she continued to write, producing various poems and plays, as well as some works of literary criticism.

In 1996, she was rescued from a cruise ship that had caught fire off the coast of Turkey. After she spent six hours stuck in her cabin while waiting to see if she would be rescued, she decided to make a major life change and become a full-time writer. "I understood that I had done a lot in my life, but none of it was right. And when we were saved, I decided to throw it all away and sit and write," she later told the New York Times.

== Writing ==
After the cruise ship incident, Chizhova dedicated herself to writing novels and short stories. In 2000, she published her first novel, Kroshki Tsakhes, which debuted in the magazine Zvezda. It tells the story of a student's recollections of her brilliant and demanding teacher, and an offers a contemplation on the meaning of art. Her subsequent novels were both nominated for the Russian Booker Prize: Lavra ("The Monastery") in 2003 and Prestupnitsa ("The Criminal") in 2005.

Then, her 2009 novel Vremia zhenshchin won that year's Russian Booker Prize, making Chizhova one of only five female winners in the prize's history. It had not been expected to win, dismissed by one critic as "cemetery erotica." Set in Leningrad, the book centers on Russian women's efforts to quietly resist and keep the memory of loved ones alive in the post-World War II period, and it explores the legacy of the Soviet Union. The relatively short novel features multiple intertwining points of view, creating significant narrative complexity. Simon Patterson and Nina Chorda translated Vremia zhenshchin into English in 2012 as The Time of Women. The novel has also been adapted into a stage play.

Chizhova has since published several more novels, including Terrakotovaya starukha ("The Terracotta Old Woman") in 2011, Planeta gribov ("Mushroom Planet") in 2013, Kitaist ("The China Specialist") in 2017, and Povelitel' veshchei ("Master of Things") in 2022. In 2018, her debut novel Kroshki Tsakhes was released in English translation by Carol Ermakova as Little Zinnobers.

Her books are frequently set in her home city of Leningrad, although while she still resides in Saint Petersburg, she does not consider herself a "Petersburg writer." Her work often deals with questions of Russian society, history, and religion. She also describes herself as working in the tradition of Westernism in Russian literature. In addition to her fiction writing, she has worked as a literary journal editor and translator. She is the director of the PEN International center in Saint Petersburg.

In 2019, Chizhova drew controversy in Russia when she wrote an article, tied to her new family memoir Gorod, napisannyy po pamyati, arguing that Stalin shares blame with Hitler for the Siege of Leningrad. Her memoir details her family's own experience during the siege, in which almost a million civilians died, many starving to death. In equating Stalin and Hitler, arguing that Stalin failed to help the people of Leningrad due to a personal vendetta, she was accused of "rehabilitation of Nazism." The backlash came from both general readers and the Russian government, with members of the Federal Assembly launching a campaign against her, and she faced a criminal investigation into her statement.

== Personal life ==
Chizhova was married to the historian Valery Vozgrin, with whom she has two daughters, until his death in 2020.

== Selected works ==
- Kroshki Tsakhes (2000)
- Lavra (2003)
- Prestupnitsa (2005)
- Orest i syn (2007)
- Vremia zhenshchin (2009)
- Terrakotovaya starukha (2011)
- Planeta gribov (2013)
- Gorod, napisannyy po pamyati (2019)
- Povelitel' veshchei (2022)
