= Vladimir Lorchenkov =

Russian writer, translator (from French and Russian), journalist, librarian, archivist

Vladimir Lorchenkov (born 1979) is a Moldavian writer of Russian origin. He was born in Chișinău to a Soviet army officer father. His childhood took him all across the Communist world. Returning to Moldova, he studied journalism and worked for a decade as a crime reporter. He has published a dozen books, among them The Good Life Elsewhere which has been translated into English by Ross Ufberg. He has won numerous prizes for his work including the 2003 Debut Prize and the 2008 Russia Prize.

As of 2016, he lives in Montreal, Canada, where he works as a librarian and loader.
