= Oleg Yermakov =

Russian writer

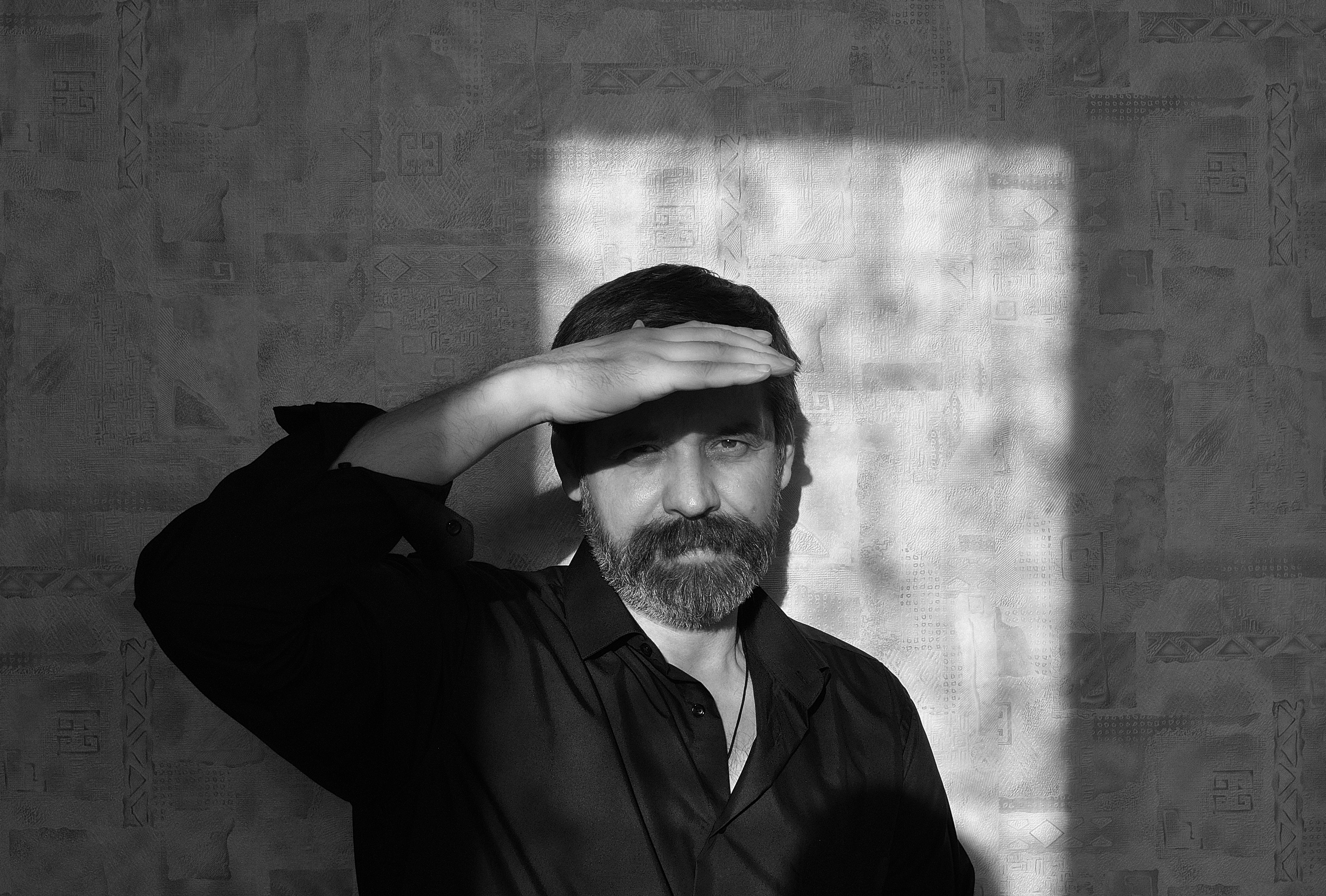
Oleg Yermakov

Oleg Yermakov is a Russian writer. He was born in Smolensk in 1961, and worked in a forest reserve near Lake Baikal before doing his military service during the war in Afghanistan. His experiences formed the basis of an acclaimed collection of short stories, titled Afghan Stories (1991). He followed up with a novel, The Mark of the Beast (1994) which was nominated for the Russian Booker Prize. His war writing has been compared to that of Tolstoy and the literature of the Vietnam War.

Ermakov's work is heavily engaged with the question of place as evidenced by books such as Rainbow and Heather, a 2018 Big Book Award finalist, set in Smolensk, and The Tungus’s Song, a 2017 Yasnaya Polyana Award finalist, set in Siberia. Other places important in his work are the Altai, Baikal, and Barguzin areas as well as Afghanistan. The 2012 collection of stories, The Arithmetic of War, returns to this theme in his work. Ermakov has stated his admiration for other Afgantsy writers such as Igor Frolov and Igor Afanasyev.

His work has been translated into English and French, among other languages.

== Works ==
- Libgerik, novel, 2019
- The Anarchist's Book of the Dove, novel, 2018
- Rainbow and Heather – finalist, Big Book Award, 2018
- The Tungus's Song – winner of reader prize, finalist for jury prize, Yasnaya Polyana Award, 2017
- Canvas – finalist, Russian Booker Prize, 2005
- Sign of the Beast – finalist, Russian Booker Prize, 1993
- The Arithmetic of War, short fiction collection, 2012
- Afghan Tales: Stories from Russia's Vietnam, translated by Marc Romano; William Morrow & Company, 1993

== See also ==
- List of Heroes of the Russian Federation
