= Yuri Pokrovsky =

Russian writer (born 1954)

Yuri Nikolaevich Pokrovsky is a Russian writer. He was born in 1954 in Vienna, to a family of translators. Soon after his birth, his parents moved to the city of Gorky (today known as Nizhni Novgorod). He studied economics at the local university and continues to live in the city of his birth to this day.

A publicist in his early career, Pokrovsky began writing in the 1990s. He was instrumental in the publication of the "Noble Almanac" (Дворянского альманаха) and the book series "Русское". From 2009, he was involved with the online magazine "Zdravnitsa" and from 2011, with the organization RNL, dedicated to Russian heritage and history.

Pokrovsky came to wider prominence for his novel "Among People" which was nominated for the 2015 Russian Booker Prize. The novel was set in a provincial town in Russia in the 1970s.

He teaches economics at the Nizhny Novgorod Institute of Management. He is married, with two children, and three grandchildren.

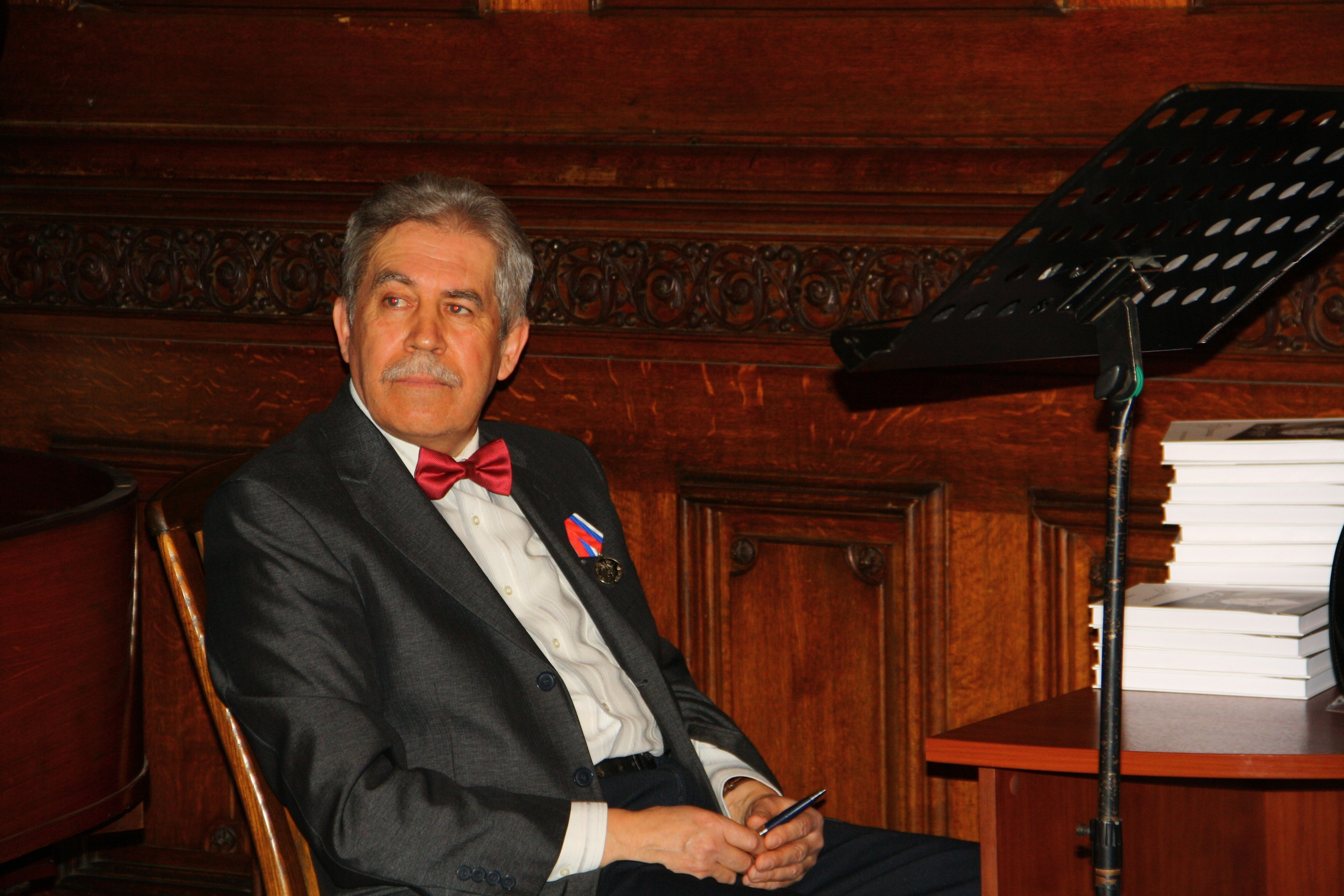
Yurik Pokrovsky at 2019 book signing of his book "Russian."
