= Andrey Sergeev =

Andrey Sergeev (Russian: Андре́й Я́ковлевич Серге́ев; 3 June 1933 in Moscow – 27 November 1998 in Moscow) was a Russian writer and translator. His book The Stamp Album was awarded the Russian Booker Prize in 1996.

== Biography ==
Andrey Sergeev was known for his translations of English poetry, in particular, of the works by T.S. Eliot, W.H. Auden, and Robert Frost. In the 1950s, he belonged to the literary group centered on Leonid Chertkov, the so-called Chertkov group. However, Sergeev's own literary works appeared in print only in the 1990s. Sergeev's novel memoir The Stamp Album was awarded the Russian Booker Prize in 1996.

From the 1960s, Sergeev was in friendly relations with Joseph Brodsky, who dedicated several poems to him, including the cycle Post Aetatem Nostram.

Sergeev died after being hit by a jeep in 1998.

== Publications in English ==
- Sergeev, Andreĭ (2002). Stamp album: a collection of people, things, relationships and words. Glas. ISBN 9785717200592.
