= Russophone (novel) =

2005 novel by Denis Gutsko

- Original title: Русскоговорящий
- Language: Russian
- Publication date: 2005
- Publication place: Russia

Russophone (Russian: Русскоговорящий, Russkogovoryashchy) is a novel by the Russian writer Denis Gutsko (Moscow, Vagrius, 2005, ISBN 5-98264-009-3). The novel is an expanded and reworked version of his novel Without Track or Trace, Без пути-следа (Bez puti-sleda also translated as Without a Way) published in Druzhba Narodov magazine (2004 nn. 11, 12). It was awarded the 2005 Russian Booker Prize (under the latter title), despite a vocal opposition by the chairman of the jury, Vasily Aksyonov. It was also awarded the Boris Sokolov Prize ("Соколов-приз", 2005).

The novel addresses the issue of Russophone people, who after the dissolution of the Soviet Union suddenly found themselves without a homeland, in new post-Soviet states, surrounded by ethnic hatred towards Russians. The plot is about the fate of a Russian born in Tbilisi, Georgia, who speaks Russian with a Georgian accent. The journal version mainly dealt with the tribulations of the main hero, who could not get a passport of the Russian citizenship. The book version was significantly expanded: the first part was added with the pre-history of the hero, involving his participation in the Armenia-Azerbaijan conflict (first Nagorno-Karabakh War). The second part was reworked to address criticism of the journal version.
