= Vladimir Danikhnov =

Russian writer

Vladimir Borisovich Danikhnov (Russian: Владимир Борисович Данихнов; 20 April 1981 – 17 September 2018) was a Russian writer. He was best known as a writer of science fiction, and his book Lullaby was a finalist for the Russian Booker Prize. A native of Rostov Oblast, he died in Saint Petersburg in September 2018 after a prolonged battle with cancer. He was the father of two children.
