= Marina Palei =

Russian-Dutch writer and poet

Marina Paley
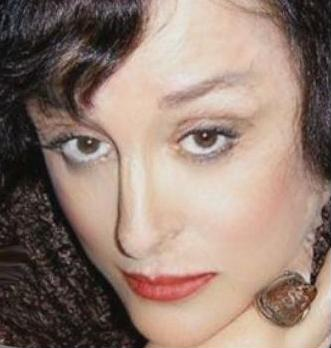
- Marina Paley in St-Petersburg
- Born: Marina Anatolyevna Spivak; 1 February 1955 (age 71); St. Petersburg, Russian SSR, Soviet Union
- Occupations: Writer, poet and scriptwriter
- Writing career
- Notable works: "Evgesha and Annushka" "Cabiria of the Obvodnyi Channel" "The Lunch" "Klemens" "Raya & Aad" "A Tribute to Salamander" "Choir" "The Farm"

Marina Anatolyevna Paley (née Spivak, also spelled Palei; in Russian: Мари́на Анато́льевна Пале́й; born 1 February 1955 in Leningrad) is a Russian-speaking Dutch writer, poet, and scriptwriter.

== Life and work ==
Marina Paley was born in Leningrad to twenty-year-old Jewish parents who had met in amateur theater group in Western Ukraine (the mother of Marina was originally from Leningrad) and come to Leningrad in order to study engineering. While they studied Marina was brought up by her maternal grandparents in a small town near Leningrad, Vsevolozhsk. Marina's early childhood, spent in nature, gave the powerful impetus to her lyrical creativity. Marina attended Primary School in Leningrad.

After her parents divorced, in her teenage years, Paley followed the complicated trajectory of her mother's life: she attended schools in the number of regions of the USSR (Kazakhstan, Chuvash Autonomous Republic, the Volga Region, Ukraine) and studied in many schools. The motif of homelessness and insecurity, always going to the existential generalization, also has been reflected in her works.

In 1972, Paley began studying medical profession at the Leningrad Institute of Medicine. After graduating in 1978, she worked in several temporary jobs, among them as a medical technician, cleaning woman, and model, and she participated in an amateur theater group. After suffering a nervous breakdown in 1983, Palei recovered and, starting in 1984, began to write poetry. She also began work as a night watchman, a choice typical for writers and artists of her generation, symbolizing their desire to opt out of officially sanctioned cultural institutions while allowing them state-mandated employment with long stretches of time to write.

Irina Rodnyanskaya, a family friend and editor at the literary journal Novyi mir, encouraged Paley to apply to the Maxim Gorky Literature Institute (in Russian: Литературный институт им. А. М. Горького). She was accepted, one of only five women in her class of eighty, and began writing fiction while taking classes at the institute. She gave up her night watchman job in 1987 to concentrate on writing, and her first publications were primarily literary criticism and reviews. It was during this time that Palei also became involved in the dissident movement, joining the independent Democratic Union (in Russian: Демократический союз) party in 1988.

Paley's first published fiction was a short story, "Composition on Red and Blue" (later renamed "Virage"). The story was printed in "Sobesednik" (the weekly supplement to "Komsomolskaya Pravda") in 1989. However, it was the novella "Evgesha and Annushka" ("Znamya" 1990) that made her famous. In 1991, Paley's novella, "Cabiria of the Obvodny Canal," was published in Novy Mir," bringing her instant critical acclaim and a nomination for the prestigious Russian Booker Prize. Despite harassment from the KGB for her political activities, Palei continued to publish. She graduated cum laude in 1991 and was invited to join the Writers' Union. Although Paley emigrated to the Netherlands in 1995, she has continued to publish in Russia. Her first collection, Birthplace of the Wind (Russian: Месторождение ветра), which gathered together her best-known works and previously published story cycles, was published in 1998. This collection was followed by "Long Distance, ili Slavyanskyi Akcent" ("Long Distance or the Slavic Accent") – 2000, Vagrius, "The Lunch" (2000, Inapress), "Klemens" (2007, Vremya), "Tribute to Salamander" (2012, Eksmo). In the years 2011–2013 the publishing-house Eksmo (Moscow) has published 9-volume collected works of her prose and drama.

Paley's prose has been translated into many languages, including English, German, French, Finnish, Norwegian, Swedish, Italian, Dutch, Slovak, Slovene, Estonian, Latvian, Spanish and Japanese.

Paley's many activities also include translations. She translated Italian, Dutch, Greek, English and Slovenian poetry and Flemish prose.

Marina Paley's literary achievements and her contribution to the contemporary literary process are well-known by the international community. Many literary critics and specialists in modern literature esteem her work as a progressive modern development of Russian literature traditions. Paley has been a guest of honor to many European literary festivals. Her writings are included in obligatory reading programs and seminars of several European and American Universities, and her art is a subject of multiple philological studies, essays, and dissertations.

In 1995, due to the categorical rejection of the political regime in Russia, Marina Paley emigrated to the Netherlands, where, over time, she received Dutch citizenship. She considers herself a Dutch writer of Jewish origin, writing in Russian. She is an active oppositionist in relation to the fascist regime of Russia. Since the beginning of the Russo-Ukrainian war in 2014, she has cut off all ties with Russia and switched entirely to Facebook. She is active on Youtube under the username @m343.

=== Membership in organizations ===
- Auteursbond — Dutch Union of Writers and Translators (Auteursbond)
- Netwerk scenarioschrijvers – Dutch Associations of Film and TV professionals
- Federation of Screenwriters in Europe

=== Literary awards ===
==== Shortlist ====
- "The Lunch" novel (Russian: "Ланч") – Smirnoff-Booker Prize 2000
- "The Farm" novella (Russian: "Хутор") – I.P. Belkin Prize 2005 (Novella of the Year Prize)
- "Klemens" novel – The Big Book Prize(Russian: Большая книга) 2006
- "Raya & Aad" novella (Russian: "Рая & Аад") – I.P. Belkin Prize 2009

==== Winner ====
- "Choir" novel – The Russian Award 2011
- An essay about Chekhov – Ernest Hemingway Award, «New World» (literary and artistic magazine), Canada, 2025

== Bibliography ==
=== PUBLICATIONS IN RUSSIAN LANGUAGE ===
==== Books in Russian language(prose and drama / scripts) ====
- "Ward of Lost Souls" (in other translations: "Department of the Lost"; "The Bloody Women's Ward"; "The Losers' Division")- Moskovskii Rabochii publishing house, Moscow, 1991.
- "Wind-Field" – Limbus Press publishing house, Saint-Petersburg, 1998.
- "Long Distance, or the Slavic Accent" – Vagrius publishing house, Moscow, 2000.
- "The Lunch" – Inapress publishing house, Saint-Petersburg, 2000.
- "Klemens" – Vremya publishing house, Moscow, 2007.
- "Choir" (novel), including novella "Raya and Aad" (Eksmo publishing house. The Author series, 2011).
- "Cabiria of the Obvodnyi Channel". Romance novella's and Short Stories. (Eksmo publishing house. The Author's series, 2012)
- "Tribute to Salamander". Petersburg's novel. (Eksmo publishing house. The Author series, 2012).
- "The Lunch". Novel-riot. (Eksmo publishing house. The Author series, 2012).
- "Zhora Zhirnyago". Novel-pamphlet. (Eksmo publishing house. The Author series, 2012).
- "Klemens". Novel. (Eksmo publishing house. The Author series, 2012).
- "The Book with Dedications", Novella's. (Eksmo publishing house, The Aurtor series, 2013).
- "The Day of poplar fluff", Short stories. (Eksmo publishing house, The Aurtor series, 2013).
- "The Gallery", Scripts and Plays. (Eksmo publishing house, The Aurtor series, 2014).
- "Summer cinema", a new genre: story-film. (Labbardaan/Smaragd publishing house, Rotterdam — Kiev, 2018)
- “A stray, enthusiastic homeless person...” (Proza.ru), Book of memoirs about the poets of the “Zaozernaya School” 2021
- "Aquitaine". Feature film script. Published: "New Continent" ("Novyi Kontinent") magazine (Israel - USA) 2024
- "Flowers on the Conveyor". A Collection of Short Stories from the Author's Series "Hack the Backup". LitSvet Publishing, Canada, 2025.
- “The Happy Village” (A cycle of short stories about emigration) — Novy Gilgamesh Almanac, No. 6, Berlin, 2026.

==== Poetic collections in Russian Language ====
- Poem "Dream: Arrival in St. Petersburg" — "Best Poems-2011". OGI, Moscow, 2013.
- Poem "Wound Until the End". The collection "Words Smell of Gunpowder for a Long Time". RGALI, Moscow, 2015.
- "Control Кiss to the Head" (love lyrics), in Author's series "Universal Donor". publishing "Ехclusive", Kharkiv, Ukraine, 2017
- "Ingermanland", in Author's series "Universal Donor". Publishing "Ехclusive", Kharkiv, Ukraine, 2017
- "Prison Knock" (Civil Lyrics), in Author's series "Universal Donor". Publishing "Ехclusive", Kharkiv, Ukraine, 2019
- "Young Monk" (love lyrics), in Author's series "Universal Donor". Publishing "Ехclusive", Kharkiv, Ukraine, 2019
- "Flutist" (love lyrics), in Author's series "Universal Donor". Publishing "Ехclusive", Kharkiv, Ukraine, 2021
- Poetry cycle "Orda". In the collection "Year of Poetry 2025". Oleg Fyodorov Publishing House, Kyiv, Ukraine, 2025.
- Three Essays on Chekhov — Novy Svet Magazine, No. 50, Canada, 2025.
- “Love and Music” (Poetry Cycle) — Novy Svet Magazine, No. 49, Canada, 2025.
- “The Veranda” (Poetry Cycle) — New Gilgamesh Almanac, No. 6, Berlin, Germany, 2026.
- Poetry cycle "I will return like a soldier without an overcoat..." — Novy Continent Magazine, June, USA, 2026.

==== Essays ====
- Essay "Egoism." The collection "Alphabetical Truths". Klever Media Group, Moscow, 2016.
- Three Essays on Chekhov — Novy Svet Magazine, No. 50, Canada, 2025.
- Essay “Sinister Mothers,” a cinematic review covering 70 years — Novy Svet Magazine, No. 51, Canada, 2026.
- Essay "Shukshin: Rebooting the Perspective" — Novy Svet Magazine, No. 52, Canada, 2026.

=== PUBLICATIONS ABROAD ===
==== Books ====
- "Die Cabiria vom Umleitungskanal" (Rowohlt, 1992). Germany
- "Herinnerd huis" (Pegasus, 1995). The Netherlands
- "Ringkanali Cabiria" ( Perioodika, 1995). Estonia
- "Cabiria di Pietroburgo" (Il Saggiatore, 1996). Italy
- "Rückwärtsgang der Sonne" (Droschl, 1997). Austria
- "Inmitten von fremden Ernten" (Kitab, 2010). Austria
- "Klemens" (Voland, 2011). Italy
- "Küla" (SA Kultuurileht, 2012). Estonia
- "Raja & Aad" (Douane). 2015, The Netherlands
- "Mónechka" (Automatica), 2016, Spain
- «El coro» (Automatica), 2017, Spain
- "Cinema d'estate" (trailer), 2022, Italy
- カビリア "Kaбирия" (trilogy of St. Petersburg novellas: "Pomynovenie", "Evgesha and Annushka", "Кabirия s Obvodnogo Kanala"). Japanese translation: Takayanagi Satoko (高柳 聡子), publisher Hakusuisha (白水社). Series: "Minotaurs". Tokyo, Japan. 2025.
- «Cabiria of the Obvodny Canal» (LitSvet), 2026, Canada.

==== Anthologies ====
- The anthology “Kali for Women” – a short story: The Bloody Women's Ward – Conscience Deluded, Deli, India, 1994 (in English)
- The anthology “Lives in Transit”- a short stories: Rendezvous; The Losers' Division – Ardis, US, 1995 (in English)
- Almanac "Glas" (New Russian Writing) – a short story: The Bloody Women's Ward – 3, US, UK, Russia, 1995 (in English)
- The anthology “Present Imperfect” – a fragment: Cabiria from the Bypass – Westview Press, Colorado (US ), Oxford (UK), 1996 (in English)
- The anthology "Puhu, Maria!" – a novel Cabiria Kanavanrannan – Tammi, Helsinki, 1997 (in Finnish)
- The anthology "Russian Women Writing" – a short story Skazki Andersena – Shinchosha, Tokyo, Japan, 1998 (in Japanese).
- The anthology "Poetik der Grenze": "Der Aus: -gang, weg”(Еssay) – Steirische Verlagsgesellschaft, Graz, Austria, 2003 (in German)
- The anthology “Graz von Aussen”: “Graz: Ein unterhaltsames Hologramm"(Еssay) – Droschl, Graz, Austria 2003 (in German)
- The anthology "Immerhin ein Ausweg": "Der Tag des Pappelflaums" (Erzählung) – Deutscher Taschenbuch Verlag, München, Germany, 2003 (in Russian and German)
- The anthology "Russisk samtidslitteratur": "Fra Long distance, eller slavisk aksent" (Script-Novella) – NORAHL & EFTF, Norway, 2007 (in Norwegian)
- The anthology "Halbwegs zum Himmel" (Essay) – Leykam, Graz, Austria, 2007 (in German)
- "East West", The Internet Literary Forum, «Оtto the Belgian Baron», a short story, USA, October, 2022 (in English)
- "East West", The Interbet Literary Forum, «A Suitcase Without a Handle», a short story, USA, January, 2024 (in English)
