= Nekrasovsky (inhabited locality) =

Nekrasovsky (Russian: Некрасовский; masculine), Nekrasovskaya (Некрасовская; feminine), or Nekrasovskoye (Некрасовское; neuter) is the name of several inhabited localities in Russia.

== Urban localities ==
- Nekrasovsky, Moscow Oblast, a work settlement in Dmitrovsky District of Moscow Oblast
- Nekrasovskoye, a work settlement in Nekrasovsky District of Yaroslavl Oblast

== Rural localities ==
- Nekrasovsky, Krasnodar Krai, a khutor in Kiyevsky Rural Okrug of Krymsky District of Krasnodar Krai
- Nekrasovsky, Orenburg Oblast, a settlement in Verkhnebuzuluksky Selsoviet of Totsky District of Orenburg Oblast
- Nekrasovsky, Tambov Oblast, a settlement in Nizhneshibryaysky Selsoviet of Uvarovsky District of Tambov Oblast
- Nekrasovskaya, Krasnoborsky District, Arkhangelsk Oblast, a village in Alexeyevsky Selsoviet of Krasnoborsky District of Arkhangelsk Oblast
- Nekrasovskaya, Lensky District, Arkhangelsk Oblast, a village in Lensky Selsoviet of Lensky District of Arkhangelsk Oblast
- Nekrasovskaya, Krasnodar Krai, a stanitsa in Nekrasovsky Rural Okrug of Ust-Labinsky District of Krasnodar Krai
- Nekrasovskaya, Vologda Oblast, a village in Mishutinsky Selsoviet of Vozhegodsky District of Vologda Oblast
