= Oleg Pavlov =

Russian writer (1970–2018)

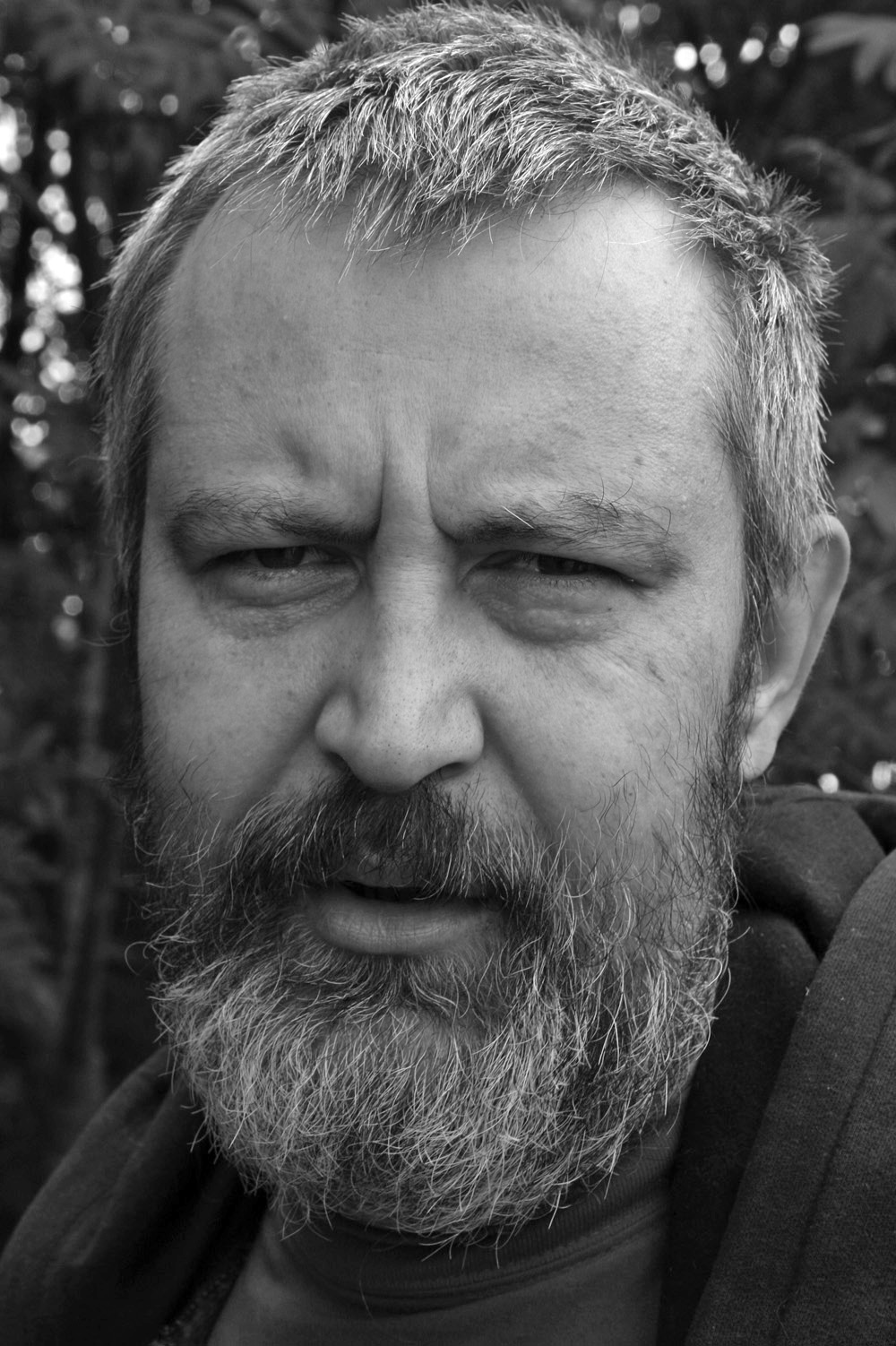
- Born: 16 March 1970; Moscow, Russian SFSR
- Died: 7 October 2018 (aged 48); Moscow, Russian Federation
- Education: Maxim Gorky Literature Institute
- Occupations: Novelist, short-story writer
- Writing career
- Notable awards: Russian Booker Prize, Solzhenitsyn Prize, Angelus Award
- Website: elkost.com/authors/pavlov

Oleg Pavlov (Russian: Олег Олегович Павлов; 16 March 1970 – 7 October 2018) was a prominent Russian writer and winner of the Russian Booker Prize.

He was only 24 years old when his first novel, Captain of the Steppe, was published, receiving praise not only from critics but from the jury of the Russian Booker Prize, which shortlisted the novel for the 1995 award. Pavlov went on to win the Prize in 2002 with his next book, The Matiushin Case (English translation published in 2014 by And Other Stories). The Matiushin Case was the second novel in what would become the thematic trilogy set in the last days of the Soviet empire: Tales from the Last Days. All three works in the trilogy are stand-alone novels.

The third book, Requiem for a Soldier, was published by And Other Stories in 2015.

== Life ==
Born in Moscow in 1970, Pavlov spent his military service as a prison guard in Kazakhstan. Many of the incidents portrayed in his fiction were inspired by his experiences there.

During his service, Pavlov suffered a head injury, was hospitalised, and spent over a month in a psychiatric ward. This allowed him to be released from the army before the end of the mandatory two-year military service. He went on to study at the Maxim Gorky Literature Institute in Moscow.

== Work ==
He was only 24 years old when his first novel, Captain of the Steppe, was published, receiving praise not only from critics but also from the jury of the Russian Booker Prize, which shortlisted the novel for the 1995 award. Pavlov went on to win the Prize in 2002 with his next book, the second novel in what would become the trilogy Tales from the Last Days.

Pavlov was also the author of articles on literature and historical and social aspects of life in Russia, as well as numerous essays. In his 2003 book "The Russian Man in the 20th Century", he wrote about Russian life, not only based on his personal experience, but also on numerous letters received from the Aleksandr Solzhenitsyn Foundation in the early 1990s, which were given to him by the famous Russian writer and dissident and his wife, Natalia.

Oleg Pavlov is said to be one of the most gifted examples of what has been dubbed the "renaissance in Russian literature."

Captain of the Steppe has been translated into English by Ian Appleby and published by independent London publisher And Other Stories in 2013. His novel Asystole, translated by Arch Tait, was published in English by Glagoslav Publications in 2015.

== Death ==
Pavlov died, in Moscow, of a heart attack on October 7, 2018

== Awards ==
- 2017 Angelus Award (Poland)
- 2012 Solzhenitsyn Prize (Russia)
- Prix du Meilleur Livre Étranger 2012
- Shortlisted for Russian National Literary Award 'Big Book' (2010)
- Znamya Literary Magazine Prize (2009)
- October Literary Magazine Prize (Best Fiction of the Year 1997, 2002)
- Russian Booker Prize (2002)
- Novy Mir Literary Magazine Prize (1995)
- Russian Booker of the Decade nominee (2011)

== Novels ==
- Captain of the Steppe (trans. Ian Appleby): And Other Stories, UK (2013). ISBN 9781908276186
- The Matiushin Case: And Other Stories, UK (2014). ISBN 9781908276360
- Requiem for a soldier (trans. Anna Gunin): And Other Stories, UK (2015) ISBN 9781908276582
