= Yelena Katishonok =

Russian-language writer

- Елена Александровна Катишонок
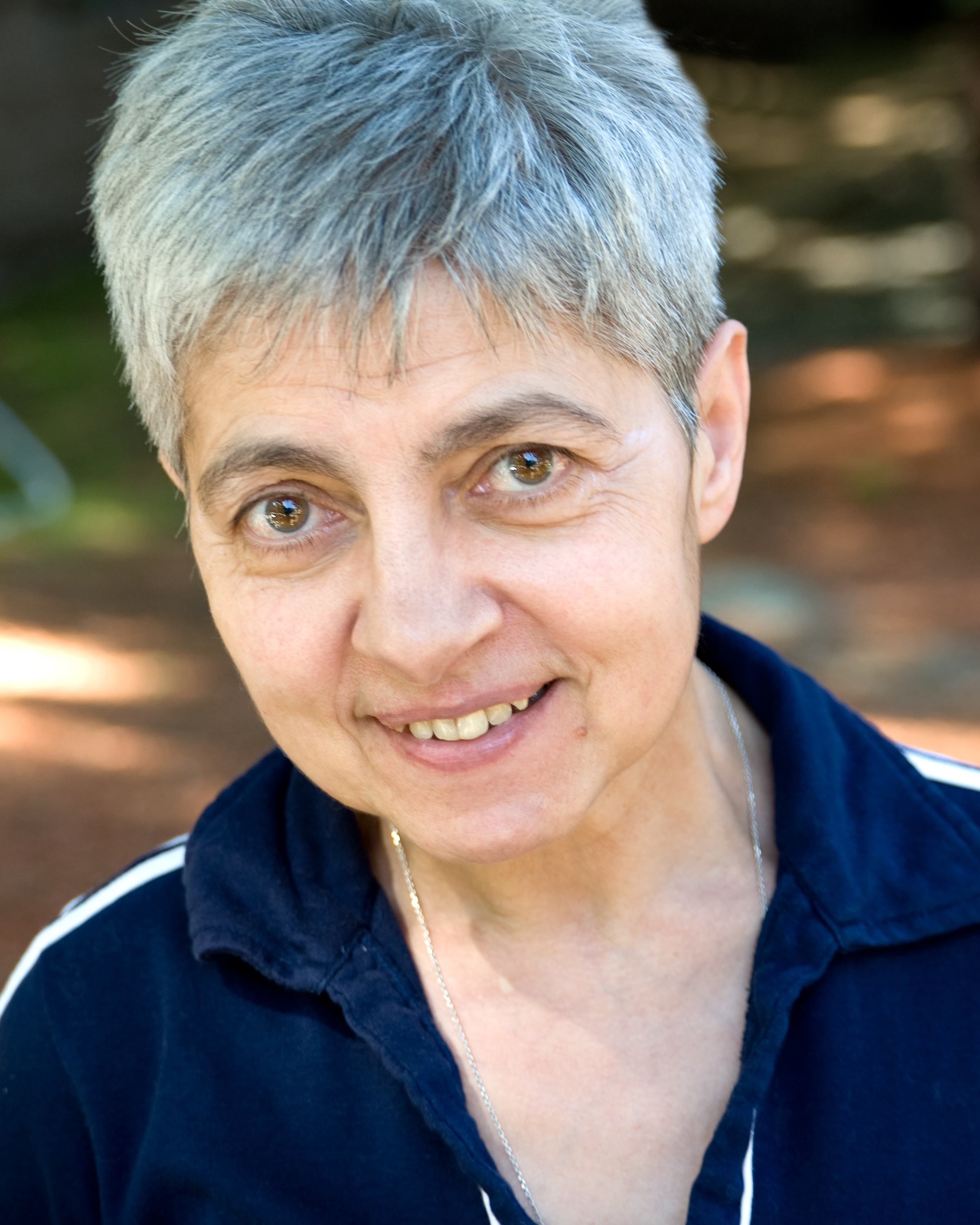
- Yelena Katishonok
- Born: Yelena Alexandrovna Katishonok; 1950 (age 75–76); Riga, Latvian SSR, Soviet Union (now Riga, Latvia)
- Citizenship: USSR→United States
- Education: Latvian University
- Occupations: poet, novelist, translator, literary editor
- Writing career
- Language: Russian
- Notable awards: Yasnaya Polyana Literary Award (2011); Russian Booker Prize (shortlist, 2009)

Yelena Alexandrovna Katishonok (Russian: Елена Александровна Катишонок, born 1950) is an American Russian-language writer and translator, author of three books of poetry, seven novels, and one book of short stories.

== Biography ==
Yelena Katishonok was born in Riga, Latvia (former Latvian SSR). She entered the philological department of Pēteris Stučka Latvian State University (now, the University of Latvia) in 1968. After graduation, she worked in various fields: teaching, editing and translation.

In 1991 emigrated to the USA. Combining teaching with translation activities, she started writing. The first poetry book The Notebook (Russian: «Блокнот») was published in 2005. Next year, in 2006, Yelena Katishonok presented her first novel in the family saga genre Once There Lived an Old Man with His Old Woman (Russian: «Жили-были старик со старухой»). First published in the US by Hermitage Publishers, it was printed in St. Petersburg, Russia by Gelikon Plus publishing house and won Gogol Prize for 2009 "for the best work in the genre of love and family novel". The same year the book was on the shortlist of the Russian Booker Prize. Soon Vremya Publishing House, Moscow released the novel and became the main publishing house of the author (more than 35 prints of 8 titles). The novel became a winner of the Yasnaya Polyana Literary Award of 2011.

The following novels Counterclockwise (Russian: «Против часовой стрелки»), As a Man Leaves (Russian: «Когда уходит человек»), and Light in a Window (Russian: «Свет в окне») continue the first one, expanding and deepening the storylines. Taken together, they are considered as a sequential cycle of the saga of Ivanovs. Each of these novels was in the long lists of Russian literary award Big Book (2010, 2011, 2015).

At the same time, Yelena Katishonok continued to write poetry. In 2008 M-Graphics Publishing House (Boston, USA) released The Pheasant Hunt (Russian: «Охота на фазана») – a collection of poems, with photographs of Eugene Palagashvili. Next year, in 2009, the new poetry book Order of Words (Russian: «Порядок слов») was published, first in Boston, later in Moscow. The book was included in a shortlist of the Bunin Prize of 2012.

The novel As a Man Leaves was translated to German (German: Das Haus in der Palissadnaja, Wien: Braumüller, 2014) and Estonian (Estonian: Kui inimene läheb ära, Tallinn: Tõlkebüroo Pangloss OÜ, 2021).

Two novels of Yelena Katishonok Jack Who Built the House (Russian: «Джек, который построил дом») (long list of Big Book 2022) and Children’s Album (Russian: «Детский альбом») have been published in 2021.

Currently, the author lives in Boston, USA. While continuing to write, she is engaged in translations of Polish poetry. In 2024 Yelena Katishonok was awarded The Hemingway Canadian Literary Award for the translations of the poetry of Wisława Szymborska from Polish into Russian.

In 2025, the bilingual edition in Polish and Russian 100+1 wiersz / 100+1 стихотворение by Wisława Szymborska, translated into Russian by Yelena Katishonok, was published in Boston, MA. Her seventh novel The Return was published as e-book by BAbooks, and in 2026 in Moscow by Vremya Publishing House

== Publications ==
- Блокнот. Стихи. — Tenafly, NJ: Hermitage Publishers, 2005. ISBN 1557791538
- Жили-были старик со старухой. Роман. — Schuylkill Haven, PA: Hermitage Publisher, 2006. ISBN 1557791597;

— Boston: M-Graphics Publishing, 2009. ISBN 978-1-934881-22-4
— СПб.: Геликон Плюс, 2009. ISBN 978-5-93682-562-0
— М.: Время, 2011–2022. ISBN 978-5-9691-0605-5, ISBN 978-5-9691-0666-6, ISBN 978-5-9691-0727-4, ISBN 978-5-9691-0800-4, ISBN 978-5-9691-1113-4, ISBN 978-5-9691-1196-7, ISBN 978-5-9691-1358-9, ISBN 978-5-9691-1509-5, ISBN 978-5-9691-1669-6, ISBN 978-5-9691-1815-7, ISBN 978-5-9691-2008-2, ISBN 978-5-9691-2137-9, ISBN 978-5-9691-2252-9

- Охота на фазана. Фотографии и стихи. (с Евгением Палагашвили) — Boston: M-Graphics Publishing, 2008. ISBN 978-1-934881-10-1
- Порядок слов. Стихи. — Boston: M-Graphics Publishing, 2009. ISBN 978-1-934881-19-4

— М.: Время, 2011. ISBN 978-5-9691-0663-5

- Против часовой стрелки. Роман. — Boston: M-Graphics Publishing, 2009. ISBN 978-1-934881-17-0

— М.: Время, 2011–2022. ISBN 978-5-9691-0590-4, ISBN 978-5-9691-0667-3, ISBN 978-5-9691-0747-2, ISBN 978-5-9691-1197-4, 2017. ISBN 978-5-9691-1541-5, ISBN 978-5-9691-1757-0, ISBN 978-5-9691-2097-6, ISBN 978-5-9691-2184-3

- Когда уходит человек. Роман. — Boston: M-Graphics Publishing, 2011. ISBN 978-1-934881-52-1

— М.: Время, 2011–2018. ISBN 978-5-9691-0665-9, ISBN 978-5-9691-0746-5, 978-5-9691-1198-1, ISBN 978-5-9691-1540-8, ISBN 978-5-9691-1816-4

- Das Haus in der Palissadnaja. Roman. (Jelena Katischonok. Aus dem Russischen von Claudia Zecher) — Wien: Braumüller, 2014. ISBN 978-3-99200-124-8
- Свет в окне. Роман. — М.: Время, 2014–2022. ISBN 978-5-9691-1244-5, ISBN 978-5-9691-1360-2, ISBN 978-5-9691-1989-5, ISBN 978-5-9691-2165-2
- Il était une fois un vieux et une vieille. (Elena Katichonok. Traduction de Marie Starynkévitch) — Paris: Lettres Russes, N°53, Novembre 2017, pp. 11–16.
- Счастливый Феликс. Рассказы и повесть. — М.: Время, 2018–2022. ISBN 978-5-9691-1716-7, ISBN 978-5-9691-1990-1, ISBN 978-5-9691-2185-0
- Детский альбом. Дневник старородящей матери Ирины Лакшиной. Роман. — М.: Время, 2021. ISBN 978-5-9691-2120-1
- Джек, который построил дом. Роман. — М.: Время, 2021. ISBN 978-5-9691-2124-9
- Kui inimene läheb ära. Romaan. (Jelena Katišonok. Tõlkinud: Mait Eelrand) — Tallinn: Tõlkebüroo Pangloss OÜ, 2021. ISBN 978-9-9164-0898-8
- 100+1 wiersz / 100+1 стихотворение by Wisława Szymborska, translated by Yelena Katishonok — Boston: M-Graphics Publishing, 2025. ISBN 978-1-9605-3368-5
- Возвращение. Роман. — BAbooks, 2025.
- Возвращение. Роман. — М.: Время, 2026. ISBN 978-5-9691-2657-2
