= Aleks Tarn =

Israeli writer (born 1955)

- Алексей Владимирович Тарновицкий
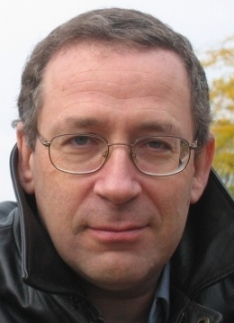
- Born: Aleksey Vladimirovich Tarnovitsky; February 20, 1955 (age 71); Arsenyev
- Citizenship: Israel
- Occupation: writer
- Writing career
- Language: Russian, Hebrew
- Genre: Contemporary prose
- Website: www.alekstarn.com

Aleksey Vladimirovich Tarnovitsky (Russian: Алексей Владимирович Тарновицкий; born 20 February 1955), better known as Aleks Tarn (Hebrew: אלכס טארן; Russian: Алекс Тарн), is a journalist and author who was born in the Russian Far East, Primorsky Krai. He grew up, studied and worked in Leningrad. Since 1989, he has lived in Beit Aryeh-Ofarim.

== Biography ==
Tarn began his literary career relatively late – in 2002. Tarn's articles on cultural and political topics were published in Russian language Israeli and American news outlets. In 2015, Aleks Tarn was awarded Yuri Stern Prize for Literature “for special contribution to society and culture”.

== Works ==
After arriving to Israel, Tarn wrote his first novel The Protocols of the Elders of Zion, a combination philosophical parable, parody, and thriller. The main protagonist is a James Bond like, semi-farcical man of action, whose activities are set in the reality of Israeli life at the time of the sharpening of the crisis in Arab-Israeli conflict. The novel was published in the 16th edition of Jerusalem Journal (Russian: Иерусалимский журнал). Tarn was awarded a prize from the "Jerusalem Journal", as an author of the most promising literary work of 2003. The novel was praised by Moscow-based literary critic Mikhail Edelstein (Russian: Эдельштейн, Михаил Юрьевич) for the author's original thinking and juxtaposition of opposites.

In the Summer of 2004, the novel was published as a separate book (publisher "Culture Bridges – Gesharim", Moscow). A second novel - Quasimodo, a novel about a dog with almost human consciousness, came out the same year. Moscow literary critic, Danila Davidov (Russian: Данила Михайлович Давыдов), reviewed the novel in the journal of "Biblio – Globus", describing it as "a rather funny story about Israeli bums, a novel gradually transforms into a parable of retribution". It received critical praise from Kira Cherkavsky (Russian: Кира Черкавская), a journalist of the radio station Echo of Moscow and from poet and a literary critic Anatoly Dobrovich (Russian: Добрович, Анатолий Борисович).

A magazine edition of Tarn's third novel Jonah was published in the 19th Jerusalem Journal, and received a generally favourable review by Leonid Gomberg (Russian: Гомберг, Леонид Ефимович), a literary critic, in the April 2005 editions of Alef magazine. In 2006, a Moscow publishing houses, "Olympus" and AST (publisher) published Tarn's trilogy about Berl, the main protagonist of which is known to the reader from the novel "The Protocols of the Elders of Zion". The three books were titled "They always come back", "G-d does not play dice" and "I will bring you back". A magazine edition of the second book of the trilogy named "Ashes" – was published in the 22nd "Jerusalem Journal".

A novel Ashes was included in the final six competitors of the Russian Booker Prize-2007.

A philosopher and a culture researcher, Dr. Dina Ratner (Russian: Дина Ратнер), dedicated to Aleks Tarn's literary works a separate chapter in her monograph Search for G-d – search for yourself.

In June 2008, the publishing house Eksmo published Tarn's satirical fantasy To steal Lenin. In the book, four friends who get together after a long break, steal Lenin's mummy from the Mausoleum. In 2012, the novel was translated into Slovak and published in Bratislava by the "Marenčin" publishing house.

The same year, Jerusalem Journal published his story "The Dome" (No.25) and a novel "The Notes of Puppeteer" (No.27).

A novel "Girshuni", written in the form of internet blogs, was included in the best ten novels of Russian speaking diaspora, according to the list from "Russian Award" (Russian: Русская премия)in 2008. The novel received critical acclaim from Moscow critic Boris Kuzminsky (Russian: Кузьминский, Борис Николаевич).

A year later the same appraisal of "Russian Award" (included in the ten best novels) was given to "Dor" – another Tarn's novel which was published in 'Jerusalem Journal'.

A story "Last Cain" became the laureate of the Mark Aldanov’s literary reward "For the best story of Russian speaking diaspora" that is given by New York's magazine New Journal" (Russian: Новый журнал)(2009).

In 2010, Moscow s publisher "Enneagon" published Tarn's novel The Book, about the Dead Sea Scrolls. This novel presents an unusual view of the beginning of Christianity. Moscow cultural scientist, Yuri Tabak (Russian: Юрий Табак) praised Tarn's "masterful craftsmanship".

In addition to his novels and journalistic articles, Aleks Tarn is also an author of several theater plays, literary scenarios as well as a poetry book "Antiblok" that was published in Israel in 1991.

Since 1989, he has been living in Israel, in the Samaria settlement of Beit Arye.

== Bibliography ==
- «Twilight of Ideologies», essay: «Jerusalem Journal» No. 14, 2003.
- «The Protocols of the Elders of Zion», novel: «Jerusalem Journal» No. 16, 2003.
- «The Protocols of the Elders of Zion», novel: «Gesharim», 2004.
- «Quasimodo», novel: «Gesharim», 2004.
- «Jonas», novel: «Jerusalem Journal» No. 19, 2005.
- «Ashes», novel: «Jerusalem Journal» No. 22-23, 2006.
- «They always come back» («Bosnian spiral»), novel: AST-«Olimp», 2006.
- «God doesn't play dice» («Ashes»), novel: «Olimp», 2006.
- «And I'll bring you back…», novel: «Olimp», 2006.
- «The city», story: «Interpoetry» journal, No. 1, 2007.
- «The story of one translation», essay: «Interpoetry» journal, No. 4, 2007.
- «Dom», novel: «Jerusalem Journal» No. 24, 2007.
- «Lonely reaper in a yellow wheat field», story: «Oktyabr» journal, No. 9, 2007.
- «To steal Lenin», novel: «Eksmo», 2008.
- «Puppeteer's notes», novel: «Jerusalem Journal» No. 27, 2008.
- «And the rocket is flying, flying…», novel: «Jerusalem Journal» No. 30, 2009.
- «Dor», novel: «Jerusalem Journal» No. 31, 2009.
- «Last Cain», novel: «Jerusalem Journal» No. 34, 2010.
- «The Book», novel: «Enneagon press», 2010.
- «Searching for the Lost Hero», novel: «Jerusalem Journal», No. 36, 2010.
- «Oblordoz», novel: SeferIsrael-Isradon, Tel-Aviv, 2019.
- «O-O», novel: «Jerusalem Journal», No. 41, 2012.
- «Chaim», novel: «Jerusalem Journal», No. 45, 2013/
- «Shall we dance, beautiful?», novel: AST, 2014.
- «Reina, Queen of Destiny», novel: «Jerusalem Journal», No. 49, 2014.
- «I'll kill whoever I want», novel: AST, 2015.
- «Killer with a propeller on a scooter», novel: AST, 2016.
- «Stories by Johanan Eichorn», «Kresthatik» journal No.1(75), 2017.
- «Small world for aliens», novel: SeferIsrael-Isradon, Tel-Aviv, 2018.
- «To the fathers' graves», novel, 2018
- «Between three worlds», essay: SeferIsrael, Tel-Aviv, 2019.
- «Knights of the era», bilingual book of translations from Hebrew (Zvi Preigerson): SeferIsrael, Tel-Aviv, 2019.
- «Sabbatical», two novels «Sabbatical» и «Orpheus and Eurydice»: SeferIsrael, Tel-Aviv, 2019.
- «Ordinary people», novel: SeferIsrael, Tel-Aviv, 2020.
- «Reina, Queen of Destiny» & «Stories by Johanan Eichorn»: SeferIsrael, Tel-Aviv, 2020;
- «Reina, Queen of Destiny», novel: "Phoenix", Ростов на-Дону, 2023
- «Sabbatical», novel, «Drujba narodov» journal No.8, М., 2020.
- «Sabbatical», novel: "Phoenix", Rostov-on-Don, 2021.
- «Sabbatical», audio-book: "Vimbo", М., 2021.
- «Paperback volume», story, «Drujba narodov» journal No.1, М., 2021.
- «We did not like Russians», novel: SeferIsrael, Tel-Aviv, 2021.
- «A girl from JFK», novel: Isradon, Tel-Aviv, 2021.
- «A girl from JFK», novel: "Phoenix", Rostov-on-Don, 2022.
- «A girl from JFK», audio-book: "Vimbo", М., 2022.
- «Coincidence», story, «Drujba narodov» journal No.5, М., 2022.
- «Four sheep by the stream», novel, «Zvezda» journal No.4, СПб., 2022.
- «Four sheep by the stream», novel: Isradon, Tel-Aviv, 2022.
- «Stepson on the run», novel: Isradon, Tel-Aviv, 2022.
- «A girl named Yohanan Galt», novel: Isradon, Tel-Aviv, 2022.
- «Last Cain», play: "Secret trails", No.3, 2023.
- «A ring of life», novel: Isradon, Tel-Aviv, 2023.
- «Numbers», story: «Zvezda» journal No.9, 2023.
- «Girshuni», novel: «Secret trails» No.5, 2023.
- «Two, six, ace», novel, 2023.
- «Last song before the Flood», novel & stories: "RUGRAM-Flauberium", М., 2023.
- «Four sheep by the stream», novel: Azbooka-Atticus, M., 2024.
- «Yellow color of black», novel, 2024.

== See also ==
- Russian Booker Prize
