= Igor Dolinyak =

Russian writer

Igor Vasilievich Dolinyak (Russian Cyrillic: игорь васильевич долиняк; 1935/36–?) was a Russian writer. He was born in Leningrad (now St Petersburg) and trained as an engineer. He wrote both poetry and prose; his book of poetry Trust in Me (Поверь в меня) was published by Lenizdat in 1968. After the breakup of the USSR, the St Petersburg-based literary journal Zvezda published his story "Nakladka". In 1994, his novel Mir Tretii (The Third World) came out and was nominated for the Russian Booker Prize.
