= Igor Afanasyev =

Russian writer and veteran of the Afghan war

- Born: Igor Mixailovich Afansyev; 1962 (age 63–64); Pskov
- Occupation: Writer

Igor Mixailovich Afanasyev is a Russian writer and veteran of the Afghan war. He was born in Pskov in 1962. He served in the Afghan war from 1983 to 1985, as a sapper in the eastern province of Ghazni. Afanasyev initially posted about his experiences of the war on the internet; this led to several books that have been acclaimed in his native Russia. Among these are:

- Сапёр, который ошибся
- Солянка по-афгански

His work has been praised by Oleg Ermakov, another Afghan veteran-turned-writer.
