= Aleksandra Nikolaenko =

Russian writer and artist (born 1976)

- Born: 1976 (age 49–50); Moscow, Russia
- Occupations: Illustrator and writer
- Website: primipilus.wixsite.com/illustration

Aleksandra Nikolaenko (Александра Николаенко Николаенко, born 1976) is a Russian writer and artist, the winner 2017 Russian Booker prize.

== Biography ==
Aleksandra Vadimovna Nikolaenko was born in Moscow in 1976. Her father works in the Kurchatov Institute, he has a PhD in science. Her mother is an artist. Nikolaenko graduated from Stroganov Moscow State Academy of Arts and Industry. Nikolaenko was first known as an artist and illustrator. She has been a member of the Moscow Union of Artists since 2002, one of their youngest members. Nikolayenko's works are presented in private collections in France, Great Britain and Russia. She has illustrated works by such people as Pavel Sanaev, Irina Vitkovskaya and Irina Goryunova as well as her own works.

Nikolaenko was the 2017 winner of the Russian Booker Prize. Her debut novel was also nominated for the National Bestseller awards as was her 2018 novel.

== Bibliography ==
- Kill Bobrykin. The Story of a Murder, (2016)
- The Leg of Fate, Pawns and the Marseillaise Dog, (2016)
- Heavenly Postman, Fedya Bulkin, (2018)
- Traffic Lights, Raggers and Other Citizens, (2017)
