= Andrei Dmitriev (writer) =

Russian novelist and short story writer

Andrei Viktorovich Dmitriev (Russian: Андре́й Ви́кторович Дми́триев; born 7 May 1956) is a Russian novelist and short story writer. He was awarded the 2012 Russian Booker Prize for his novel The Peasant and the Teenager.

== Biography ==
Dmitriev was born in Leningrad in 1956. His first short stories were published in the 1980s. He first became known in Russian literary circles for his novellas Voskoboev and Elizaveta (1992) and The Turn of the River (1995). He studied literature at Moscow State University withdrawing in 1977 to enroll in the Gerasimov Institute of Cinematography, graduating in 1982. His works have been published in the Russian journals Znamya, Novy Mir, and Druzhba Narodov. Dmitriev also writes filmscripts. His novel The Peasant and the Teenager was awarded the 2012 Russian Booker Prize.
