= Olga Slavnikova =

Russian novelist and literary critic (born 1957)

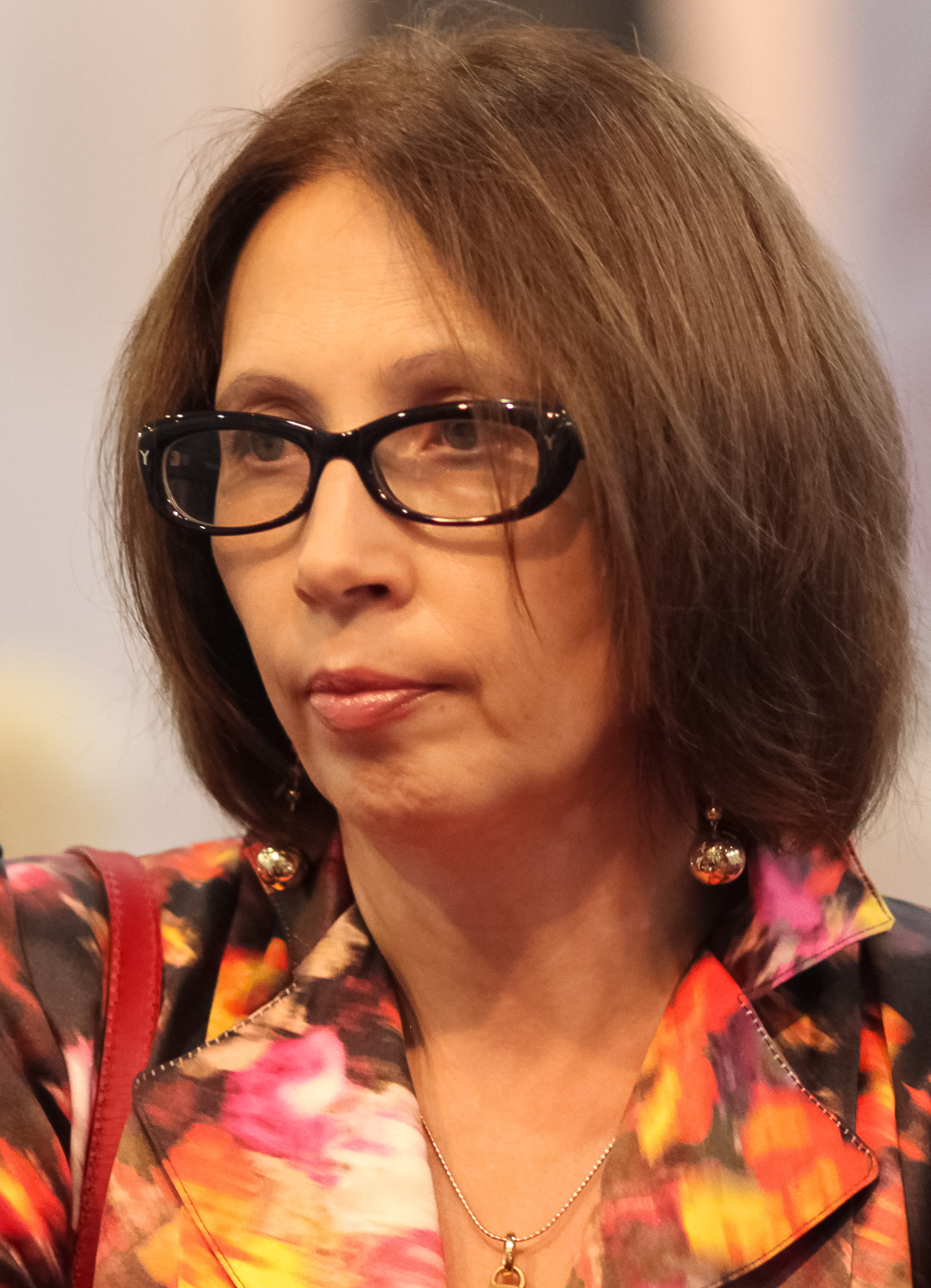
- Olga Slavnikova, 2011
- Born: October 23, 1957 (age 68); Yekaterinburg, Russia
- Occupations: writer, literary critic
- Writing career
- Notable work: 2017
- Notable awards: Russian Booker Prize (2006)

Olga Alexandrovna Slavnikova (Russian: О́льга Алекса́ндровна Сла́вникова; born 23 October 1957) is a Russian novelist and literary critic. She was awarded the 2006 Russian Booker Prize for her novel 2017.

== Biography ==
Olga Slavnikova was born and grew up in Yekaterinburg. She graduated from the Faculty of Journalism at the Ural State University in 1981. Her first works of fiction were published in the late 1980s. She has lived and worked in Moscow since 2001.

She began publishing novels in the 1990s, several of which won awards, including the Apollon Grigoriev Prize, the Polonsky Prize, and the Bazhov Prize. She was awarded the 2006 Russian Booker Prize for her novel 2017. Her latest novel Light-headed was published in 2010.

She also writes about contemporary literature and serves as director of the Debut Independent Literary Prize, which receives up to 50,000 entries per year. The prize was founded by the private organization Pokolenie to help young Russian authors get their works published in Russia and in translations worldwide. Olga has been the director of the Debut Prize since 2001.

== Works ==
Title	Year	Genre
The Freshman	1988	Novel
A Dragonfly Enlarged to the Size of a Dog	1996	Novel
Alone in the Mirror	1999	Novel
The Immortal	2001	Novel
2017	2006	Novel
Love in Carriage Seven	2009	Novel
Light-headed	2010	Novel

== English translations ==
- 2017: A Novel, Overlook, 2010. ISBN 1590203097. Translated by Marian Schwartz.
- Light-headed, Dedalus, 2015. ISBN 9781910213346. Translated by Andrew Bromfield.
- The man who couldn't die : the tale of an authentic human being, Columbia University Press, 2019 (The Russian Library). ISBN 9780231185943. Translated by Marian Schwartz.
