= Andrei Dmitriyev (football manager) =

Russian football coach

Personal information
- Full name: Andrei Pavlovich Dmitriyev
- Date of birth: 6 August 1965 (age 61)
- Place of birth: Omsk, Russian SFSR

Managerial career
- Years: Team
- 1988–1991: FC Geolog Tyumen (assistant)
- 1992–1996: OGIFK
- 2001: FC Spartak-Orekhovo (assistant)
- 2003: FC Spartak Moscow (conditioning)
- 2004: FC Spartak Moscow (reserves assistant)
- 2011–2012: PFC Spartak Nalchik (assistant)
- 2012–2013: PFC Spartak Nalchik (conditioning)
- 2013–2014: FC Metalurh Donetsk (assistant)
- 2014–2015: FC Anzhi Makhachkala (assistant)
- 2015–2016: FC Lokomotiv Moscow (assistant)
- 2017: FC Arsenal Tula (conditioning)
- 2017–2019: FC Baltika Kaliningrad (assistant)
- 2019–2020: FC Avangard Kursk (assistant)
- 2020–2021: FC Chertanovo Moscow (assistant)
- 2021–2022: FC Olimp-Dolgoprudny (assistant)
- 2022: FC Shakhtyor Soligorsk (assistant)
- 2022–2023: FC Akhmat Grozny (assistant)

Andrei Pavlovich Dmitriyev (Russian: Андрей Павлович Дмитриев; born 6 August 1965) is a Russian football coach.
