= Nekrasovka =

Nekrasovka may refer to:

- Nekrasovka District, a district of South-Eastern Administrative Okrug of Moscow, Russia
- Nekrasovka, Republic of Tatarstan, a settlement in the Republic of Tatarstan, Russia
- Nekrasovka, name of several other rural localities in Russia
- Nekrasovka (Moscow Metro), a station on the Moscow Metro.
