= Nekrasovskaya, Vologda Oblast =

Nekrasovskaya Некрасовская
- Village
- Location within Vologda Oblast Location within Russia
- Coordinates: 60°31′N 41°07′E
- Country: Russia
- Region: Vologda Oblast
- District: Vozhegodsky District
- Time zone: UTC+3:00

Nekrasovskaya (Russian: Некрасовская) is a rural locality (a village) in Mishutinskoye Rural Settlement, Vozhegodsky District, Vologda Oblast, Russia. The population was 51 as of 2002.

== Geography ==
Nekrasovskaya is located 60 km east of Vozhega (the district's administrative centre) by road. Lukyanovskaya is the nearest rural locality.
