= Oleg Zayonchkovsky =

Russian author (born 1959)

- Born: Oleg Viktorovich Zayonchkovsky; 1959 (age 66–67); Samara, Russia
- Occupation: Author

Oleg Viktorovich Zayonchkovsky (Russian: Олег Викторович Зайончковский)(born 1959) is a Russian author.

His writing has been shortlisted for the Russian Booker Prize and the National Bestseller Prize. He is the author of Sergeev and the Town (2005) and Happiness is Possible (And Other Stories, 2012), among others.

== Life ==
Oleg Zayonchkovsky was born in 1959 in Kuybyshev (now Samara), on the east bank of the Volga River. He spent all his adult life, until a recent move to Moscow, in the small town of Khotkovo, working as a test engineer in a factory making rocket engines.

== Work ==
Zayonchkovsky's first book, Sergeev and the Town (2004), was shortlisted for both the Russian Booker Prize and the National Bestseller Prize. His book Happiness is Possible (2010) was also shortlisted for the Russian Booker Prize as well as the Russian Big Book Prize.

== Bibliography ==
- «Сергеев и городок» (Sergeev and the town), 2004.
- «Петрович» (Petrovich), 2005.
- «Прогулки в парке» (Walks in the park), 2006 (stories).
- «Счастье возможно: роман нашего времени» (Happiness is possible: A novel of our time), 2009; trans. Andrew Bromfield as Happiness is Possible . London: And Other Stories, 2012. ISBN 9781908276094
- «Загул» (Spree), 2011.
- «Кто погасил свет?» (Who put out the light?), 2012 (stories).
- «Тимошина проза» (Timoshin’s prose), 2016.
