= Mikhail Veller =

Russian writer (Born: 1948)

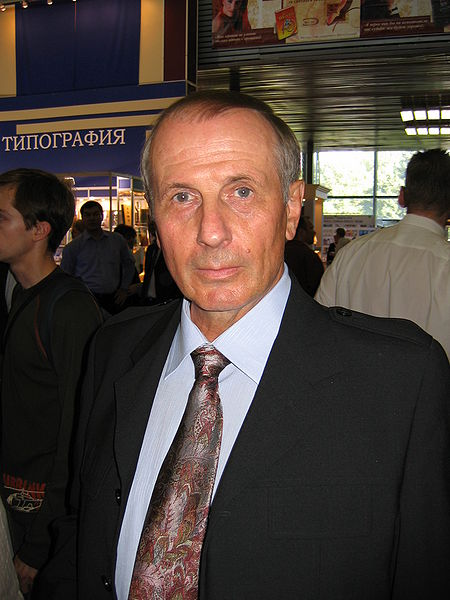
- Mikhail Veller in 2005
- Born: May 20, 1948 (age 78); Kamianets-Podilskyi, Ukrainian SSR, Soviet Union
- Education: Saint Petersburg State University
- Spouse: Anna Agriomati
- Writing career
- Genres: Short story, opinion journalism

Mikhail Iosifovich Veller (also sometimes Weller; Russian: Михаи́л Ио́сифович Ве́ллер) (born May 20, 1948) is a Russian and Soviet writer and philosopher. He holds a dual citizenship of Russia and Estonia.

== Biography ==
Veller was born in Kamianets-Podilskyi, Ukrainian SSR, Soviet Union (modern day Ukraine) into a family of Jewish origin in 1948. In 1972, he graduated with a degree in linguistics from Leningrad University. He worked as a children's summer camp counselor, a hunter in Taimyr, a shepherd in the Altai Mountains, a logger, a journalist, a teacher, and more - around 30 occupations and professions in all.

Veller's first book, a collection of short stories titled I Wanna Be A Yard-Sweeper, was published in Estonia in 1983, followed by Heart Breaker (1988), Technology of a Short Story (1989), and Rendezvous with a Celebrity (1990). The Adventures of Major Zvyagin (1991) and "The Legends of Nevsky Prospect" (1993) became bestsellers. His book Everything about Life (1998) is a book about how the world works, why no one ever has what they need, and why happiness is not achievable but should be sought (his later book Cassandra updates this philosophy). His mini-novel The Knife of Seryozha Dovlatov created a literary scandal. His latest bestseller, Courier from Pisa (2000), has had 11 editions.

In Everything about Life Veller repeated Ernest Hemingway's words: "There are people who want to know everything and those who are sick of what they already know. The latter say nothing to prevent things from turning for the worse, while the former interfere in all, hoping to make things better" (paraphrased). Veller proclaims himself to be with the former kind.

Veller nurtures his world-view to the point that he publishes volumes with a philosophical inclination. According to his theory of energoevolutionism, the primordial energy released in the Big Bang is attached to material structures of ever increasing complexity, which in their turn decompose and release energy. These cycles continue at ever-increasing speed. Human existence is entangled in this process and also increases the speed of evolution. Humankind is thus at the cutting edge of the universe's evolution. The end of history is to arrive when post-humanity will facilitate the release of all energy from matter, thereby triggering a new cycle by the next Big Bang. Within the concept of energoevolution, Veller also addresses aesthetics, sociology, and psychology. Veller's philosophical essays achieved some attention in Russia and abroad, but also met with severe criticism from some professional philosophers.

In his free time, Veller lives in Moscow but continues to work in Tallinn.
