= Aleksey Slapovsky =

Russian novelist (1957–2023)

- Алексей Слаповский
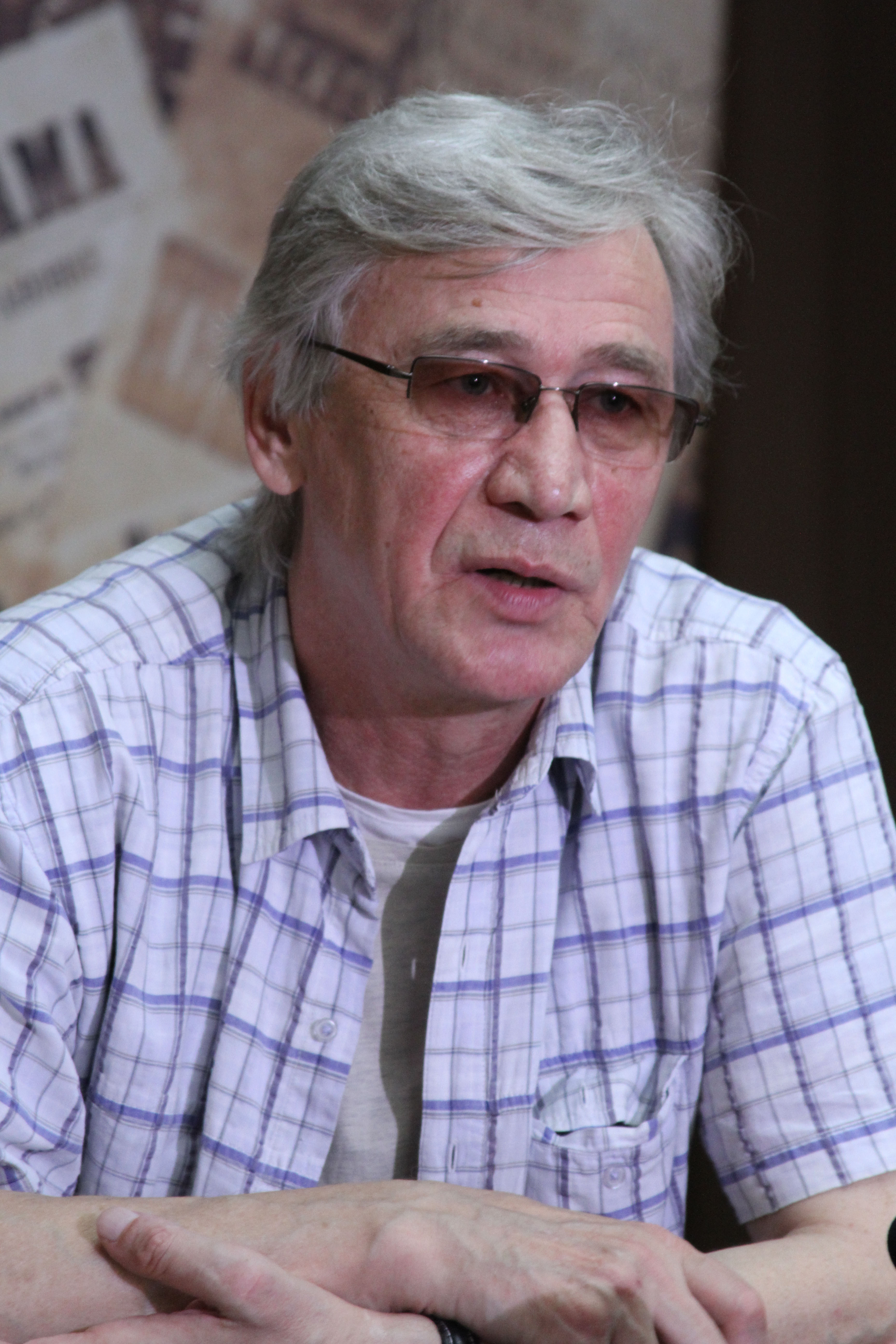
- Slapovsky in 2015
- Born: 29 July 1957; Saratov, Soviet Union (now Russia)
- Died: 8 January 2023 (aged 65)
- Education: University of Saratov

Aleksey Ivanovich Slapovsky (Russian: Алексе́й Ива́нович Слаповский; 29 July 1957 – 8 January 2023) was a Russian novelist. He was born in Saratov region, and attended the University of Saratov where he studied philology. He worked variously as a school teacher, a truck driver, and a journalist for TV and radio. Between 1990 and 1995, he worked at the magazine Volga.

Slapovsky started his literary career as a playwright in the 1980s, before switching to the novel. Noted works include Sincere Artist, Unwritten Novel (1990) and It's Not Me. He has been nominated several times for the Russian Booker Prize.

Slapovsky died from pneumonia on 8 January 2023 at the age of 65.
