= Nikolai Nekrasov (disambiguation) =

Nikolay Nekrasov (Russian: Николай Некрасов; 1821–1878) was a Russian poet.

Nikolay Nekrasov or Nikolai Nekrasov may also refer to the following notable people:

- Nikolai Vissarionovich Nekrasov (1879–1940), Russian liberal politician
- Nikolai Vladimirovich Nekrasov (1900–1938), Soviet Esperanto writer, translator, and critic
