= Andrei Volos =

Russian writer

- Андрей Волос
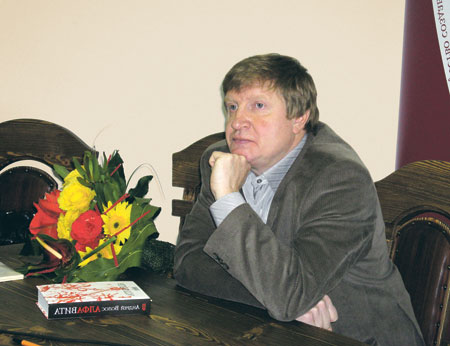
- Born: 4 August 1955 (age 71); Stalinabad, Soviet Union
- Education: Gubkin Moscow Institute of Petrochemical and Gas Industry
- Occupation: Writer
- Awards: (2000)

Andrei Germanovich Volos (Russian: Андрей Германович Волос; born 4 August 1955) is a Russian writer.

His first novel Khurramabad received the State Prize of the Russian Federation in literature and arts for year 2000.

== Biography ==
Born in Stalinabad (Dushanbe), Tajik SSR in the family of a candidate of geological and mineralogical sciences German Stepanovich Volos. Graduated from the Gubkin Moscow Institute of Petrochemical and Gas Industry, specializing in "industrial geophysics" (1977).

Returned to Dushanbe, where he was engaged in translations of Tajik poetry. In 1979, he debuted with his own poems in the magazine "Pamir".

His first book, a poetry collection "Old Highway", was published in 1988.

Until 1994, he worked in Moscow as a geophysicist and programmer, was engaged in real estate activities, and twice entered the Maxim Gorky Literature Institute.

In 1986, he debuted as a prose writer, publishing his first story in the magazine, in 1989 his collection of short stories and novellas "Team 22/19" was published.

In 1991 he was accepted into the Union of Soviet Writers.

His first novel, Khurramabad (2000), received the Russian State Prize, as well as the Antibooker, Moscow-Penne, and Znamya magazine awards.

In his novel, The Winner (2008), the writer recreated the circumstances of the storming of the presidential palace in Kabul. The hero of the novel, Return to Panjrud (2013), is the great Tajik and Persian poet Rudaki.

His works have been translated into English, German, and Mongolian.

He is a member of the Moscow Writers' Union, the PEN Club, and the public council of the Novy Mir magazine. He is a professor of literary craftsmanship at the Maxim Gorky Literature Institute.

He lives in Moscow.

== Novels ==
- Khurramabad «Хуррамабад», 2000 (the Tajik spelling of "-abad" is used in translation because the novel alludes to Dushanbe)
- Real Estate «Недвижимость», 2001
- Maskaw Mecca «Маскавская Мекка», 2003
- Animator «Аниматор», 2005
- The Victor «Победитель», 2008
- Return to Panjrud «Возвращение в Панджруд», 2013

== Awards ==
Writer's literary awards include:

- 2013: Russian Booker award, for Return to Panjrud
- 2013: Russian Student Booker award, for Return to Panjrud
- 2013: Ivan Bunin literary award
- 2001: State Prize of the Russian Federation in literature and arts, Russia for 2000, for Khurramabad
- 2000: Novy Mir magazine award, Russia for Khurramabad published in the magazine
- 1998: Anti-Booker Prize, Russia, for the manuscript of Khurramabad
- 1998: Moscow Penne Award, Italy, for a series of stories upon which Khurramabad was to be based
