= German Sadulaev =

Russian writer

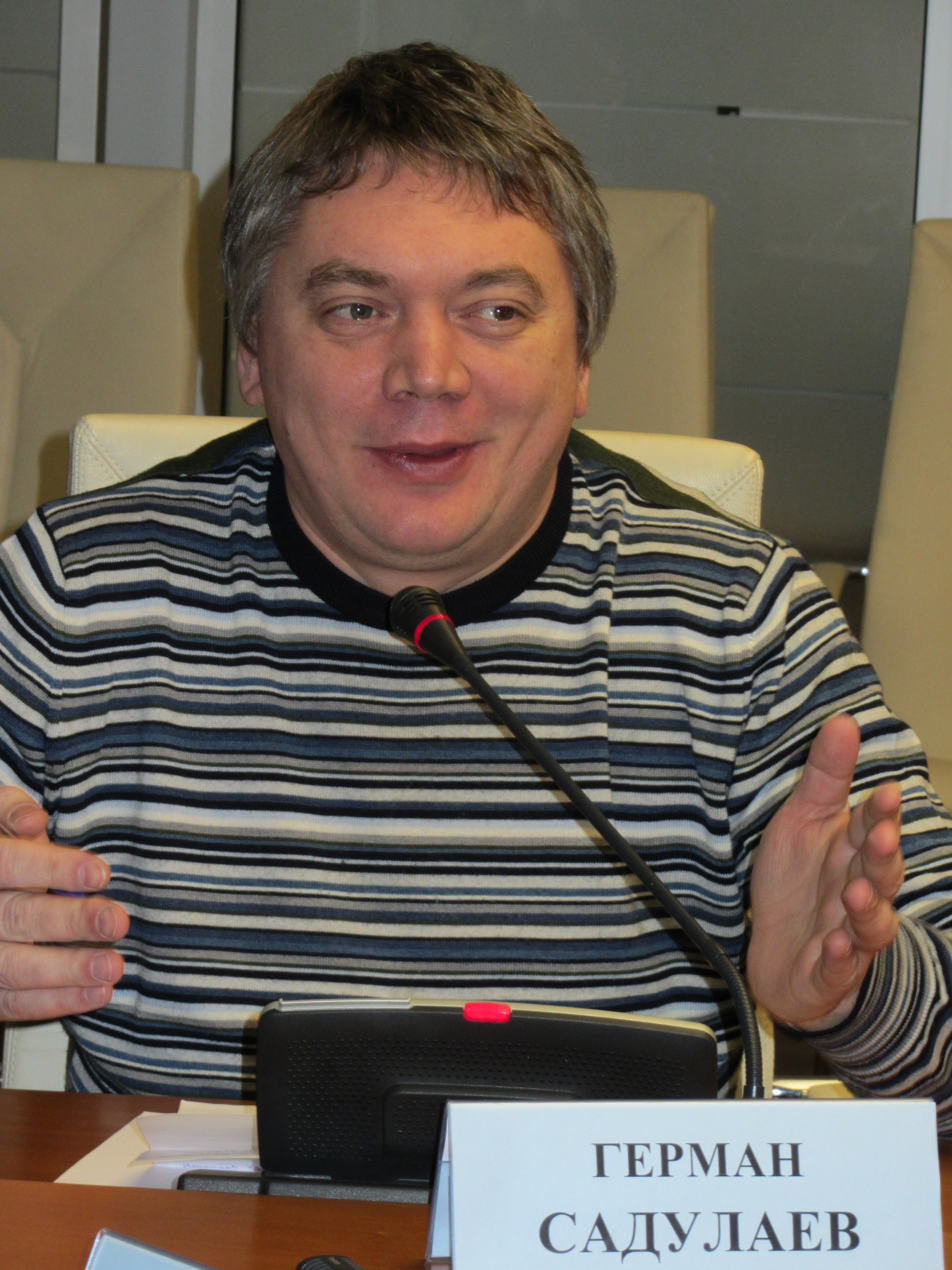
- Sadulayev at the press conference about the shortlisted authors of the Russian Prize, Yeltsin Center, Moscow, 20.03.2012
- Born: 18 February 1973 (age 53); Shali, Chechen Republic
- Occupation: novelist
- Writing career
- Language: Russian, English

German Umaralievich Sadulaev (Russian: Герман Умаралиевич Садулаев, born 2 February 1973) is a Russian writer of Chechen origin.

== Biography ==
German Sadulaev was born in 1973, in the town of Shali, in the Chechen-Ingush ASSR, to a Chechen father and Terek Cossack mother. His father's mother was also a Russian. Because his grandmother was an ethnic Russian, she and the children were not deported as part of Aardakh in 1944, but the father, a Chechen, was, thus separating his father's nuclear family, until they were reunited when the Chechens were allowed to return from their exile in Central Asia. During his childhood, the Sadulaev family had views that were at times considered pro-Russian by other Chechens. Sadulaev identifies himself as an ethnic Chechen; according to traditional Chechen culture one is considered a member of the ethnic group as well as the specific teip by patrilineal descent. He was born into the teip of Ersenoy.

In 1989, aged sixteen, he left Chechnya to study law at Leningrad State University. Today he lives and works as a lawyer in St Petersburg.

German Sadulaev's first book, Radio FUCK, told city tales of the thirty-something generation in St Petersburg. It made no mention of Chechnya. With the publication of his second book, I am a Chechen!, critics acclaimed Sadulaev as "the literary find of the year" . Much more than a war novel, it was a lyrical fusion of exotic legends, stories and memories, nominated for the National Bestseller prize. Sadulaev's next work, Snowstorm, or The Myth of the End of the World, was a grotesque fantasy satire about social Darwinism. It won the Eureka prize. Sadulaev's fourth book, The Maya Pill, was shortlisted for the 2008 Russian Booker and for the 2009 National Bestseller .

German Sadulaev's I am a Chechen! (translated by Anna Gunin) was published by Harvill Secker in 2010. The Maya Pill (translated by Carol Apollonio) will be published by Dalkey Archive Press in 2013.

In 2016, he ran for Duma as a representative of the Communist Party of the Russian Federation.

== Works ==
- Radio FUCK / Радио FUCK (2006)
- I am a Chechen! (2010) / Я – чеченец! (2006)
- Snowstorm, or The Myth of the End of the World / Пурга, или Миф о конце света (2008)
- The Maya Pill (2013) / Таблетка (2008)
