= Roman Senchin =

Russian Writer (born 1971)

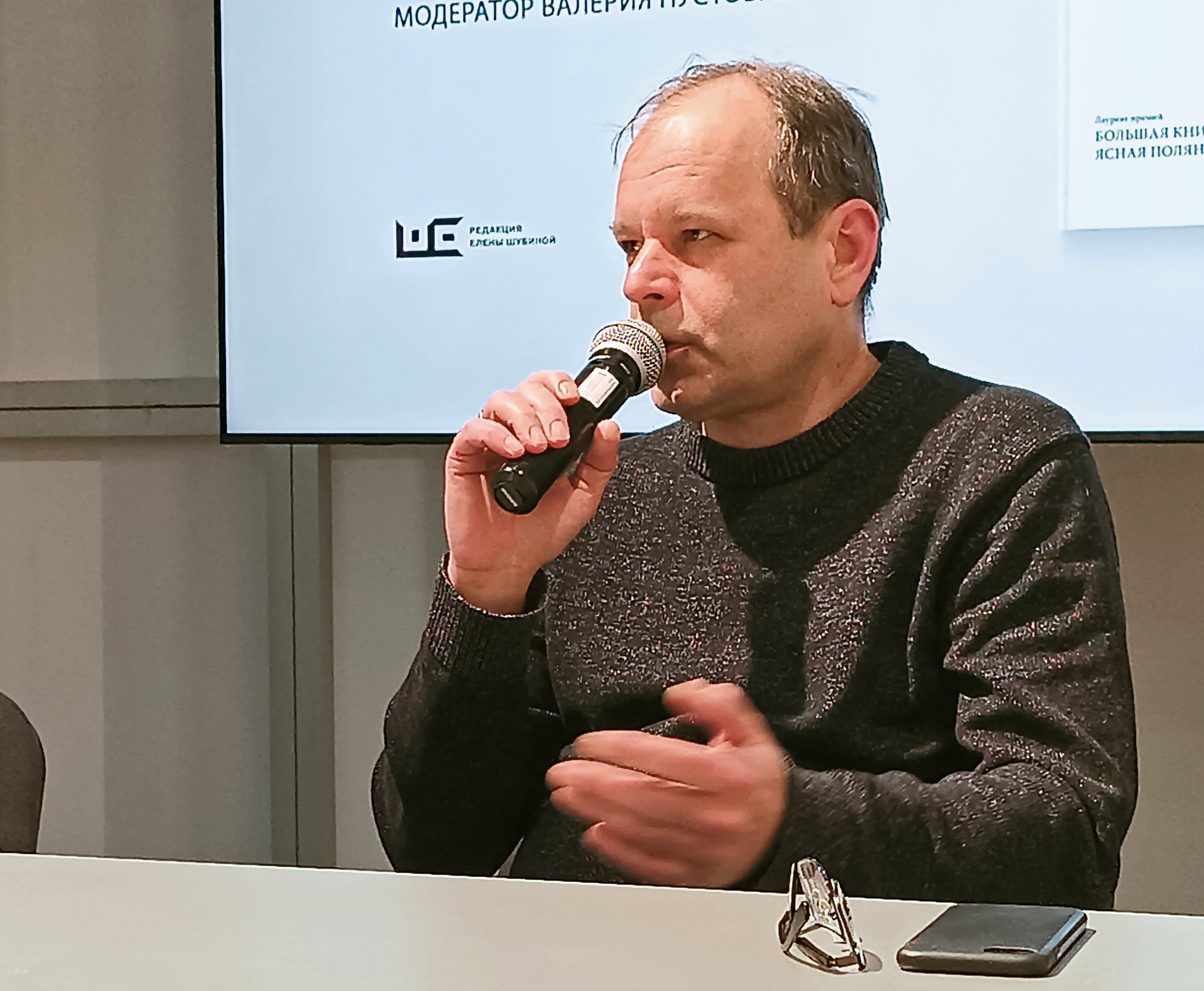
Roman Senchin

Roman Senchin (born 1971) is a Russian writer. He was born in Kyzyl in the Republic of Tuva, did army service in the Karelia region and now lives in Ekaterinburg. He is best known for his 2009 novel The Yeltyshevs – a work in the post-Soviet "chernukha" (akin to film noir) genre – which was nominated for a string of prestigious literary prizes. Other books include Athens Nights, The Information, Minus, and Nubuck.
