= Elena Nekrasova =

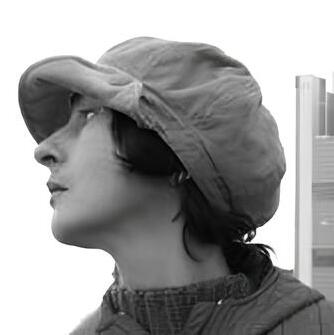
Nekrasova in 2008

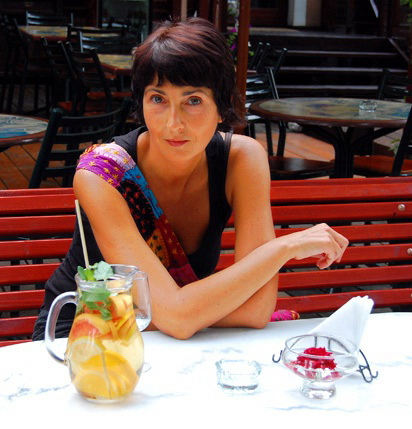
Nekrasova in 2009

Elena Nekrasova is a writer, filmmaker and contemporary artist. Exhibitions of her paintings took place in Ukraine, Russia, United States, Japan, Germany, Denmark, Poland and other paintings are in many museums and private collections.

Nekrasovа creates documentary films and video art. Since 2005, also she writes prose.

She graduated from the biochemical faculty of Odessa State University and the Institute of Cinematography in Moscow. Nekrasova is one of the founders of the "Ukrainian transavant-garde" - a new movement in Ukrainian art that emerged in Odessa and Kyiv in the late 1980s and 1990s.

Since 2000, she has also made documentary films, as well as films commissioned by the George Soros Foundation and received awards at film festivals. In 2010-2012, she sailed around the world. During her travels, she filmed a documentary series From land to land and wrote the documentary novel Pacific Pace.

Currently, she is making documentary films about the war.

== Exhibitions ==
- "New Figurations" (Odesa, 1989)
- "Babylon" (Moscow, 1990)
- "After Modernism — 2" (Odesa, 1990)
- "Ukrainske MalARTstvo” (Kiev/Odense, Denmark/Munich) 1990
- "To the Soul, a Wanderer..." (Odesa, ART Museum 1992)
- "Stepy Europy" (Warsaw, 1993) and projects in Chicago, New York, Rosenheim, Prague
- Two exhibition in Hamburg in the gallery Helen Peter, 1993-94
- Exhibition in Prague in the gallery "Valentine", 1994-95
- Curator of the project "Dreams" in the first museum of contemporary art in Odessa (TIRS)
