= Dmitri Lipskerov =

Russian writer and dramatist

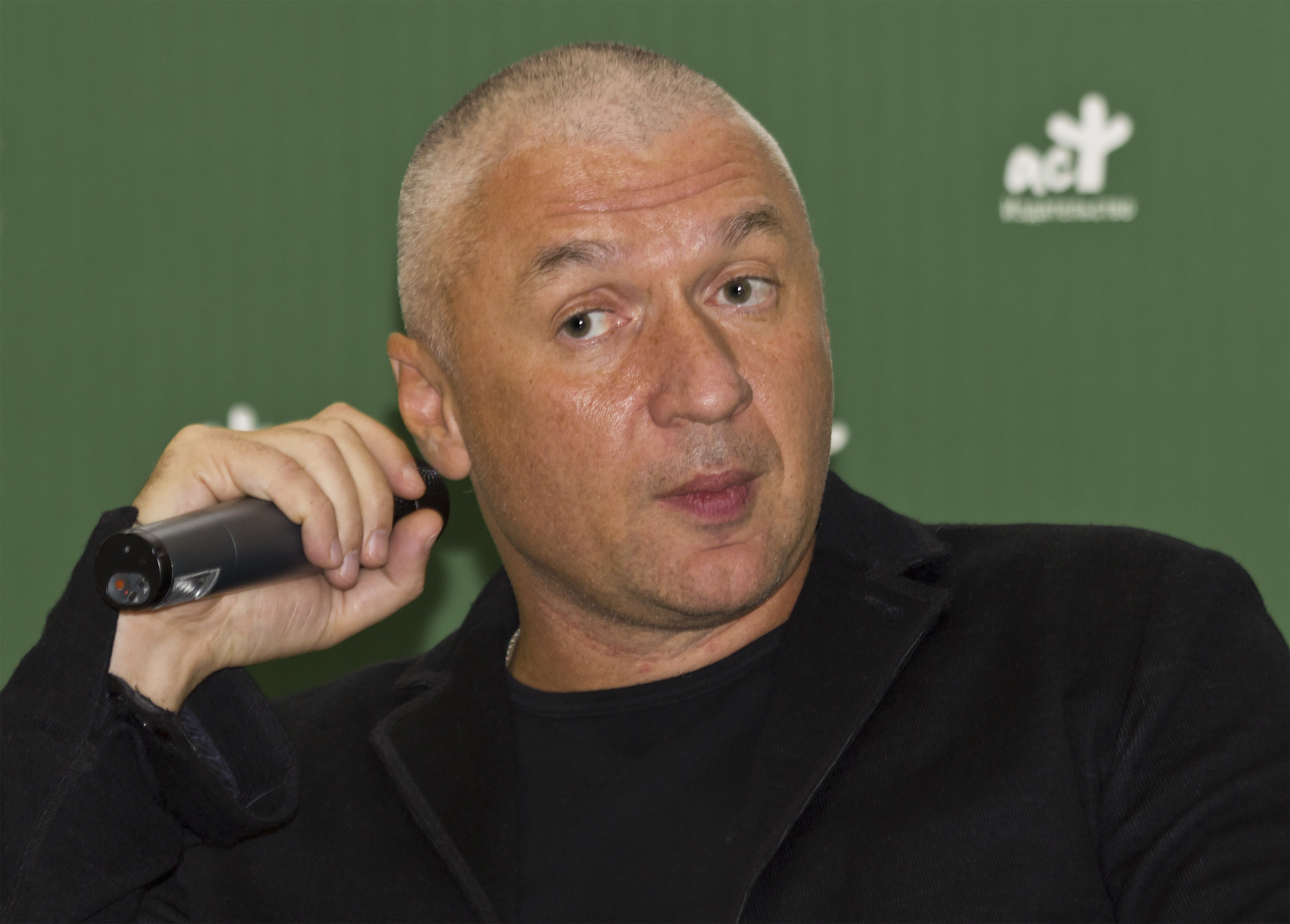
Lipskerov in 2013

Dmitri Mikhailovich Lipskerov (Russian: Дми́трий Миха́йлович Ли́пскеров; born February 19, 1964, in Moscow, Russia) is a Russian writer and dramatist.

== Biography ==
Dmitri Lipskerov was born on February 19th 1964 in Moscow, Soviet Union into the family of a well-known dramatist and cartoon animator («Ограбление по…», «Волк и телёнок») Mikhail Lipskerov, and Inna Lipskerova, a music editor in the State House of Radio and Audio Recording. In 1981-1985 he studied in the prestigious Boris Shchukin Theater Institute. A year before graduating, in 1984 he played a part in the film Osoboe Podrazdelenie (Special Unit) made by Georgi Shchukin.

Dmitri began his writing career as a dramatist. In 1989 under the supervision Oleg Tabakov the author staged his first play, Reka Na Asfalte (River on Asphalt), which later put on in more than 1,500 theatres and theatre studios. The play Schkola Dlya Immigrantov (School for Immigrants), first written in 1988 under the name of Schkola S Teatral’nym Uklonom (Theatre School), was staged in Lenkom in 1990, starring famous actors, such as Oleg Yankovsky, Aleksandr Zbruyev, Aleksandr Abdulov and Nikolai Karachentsov.

Dmitri Lipskerov is a winner of the Moscow Komsomol Prize and also the youngest member of the Soviet Writers Union, which he joined in 1989. In 1991 he had left the Soviet Union to go to the US, where he lived until 1993.

Following the above-mentioned events, Dmitri had turned away from writing plays. The journal Noviy Mir published the writer's first novel Sorok let Chanchzhoe (The Forty Years of Chanchzhoeh) appeared in Novyi Mir in 1996, and the following year was published by Vagrius. The novel quickly gained fame and was included in the shortlist of the Russian Booker Award. In 1997-1998 he was the author of the television game Zolotaya Likhoradka (Gold Rush), which appeared on ORT.

In 1998 Lipskerov together with a state deputy Andrey Skoch became a co-founder of the Debut prize for works of fiction by young Russian writers. During the first year, he was head of the jury as well as the chairman of the board of trustees.

In 2000-2001 Vagrius published the author's three-volume of works and later in 2002 – a five-volume collection of works in the publishing house Exmo-Press. In 2004 the publishing house Olma-Press releases another three-volume of works. AST joined in by publishing an eight-volume collection in 2007 and a five-volume collection later in the years. Altogether, Dmitri Lipskerov is an author of 11 novels, dozens of tales and stories, adding to more than 20 plays.

In 2006-2010 Dmitri was a member of the Civic Chamber of the Russian Federation in the position of a Deputy Chairman of the Commission on Culture.

In 2008 he established a literature prize Neformat. The president thanked Dmitri Lipskerov for his contribution to the development of domestic literature and active social activity.

The author rarely gives interviews, preferring a concealed lifestyle.

A little-known fact about Dmitri is that his book Vsyakiy Kapitan Primadonna (Any Captain is a Primadonna) was published after Dmitri himself sailed across the Atlantic Ocean, from the Caribbean to Europe, having never before had any experience sailing. The book includes comical snippets that are excerpts from his real-life experience of crossing the Atlantic with only two other people on board.

Lipskerov lives in Moscow, and in addition to his literary work, is known as a successful restaurant owner. Dmitri's most prominent restaurant, cleverly named, Ris i Riba (Rice and Fish) was one of the largest and oldest, and widely regarded as one of the best sushi establishments in Moscow and all of Russia.

Married to Ekaterina Lipskerova. He has three children: Konstantin, Sofia and Aleksandr.

== Controversy ==
On June 3, 2005, Lipskerov (together with radio personality A.Gordon) has circulated an "Open letter to journalists of radio station Echo of Moscow" expressing support for state-run campaign against Mikhail Khodorkovsky directed on takeover of his oil company Yukos which culminated in Khodorkovski's conviction and imprisonment. In subsequent discussions there followed allegations of revival of Soviet tradition of KGB-orchestrated participation of intelligentsia in 'public campaign of protest' along with staged show trials.

== Bibliography ==
- Sorok let Chanchzhoe (The Forty Years of Chanchzhoeh) - 1997
- Prostranstvo Gotliba (The Gottlieb's Space) - 1998
- Poslednii Son Razuma (Last Dream of Reason) - 2000
- Pal'tsy dlia Kerolain (Fingers for Caroline) - 2001
- Rodichi (Relatives) - 2001
- Edipov Kompleks (Oedipus Complex) - 2002
- Russkoe stakkato - britanskoi materi (Russian Staccato for the British Mother) - 2002
- Oseni ne budet nikogda (Autumn Never Comes) - 2004
- Leonid Obyazatelno Umret (Leonid Will Certainly Die) - 2006
- Demoni v Rayu (Demons in Heaven) - 2008
- Myaso Snegerya (The Meat of a Bullfinch) - 2009
- Vsyakiy Kapitan Primadonna (Any Captain is a Primadonna) - 2011
- Teoria Opisavshegovsia Malchika (The Theory of the Boy Who Wet Himself) - 2013
