= Vladimir Makanin =

Russian writer

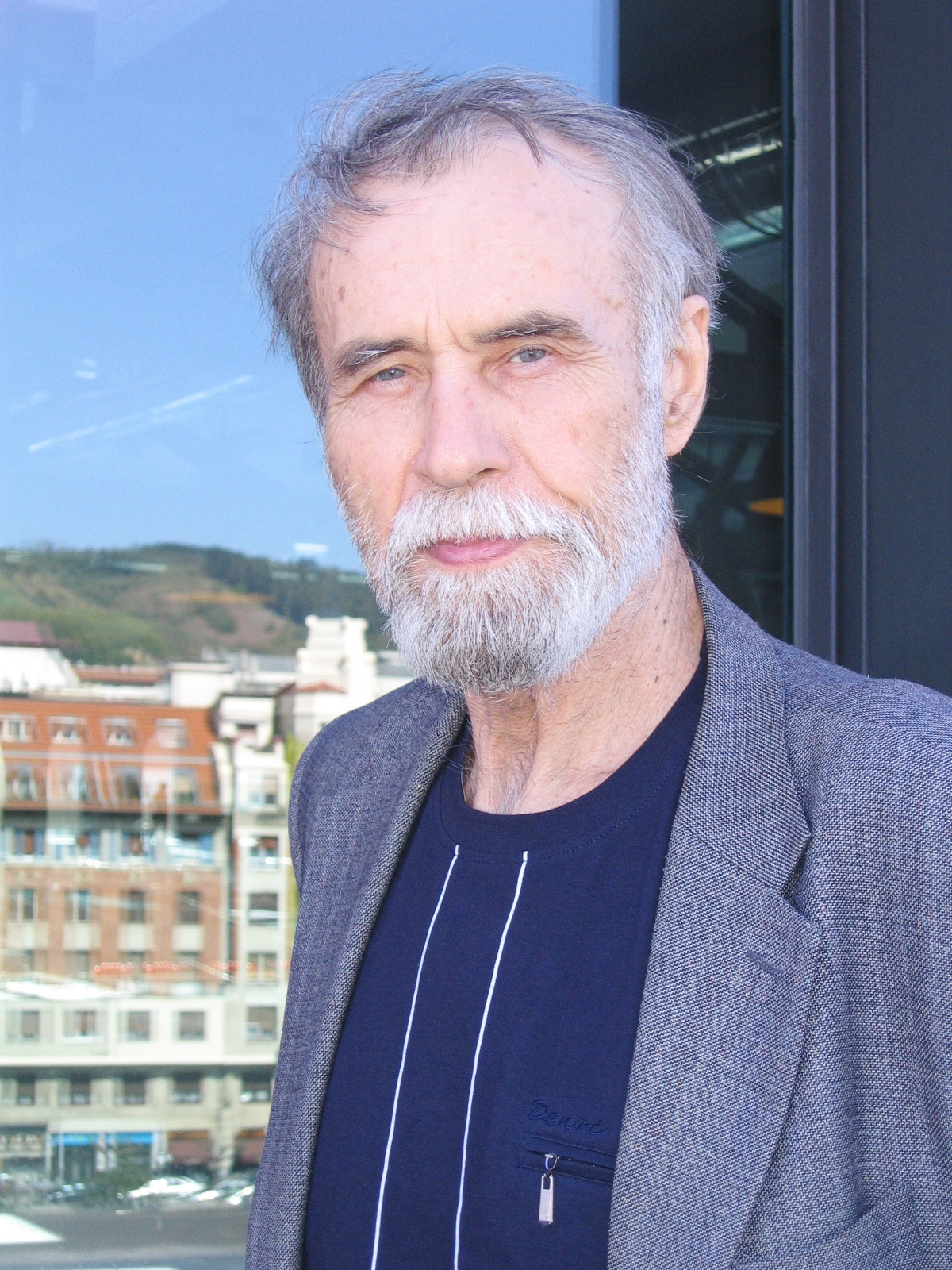
Vladimir Makanin in Bilbao, 2011

Vladimir Semyonovich Makanin (Russian: Владимир Семёнович Маканин; 13 March 1937 in Orsk, Orenburg Oblast, RSFSR, Soviet Union – 1 November 2017 in Krasny, Aksaysky District, Rostov Oblast, Russia) was a Russian writer of novels and short stories.

== Life ==
Makanin graduated from the Faculty of Mechanics and Mathematics at Moscow State University and worked as a teacher in the Military Academy until the early 1960s. In 1963 he took the High Courses for Scriptwriters and Film Directors at the Gerasimov Institute of Cinematography, then worked for the publishing house Sovietskiy Pisatel (The Soviet Writer).

He published his first book in 1965. In 1985, he became a board member at the Union of Soviet Writers and, two years later, joined the editorial staff at Znamya. He spent most of his later years in Krasny, near Rostov-on-Don. In 2007, he headed the jury for the Big Book award. The following year, he was the recipient.

Makanin's writing style may be categorized as realist. His forte lies in depicting the psychological impact of everyday life experiences.

== English translations ==
- Antileader, from The New Soviet Fiction, Abbeville Press, NY, 1989.
- Baize-covered Table with Decanter, Readers International, 1995.
- Escape Hatch, and The Long Road Ahead, Ardis Publishers, 1996.
- The Loss, Northwestern University Press, 1998.

== Selected bibliography ==
- Straight line (Russian: Прямая линия), 1965
- Blue and Red (Голубое и красное), 1975
- The Portrait and Around (Портрет и вокруг), 1978
- Antileader (Антилидер), 1980
- Ancestor (Предтеча), 1982
- He and She (Один и одна), 1987
- The Underground, or a Hero of Our Time (Андерграунд, или Герой нашего времени), 1999
- Asan (Acaн), 2008

== Awards ==
- 1984 Order of the Badge of Honour
- 1993 Russian Booker Prize for Baize-covered Table with Decanter
- 1998 Pushkin Prize for his oeuvre
- 1999 State Prize of the Russian Federation
- 2001 Italian Premio Penne
- 2008 Big Book Award for Asan
- 2012 European Prize for Literature
