= Zuleikha Opens Her Eyes (TV series) =

Russian television series

- Russian: Зулейха открывает глаза
- Genre: Drama
- Based on: Zuleikha by Guzel Yakhina
- Written by: Anna Anosova; Larisa Leonenko; Vasily Pavlov
- Directed by: Egor Anashkin
- Starring: Chulpan Khamatova; Evgeny Morozov; Yulia Peresild; Roman Madyanov; Sergey Makovetskiy; Aleksandr Bashirov; Aleksandr Sirin; Elena Shevchenko; Dmitriy Kulichkov; Roza Khayrullina
- Opening theme: "Ay bılbılım" by Dina Garipova
- Composer: Dmitry Dankov
- Country of origin: Russia
- Original language: Russian
- No. of seasons: 1
- No. of episodes: 8

Production
- Executive producer: Ilya Papernov
- Producers: Aleksandr Kushaev; Irina Smirnova; Anton Zlatopolskiy
- Cinematography: Shandor Berkeshi; Aleksey Fedorov
- Running time: 47—58 minutes
- Production company: Kinokompaniya Russkoe

Original release
- Network: Russia 1
- Release: April 13 – April 22, 2020

Zuleikha Opens Her Eyes (Russian: Зулейха открывает глаза, romanized: Zuleikha otkrivaet glaza) is a Russian television historical fiction drama series based on the novel Zuleikha by Guzel Yakhina and aired on channel Russia-1 in April 2020. The series stars Chulpan Khamatova as Zuleikha Valieva, a peasant woman from the Tatar village in the Soviet Union.

== Plot ==
It's the story of a peasant woman Zuleikha from the small Tatar village. In 1930 there is the Soviet campaign of political repressions of kulaks. Zuleikha's husband resisted dekulakization and was killed by communists. Zuleikha was transported to Siberia and left in a remote location on Angara River with little means of survival. She had to overcome the harsh conditions, build relationships with other exiles and forge her new identity and reasons for living.

== Cast and characters ==
- Chulpan Khamatova as Zuleikha
- Evgeny Morozov as Ivan Ignatov
- Yulia Peresild as Nastasya
- Roman Madyanov as Zinovy Kuznec
- Sergey Makovetskiy as Wolf Karlovich Leibe
- Aleksandr Bashirov as Vasily Gorelov
- Aleksandr Sirin as Konstantin Arnoldovich
- Elena Shevchenko as Isabella
- Dmitriy Kulichkov as Ikonnikov
- Roza Khayrullina as Zuleikha's mother-in-law

== Production ==
Zuleikha Opens Her Eyes is a screen version of the best-selling novel by Guzel Yakhina. The book won the Yasnaya Polyana Literary Award and the Big Book Award in 2015.

The filming of the TV series was first announced in March 2016 and began on September 11, 2018. The main part of the entire series was filmed in Tatarstan. On the bank of the Kama River in the city of Laishevo, the historical settlement of Semruk was built. Part of the filming took place in the ethnographic complex Tatar Avyly in the village of Isakovo, Zelenodolsky District of Tatarstan.

== Reception ==
=== Critical reception ===
The series received mixed reviews from viewers, critics and public figures.

On 15 April 2020 the chairman of the political party Communists of Russia Maxim Suraykin said the film desecrated the memory of the Soviet past and announced the preparation of an official appeal to the leadership of the TV channel Russia-1 to stop the show of the series on the air.

On 17 April 2020 the head of the Spiritual assembly of muslims of Russia Albir Krganov sent the letters to the chairman of VGTRK Oleg Dobrodeev and the head of FADN Igor Barinov to clarificate contents of the second series with a sex scene in a mosque and the use of the names of prominent Muslim figures among the exiles.

=== Awards and nominations ===
2020 – Chulpan Khamatova was recognized as the best actress of the series-2020 for playing the main role (Association of Film and Television Producers Award (APKiT)).

Year	Award	Category	Nominee	Ref.	Result
2021	9th Russian TV and Film Producers Association Award	Best Screenplay	Zuleikha Opens Her Eyes	|| style="background: #9EFF9E; color: #000; vertical-align: middle; text-align: center; " class="yes table-yes2 notheme"|Won	
