= Pro knigi =

Pro Knigi (About Books) (Russian: Про книги. Журнал библиофила) – is a quarterly educational magazine that contains information about old books, the study thereof, the history of bibliophiles and the problems of book-collecting. It has been published in Moscow since 2007. The circulation of the magazine is about 2000 copies. It is distributed both by retail and subscription.

== Founding ==
Pro Knigi was supposed to be the keeper of traditions in the bibliophile period press of the early twentieth century. Before it, some magazines were published by a bookseller and collector N. Solovyev, "Anticvar" (1902–1903) and "Russian bibliophile" (1911–1916). The board of publishers of the magazine has been led by the Head of the National union of Bibliophiles, the Head of Federal Agency on Press and Mass Communications of the Russian Federation, M. Seslavinsky, since 2008.

== The content of the magazine ==
Pro Knigi is considered to be an authentic guide to a bibliophile's life in the early twenty-first century.

The magazine contains many articles about rare books, published both in Russia and abroad, unique historical documents, reviews of the results of Moscow auctions and the trading of Russian books at European and USA antiquarian bookselling fairs, "bibliophile travelling" to different cities of the world (Odessa, Firenze, Berlin, Paris, Genève, London, Ottawa, Barcelona).

Genres such as "portraits of bibliophiles and old-time books admirers" are also reflected in the pages of the magazine: an interview with the literary critic and bibliographer L. Turchinsky, the French bibliophile Renne Gera, the graphic artist D. Bekker, the outstanding Russian mathematician, famous bibliophile M. Bashmakov, some fragments of the national artist of the USSR, O. Basilashvili's reminiscences, the Siberian bibliophile B. Varava's memoirs, the recollections of the soviet actor and bibliophile N. Smirnov-Sokolsy, the bibliographer and publisher P. Efremov, the book artist F. Rozhanovsky.

There are also some subject magazines that describe events significant for Russian book culture, such as A. Block's 130th Birthday (2010, No. 3), N. Gogol's 200th Birthday (2009, No. 1), and also fascicles in memory of N. Gumilev (2011. No. 4) and N. Smirnov-Sokolsky (2012. No. 1), 200 year anniversary since the end of the Great Patriotic War of the year 1812 (2012, No. 3).

There are members of the National bibliophiles’ union, leading library contributors (RSL, RNL), contributors of museums, galleries, arts critics, book historians, and also experts in antiquarian book trading among the magazine's authors. They are: a bibliologist E. Nemirovsky, bibliophile A. Finkelstein, a literary critic, Russian futurism researcher A. Parnis, a national graphic design classicist, arts critic V. Krichevsky. One of the leading Russian book graphic artists I. Sakurov and a famous national comic book artist A. Ayoshin work with the magazine.

A genuine interest among readers was aroused by bibliophilic anecdotes, illustrated by the great Russian artist I. Dmitrenko, and also a bibliophile comic story "The Moscow bibliophile’s revenge" (plot by M. Seslavinsky, pictures by A. Ayoshin).

== The medal "For the personal contributions to the development of national Bibliophilia in the name of N. Smirnov-Sokolsky" ==
Together with the National Union of Bibliophiles, Pro Knigi is the founder of honours "For the personal contributions to the development of national Bibliophilia in the name of N. Smirnov-Sokolsky". O. Lasunsky, V. Petritsky, I. Chertkov (2013) and Y. Berdichevsky (2014) were awarded the medal.

== The magazine in philately ==
The publishing centre Marka printed a decorative marked envelope specially for the magazine's fifth anniversary. The ceremony of introducing it was held on 5 September during the 25th Moscow International Book Fair.
