= Aleksandr Kabakov =

Russian writer (1943–2020)

- Александр Кабаков
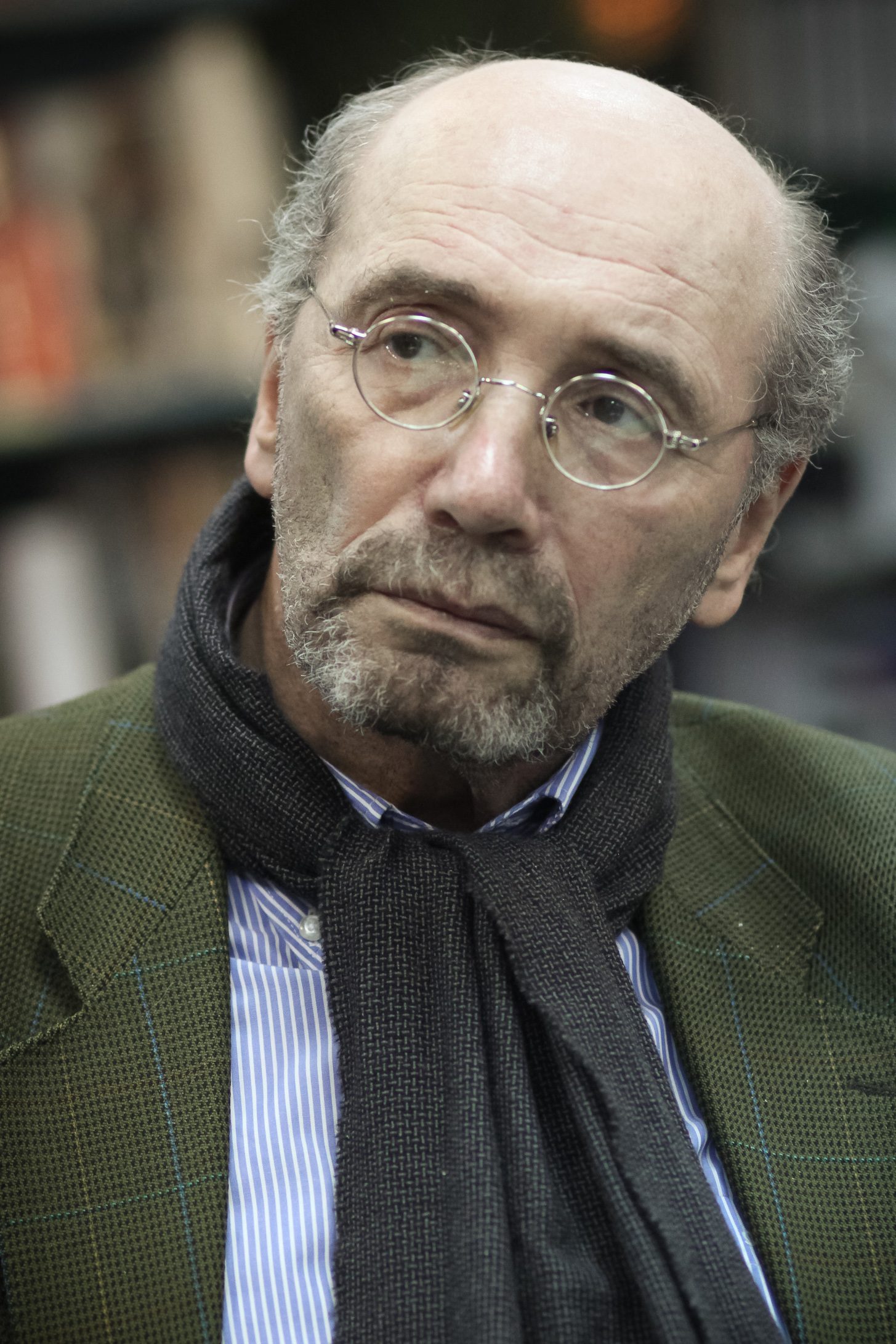
- Born: Aleksandr Abramovich Kabakov; 23 October 1943; Novosibirsk, Soviet Union
- Died: 18 April 2020 (aged 76); Moscow, Russia
- Occupations: Writer and journalist
- Aleksandr Kabakov's voice from the Echo of Moscow program, 30 June 2006

Aleksandr Abramovich Kabakov (Russian: Александр Абрамович Кабаков; (22 October 1943 - 18 April 2020), was a Russian writer and journalist.

== Biography ==
Aleksandr Kabakov was born on 22 October 1943 in Novosibirsk, where his family had been evacuated during World War II. He studied mechanics and mathematics in Dnipropetrovsk, and worked in a missile factory after graduation. Eventually, he landed at the railroad industry newspaper Gudok, where he worked for more than a decade; he also worked at Moscow News and Kommersant.

He became well known during the Perestroika period for his dystopian novel No Return, which was translated into multiple languages and also adapted into a film. The English translation was done by Thomas Whitney. Other noted works include The Last Hero (1995) and Nothing's Lost (2003), which won the second jury prize from the Big Book Award and the Apollon Grigoriev Prize. With Yevgeny Popov, he co-wrote a book of reminiscences about the writer Vasily Aksyonov that was shortlisted for the 2012 Big Book Award.

He died in Moscow on 18 April 2020.

== Works ==
- Aksyonov (co-written with Evgeny Popov) – second jury prize, Big Book Award, 2012
- Nothing's Lost – Big Book Award finalist, 2006, won second jury prize; won the Apollon Grigoriev Prize, 2004
- Moscow Tales – Big Book Award finalist, 2006; won Prose of the Year, 2005; won the Ivan Bunin Prize, 2006
- No Return (Невозвращенец) (William Morrow & Co., 1990, tr. Thomas Whitney)
- Anthologies: “Shelter” in Read Russia! (Read Russia, 2012, tr. Daniel Jaffe) and Life Stories: Original Works by Russian Writers (Russian Life, 2009, tr. Anna Seluyanova)
- A Runaway (Беглец), 2009
- The Imposter (Самозванец), 1997
