= Casual (novel) =

Novel by Oksana Robski

Casual is the debut novel by Russian writer Oksana Robski. It focuses on the lives of the Russian business elite.

== Plot ==
The main character is the wife of oligarch Serge and the mother of a young daughter. When Serge is murdered, the protagonist “hires” a person whom she believes killed her husband. It turns out that the “hired” person is innocent. Svetlana, Serge's mistress, is pregnant and gives birth. The real mastermind behind Serge's murder is Svetlana's brother, a certain Vova “Rat.” After Vova the Rat is killed, the main character flees to India.

== Reception ==
The novel was translated into English. In 2005, it was shortlisted for the National Bestseller award.

The book made Robski the first representative of the Russian upper class to publish a novel.

In the magazine Continent, Tatyana Sotnikova noted that the novel is written better than standard detective stories and the usual works of “serious prose writers”. A reviewer from Gazeta.Ru stated that the novel is sterile in literary terms and called the author a talking "Chanel" bag. For Maya Kucherskaya, the value of the novel lies in its portrayal of the "doll-like" existence of Rublevka residents.
