= Mikhail Gigolashvili =

Georgian writer (born 1954)

- მიხაილ გიგოლაშვილი
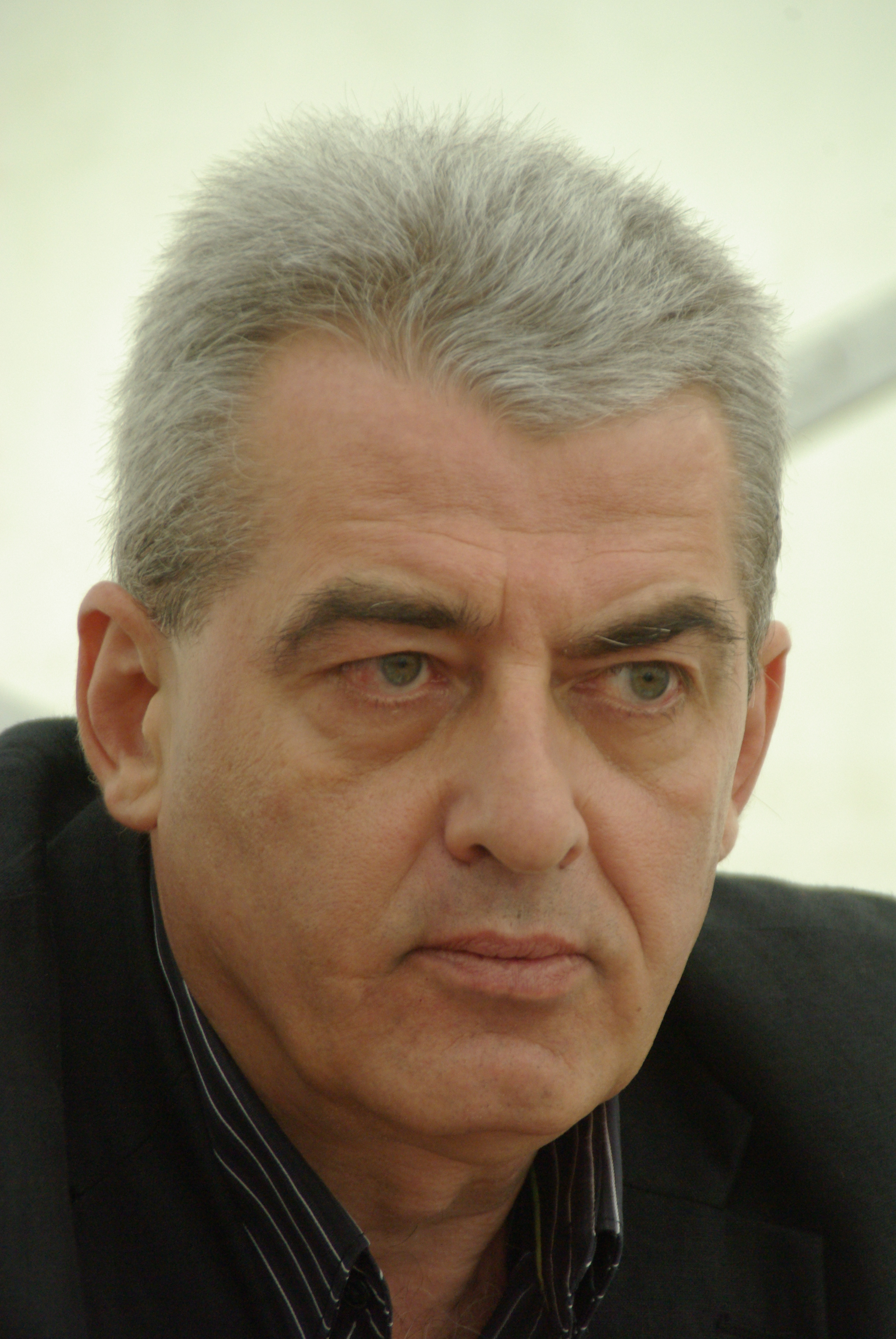
- Born: 4 March 1954 (age 72)
- Education: Tbilisi University
- Occupation: Writer
- Awards: Big Book; Russian Prize

Mikhail Gigolashvili (Georgian: მიხაილ გიგოლაშვილი; born 4 March 1954) is a Georgian-born writer who is mainly known for his Russian-language novels. He was born and raised in Tbilisi, and obtained his doctorate from Tbilisi University. He specialized in Dostoyevsky, and has stated that for a whole decade, he read nothing but Dostoevsky while he wrote his dissertation.

He is best known for his novels The Interpreter and The Devil’s Wheel; the latter, set in perestroika-era Tbilisi, was nominated for the Big Book Award. Since 1991, he has lived in Germany, where he teaches Russian at Saarland University.

== Works ==
- 1978 — novel «Иудея»
- 2003 — novel «Толмач»
- 2007 — «Тайнопись»
- 2009 — novel «Чёртово колесо»
- 2012 — novel «Захват Московии»
- 2017 — novel «Тайный год»
- 2020 — novel «Иудея, I век»
- 2021 — novel «Кока»
