= Danilkin =

Danilkin (masculine), Danilkina (feminine) is a Russian surname derived from the diminutive form Danilka from the given name Danila (Daniel). Notable people with the surname include:

- Yegor Danilkin
- Lev Danilkin
