= Big Book (award) =

Russian literary prize

- Awarded for: Best prose in Russian
- Sponsored by: Center for the Support of Domestic Literature
- Venue: Pashkov House
- Country: Russia
- Reward: 3 million RUB
- First award: 2006; 20 years ago
- Latest winner: Edward Verkin (2025)
- Website: www.bigbook.ru

Big Book (Russian: Большая Книга, romanized: Bolshaya Kniga) is a Russian literary award for best prose in Russian.

The award is financed by the founders of the Center for the Support of Domestic Literature, Russian major businessmen and business structures.

Acceptable candidates for the award are works of all prose genres, including memoirs, biographies and other documentary prose, written in or translated to Russian.

The cash reward is as follows:

- First place — 3 million rubles.
- Second place — 1.5 million rubles.
- Third place — 1 million rubles.

== Founders ==
The founder of the Big Book National Literary Award is the Center for the Support of Domestic Literature, founded by:

- Alfa-Bank JSC
- Renova Group
- Roman Abramovich, Russian-Israeli businessman, investor and politician
- Alexander Mamut, Russian lawyer, banker and investor
- LitRes e-book and audiobook service
- Chitai-Gorod bookstore chain
- GUM department store
- Medved magazine
- Video International

The chairman of the board of the center is Vladimir Grigorev, and the general director of the award and director of the center is Georgy Urushadze.

The co-founders of the award are:

- Ministry of Culture of Russia
- Federal Agency on Press and Mass Communications of the Russian Federation (FAPMC)
- Federal Agency on Culture and Cinematography
- Institute of Russian Literature of the Russian Academy of Sciences
- Russian Book Union
- Russian Library Association
- All-Russia State Television and Radio Broadcasting Company (VGTRK)
- Russian News Agency TASS
- Gazprom-Media holding
- Komsomolskaya Pravda Publishing House JSC

== Board of trustees ==
The board of trustees is the highest organ of the award. It approves and amends the regulations of the award, among other tasks.

The board of trustees is composed by:

- Oleg Sysuyev (chairman of the board) – first deputy chairman of the board of directors of Alfa-Bank and vice-president of the All-Russian Congress of Municipal Formations
- Aleksandr Avdeyev – Ambassador of Russia to the Holy See and representative of the Russian Federation to the Sovereign Order of Malta
- Vsevolod Bagno – professor of the Faculty of Philology of Saint Petersburg State University and corresponding member of the Russian Academy of Sciences (RAS)
- Oleg Dobrodeev – general director of the VGTRK
- Mikhail Seslavinsky – head of the FAPMC
- Sergei Stepashin – president of the Russian Book Union
- Viktor Fedorov – president of the Russian State Library
- Sergey Filatov – president of the Foundation for Socio-Economic and Intellectual Programs
- Mikhail Shvydkoy – special representative of the President of Russia for International Cultural Cooperation

== Award procedure ==
=== Formation of the list of nominees ("long list") ===
In the competition for the award, both published works and manuscripts can participate. Publishers, members of the Literary Academy (the jury of the award), the media, creative unions, as well as state authorities (from federal and regional level) can nominate a work or manuscript for the competition. The published work can also be put forward by the author. The work must be published (signed in print) either in the previous year or before February 28 of the current year, when acceptance of works for the award ends.

The Council of Experts selects nominees from the received applications for the "long list" (no restrictions on the number of works). Each submitted work is evaluated by at least two experts and is then recommended or rejected. The general list is finally compiled before April 30 and announced by the chairman of the Council of Experts and published on the Award's website.

=== Formation of the list of finalists ("short list") ===
The list of finalists includes from 8 to 15 works of the "long list". A collective decision is made on each work, and the majority of the experts of the board should speak for inclusion. By May 31, the list must be announced by the chairman of the Council of Experts and published on the Award's website.

=== The work of the Literary Academy (the jury) ===
The Literary Academy (award jury) consists of more than 100 people — professional writers and publishers, cultural and art workers, academics, public and state leaders, journalists and entrepreneurs.

Members of the Literary Academy get acquainted with the works from the "list of finalists" and vote on them. According to the number of points awarded, the laureates of the first, second and third awards are determined. Members of the jury may convene an in-person meeting of the Literary Academy, if it is necessary to decide on whether or not to award one or several prizes (including additional ones).

=== Selection of the Readers' Sympathy Prize ===
After the announcement of the "list of finalists", a readers' vote is opened. The first three works that receive the most points from readers are awarded with commemorative statuettes. Since 2008, it is possible to read the applicants' works.

== Council and jury chairmen ==
=== Council of Experts ===
Since the creation of the award, the chairman of the Council of Experts has been the First Deputy Editor-in-Chief of Novy Mir, Mikhail Butov.

=== Literary Academy ===
The chairmen (and co-chairmen) of the Literary Academy have been:

- 2005—2006 — writers Daniil Granin and Edvard Radzinsky
- 2006—2007 — writer Vladimir Makanin
- 2007—2008 — writer Andrei Bitov
- 2008—2011 — writer, journalist and editor-in-chief of Literaturnaya Gazeta Yury Polyakov and historian, writer and broadcaster Aleksandr Arkhangelsky
- 2012—present — literary critic and vice-rector of the RSUH Dmitry Bak.

== Winners ==
The award was first announced on November 14, 2005.

=== 2005—2006 ===
The "long list" of 71 works was announced on April 26, 2006.

The short list ("list of finalists") of 15 works was announced on May 30, 2006, at a special "Literary Dinner" at GUM.

- The results of the first season were announced on November 22, 2006:
  - First prize — Dmitry Bykov for the biography Boris Pasternak.
  - Second prize — Aleksandr Kabakov for the novel Vsyo popravimo.
  - Third prize — Mikhail Shishkin for the novel Maidenhair.
- The special prize For the Contribution to Literature was awarded to Nahum Korzhavin for the memoirs In Temptations of the Bloody Epoch.
- The Readers' Sympathy Prize, according to the results of online voting, was received by the finalists of the award: Alexei Ivanov's Zoloto bunta, Dmitry Bykov's Boris Pasternak and Lyudmila Ulitskaya's The People of Our Tsar.

=== 2006—2007 ===
The second season of the award was announced on November 28, 2006.

The "long list" contained 45 works, of which 12 became finalists.

- The winners of the second season were announced on November 22, 2007, in the Pashkov House:
  - First prize — Lyudmila Ulitskaya for the novel Daniel Stein, Interpreter.
  - Second prize — Aleksey Varlamov for the biography Aleksey Tolstoy.
  - Third prize — Dina Rubina for the novel On the Sunny Side of the Street.
- The special prize For the Contribution to Literature was awarded to Andrei Bitov and Valentin Rasputin.
- The prize For Honor and Dignity was awarded posthumously to the poet and translator Ilya Kormiltsev.
- The Readers' Sympathy Prize was awarded to: (1) Lyudmila Ulitskaya, (2) Dina Rubina and, (3) Victor Pelevin for the novel Empire V.

=== 2007—2008 ===
The third season of the award was announced on November 27, 2007. The reception of works ended on February 29, 2008.

The "long list" contained 45 works, of which 10 became finalists.

- The winners of the third season were announced on November 25, 2008, at the Pashkov House:
  - First prize — Vladimir Makanin for the novel Asan.
  - Second prize — Lyudmila Saraskina for the biography Aleksandr Solzhenitsyn.
  - Third prize — Rustam Rakhmatullin for the essay book Two Moscows, or the Metaphysics of Capitals.
- The prize For Honor and Dignity was awarded posthumously to Aleksandr Solzhenitsyn.
- The Readers' Sympathy Prize was awarded to: (1) Rustam Rakhmatullin, (2) Vladimir Kostin for the collection of short stories and tales Godovye koltsa and, (3) Lyudmila Saraskina.

=== 2008—2009 ===
The reception of works ended on February 28, 2009.

The "long list" contained 48 works, of which 13 became finalists.

- The winners of the fourth season were announced on November 26, 2009, at the Pashkov House:
  - First prize — Leonid Yuzefovich for the novel Cranes and Pygmies.
  - Second prize — Aleksandr Terekhov for the novel Stone Bridge.
  - Third prize — Leonid Zorin for the collection Skverny globus.
- The prize For Honor and Dignity was awarded to Boris Vasilyev.
- The Readers' Sympathy Prize was awarded to: (1) Andrey Baldin for the essay book Protyazheniye tochki, (2) Leonid Yuzefovich and, (3) Mariam Petrosyan for the novel The House in Which....

=== 2009—2010 ===
The reception of works ended on February 28, 2010.

With 379 works nominated, the "long list", announced on April 15, 2010, contained 37 authors of published works and 12 authors of manuscripts.

The list of finalists was announced on May 19, 2010, at the traditional Literary Dinner, and included 14 books and manuscripts.

- The winners of the fifth season were announced on November 23, 2010, at the Pashkov House:
  - First prize — Pavel Basinsky for the novel Leo Tolstoy: Escape from Paradise.
  - Second prize — Aleksandr Ilichevsky for the novel Pers.
  - Third prize — Viktor Pelevin for the novel t.
- The special prize For the Contribution to Literature was awarded posthumously to Anton Chekhov and given to the Chekhov Commission of the Russian Academy of Sciences.
- The Readers' Sympathy Prize was awarded to: (1) Victor Pelevin, (2) Yevgeny Klyuyev for the novel Andermanir shtuk and, (3) Mikhail Gigolashvili for the novel The Devil's Wheel.

=== 2010—2011 ===
The reception of works ended on February 28, 2011.

375 manuscripts and books from 42 regions of Russia and 14 countries of near and far abroad were nominated for the award, of which 40 works of 39 authors were included in the "long list" presented on April 20, 2011, in Joseph Brodsky's "Pelmeni" building in Moscow's Krasin Street.

The list of finalists was announced on May 25, 2011, at the traditional "Literary Dinner" at GUM, and included ten novels.

- Winners were announced on November 29, 2011, at the Pashkov House:
  - First prize — Mikhail Shishkin for the novel Pismovnik.
  - Second prize — Vladimir Sorokin for the novel Metel.
  - Third prize — Dmitry Bykov for the novel Ostromov, or The Magician's Apprentice.
- The Readers' Sympathy Prize was awarded to: (1) Mikhail Shishkin, (2) Dmitry Bykov and, (3) Yury Buida for the novel Blue Blood.
- The prize For Honor and Dignity was awarded to Fazil Iskander.
- The special prize For the Contribution to Literature was awarded to Peter Mayer.

=== 2011—2012 ===
The reception of works ended on February 29, 2012.

401 works were nominated, 85 of which were manuscripts.

The list of finalists was announced on May 30, 2012, and contained 14 works.

The readers' vote was held between July and November 2012.

- Winners were announced on November 27, 2012, at a ceremony at the Pashkov House:
  - First prize — Daniil Granin for the novel My Lieutenant.
  - Second prize — Aleksandr Kabakov and Yevgeni Popov for the novel Aksyonov.
  - Third prize — Marina Stepnova for the novel Women of Lazarus.
- The prize For Honor and Dignity was awarded to Daniil Granin.
- The special prize For the Contribution to Literature was awarded to Antoine Gallimard, head of the French publishing house Éditions Gallimard.
- The Readers' Sympathy Prize was awarded to: (1) Archimandrite Tikhon (Shevkunov) for the book Everyday Saints and Other Stories, (2) Maria Galina for the novel Medvedki and, (3) Marina Stepnova.

=== 2012—2013 ===
321 works from writers from Russia, Ukraine, Belarus, Kazakhstan, the United States, Spain, France, Estonia, Israel, Latvia and Germany were submitted for the award. On April 24, 2013, the "long list" was announced in the memorial museum-apartment of A. Tolstoy, which included 36 works.

- Winners were announced on November 26, 2013, at the Pashkov House:
  - First prize — Yevgeny Vodolazkin for the novel Lavr.
  - Second prize — Sergey Belyakov for the book Gumilyov syn Gumilyova.
  - Third prize — Yury Buida for the novel Vor, shpion i ubiytsa.
- The special prize For the Contribution to Literature was awarded to Yevgeny Yevtushenko.
- The Readers' Sympathy Prize was awarded to: (1) Maya Kucherskaya for Aunt Motya, (2) Sergey Belyakov and (3) Yevgeny Vodolazkin.

=== 2013—2014 ===
More than 359 works from Russia and other countries were submitted for the award. The "long list" of applicants included 29 works.

- Winners were announced on November 25, 2014, at the Pashkov House:
  - First prize — Zakhar Prilepin for the novel The Monastery.
  - Second prize — Vladimir Sorokin for the novel Telluriya.
  - Third prize — Vladimir Sharov for the novel Return to Egypt.
- The special prize For the Contribution to Literature was awarded to Leonid Zorin.
- The Readers' Sympathy Prize was awarded to: (1) Svetlana Alexievich for Vremya sekond khend, (2) Zakhar Prilepin and, (3) Aleksey Makushinsky for Parokhod v Argentinu.

=== 2014—2015 ===
More than 338 works from Russia and other countries were submitted for the award. In the "long list" of the applicants included 30 works.

- Winners were announced on December 10, 2015, at the Pashkov House:
  - First prize — Guzel Yakhina for the novel Zuleikha.
  - Second prize — Valery Zalotukha for the novel Candle.
  - Third prize — Roman Senchin for the novel Zona zatopleniya.
- The special prize For a Series of Screen Adaptations of the Classics was awarded to the All-Russia State Television and Radio Broadcasting Company.
- The Readers' Sympathy Prize was awarded to: (1) Guzel Yakhina, (2) Anna Matveyeva for Nine Nineties and, (3) Valery Zalotukha.

=== 2015—2016 ===
- Winners were announced on December 6, 2016, at the Pashkov House:
  - First prize — Leonid Yuzefovich for the novel The Winter Road.
  - Second prize — Yevgeny Vodolazkin for the novel The Aviator.
  - Third prize — Lyudmila Ulitskaya for the novel Jacob's Ladder.
- The special prize For the Contribution to Literature was awarded to the Non/fiction book fair.
- The Readers' Sympathy Prize was awarded to: (1) Lyudmila Ulitskaya, (2) Maria Galina for the novel Autochthons and, (3) Yevgeny Vodolazkin.

=== 2016—2017 ===
- Winners were announced on December 12, 2017, at the Pashkov House:
  - First prize — Lev Danilkin for the work Lenin. Pantokrator solnechnykh pylinok.
  - Second prize — Sergey Shargunov for the work Katayev. Pogonya za vechnoy vesnoy.
  - Third prize — Shamil Idiatullin for the novel Gorod Brezhnev.
- The special prize For the Contribution to Literature was awarded to Viktoriya Tokareva.
- The Readers' Sympathy Prize was awarded to: (1) Sergey Shargunov, (2) Lev Danilkin and, (3) Shamil Idiatullin.

=== 2017—2018 ===
- Winners were announced on December 5, 2018, at the Pashkov House:
  - First prize — Mariya Stepanova for the book Pamyati pamyati.
  - Second prize — Aleksandr Arkhangelsky for the novel Byuro proverki.
  - Third prize — Dmitry Bykov for the novel June.
- The special prize For the Contribution to Literature was awarded to Lyudmila Petrushevskaya.
- The Litblog prize was awarded to Yevgeniya Lisitsina for the literary Telegram channel greenlampbooks.
- The Readers' Sympathy Prize was awarded to: (1) Dmitry Bykov, (2) Oleg Yermakov for the book Raduga i Veresk and, (3) Andrey Filimonov for Retsepty sotvoreniya mira.

=== 2018—2019 ===
- Winners were announced on December 10, 2019 at the Pashkov House:
  - First prize — Oleg Lekmanov, Mikhail Sverdlov and Ilya Simanovsky for the book Venedikt Yerofeyev: The Outsider.
  - Second prize — Grigory Sluzhitel for his novel Saveliy's Days.
  - Third prize — Guzel Yakhina for her novel My Children.
- The special prize For the Contribution to Literature was awarded to Valery Popov.
- The Litblog prize was awarded to Maria Lebedeva (publications on the Mel platform and in the Prochteniye magazine)
- The Readers' Sympathy Prize was awarded to: (1) Grigory Sluzhitel for his novel Saveliy's Days, (2) Guzel Yakhina for her novel My Children and, (3) Yevgeny Vodolazkin for his novel Brisbane.

=== 2019—2020 ===
- Winners were announced on December 10, 2020 at the Electrotheatre Stanislavsky:
  - First prize — Alexander Ilichevsky for his novel Newton's Blueprint.
  - Second prize — Timur Kibirov for his novel The General and His Family.
  - Third prize — Shamil Idiatullin for his novel Lenin's Ex.
- The special prize For the Contribution to Literature was awarded to Mikhail Seslavinsky and Federal Agency for Press and Mass Media.
- The Readers' Sympathy Prize was awarded to: (1) Mikhail Elizarov for his novel Earth, (2) Dina Rubina for her novel Napoleon's Oboz and, (3) Alexei Makushinsky for his novel Suburbs of Thought. Philosophical Walk.

=== 2020-2021 ===
- Winners were announced on December 9, 2021 at the Pashkov House
  - First prize — Leonid Yuzefovich for his novel Philhellene.
  - Second prize — Maya Kucherskaya for her book Лесков: Прозёванный гений.
  - Third prize — Viktor Remizov for his book Вечная мерзлота.
- The special prize For the Contribution to Literature was awarded to the team of the V. I. Dahl State Museum of the History of Russian Literature
- The Readers' Sympathy Prize was awarded to: (1) Narine Abgaryan for her novel Simon, (2) Aleksey Polyarino for his novel Reef and, (3) Marina Stepnova for her novel Garden.

=== 2021-2022 ===
- Winners were announced on December 8, 2022 at the Pashkov House
  - First prize — Pavel Basinsky for his book Подлинная история Анны Карениной.
  - Second prize — Alexei Varlamov for his biography Imya Rozanova.
  - Third prize — Sergey Belyakov for his book Parizhskiye mal'chiki v stalinskoy Moskve.
- The special prize For the Contribution to Literature was awarded to the Institute of Applied Astronomy.
- The Readers' Sympathy Prize was awarded to: (1) Guzel Yakhina for her novel Train to Samarkand, (2) Pavel Basinsky for his Подлинная история Анны Карениной and, (3) Anna Matveyeva for her book Kazhdyye sto let.
- Sergey Belyakov won the Generation's Choice Prize. This prize was newly established in 2022 with the goal of popularising modern prose among young people and promoting interest in Russian literature.

=== 2022-2023 ===
- Winners were announced on December 5, 2023 at the Pashkov House
  - First prize — Evgenii Vodolazkin for his novel Chagin.
  - Second prize — Yury Buida for his novel The Gift of Speech.
  - Third prize — Alexei Salnikov for his novel Okulttreger.
- The special prize For the Contribution to Literature was awarded to the Sergey Filatov Foundation for Socio-Economic and Intellectual Programmes (Фонд СЭИП).
- The Readers' Sympathy Prize was awarded to: (1) Zakhar Prilepin for his book Sholokhov. Illegal, (2) Dmitriy Zakharov for his novel The Committee for the Protection of Bridges and, (3) Eduard Verkin for his two-volume book snark. snark: Chaginsk. The snow of Enceladus.
- The Generation's Choice Prize, chosen by a student jury, was awarded to Oksana Vasyakina for her book Rose.
- The '_Litblog' award was awarded to Anastasia Shevchenko for her blog Punk Editor's Notes.

=== 2023-2024 ===
- Winners were announced on December 5, 2024 at the Pashkov House
  - First prize — Alexei Varlamov for his novel Odsun.
  - Second prize — Mihail Chemiakin for his autobiography My Life: Until Exile.
  - Third prize — Zakhar Prilepin for his collection of stories Dogs and Other People.
- The special prize For the Contribution to Literature was awarded to the film company Mosfilm.
- The Readers' Sympathy Prize was awarded to: (1) Natalya Ilishkina for her novel Ulan Dalai, (2) Yana Vagner for her novel Tunnel and, (3) Darya Bobyleva for her novel The Shop is Open until Dark.
- The Generation's Choice Prize, chosen by a student jury, was awarded to Nadya Alekseeva for her book Polunoshchnitsa (en: The Midnight Office) .
- The '_Litblog' award was awarded to Yelena Neshcheret for her blog Marselizatsiya.

=== 2024-2025 ===
- Winners were announced on December 3, 2025 at the Pashkov House
- Prize for fiction — Edward Verkin for his novel Magpie on the Gallows.
- Prize for non-fiction — Zoya Boguslavskaya for her book Khalatnaya zhizn.
- The special prize For the Contribution to Literature was awarded to Radmila Mechanin.
- The Readers' Sympathy Prize was awarded to:
  - For fiction — Vera Bogdanova for her novel Seven Ways to Pickle Souls.
  - For non-fiction — Elena Levkievskaya for her book Belarusian Myths
- The Generation's Choice Prize, chosen by a student jury, was awarded to Anna Basner for her novel The Theseus Paradox and Ilya Kachergin for her collection of short prose Emergency Exit
- The '_Litblog' award was awarded to Anastasia Usova for her blog Dom Asteriya.
- The prize for Best Audiobook was awarded to the audio version of the novel Tunnel by Yana Vagner.
