= Marian Schwartz =

American translator

Marian Schwartz is an American translator of contemporary Russian literature. She is the principal English translator of the author Nina Berberova and has translated over 70 books of fiction, history, biography, and criticism into English. She is the recipient of two translation fellowships from the National Endowment for the Arts. Based in Austin, Texas, she is the former president of the American Literary Translators Association.

== Biography ==
Schwartz was born and raised in Ohio and began studying French as a child. She studied Russian and Spanish at Harvard as an undergraduate before completing a Master's degree in the Slavic Department at the University of Texas at Austin in 1975. During this time, she co-translated her first published translation, An Otherworldly Evening by Marina Tsvetaeva, with Russian professor Richard D. Sylvester. After a year in Austin working on an unpublished translation, she moved to New York to work as an assistant editor for Praeger Publishers on a series of Soviet-focused publications. Another editor at Praeger put Schwartz in touch with a newly started publishing company looking for translators. The book, a translation of the seven-essay collection Vekhi, was published as Landmarks by Karz Howard in 1977.

While perusing the Slavonic Division of the New York Public Library, Schwartz began identifying ignored and overlooked women writers that formed the basis for an anthology of 20th-century women writers, both within the Soviet Union as well as émigrée authors. This work became the foundation for her first fellowship from the NEA and the start of her career as a freelance translator.

Schwartz began publishing translations of Berberova's fiction, beginning with The Accompanist, in 1987. She continued publishing translations of major Russian authors such as Solomon Volkov's Conversations with Joseph Brodsky, Yury Olesha's Envy, Mikhail Bulgakov's The White Guard, and Oblomov by Ivan Goncharov. In 2013, her 2012 translation of Mikhail Shishkin's Maidenhair (Russian: Венерин Волос) was shortlisted for the Best Translated Book Award.. Her translation of The White Guard won the AATSEEL Best Translation into English award in 2009.

=== Translation of Anna Karenina ===
In 2015, Schwartz published her translation of Anna Karenina (Yale University Press), shortly after Rosamund Bartlett's translation appeared from Oxford University Press. The two translations were often compared in the way they addressed Tolstoy's "rough" language, with Bartlett proposing that Tolstoy was "often a clumsy and occasionally ungrammatical writer, but there is a majesty and elegance to his prose which needs to be emulated in translation wherever possible". However Schwartz's point, as reviewer M. Gessen described, was that "Tolstoy's writing is indeed remarkable for its purposeful roughness, the use of repetition, and the obsessive breaking of clichés to force the reader to consider the meaning of each word and phrase". In her introduction to the text, Schwartz notes:

English translators have tended to view Tolstoy's sometimes radical choices as 'mistakes' to be corrected, as if Tolstoy, had he known better, or cared more, would not have broken basic rules of literary language.

== Selected bibliography ==
- Berberova, Nina (1987), The Accompanist, London: Collins, ISBN 9780002231602
- Berberova, Nina (1989), The Revolt, London: Collins, ISBN 9780002234375
- Berberova, Nina (1991), The Tattered Cloak and Other Stories, New York, NY: Knopf, ISBN 9780679402817
- Berberova, Nina (1998), The Ladies from St. Petersburg: Three Novellas, New York, NY: New Directions, ISBN 9780811213776
- Berberova, Nina (1999), The Book of Happiness, New York, NY: New Directions, ISBN 9780811214018
- Berberova, Nina (1999), Cape of Storms, New York, NY: New Directions, ISBN 9780811214162
- Berberova, Nina (2001), The Billancourt Tales, New York, NY: New Directions, ISBN 9780811214810
- Berberova, Nina (2005), Moura: The Dangerous Life of the Baroness Budberg, translated by Sylvester, Richard; Schwartz, Marian, New York, NY: New York Review Books, ISBN 9781590171370
- Berberova, Nina (2021), The Last and the First, London: Pushkin Press, ISBN 9781782276975
- Bulgakov, Mikhail (2008), White Guard, New Haven: Yale University Press, ISBN 9780300151459
- Dashkova, Polina (2017), Madness Treads Lightly, Seattle: AmazonCrossing, ISBN 9781477823460
- Erofeev, Venedikt (2014), Walpurgis Night, or the Steps of the Commander, New Haven: Yale University Press, ISBN 9780300207057
- Gelasimov, Andrei (2011), Thirst, Las Vegas: AmazonCrossing, ISBN 9781611090697
- Gelasimov, Andrei (2013), The Lying Year, Las Vegas: AmazonCrossing, ISBN 9781611090710
- Gelasimov, Andrei (2015), Calligraphy Lesson: The Collected Stories, translated by Bashkatova, Mariya; Maizell, Sylvia; Schwartz, Marian; Shtutin, Leo, Dallas, Texas: Deep Vellum, ISBN 9781941920039
- Gelasimov, Andrei (2017), Into the Thickening Fog, Seattle: AmazonCrossing, ISBN 9781503940819
- Goncharov, Ivan (2008), Oblomov, New York, NY: Seven Stories Press, ISBN 9781583228401
- Gonzalez Gallego, Ruben David (2006), White on Black, Orlando: Harcourt, ISBN 9780156032353
- Lermontov, Mikhail (2004), A Hero of Our Time, New York, NY: Modern Library, ISBN 9780812970760
- Lotman, Yuri Mikhailovich; Pogosjan, Jelena (2014), High Society Dinners: Dining in Tsarist Russia, Totnes, Devon: Prospect Books, ISBN 9781903018989
- Mamleyev, Yuri (2014), The Sublimes, Paris: Haute Culture Books, ISBN 9789198115710
- Megre, Vladimir (10 March 2015), Parables, translated by Downing, Susan; Schwartz, Marian, Ringing Cedars Publishing House, ISBN 9785906381552
- Olesha, Yuri (2004), Envy, New York, NY: New York Review Books, ISBN 9781590170861
- Panyushkin, Valery (2011), 12 Who Don't Agree, New York, NY: Europa Editions, ISBN 9781609450106
- Peskov, Vasily (1994), Lost in the Taiga: One Russian Family's Fifty-Year Struggle for Survival and Religious Freedom in the Siberian Wilderness, New York, NY: Doubleday, ISBN 9780385472098
- Radzinsky, Edvard (1992), The Last Tsar: The Life and Death of Nicholas II, New York, NY: Doubleday, ISBN 9780385423717
- Sarabianov, Dmitri V.; Adaskina, Natalia (1990), Liubov Popova, New York, NY: Harry N. Abrams, ISBN 9780810937017
- Slavnikova, Olga (2010), 2017, New York, NY: Overlook, ISBN 9781590203095
- Slavnikova, Olga (2019), The Man Who Couldn't Die, New York, NY: Columbia University Press, ISBN 9780231185950
- Shishkin, Mikhail (2012), Maidenhair, Rochester, NY: Open Letter Books, ISBN 9781934824368
- Solzhenitsyn, Aleksandr (2017), March 1917: The Red Wheel, Node III, vol. 1, Notre Dame, Indiana: University of Notre Dame Press, ISBN 9780268102678
- Solzhenitsyn, Aleksandr (2019), March 1917: The Red Wheel, Node III, vol. 2, Notre Dame, Indiana: University of Notre Dame Press, ISBN 9780268106850
- Solzhenitsyn, Aleksandr (2021), March 1917: The Red Wheel, Node III, vol. 3, Notre Dame, Indiana: University of Notre Dame Press, ISBN 9780268201708
- Steinberg, Mark (2001), Voices of Revolution, 1917, New Haven: Yale University Press, ISBN 9780300101690
- Tolstoy, Leo (2014), Anna Karenina, New Haven: Yale University Press, ISBN 9780300203943
- Vodolazkin, Eugene (2022), Brisbane, Walden, NY: Plough, ISBN 9781636080451
- Volkov, Solomon (1998), Conversations with Joseph Brodsky: A Poet's Journey Through the Twentieth Century, New York, NY: Free Press, ISBN 9780684835723
- Wilke, Daria (2015), Playing a Part, New York, NY: Arthur A. Levine Books, ISBN 9780545726078
- Yuzefovich, Leonid (2013), Harlequin's Costume, London: Glagoslav Publications, ISBN 9781782670308
- Yuzefovich, Leonid (2018), Horsemen of the Sands, Brooklyn, NY: Archipelago Books, ISBN 9781939810090
