= Maria Galina =

Russian writer (born 1958)

- Мария Галина
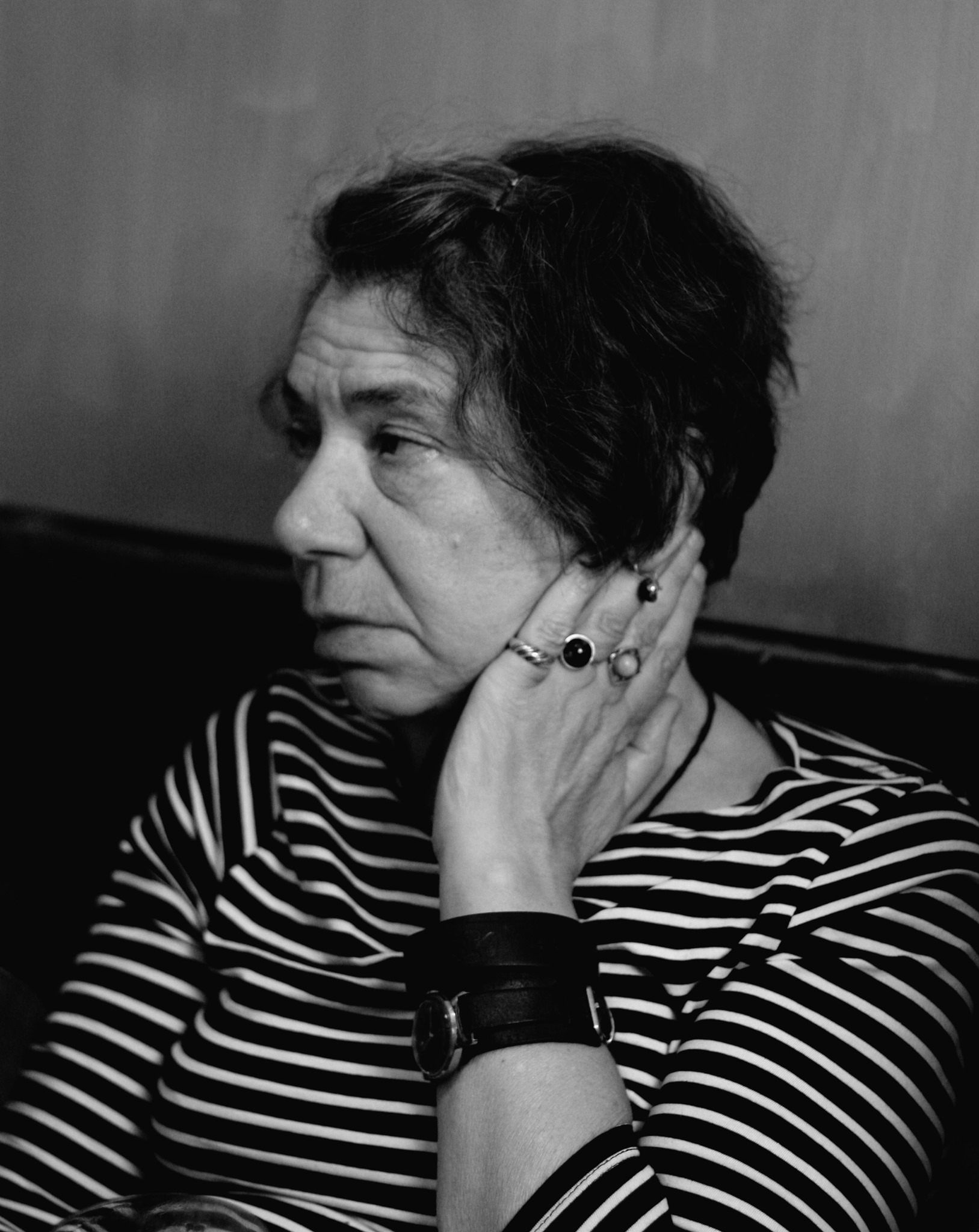
- Galina in 2022
- Born: November 10, 1958 (age 67); Kalinin, Soviet Union
- Education: Odesa University
- Occupation: Writer
- Writing career
- Language: Russian
- Notable awards: Moscow Account

Maria Galina (Russian: Мария Семёновна Галина; born 10 November 1958) is a Russian-language writer of Ukrainian origin. She was born in Kalinin (now the city of Tver) and studied marine biology in Odessa. She lived in Bergen for a while, studying salmon.

She started publishing fiction in the 1990s under the pseudonym Maxim Golitsyn. She has since published novels under her own name as well. Two of her novels, Little Boondock and Mole-Crickets, were nominated for the Big Book Award in 2009 and 2012. She is also a prize-winning poet and literary critic, writing regular columns for the literary journal Novy Mir.

Her novel Iramifictions was translated into English by Amanda Love Darragh and published under the Glas New Russian Writing imprint. Her translated poetry has appeared The Cafe Review and Matter. She has mentioned writers such as Dmitry Bykov, Dmitry Gromov, Oleg Ladyzhensky, Oleg Divov, Mikhail Uspensky, and Yevgeny Lukin among her inspirations.

Having lived in Moscow for over thirty years, she moved to Ukraine and now lives and works in Odessa.
