= National Union of Bibliophiles =

The National Union of Bibliophiles
- Formation: 2010
- Type: Non-governmental organization
- Location: Moscow
- Members: 100 (approx.)
- Activities: Research & publications, lectures & events, exhibitions
- Head of the Partnership Board: Mikhail Seslavinsky
- Executive Director: Igor Bykov
- Executive Secretary: Ludmila Larionova
- Website: http://nsb-bibliophile.ru/

The National Union of Bibliophiles (NUB), full name Non-Commercial Partnership “The National Union of Bibliophiles” (Russian: Некоммерческое партнерство “Национальный союз библиофилов”), is a public organisation, an association of bibliophiles of the Russian Federation. It was formed as legal entity in 2010.

== History of foundation ==
NUB’s history starts in 1990, when the Organisation of Russian Bibliophiles, ORB (Russian: Организация российских библиофилов, ОРБ) was chartered, which had united on an informal basis around 100 lovers of antique rare books. A successful 20-years period of the life of ORB (it organised more than 10 exhibitions and issued over 200 printed works) was finalized in 2010. A need for substantial changes in the structure and activities of the organisation was the key driver for the bibliophiles’ decision to set up a new association in the form of a legal entity – the Non-Commercial Partnership “The National Union of Bibliophiles”, which effectively has become a successor to the Organisation of Russian Bibliophiles. The founders’ meeting of NUB was held on 22 October 2010 in Moscow at the State Literature Museum.

On 28 January 2011 the first general participants meeting of NUB was held in Moscow, where the Partnership Board comprising five members was formed by secret ballot. A prominent Moscow bibliophile and researcher in book culture, Head of the Federal Agency for Press and Mass Communications of the Russian Federation Mikhail Vadimovich Seslavinsky was elected Head of the Partnership Board.

== Membership ==
Currently there are about 100 members in NUB. New candidates may be admitted to membership in the partnership once a year by the general meeting of participants of NUB, provided that each candidate need to obtain and present three reference letters from the members of NUB and further, in order to be eligible for the membership, must satisfy one of the following criteria:

- have its own collection of books of bibliophile type;
- have not less than 10 research works (own publications) in book research sphere;
- have not less than 5-year experience of work in the antiquarian and bibliopole trade.

Among the members of NUB there are prominent scientists, journalists and writers including Pavel Gusev - Chief Editor of newspaper “Moskovsky komsomolets” (Russian: Московский комсомолец) and Head of Moscow Union of Journalists, Alexander Sigov, - Academician of Russian Academy of Sciences, Konstantin Ernst – producer, Director General of the Channel One (Russian: Первый канал), Villy Petritsky – culturologist, one of the patriarchs of Russian bibliophilia, Lev Mnukhin – researcher of Marina Tsvetaeva’s work and history of Russian emigration, Yuri Rostovtsev - Chief Editor of the monthly “Studenchesky meridian” (“Student meridian”) (Russian: Студенческий меридиан), Olga Tarakanova – professor, author of the only Russian textbook “Antiquarian book”, Mikhail Afanasyev – director of the State Historical Public Library of Russia and others.

== Activities ==
NUB’s activities are dedicated to bringing together people interested in book collecting, aggregation and dissemination of information about Russian bibliophile movement, extending the boundaries of the Russian book culture and facilitation of private book collecting practices.

Under the aegis of NUB there were organised International Scientific Conferences “Bibliophilia and Private Collections” (2011, 2013), various bibliophilic printed works of limited edition have been issued (monographs, magazines, sessions’ booklets, exhibition catalogues, albums etc.), thematic exhibitions have been staged.

The partnership organises and holds annual meetings of its members, at which it arranges round table discussions dedicated to various historical events, including the 400th anniversary of the House of Romanov (2013), the 200th anniversary of the Patriotic War of 1812 (2012), the 125th anniversary of the birth of Anna Akhmatova (2014) etc.

Starting from 2013 NUB, jointly with the Russian bibliophilic magazine "Pro knigi" ("About books") (Russian: Про книги. Журнал библиофила), presents an annual award in the name of N. Smirnov-Sokolsky for the personal contributions to the development of Russian bibliophilia.

NUB participates in the work of national and international book fairs and exhibitions, where it distributes scientific and bibliophilic printed works of limited editions.

== Clubs ==
Members of the partnership are involved in the work of more than 10 bibliophile clubs located at various cities of Russia, Ukraine and Israel, where they are engaged in the research activities in the area of theory and history of rare books.

In Moscow the club “Bibliophilic Hive” (Russian: Библиофильский улей) (Hosted by M.V.Seslavinsky) is in active operation.

The subject matters of the meetings are dedicated to the history of Russian bibliophilia (including outstanding book collections of the past), art of the book and book cover. Among the permanent participants of the meetings, apart from the bibliophiles, are representatives of libraries and museums, antique traders and collectors. Some meetings are arranged jointly with the largest Russian museums and libraries including the State Literature Museum, the Russian State Library, the State Historical Public Library of Russia, the National Pushkin Museum, Anna Akhmatova Museum at Fountain House (Fontanny Dom) and others.

In 2012-2013 for the first time in the history of Russian bibliophilia there were organised joint sessions of the bibliophilic clubs of Moscow and Saint-Petersburg ).

Each session is accompanied by a daylong exhibition of rare printed works from the collections of the participants of the club. During 2011-2013 the sessions’ results were described in the illustrative booklets (20-45 pages each) containing the principal theses of presentations made at the meetings, and from 2014 the club’s magazine “Vestnik Bibliophila” (“Herald of the Bibliophile”) (Russian: Вестник библиофила) is published.
