= Laurus (novel) =

2012 novel by Eugene Vodolazkin

- Author: Eugene Vodolazkin
- Original title: Лавр

Laurus is a 2012 Russian novel by Eugene Vodolazkin set in the fifteenth and sixteenth centuries. It won the Big Book Award and the Yasnaya Polyana Book Award. According to Neil Griffiths's list for The Guardian, it is one of ten best world novels about God. It was translated into English in 2015 by Lisa C. Hayden.

The novel is set in medieval Russia. The main character, Arseny, a healer with medicinal skills, was raised by his grandfather Christopher, a learned man and herbalist. Arseny's secret beloved, Ustina, dies during childbirth, and their son perishes in the womb. Devastated that Ustina died because of him and without receiving communion, Arseny seeks to atone for his sin and pray for her soul, dedicating his life to her. With unwavering love for Ustina, throughout his long life, he becomes a wandering herbalist healing people, a holy fool taking on his beloved’s name, a pilgrim traveling to Jerusalem and back, and eventually a monk, later taking the schema and the name Laurus.
