= Mikhail Shishkin (writer) =

Russian-Swiss writer

- Михаил Шишкин
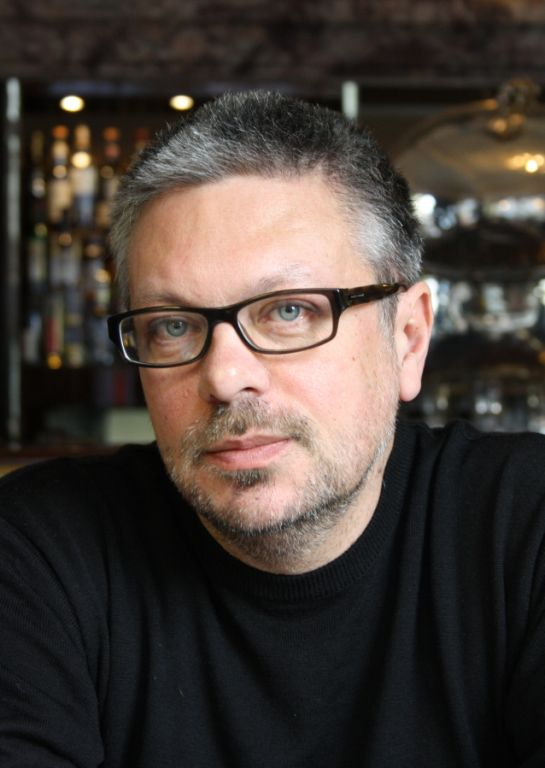
- Shishkin in 2010
- Born: 18 January 1961 (age 65); Moscow, Russian SFSR
- Citizenship: Russia, Switzerland
- Occupation: writer
- Writing career
- Genres: Fiction, non-fiction
- Notable awards: Russian Booker Prize (2000), Russian National Bestseller Award (2005) and Big Book Prize (2006, 2010)
- Website: mikhailshishkin.com

Mikhail Pavlovich Shishkin (Russian: Михаил Павлович Шишкин, born 18 January 1961) is a Russian-Swiss writer and the only author to have won the Russian Booker Prize (2000), the Russian National Bestseller (2005), and the Big Book Prize (2010). His books have been translated into 30 languages. He also writes in German.

== Biography ==
Mikhail Shishkin was born in Moscow on 18 January 1961 to Irina Georgievna Shishkina, a Russian literature teacher, and Pavel Mikhailovich Shishkin, an engineer constructor. In 1977 Shishkin graduated from high school #59 in Arbat district in the centre of Moscow.

After graduation from Moscow State Pedagogical Institute, where Shishkin studied German and English, he worked as a road worker, street sweeper, journalist, school teacher, and translator.

In 1995, Shishkin moved to Switzerland for family reasons. He worked in Zürich within the Immigration Department and specifically with refugees as a Russian and German translator. He has Swiss citizenship.

Shishkin was invited as a guest professor to Washington and Lee University in Lexington (VA) (fall semester 2007 and 2009). Since 2011 Shishkin has lived with his family in a small village near Basel.

Shishkin was a guest of the DAAD Artists-in-Berlin Program in Berlin from 2012 to 2013. He is a frequent guest lecturer at universities and cultural foundations across Europe and the United States and a frequent speaker on television and radio in many countries.

Shishkin has published articles in The New York Times, The Wall Street Journal, The Guardian, Le Monde, The Independent, and other media outlets.

In 2024, Mikhail Shishkin co-founded the Dar Literary Prize together with Swiss Slavists.

== Literary career ==
His first novel One Night Befalls Us All (Omnes una manet nox) / Всех ожидает одна ночь also appeared the same year in Znamya. Later this novel was published under the title Larionov's Reminiscences / Записки Ларионова. His first publications attracted the attention of literary critics and Shishkin received the Prize for the Best Debut of the Year. Fred Kaplan called Mikhail Shishkin in Boston Globe "one of Moscow´s most wellregarded young novelists".

In 1999, Znamya published Shishkin's breakthrough novel The Taking of Izmail. In 2000 the novel won Russian Booker Prize for the best Russian novel of the year. Nezavisimaya gazeta wrote: "A beautiful, powerful and fascinating book which will become a milestone not only in the history of Russian literature but in the development of Russian self-awareness."

His experience of moving to a new country inspired Shishkin to write Russian Switzerland / Русская Швейцария, a nonfiction literary-historical guide. In 1999 it was published by PANO-Verlag in Zürich (in Russian). This book was translated into German and French and received the award of Canton of Zürich (Werkbeitrag des Kantons Zürich 2000).

In 2002, Limmat Verlag in Zürich released Shishkin's book written in German Montreux-Missolunghi-Astapowo: Tracing Byron and Tolstoy, a literary walk from Lake Geneva to the Bern Alps which received the literary award of Zürich (Werkjahr der Stadt Zürich 2002).

In 2005, Shishkin published the novel Maidenhair, receiving the National Bestseller award 2005 and Big Book Award 2006. Maya Kucherskaya, a critic, described Shishkin's novel in the following manner: "Maidenhair is a great novel about a word and a language that becomes soft and obedient in the hands of a Master. It can create any other reality which will be more stunning and credible that the real world. The gap between a word and a fact, between reality and its translation to the human language is a real hotbed of internal tension in the novel". Moscow News stated, "The writer tries to connect the achievements of Western literature of the XX century and its love for verbal technique with the humanistic nature of Russian literature. His new novel speaks about the most important subject: how to defeat death with love."

The novel in the English translation published by Open Letter in 2012 was highly praised by critics. Daniel Kalder in The Dallas Morning News stated: "In short, Maidenhair is the best post-Soviet Russian novel I have read. Simply put, it is true literature, a phenomenon we encounter too rarely in any language." Boris Dralyuk wrote in The Times Literary Supplement that "Shishkin's prodigious erudition, lapidary phrasing and penchant for generic play are conspicuous components of his art...These characteristics do indeed ally him with Nabokov, as does his faith in the power of the written word: "The story is the hand, and you're the mitt. Stories change you, like mitts. You have to understand that stories are living beings"."

In 2010, the novel Pismovnik (Letter-Book) was published by AST in Moscow. It won him the main Russian literary Prize "Bolshaya kniga" - the author received the main award of the Big Book Prize (2011) and won the reader choice vote.

The English translation of Pismovnik was published under the title The Light and the Dark by Quercus in 2013. The Wall Street Journal praised the author: "Mr. Shishkin has created a bewitching potion of reality and fantasy, of history and fable, and of lonely need and joyful consolation." Monocle stated: "His latest novel, The Light and the Dark, in its brilliant translation, is striking proof that great Russian literature didn't die with Dostoevsky. The prose is lapidary, the evocation of history and the present razor-sharp. A wonderful book: it is filled with wonder." The Sunday Times called Shishkin "a writer with a compelling sense of the skull beneath the skin." The New York Times Book Review described Shishkin as "a proud sentimentalist. (The gold medal for synchronized cynicism and sentimentalism will always go to Russia.)" The Guardian wrote: "Both novels attempt to represent multifaceted reality, and there is sometimes an unbearable intensity as the metaphors sprout and writhe. The breathlessness of Maidenhair becomes, in The Light and the Dark, a more measured brilliance; the urgency of Shishkin's mission is undimmed. "Unless life is transformed into words, there will be nothing." ...Shishkin's writing is both philosophically ambitious and sensually specific."

In 2015, Deep Vellum Publishing released Calligraphy Lesson: The Collected Stories. Michael Orthofer in Complete Review called the book "an ideal introduction to Shishkin and his work". According to critic Jacob Kiernan (New Orleans Review),"the collection consists of artfully constructed, empathetic tales of people living in the midst cyclonic time." Caroline North wrote in Dallas Observer: "Though the stories in CALLIGRAPHY LESSON are steeped in Russian history and have a distinctly Russian tone, many of the philosophical quandaries they engage extend beyond language and borders ― they are universal problems, and this translation boldly and successfully takes them on."

Translations of the works of Mikhail Shishkin have received numerous international awards, including the 2007 Grinzane Cavour Prize (Italy) for Capelvenere (Italian translation of Maidenhair), the French literary prize for the best foreign book of the year 2005 - Prix du Meilleur Livre Étranger (Essay) in Paris and The International Berlin Prize (Haus der Kulturen der Welt) International Literature Award for the best foreign novel of the year 2011 for Venushaar (German translation of Maidenhair).

Asked in an interview about all his prizes, Shishkin replied: "No award has ever made a book better." Shishkin sees his critical accomplishment as "proof that I was right not to compromise."

In 2019, Shishkin released a digital Book Dead Souls, living Noses. An Introduction into the Russian Culture History (in German), a collection of 16 essays and 400 comments with pictures, music and videos. NZZ praised this digital project as "a new level in the development of book culture". Shishkin called this book in an interview "my very personal encyclopedia of the Russian Culture".

All Shishkins's novels have been adapted into theater dramas in Russia.

== Literary style ==
His prose has been praised, e.g., "Shishkin's language is wonderfully lucid and concise. Without sounding archaic, it reaches over the heads of Tolstoy and Dostoevsky (whose relationship with the Russian language was often uneasy) to the tradition of Pushkin." He says, "Bunin taught me not to compromise, and to go on believing in myself. Chekhov passed on his sense of humanity – that there can't be any wholly negative characters in your text. And from Tolstoy I learned not to be afraid of being naïve."

Shishkin compares the writing process with a blood transfusion: "I am sharing the most important essence of life with my reader. But we need to have the same blood type."

== Political views ==
Shishkin openly opposes the current Russian government and criticizes sharply Vladimir Putin's domestic and foreign policies, including the annexation of Crimea in 2014.

In 2013, he pulled out of representing Russia at the Book Expo in the United States. Mikhail Shishkin declared in his Open Letter:

A country where power has been seized by a corrupt, criminal regime, where the state is a pyramid of thieves, where elections have become farce, where courts serve the authorities, not the law, where there are political prisoners, where state television has become a prostitute, where packs of impostors pass insane laws that are returning everyone to the Middle Ages – such a country cannot be my Russia. I want to and will represent another Russia, my Russia, a country free of impostors, a country with a state structure that defends the right of the individual, not the right to corruption, a country with a free media, free elections, and free people.

He opposed the 2022 Russian invasion of Ukraine, writing in The Guardian that "Putin is committing monstrous crimes in the name of my people, my country, and me" and saying that "in Putin’s Russia it’s impossible to breathe. The stench from the policeman’s boot is too strong."

As a result of this on 21 March 2025 Ministry of Justice (Russia) put Shishkin into the category "foreign agent" using the notorious Russian foreign agent law.

== Awards and honors ==
- 1993 the Prize for the best Debut of the Year
- 2000 Russian Booker Prize, The Taking of Izmail
- 2005 Prix du Meilleur Livre Étranger (Essay)
- 2006 Big Book Award, Maidenhair
- 2006 National Bestseller Literary Prize, Maidenhair
- 2007 Grinzane Cavour Prize, Capelvenere (Italian translation of Maidenhair)
- 2011 Big Book Award, Pismovnik
- 2011 International Literature Award, Maidenhair (German translation)
- 2013 Best Translated Book Award, shortlist, Maidenhair
- 2022 Premio Strega Europeo in Italy for Pismownik (Punto di fuga, Italian translation of The Light and the Dark).

== Selected bibliography ==
Fiction

- Calligraphy Lesson/ Урок каллиграфии, short story (1993)
- One Night Befalls Us All (Omnes una manet nox) / Всех ожидает одна ночь, novel (1993)
- Blind Musician / Слепой музыкант, novella (1994)
- The Taking of Izmail / Взятие Измаила, novel (1999)
- Saved language / Спасенный язык, essay (2001)
- Maidenhair / Венерин Волос, novel (2005)
- Pismovnik ("Letter Book") / Письмовник, novel (2010)
- The Half-Belt Overcoat / Пальто с хлястиком, essays and short stories (2017)

Non-Fiction

- Russian Switzerland / Русская Швейцария literary and historical guidebook (1999)
- A letter on the snow. Three essays. Robert Walser, James Joyce, Vladimir Sharov / Буква на снегу. Три эссе. Роберт Вальзер, Джеймс Джойс, Владимир Шаров (2019)
- My classics. Essays on Russian literature (Мои. Эссе о русской литературе.), BAbook, 2024, ISBN 978-1-965-36901-2

Books written in German

- Montreux-Missolunghi-Astapovo, Tracing Byron and Tolstoy, a literary walk from Lake Geneva to the Bern Alps / Montreux-Missolunghi-Astapowo, Auf den Spuren von Byron und Tolstoi, an essay collection, in German (2002).
- Dead Souls, living Noses. An Introduction into the Russian Culture History / Tote Seelen, lebende Nasen. Eine Einführung in die russische Kulturgeschichte. A multimedia digital book. Petit-Lucelle Publishing House, Kleinlützel, 2019, ISBN 978-3-033-07082-0.
- War or Peace. Russia and the West. An Approach / Frieden oder Krieg. Russland und der Westen – eine Annäherung. Together with Fritz Pleitgen. Ludwig Verlag, München 2019, ISBN 978-3-453-28117-2.

English Translations

- Maidenhair / Венерин Волос, Open Letter, 2012, tr. Marian Schwartz. ISBN 978-1-934824-36-8
- The Light and the Dark / Письмовник, Quercus, 2013, tr. Andrew Bromfield. ISBN 978-1-623650-46-9
- Calligraphy Lesson: The Collected Stories, Deep Vellum, 2015, tr. Marian Schwartz, Leo Shtutin, Mariya Bashkatova, Sylvia Maizell. ISBN 978-1-941920-03-9
- Tolstoy and the Death: in Tolstoy and Spirituality, Academic Studies Press, 2018, tr. Marian Schwartz. ISBN 978-1618118707
- My Russia: War or Peace? Quercus Publishing, 28 May 2024, tr. Gesche Ipsen, ISBN 978-1529427783

== Literature ==
- M. A. Orthofer. The Complete Review Guide to Contemporary World Fiction. — Columbia University Press, 2016. — 366/571 p. — ISBN 9780231518505. — ISBN 0231518501.
- (in Russian) Iconic Names of Russian Literature: Mikhail Shishkin. A collection of 35 essays on his writing, a collective monograph. Krakow, Jagiellonian University, 2017. — ISBN 978-83-65432-70-4.
