= Eugene Vodolazkin =

Russian writer

Eugene Germanovich Vodolazkin
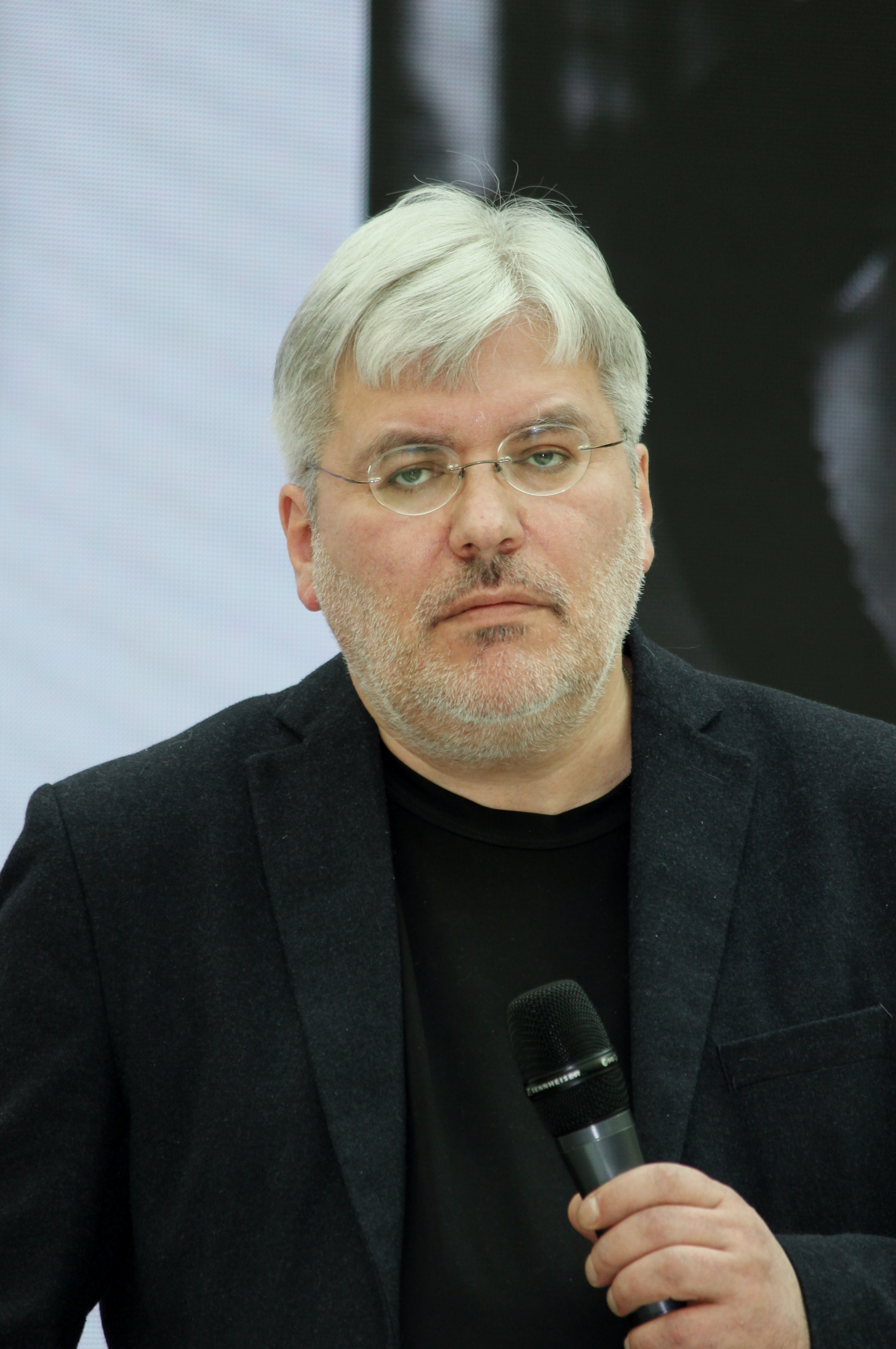
- Born: 21 February 1964 (age 62); Kyiv, Ukrainian SSR, Soviet Union (now Ukraine)
- Education: Kyiv University
- Occupation: Novelist
- Writing career
- Language: Russian, English

Eugene Germanovich Vodolazkin (Евгений Германович Водолазкин) is a Russian-Ukrainian scholar and author. Born in Kiev in 1964, he graduated from the Philological Department of Kiev University in 1986. In the same year, he entered graduate school at the Pushkin House in the department of Old Russian literature under Dmitry Likhachov. In 1990, he defended his graduate thesis 'On the Translation of the "Chronicle of George Hamartolos"'.

Vodolazkin has been awarded fellowships from the Toepfer Foundation and Alexander von Humboldt Foundation, and has won the Solzhenitsyn Prize in 2019. His novel Laurus (Лавр) won the Russian Big Book Award as well as the Yasnaya Polyana Literary Award. It is one of the ten best world novels about God by The Guardian version. He has published in the Christian journals First Things and Plough. His novels have been translated into several languages.

== Personal life ==
Vodolazkin was born in 1964 in Kiev in Soviet Ukraine. Though he is private about his childhood, he attended a school that focused on both Ukrainian and English languages, from which he graduated in 1981. He went on to attend Kiev University, where he studied philology, and the Pushkin House (known at the time as the Institute of Russian Literature). The Pushkin House is where Vodolazkin met his wife, Tatiana Robertovna Rudi. He defended his thesis in 1990, and his examiner Dmitry Likhachov offered him a faculty position. Vodolazkin lives in St. Petersburg.

== Works ==
=== Scholarly publications ===
- World History in Literature of Ancient Russia (based on XI - XV materials)
- Dmitry Likhachov and his Epoch: Memoirs, Essays, Documents, Photographs

=== Novels ===
- The Abduction of Europa (2005)
- Solovyov and Larionov (2009), Andrei Bely Prize, Big Book Award shortlist
- Laurus (2012), Yasnaya Polyana Literary Award, 21st century category, win; Big Book Award, first prize
- The Aviator (2015), Big Book Award, second prize
- House and Island: Language Tool (2015)
- Brisbane (2018)
- The Pet Market (2019)
- Go Dauntlessly (2020)
- The History of the Island(2020)
- Sister of Four (2020)
