= Zuleikha (novel) =

2015 novel by Guzel Yakhina

- Author: Guzel Yakhina
- Original title: Зулейха открывает глаза
- Translator: Lisa C. Hayden (English)
- Language: Russian
- Publisher: AST Yelena Shubina
- Publication date: 2015
- Publication place: Russia
- English publication date: 2019
- Media type: Print (Hardback)
- ISBN: 978-1-786-07349-5

Zuleikha (Russian: Зулейха́ открыва́ет глаза́, romanized: Zuleykha otkryvayet glaza, lit. 'Zuleykha Opens Her Eyes') is a debut novel written in 2015 by the Russian author Guzel Yakhina. It describes the lives of various people, including the titular protagonist, struggling to survive in exile in Siberia from 1930 to 1946.

The book won the Yasnaya Polyana Literary Award and the Big Book Award in 2015. It has been translated into twenty-one languages.

The first sentence of the novel is "Zuleihka opens her eyes." This sentence in the novel serves as a leitmotiv. Whenever Zuleihka begins to notice or learn something new about herself or her surroundings, the sentence "Zuleihka opens her eyes" is repeated multiple times throughout the novel. The novel is considered a bildungsroman because it deals with Zuleihka's personal transformations as a result of the life experiences she gains, and her journey of becoming a strong woman by achieving freedom.

== Plot summary ==
In 1930, Zuleikha lives in a small Tatar village in the Soviet Union with her husband Murtaza and mother-in-law. Her husband treats her terribly and favors her mother-in-law heavily. Her mother-in-law is extremely ungrateful for everything Zuleikha does for her. Zuleikha is considered a failure because she has attempted to have four different children, but all have died. As part of the dekulakization campaign, her husband is executed by Ignatov for refusing to leave. She is then exiled to Siberia with him while they go on a lengthy journey to a new "Settlement". Ignatov is not interested in Zuleikha and has a woman of his own at home but gets trapped in this just as much as Zuleikha. After an extremely long waiting time and train ride, where some people managed to escape, they arrived at the port. The port takes them down the river to their settlement and sinks along the way. The result is many who were trapped on the boat and locked up ended up drowning. Zuleikha tries to save them, almost drowning herself, but Ignatov saves her. This settlement is nothing more than some forest with little to no supplies. The remainder of the story occurs at this settlement and develops into an actual settlement. The first winter is harsh, and many die, but they survive thanks to Ignatov's leadership and Zuleikha's hunting skills. Many recruits arrive in the spring and don't survive the harsh winter.

The novel is a historical fiction inspired by stories told to the author by her grandmother, although actual incidents in the novel are based on other people's memoirs. The fictional setting of the novel is based on the labor settlement Pit-Gorodok in Severo-Yeniseysky District, where the author's grandmother was exiled as a child along with her parents.

== Adaptions ==
A Russian language, eight-episode television mini-series, Zuleikha Opens Her Eyes (Russian: Зулейха открывает глаза, romanized: Zuleikha otkrivaet glaza), premiered on the TV channel Russia 1 in 2020. The series stars Chulpan Khamatova, Evgeniy Morozov, and Sergey Makovetskiy and was directed by Egor Anashkin. The show received unexpectedly broad acclaim from both Russophone and Anglophone publications.
