= Yana Vagner =

Russian writer (born 1973)

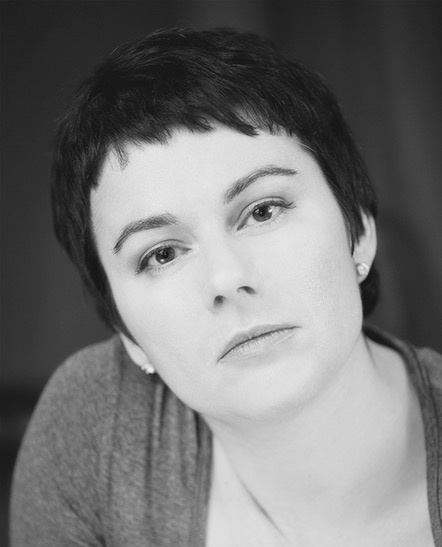
Vagner in 2012

Yana Mikhailovna Vagner (Russian: Яна Михайловна Вагнер; born 8 October 1973, in Moscow) is a Russian writer and journalist, best known for her novel Vongozero (2011), which was adapted into the Russian series To the Lake on Netflix.

== Biography ==
Yana Mikhailovna Vagner was born on 8 October 1973 in Moscow into a bilingual family. Her mother, whose maiden name is Vagner, moved to the Soviet Union from Czechoslovakia in the 1960s to study Russian language and literature. Although her mother settled in the Soviet Union, working as a translator for All-Union Radio, Yana spent every summer holiday in the Czech part of Czechoslovakia with her maternal grandparents and because of this she speaks Czech.

In 1994, she graduated from the Russian State University for the Humanities and worked as a Czech and English translator. For more than ten years she worked in transport logistics.

Since 2011 she has lived in the Moscow Region, near Zvenigorod with her husband and son.

== Career ==
Her first publication was in the collection Lis'ya Chestnost' in 2010 along with other authors, including Marta Ketro and Dmitriy Vodennikov.

Her first novel, Vongozero, was published in 2011. The novel was nominated for the Novaya Slovesnost' prize (Новая Словесность) and the National Bestseller Prize. It has been translated into eleven languages. In Autumn 2019, the platform Premier released a television series, To the Lake, based on the novel. It was directed by Pavel Kostomarov.

A sequel to Vongozero, Zhivye Lyudi, was published in 2013 and longlisted for the National Bestseller prize.

Her third novel, Kto Ne Spryatalsya, was released in 2017, and edited by Yelena Shubina. It is a locked-room mystery. The novel was nominated the Big Book prize, the National Bestseller prize and the Yasnaya Polyana Literary Award.

In 2024, she published her fourth novel Tunnel.

== Works ==
=== Novels ===
- Vongozero (2011)
- Zhivye Lyudi (2013)
- Kto Ne Spryatalsya (2017)
- Tunnel (2024)
