= Pavel Basinsky =

Soviet writer and literary critic (born 1961)

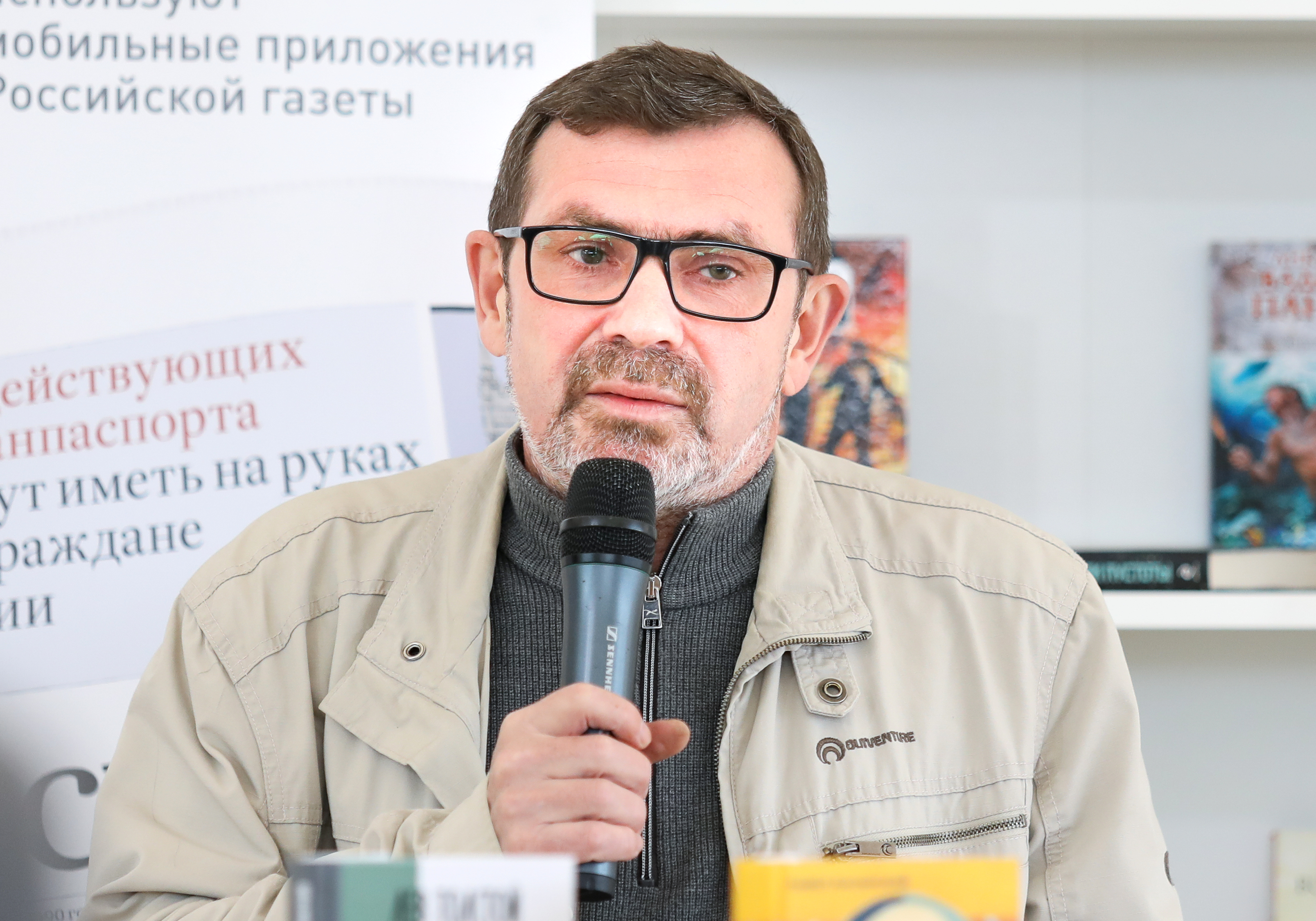
- Pavel Basinsky at the Red Square Book Festival-2017.
- Born: Па́вел Вале́рьевич Баси́нский; 14 October 1961 (age 64); Forlovo, Volgograd Oblast, RSFSR
- Education: Saratov State University; Gorky Literature Institute
- Occupation: Writer
- Writing career
- Language: Russian
- Period: 1981–present
- Genres: Novel, essay
- Notable awards: State Prize of the Russian Federation
- Literary movement: Realism
- Website: basinsky.ru

Pavel Valeryevich Basinsky (Russian: Па́вел Вале́рьевич Баси́нский; born 14 October 1961, in Frolovo, Volgograd Oblast) is a Russian writer and literary critic. Member of the Union of Russian Writers (1993), academician of the Academy of Russian Literature (Russian: Академия российской словесности)(1997). Member of the permanent jury of the Solzhenitsyn Prize (1997). The author of the most complete uncensored biography of Maxim Gorky, published in 2005. Laureate of the State Prize of the Russian Federation (2018).

== Biography ==
He studied at the Department of Foreign Languages at Saratov State University, graduated from the Maxim Gorky Literature Institute (1986; workshop of criticism of Vsevolod Surganov) and graduate school with him, defended his dissertation on "Early Gorky and Nietzsche: the worldviews of the works of M. Gorky 1892–1905." (1998). He works at the Literary Institute (1986–1995, associate professor since 2010).

Since 1981, he has been published as a critic in Literaturnaya Gazeta, New World, October, Banner, Friendship of Peoples, Our Contemporary, and Russian Binding online magazine. Observer, editor of the cultural department of the Rossiyskaya Gazeta newspaper. Member of the jury of the literary prize "Yasnaya Polyana".

Compiled collections of works by Maxim Gorky, Leonid Andreev, Osip Mandelstam, Mikhail Kuzmin; anthology "Village prose": In 2 vols. (Moscow: Slovo, 2000), Russian Prose 1950–1980: In 3 vols. (Moscow: Slovo, 2000), “Prose of the Second Half of the 20th Century”: In 3 vols. (M .: Slovo, 2001), “Russian lyrics of the 19th century” (M .: Eksmo-Press, 2009).

In 1993, the first book was published: a collection of articles and reviews “Plots and Faces” (M., 1993). In collaboration with Sergey Fedyakin, he wrote a book: “Russian literature of the late XIX – early XX centuries and the first emigration” (M., 1998). Winner of the Antibooker Prize in the nomination Ray of Light.

In 2008, he undertook a literary experiment – the creation of a universal Russian novel. The book "Russian novel, or the Life and adventures of John Polovinkin" claims to combine various genres and varieties of the novel: a detective story, a love story, a mystical novel, a political novel, an adventure novel, and so on. The main components of the novel, according to Basinsky, are hero and intrigue.

On 23 November 2010 the book "Leo Tolstoy: Flight from Paradise" was awarded the first place in the National Literary Prize "Big Book".

In 2014, he was awarded the Prize of the Government of the Russian Federation in the field of culture for the book "Saint against Leo. John of Kronstadt and Leo Tolstoy: A Story of One Enmity".

Bred by Victor Pelevin under the name Bisinsky in the novel Generation P and the short history of paintball in Moscow. Under the name Pavlo Basin appears in the story of Vladimir Sorokin “Day of the Oprichnik”. In turn, Basinsky portrayed Pelevin in Russian Novel as a fashion writer Viktor Sornyakov, author of the book Denikin and Nothing.

In 2018, the film directed by Avdotya Smirnova "The History of One Appointment" was released, the basis for which was one of the chapters of his book "The Holy Against Leo. John of Kronstadt and Leo Tolstoy. The story of one enmity ". The work was awarded the "Nika" and "Golden Eagle" prizes for the best screenplay (A. Smirnova, A. Parmas, P. Basinsky). Работа была отмечена премиями «Ника» и «Золотой орёл» за лучший сценарий (А. Смирнова, А. Пармас, П. Басинский).

The author of the text of "Total Dictation" of 2019. On 12 June 2019, during the Russia Day celebrations, he was awarded the State Prize of the Russian Federation in the Grand Kremlin Palace for 2018 in the field of literature and art for his contribution to the development of domestic literature.
