= Ay bılbılım =

"Ay bılbılım" ("Ah, my nightingale", Bashkir: Ай, былбылым,Tatar: Ай, былбылым) is a Tatar and Bashkir folk song.

== Lyrics sample ==
Bashkir

Ай, былбылым, вай, былбылым,
Ағиҙелдең ҡамышы;
Таң алдынан сут-сут килә
Һандуғастар тауышы.

Ай, былбылым, вай, былбылым,
Ағиҙелдә таң ата;
Таңдар ата, өҙөлә үҙәк,
Йырлата ла илата.

Ай, былбылым, вай, былбылым,
Ҡунып һайрай талдарға.
Һинең хаҡта серҙәремде
Асам һандуғастарға.

Tatar

Ay bılbılım, way bılbılım,
Ağidelneñ qamışı;
Tañ aldınnan çut-çut kilä
Sanduğaçlar tawışı.

Ay bılbılım, way bılbılım,
Ağideldä tañ ata;
Tañnar ata, özelä üzäk,
Cırlata da yılata.

Ay bılbılım, way bılbılım,
Qunıp sayrıy tallarğa;
Sineñ xaqta serläremne
Söylim sanduğaçlarğa.

English

Ah, my nightingale, wai, my nightingale,
Agidel reeds;
Before dawn "d-day" sounds
The voice of the nightingale.

Ah, my nightingale, wai, my nightingale,
On Agidel dawn rises;
Dawn rises, the soul suffers,
I would like to sing and cry.

Ah, my nightingale, wai, my nightingale,
Sings sitting in the Willows.
About you my secrets
Disclose the nightingale.
