= Lev Danilkin =

Soviet writer, journalist and literary critic

- Лев Данилкин
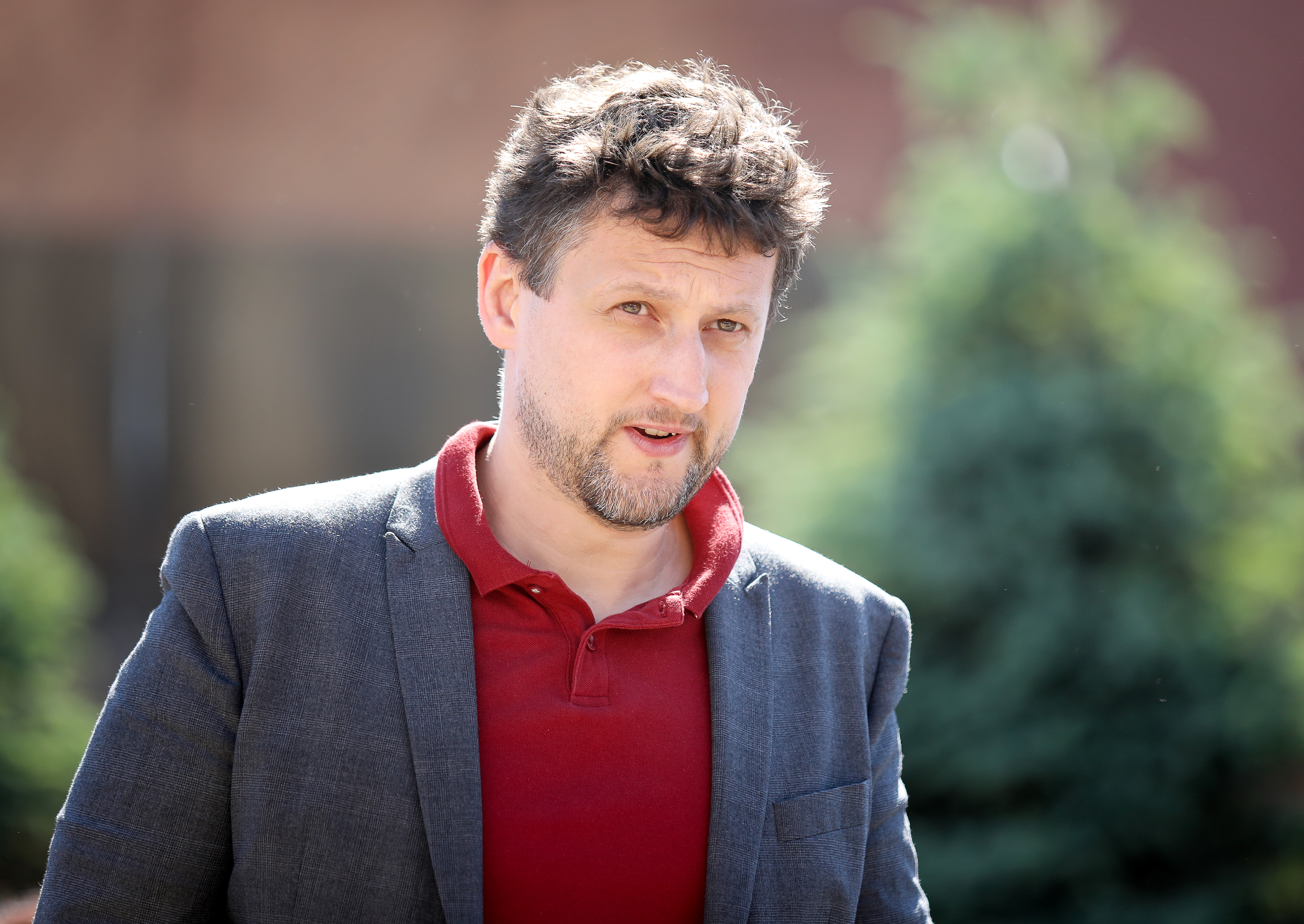
- Born: 1 December 1974 (age 51); Vinnytsia, Ukrainian SSR, USSR
- Citizenship: Russia
- Education: Moscow State University
- Occupations: Writer, translator, journalist, literary critic
- Writing career
- Language: Russian

Lev Aleksandrovich Danilkin (Russian: Лев Александрович Данилкин, IPA: [ˈlʲef ɐlʲɪkˈsandrəvʲɪdʑ dɐˈnʲilkʲɪn]; born 1 December 1974) is a Russian writer and literary critic. He won the Big Book literary prize in 2017.

== Education ==
Lev Danilkin was born into a family of literary teachers. He studied in middle schools in Odintsovo, Moscow Oblast, and in Moscow, and graduated in 1998 from the graduate school of philology of the Moscow State University.

== Career ==
In 1999–2000, Danilkin worked as the chief editor of the Russian edition of Playboy magazine. For 15 years he led the column "Books with Lev Danilkin" in Afisha magazine.

By the time he departed from Afisha in 2014, Danilkin had already written several biographies, including Man With an Egg: The Life and Views of Alexander Prokhanov about controversial writer Alexander Prokhanov, a book that was a finalist for the 2008 National Bestseller and Big Book awards. He also wrote a life of cosmonaut Yuri Gagarin for the ZhZL (Russian: ЖЗЛ — Жизнь Замечательных Людей) series.

Danilkin's greatest subject is Lenin, and his 2017 book Lenin. Pantocrator of Dust Motes became one of the central literary events surrounding the centenary of the October Revolution in Russia. That year it won both the Big Book and Book of the Year awards.

By peers and colleagues, Danilkin is praised as 'the leading critic in Russia'. Some consider him more talented than the people he writes about.

In 2021, Danilkin was honoured with the award Свети Стефан Штиљановић at the Serbian festival Ћирилица.
