= Daniel Jaffe =

American astronomer

Daniel Jaffe is an American astronomer, currently the Jane and Roland Blumberg Centennial Professor at University of Texas at Austin. He received his BA, MA, and PhD from Harvard University. He currently serves as the Interim Executive Vice President and Provost at The University of Texas at Austin. He previously served as the Vice President for Research.
