= Maya Kucherskaya =

Russian writer (born 1970)

Maya Alexandrovna Kucherskaya
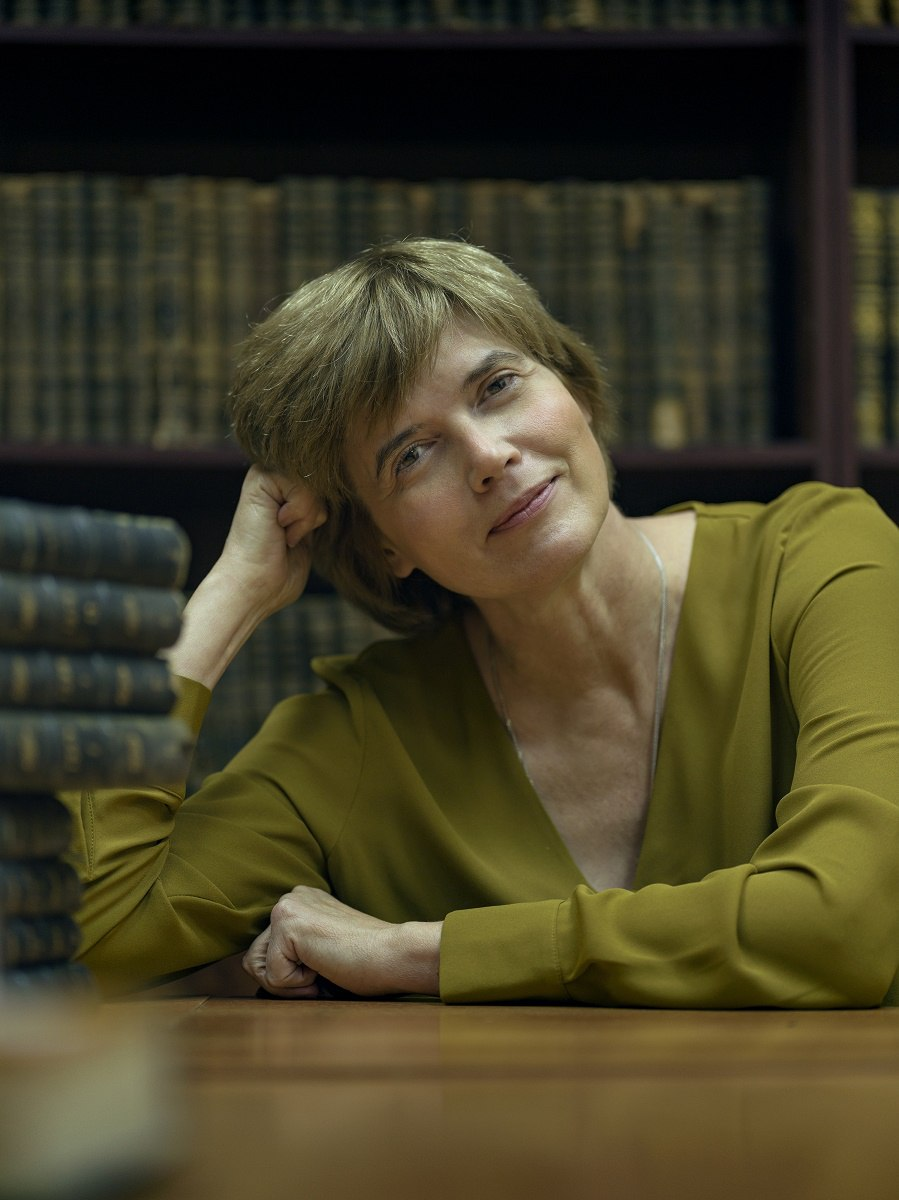
- Kucherskaya in 2013
- Born: May 2, 1970 (age 56); Moscow, USSR
- Citizenship: USSR, Russia
- Education: Moscow State University (1997), UCLA (1999)
- Writing career
- Notable awards: Ivan Bunin Award (2006), Student Booker Prize (2007), The Big Book Award (2021)

Maya Alexandrovna Kucherskaya (Russian: Ма́йя Алекса́ндровна Куче́рская; born May 2, 1970, in Moscow, USSR) is a Russian fiction writer, scholar, critic and professor.

She has earned degrees in Philology and Russian Literature (Moscow State University, 1997), as well as a PhD in Slavic Languages & Literatures (UCLA, 1999). She is a professor of Philology and head of the School of Creative Writing at the HSE University in Moscow.

== Biography ==
Maya Kucherskaya was born in 1970 in Moscow, USSR. She graduated from the School of Philology of the Moscow State University in 1992. From 1992 to 1995, she studied in the Department of Slavic Languages and Literatures in UCLA.

In 1997, Maya Kucherskaya defended her thesis "Russian Christmastide Story and the Problem of the Canon in Modern Literature" in MSU. She defended her second dissertation, titled "Grand Duke Constantine Romanov in Russian Cultural Mythology", in 1999 in UCLA.

Currently teaches at the Higher School of Economics as a professor at the School of Philology. From 2005 to 2015, she was a columnist for the newspaper Vedomosti (Ведомости).

Maya Kucherskaya is married with three children.

Author of the idea and screenwriter for a documentary "Donna Tanya. A Hundred Years of Happiness" (2023) about N. Leskov's great-granddaughter, ballerina and choreographer Tatyana Leskova, who has never lived in Russia.

== Fiction ==
Dr. Kucherskaya has been publishing her critical works since 1990 (in the magazine "Children's Literature") and her fiction since the late 1990s (in the magazines "Volga" and "Postscriptum"). In 1998, "Volga" published the tale named "The Story of an Acquaintance" about a parishioner's love for her spiritual father during perestroika. The same plot later formed the basis for the novel "The God of Rain."

Maya Kucherskaya's first book of prose, a collection of short stories about contemporary Orthodoxy, "A Modern Patericon: Reading for the Desperate", was first published in "Znamya" magazine in 2004 and, along with the story "Snowball Fight," won the magazine's award. The book was subsequently reprinted several times and was awarded the Bunin Prize (2006).

In 2005, the book "Konstantin Pavlovich," based on the writer's doctoral dissertation, was published in the "Lives of Remarkable People" series.

In 2007, "Vremya" Publishing House released Maya Kucherskaya's debut novel, "The God of Rain," which won the Student Booker Award. In 2008, the novel was shortlisted for the Yasnaya Polyana Award.

In September 2012, "Astrel" Publishing House released the psychological novel "Auntie Mina" on family issues in the 21st century. In 2013, the novel was shortlisted for the Big Book Award and the Yasnaya Polyana Award.

In the spring of 2014, the writer published a collection of experimental prose, "A Cry for the Drawing Teacher Who Left" at the AST Publishing House. This year, Kucherskaya was awarded the Order of the "Znamya" magazine.

In 2016, AST Publishing House released a collection of conversations between Maya Kucherskaya and practicing psychologist Tatyana Oizerskaya about a woman's path to happiness, "The Fish Swallowed Them...". In 2017, the same publishing house issued a collection of stories about the search for oneself and others while strolling around Moscow, "You Used to Be Completely Different: Eleven Urban Stories".

In 2021, Maya Kucherskaya's biography of N.S. Leskov, "The Overlooked Genius," based on archival materials, was published in the "Lives of Remarkable People" series. In December 2021, the book won second place in the Big Book Award, and in December 2022, it was shortlisted for the Yasnaya Polyana Award and the Reader's Award, a literary prize of the Russian library community. That same year, 2021, the writer published the book "The Bible for Children. Gospel Stories" at the AST Publishing House.

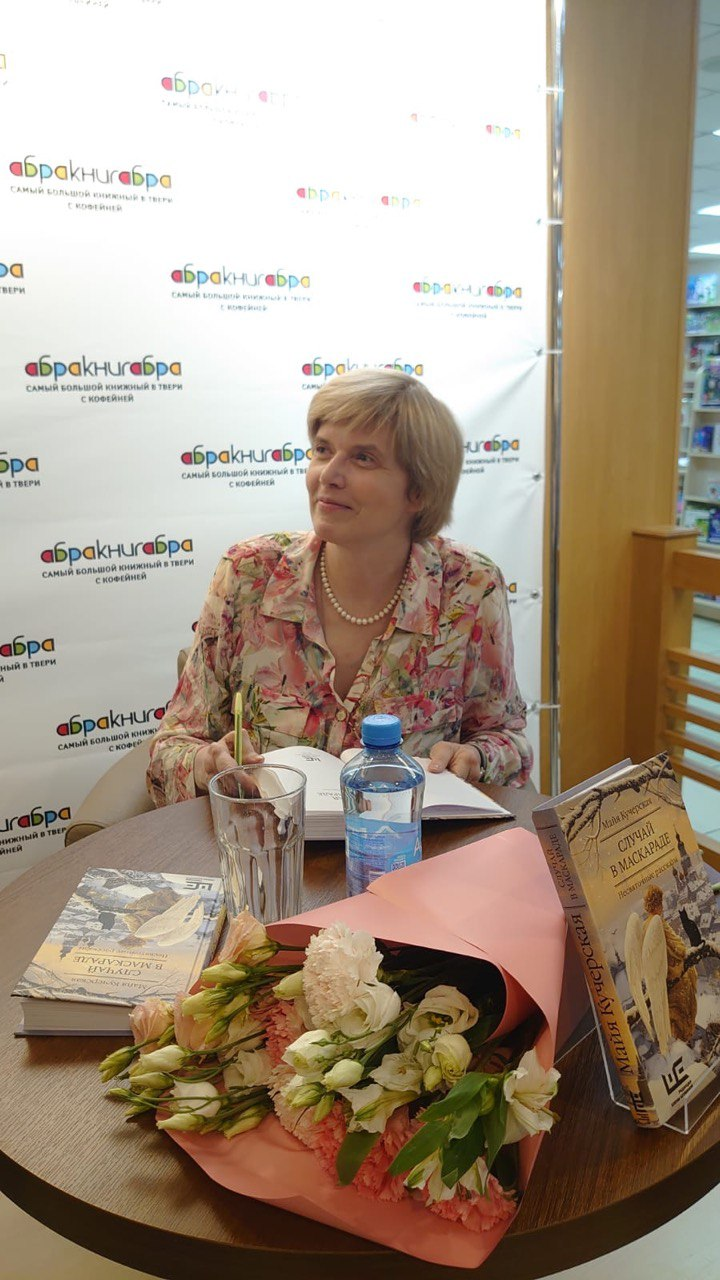
Maya Kucherskaya at the presentation of her book "Once at a Masquerade" in Tver (2025)

In 2025, Elena Shubina's Publishing House released Maya Kucherskaya's collection of Christmas stories, "Once at a Masquerade", which entered "The Big Book Award" shortlist that same year.

== Research ==
Maya Kucherskaya is the author of numerous scholarly works in Russian and English. Her research interests include the works of Nikolai Leskov, Nikolai Nekrasov, and Ivan Turgenev; Russian literature of the second half of the 19th century; literary education in the 20th century; the history of creative writing in Russia; poetry and teaching practices of Joseph Brodsky.

== Creative Writing ==
Dr. Kucherskaya is the founder and director of the Master's program in Creative Writing at the Higher School of Economics. Since 2019, she has organized the annual research conference "Theory and Practice of Creative Writing", held in collaboration with the Master's program .

In 2024, Maya Kucherskaya authored the concept, preface, and articles for the collection of research papers "Creative Writing in Russia: Subjects, Approaches, and Problems". This collection introduced the concept of Creative Writing studies to the Russian humanities; a portal dedicated to this academic field was created with the support of the Master's program.

She is the initiator and co-author of creative writing manuals ("Mom, I'm Going to Have a Book! How to Learn to Write in Different Genres and Find Your Style" (2020), "Literary Workshop. From Interviews to Longreads, from Reviews to Podcasts" (2020), and "Pot, Cook: Recipes for a Writer's Kitchen" (2024). In 2024, a collection of stories by graduates of the master's program, "Waiting Room", was published under the editorship of Maya Kucherskaya, Alexandra Kaverkina, and Denis Bannikov.

== Awards ==
2025 — Prize of the International Film Festival "Russia Abroad" for Best Film about Art named after S. Hollerbach ("Donna Tanya. One Hundred Years of Happiness"). Shortlist for the Big Book Award ("Once at a Masquerade").

2024 — Prize of the 17th International Film Festival "Salt of the Earth" ("Donna Tanya. One Hundred Years of Happiness").

2022 — Shortlist for the Reader's Award ("The Overlooked Genius").

2021 — Shortlist for the Yasnaya Polyana Award, the Big Book Award ("The Overlooked Genius").

2020, 2015–2016, 2013, 2011 — Best Teacher (Students' Choice, National Research University Higher School of Economics).

2014 — Cavalier of the Order of the Znamya Magazine.

2013 — Shortlisted for the Big Book and Yasnaya Polyana awards, and won the Big Book Readers' Choice Award for "Auntie Mina".

2008 — Shortlisted for the Yasnaya Polyana Award for "The God of Rain".

2006 — Nominated for the Ivan Bunin Award for "The Modern Patericon".

2004 — Debuted in Znamya (The Modern Patericon, story "Snowball Fight").

== Bibliography. Fiction ==
- Kucherskaya, M. Nostalgia; The Man in the Cardboard Box: Short Stories // Volga. — 1996. — No. 8–9. — Pp. 7–15.
- Kucherskaya, M. Calligraphy Lessons: Short Story // Postscriptum. — 1998. — No. 1. — Pp. 30–36.
- Kucherskaya, M. The Story of an Acquaintance // Volga. — 1998. — No. 10. — Pp. 14–101.
- Christmas Stories. — Moscow: Children's Literature, 1996. (Introductory Article, Commentary)
- Easter Stories. — M.: Publishing House of the Church of Sts. Cosmas and Damian, 1998. (Introduction, Commentary)
- Kucherskaya, M. Reading for the Desperate: The Modern Patericon // Znamya. — 2004. — No. 1. — Pp. 76–101.
- Kucherskaya, M. Snowball Fight: A Story // Znamya. — 2004. — No. 11. — Pp. 97–100.
- Kucherskaya, M. Modern Patericon: Reading for the Desperate. — Moscow: Vremya, 2005. — 288 p. — ISBN 5-9691-0038-2.
- Kucherskaya, M. The God of Rain. — Moscow: Vremya, 2007. — 320 p. — 10,000 copies. — ISBN 978-5-9691-0206-4.
- Kucherskaya, M. Kukusha: An Easter Story // Znamya. — 2008. — No. 10.
- Kucherskaya, M. To Hell with the Devil. — Moscow: Astrel, 2009. — ISBN 978-5-17-054783-8.
- Kucherskaya, M. Auntie Mina. — Moscow: Astrel, 2012. — 512 p. — 3,000 copies. — ISBN 978-5-271-44970-3.
- Kucherskaya, M. Cry for the Departed Drawing Teacher. — Moscow: Astrel, 2014. — 314 p. — ISBN 978-5-17-083872-1.
- Kucherskaya, M. I am a hedgehog. — Moscow: Alpina Publisher, 2016. — 32 p. — ISBN 978-5-9614-5560-1.
- Kucherskaya, M., Oizerskaya, T. The Fish Swallowed Them...: Conversations about Happiness. — Moscow: AST; Edited by Elena Shubina, 2016. — 448 p. — ISBN 978-5-17-096081-1.
- Kucherskaya, M. You Used to Be Completely Different. — Moscow: AST; Edited by Elena Shubina, 2017. — 352 p. — ISBN 978-5-17-098887-7.
- Kucherskaya, M. The Bible for Children. Gospel Stories. - M.: AST, 2021. - 94 p. — ISBN 978-5-17-137941-4.
- Kucherskaya, M. Once at a Masquerade. - M.: AST; Edited by Elena Shubina, 2025. - 288 p. — ISBN 978-5-17-170364-6.

== Bibliography. Selected research papers ==
- Kucherskaya, M. "The Russian Christmas Story and the Problem of Canon in Modern Literature": Abstract of a Dissertation for the Candidate of Philology: 10.01.01 / Lomonosov Moscow State University. Moscow, 1997. 21 p.
- Arkhangelsky, A., Bak, D., Kucherskaya, M., Stepanyan, K. “Russian Literature of the Second Half of the 19th Century: A Textbook for 10th Grade.” Moscow, Drofa: 2002.
- Kucherskaya, M. “Konstantin Pavlovich.” Moscow: Molodaia Gvardiya, 2005. 336 p. (The Lives of Remarkable People). ISBN 5-235-02837-6.
- Kucherskaya, M. “Comrade Leskov: How a Russian Writer Was Integrated into the Soviet National Myth” (in English) // Russian National Myth in Transition. Acta Slavica Estonica, VI. Studia Russica Helsingiensia et Tartuensia, XIV : collection. — 2014. — Vol. VI, no. XIV. — Pp. 187–207.
- Kucherskaya, M. Literary Borrowing in the Work of N. S. Leskov: A Case Study of "The Spendthrift" (in English) // The Russian Review. — 2016. — Vol. 75, no. 1. — P. 67–85.
- Kucherskaya, M. Leskov: The Overlooked Genius. — Moscow: Molodaya Gvardiya, 2021. — 622 p. — (The Lives of Remarkable People: a series of biographies; issue 1865).
- Kucherskaya, M. Propaganda Discourse in N. S. Leskov's "The Tale of the Cross-Eyed Lefty from Tula and the Steel Flea" // Scando-Slavica. — 2023. — Vol. 69, No. 1. — Pp. 88–105.
- Creative Writing in Russia: Plots, Approaches, Problems / compiled by M. Kucherskaya, A. Bazhenova-Sorokina, A. Chaban, D. Kharitonov. — Moscow: New Literary Review, 2024. — 352 p. — ISBN 978-5-4448-2151-0.
- Kucherskaya, M., Kelbert, E. Professor Brodsky: Poetica ex Cathedra // New Literary Review. — 2023. — Vol. 183, No. 5. — Pp. 122–138.
- Kelbert, E., Kucherskaya, M. Welcome to My Reflection: Joseph Brodsky’s Creative Writing Pedagogy (English) // Scando-Slavica : journal. — 2024. — Vol. 70. — P. 175–206. [Archived] September 19, 2025.

== Selected criticism ==
- Rodnyanskaya, I. "Irina Rodnyanskaya's Bookshelf" (about Maya Kucherskaya's "Modern Patericon") // Novy Mir. 2004, no. 8.
- Nemzer, A. "The Gift of Joy—the Joy of the Gift" (Vremya Publishing House has published Maya Kucherskaya's "Modern Patericon") // Nemzereski: website. 2004.
- Korolenko, P. "Maya Kucherskaya. A Modern Patericon" // Critical Mass. 2006, no. 1.
- Nemzer, A. "Finding Youth" (about Maya Kucherskaya's novel "The God of Rain") // Nemzereski: website. 2007.
- Kaidalova, N. "A Stone Thrown into the Sky" (about Maya Kucherskaya's book "The God of Rain") // Novy Mir. — 2008. — No. 1.
- Ganieva A. Maya Kucherskaya. To Hell with the Devil. A Slap in the Face of Public Taste // Voprosy literatury. — 2011. — No. 5.
- Dyakova E. "Running Not Staying" (about Maya Kucherskaya's book "Auntie Mina") // Novaya Gazeta. — 2012. — No. 111.
- Semikin G. "Armpits and Little Fingers" (about Maya Kucherskaya's book "Auntie Mina") // Literaturnaya Gazeta. — 2012. — No. 36.
- Kotyusov A. "God, Love, Air, and Loneliness" (about Maya Kucherskaya's book "Cry for the Departed Drawing Teacher") // Druzhba Narodov. — 2014. — No. 6.
- Sekretov S. "Before and After" (about Maya Kucherskaya's book "Cry for the Departed Drawing Teacher") // Znamya. — 2015. — No. 2.
- Safronova E. You Can Become Completely Different // Rara Avis. — 2017. — July 18.
- Sobolev L. The Overlooked Genius: Why We Need a New Biography of Nikolai Leskov // Gorky Media.
- Ranchin A. Against the Currents: About Leskov's New Biography and Its Hero // Novy Mir. — 2021. — No. 6.
- Krasnoselskaya Y. Review of: Kucherskaya M. A. Leskov: The Overlooked Genius. Moscow: Molodaya Gvardiya, 2021 // Bulletin of Moscow University. Series 9. Philology. — 2022. — No. 1.
