= Guzel Yakhina =

Russian author and screenwriter (born 1977)

- Гузель Яхина; Гүзәл Яхина
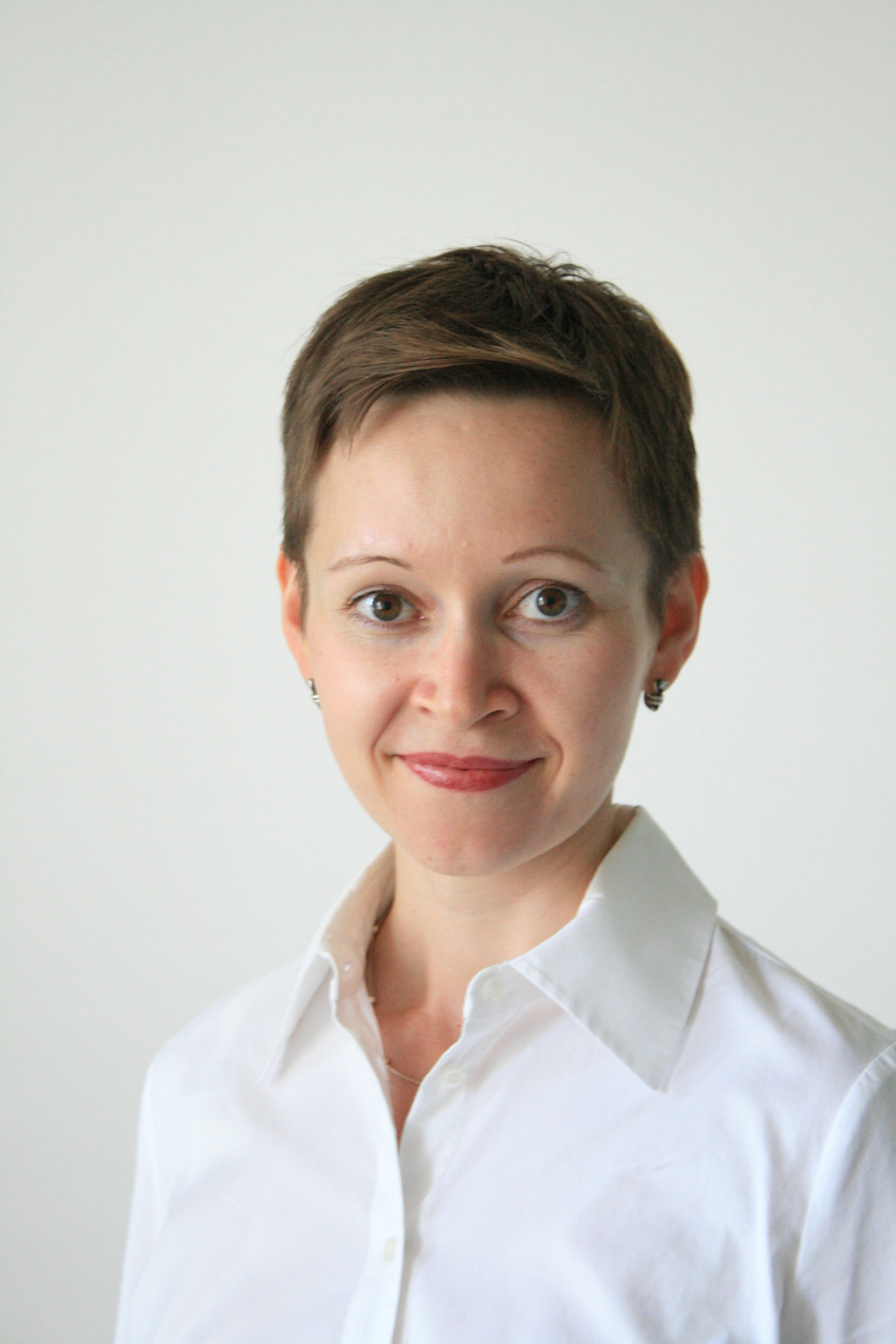
- Guzel Yakhina, 2015
- Born: 1 June 1977 (age 49); Kazan
- Education: Tatar State University of Humanities and Education
- Writing career
- Language: Russian
- Notable awards: Yasnaya Polyana Literary Award (2015); Big Book (2015)

Guzel Shamilyevna Yakhina (Russian: Гузель Шамильевна Яхина, Tatar: Гүзәл Шамил кызы Яхина, romanized: Güzäl Şamil qızı Yaxina, born 1 June 1977) is a Russian author and screenwriter. She is a winner of the Big Book literary prize and the Yasnaya Polyana Literary Award.

== Biography ==
Guzel Shamilevna Yakhina was born in Kazan. Her mother is a doctor, while her father is an engineer. She spoke Tatar at home and learned Russian only after she started going to daycare.

She studied at the Department of Foreign Languages in the Tatar State University of Humanities and Education. In 1999, she moved to Moscow. In 2015, she graduated from the Moscow School of Film with a degree in screenwriting.

She opposed the 2022 Russian invasion of Ukraine, stating that "Belief in peace was an inalienable part of Soviet childhood, instilling that belief in the identity of each of us. That belief seemed unshakable, as if it would last until the end of time... The news on February 24, 2022, crushed me. My world wasn't upended, it was simply destroyed," and adding that "This is not my war. I refuse to consider it mine."

== Career ==
Yakhina worked in public relations and advertising. She began her writing career with publications in the journals Neva and Oktyabr. Sections of her debut novel Zuleikha appeared in the journal Siberian Fires.

Yakhina's debut novel, Zuleikha, was published in 2019 and is based on the experiences of her grandmother, a Tatar. In the 1930s, as part of dekulakization programme, the Soviets forcefully relocated many Tatars from the European part of the USSR to Siberia. Yakhina's grandmother was among them. She was exiled at a young age and was able to return home only sixteen years later. The novel describes the experiences of Zuleikha, a peasant Tatar woman. Her husband resisted dekulakization and was killed. Zuleikha was transported to Siberia and left in a remote location on Angara River with little means of survival. Zuleikha had to overcome the harsh conditions, build relationships with other exiles and forge her new identity and reasons for living. Yakhina initially wrote the draft as a screenplay, and later rewrote it as a novel. Yakhina has said that before finally being published, the novel was rejected by multiple publishers. Zuleikha would go on to win, among other awards, the 2015 Big Book First Prize, Russia's most prestigious literary award.

Yakhina's second novel, A Volga Tale, was published in 2021 and translated into English in 2023. As The Wall Street Journal wrote in a positive review, "Steeped in folklore, legend, and the ever-changing beauty of nature along the river's banks, A Volga Tale nonetheless hauls its archetypal characters out of fairyland and into the 20th century of war, revolution, and dictatorship." The novel was very well received by critics: The New Yorker, describing it as a "rich epic," named A Volga Tale as A Best Book of 2023; similarly, it was a New York Times Editor's Choice and a World Literature Today Notable Book of 2023. It won France's 2021 Prix du Meilleur Livre Étranger (Best Foreign Book Prize), was a finalist for the 2021 Prix Médicis, and was longlisted for the European Literature Prize of 2021.

In 2023, Yakhina published her third novel, Train to Samarkand (Эшелон на Самарканд). Set in the early 1920s, the novel focuses on children transported from the Volga Region to Samarkand during the 1921 -1922 famine. It won the Russian Big Book reader's choice award.

Her fourth novel, Eisen, was published in 2025. It is a literary biography of the Soviet filmmaker Sergei Eisenstein.

== Works ==
=== Short stories ===
- "Мотылек". Neva (2). 2014.
- "Винтовка". Oktyabr (5). 2015.

=== Screenplays ===
- Подарок (Gift), 2016

=== Novels ===
- Зулейха открывает глаза. Moscow: АСТ. 2015. ISBN 978-5-17-090436-5.
  - Zuleikha. London: OneWorld. 2019. ISBN 9781786073495. English translation: Lisa C. Hayden
- Дети мои. Moscow: АСТ. 2018. ISBN 978-5-17-107766-2.
- Эшелон на Самарканд. Moscow: ACT. 2021. ISBN 978-5-17-135479-4
- Эйзен. Moscow. ACT. 2025

== Awards ==
- Yasnaya Polyana, 2015
- Big Book First Prize for Zuleikha, 2015
- Ticket to the Stars, literary prize of the City of Kazan, 2015
- Les prix du magazine "Transfuge" de la rentrée littéraire, France 2017
- Big Book Third Prize for My children, 2019
- Prix du Meilleur Livre Étranger (Best Foreign Book Prize) for A Volga Tale, France 2021
- A World Literature Today Notable Book for A Volga Tale, 2023
- A Best Book of 2023 in The New Yorker for A Volga Tale, 2023
- Prix Médicis Finalist for A Volga Tale, 2021
- The European Literature Prize: Longlisted for A Volga Tale, 2021
- A New York Times Editor's Choice for A Volga Tale, 2023
