= Federal Agency for Press and Mass Media =

Former Russian state agency

Federal Agency for Press and Mass Communications
- Федеральное агентство по печати и массовым коммуникациям России
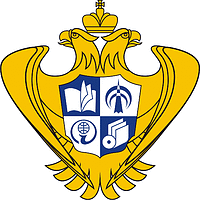

Agency overview
- Formed: 2004
- Preceding agency: Ministry of Press, Broadcasting and Mass Communications (МПТР)
- Dissolved: 2020
- Jurisdiction: Russia
- Agency executive: Mikhail Seslavinsky (2004-2020)
- Parent agency: Ministry of Digital Development, Communications and Mass Media
- Website: www.fapmc.ru

The Federal Agency for Press and Mass Communications (FAPMC; Russian: Федеральное агентство по печати и массовым коммуникациям России), abbreviated as Rospechat (Роспечать), was a regulatory state agency within the hierarchy of the Russian Government.

The agency succeeded the former Ministry of Press, Broadcasting and Mass Communications (МПТР). It was transformed during a governmental reform in 2004, and subordinated to the Ministry of Digital Development, Communications and Mass Media, so it was no longer a standalone ministry. Since reorganization, it was headed by Mikhail Vadimovich Seslavinsky until its abolition in 2020.

Rospechat was a federal executive body responsible for providing government services, and managing government property in the field of press, mass media and mass communications, including public computer networks used in electronic media as well as in printing and publishing.

The Federal Agency for Press and Mass Communications executed the following functions:

- rendering competitive government support to produce and/or distribute socially important media projects, to create and maintain social work and education-related websites
- participating in development and organization of events to implement the government policy in the following spheres:
  - printed media, information sharing, distribution of printed periodicals, printed media development and support
  - book publishing and reading and book promotion, implementation of the National reading support and development programme events
  - TV and radio broadcasting, digital technologies implementation, development and renovation of the satellite, ground cable and aerial networks, media and information sharing development
- analysing electronic media audience and printed media issues
- compiling compulsory free copies of all printed publications
- managing federal funds of produced and broadcast TV and radio programmes, shows, sound records and other audiovisual products (except movies)
- performing economic analysis of the subordinate state unitary enterprises, approving their economic indicators, and verifying their financial and operating performance and property employment
- acting as a governmental customer to obtain federal grants, research and development and innovation programmes and projects
- organizing congresses, conferences, seminars, exhibitions and other events related to press, publishing and printing, and electronic media
- monitoring printed media market, including its circulation, financial, advertising and other indicators
- preparing and issuing an annual analytical report the "conditions, problems and development prospects" of Russian printed media
- sponsoring electronic media from federal budget resources
- supporting compatriots living abroad, as well as maintaining a common information space for the Russian-speaking population in Russia and the countries of the near abroad
- implementing government policies regarding counter-terrorism and extremism operations, anti-drug abuse and trafficking activities
- rendering information, technical, organizational and consulting support to legal bodies and individual entrepreneurs in terms of radio-frequency spectrum utilization for TV and radio broadcasting, information sharing, and public computer networks development
- managing a voluntary certification system for the production of stamps and letterheads with the national emblem of the Russian Federation.

The Federal Agency for Press and Mass Communications cooperated with a series of broadcasters, publishers and other media market actors. It supported various national and international projects, including the annual Runet Prize, the Russian Internet Forum, the National Association of Television and Radio Broadcasters Congress, the Valdai International Discussion Club, the international multimedia festival "Vivid Word", the "Book of the Year" national contest, the Russian Publishing Expo Forum, and the national book festival "Red Square".

According to the Presidential Decree of the Russian Federation of November 20, 2020 No 719 "About enhancement of public administration in the sphere of digital development, communication and mass communications", the Federal Agency for Press and Mass Communications was abolished, and its functions were transferred to the Ministry of Digital Development, Communications and Mass Media of the Russian Federation.

== See also ==
- Communications in Russia
- Federal Service for Supervision in the Sphere of Telecom, Information Technologies and Mass Communications (Roskomnadzor)
