= Mikhail Seslavinsky =

Russian researcher in book culture, bibliophile and public figure

- Михаил Сеславинский
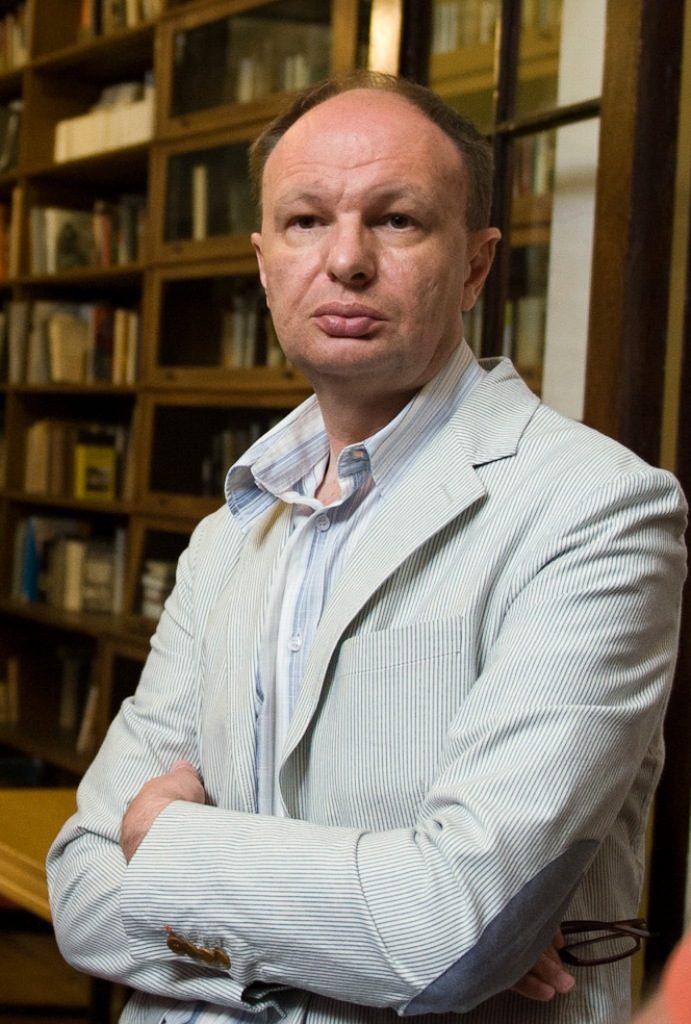
- Seslavinsky in 2013

Head of the Federal Agency for Press and Mass Media
- In office 9 March 2004 – 20 November 2020
- Prime Minister: Mikhail Fradkov; Viktor Zubkov; Vladimir Putin; Dmitry Medvedev; Mikhail Mishustin
- Preceded by: Office established
- Succeeded by: Office abolished

Personal details
- Born: 28 February 1964 (age 62) Dzerzhinsk, Gorky Oblast, RSFSR, Soviet Union
- Children: 2
- Education: Gorky State University
- Awards: Legion of Honour; TEFI

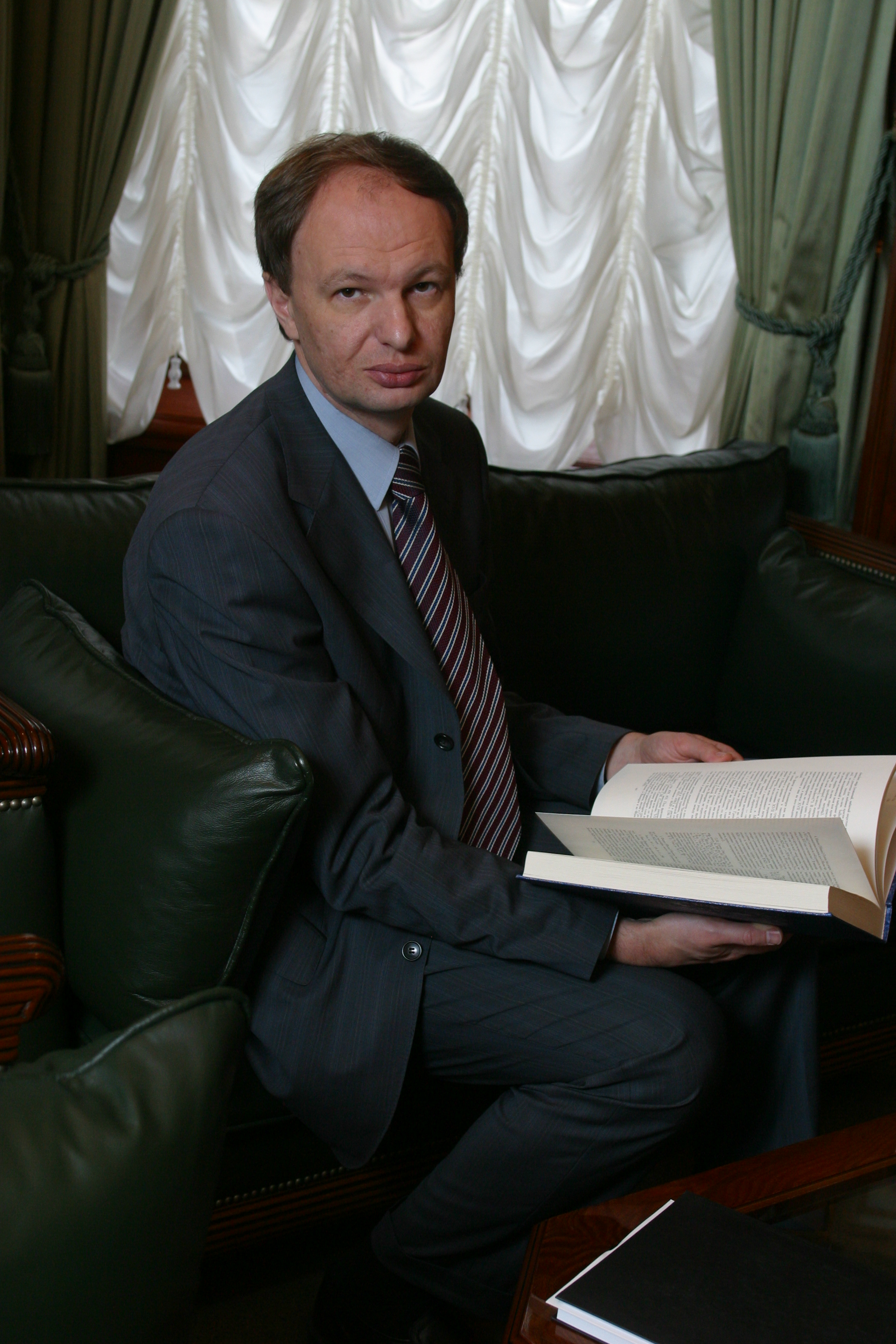
Mikhail Seslavinsky

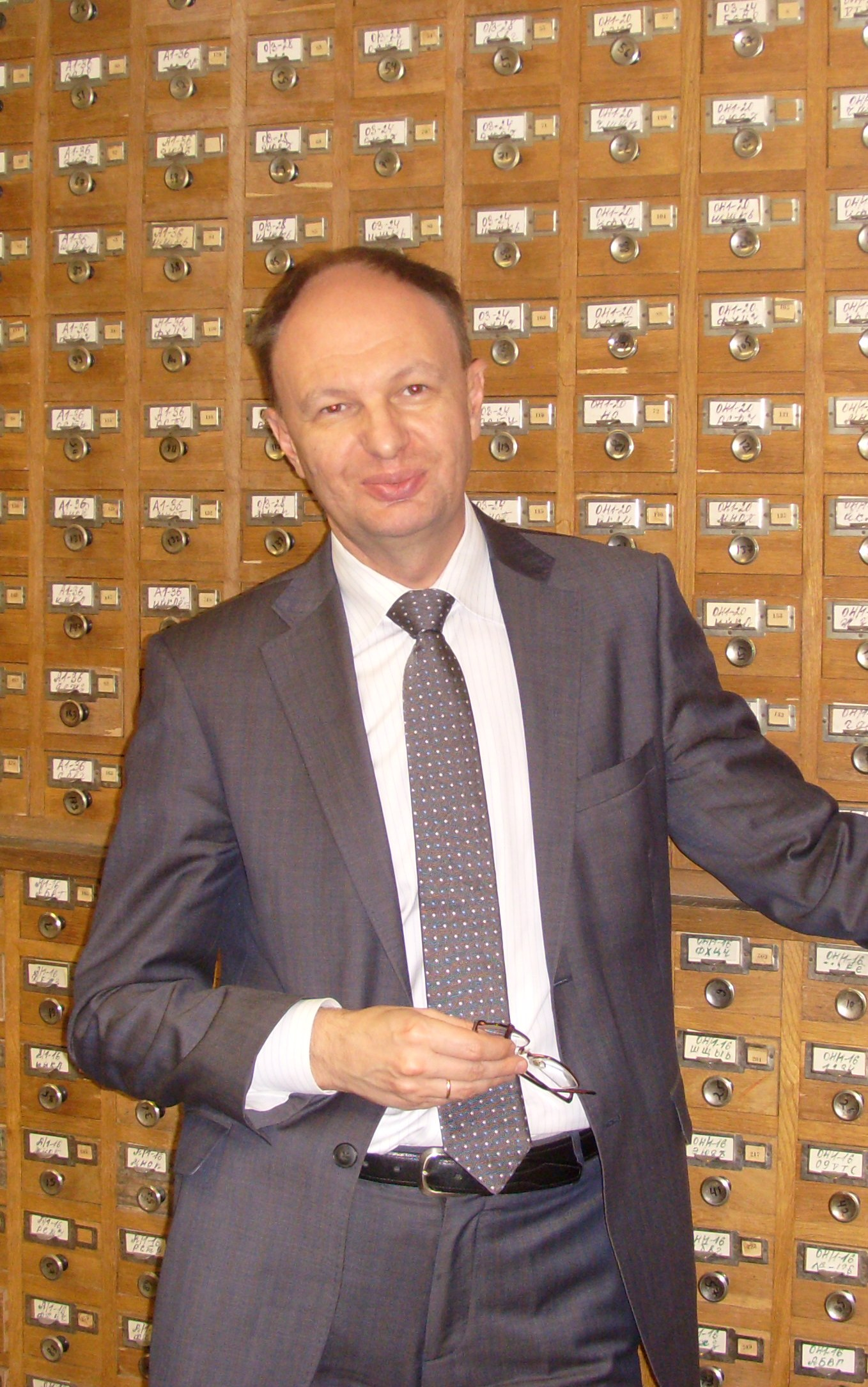
Mikhail Seslavinsky

Mikhail Vadimovich Seslavinsky (Russian: Михаи́л Вади́мович Сеславинский; born 28 February 1964) is a Russian researcher in book culture, bibliophile, and public figure.

== Biography ==
Born February 28, 1964 in the city of Dzerzhinsk (now in the Nizhny Novgorod Region), Seslavinsky graduated with a degree in history from the N. I. Lobachevsky Gorky State University (now N. I. Lobachevsky State University of Nizhny Novgorod).

From 1986 to 1989, he was a faculty member in the social sciences department at the Dzerzhinsk Branch of Gorky Polytechnic University (now N. I. Lobachevsky State University of Nizhny Novgorod).

In 1990, he was elected people’s deputy of the Russian parliament (Russian Soviet Federative Socialist Republic Supreme Council) for Dzerzhinsk District No. 364, as well as to the Gorky Regional Council of People's Deputies. As a member of the RSFSR Supreme Council, he was a deputy chairman of the Council’s Commission for Culture (1990-1993).

From 1993 to 1998, Seslavinsky served as a member of the State Duma. During this time, he chaired the 1st State Duma Subcommittee for Culture in the Committee for Education, Culture and Science. In the 2nd State Duma he was deputy chairman of the Committee for Culture.

In 1998-1999, he headed the Federal Service for Television and Radio Broadcasting.

From 1999 to 2004, he served as State Secretary and the First Deputy Minister for Press, Television, Radio Broadcasting and Mass Media in the Mikhail Kasyanov's Cabinet.

Since 2004, he has headed the Federal Agency for Press and Mass Communications until 2020. According to the Presidential Decree of the Russian Federation of November 20, 2020 No 719 "About enhancement of public administration in the sphere of digital development, communication and mass communications" the Federal Agency for Press and Mass Communications is abolished, and its functions are transferred to the Ministry of Digital Development, Communications and Mass Media of the Russian Federation.

In the period from 2010 to 2014, based on the decision of the agency's expert council, Rospechat provided state support to the TV Rain channel in the amount of 30.6 million rubles.

At Mikhail Seslavinsky’s initiative an ethics code for broadcasters – called the Charter of Broadcasters of the Russian Federation – was drafted and signed on April 28, 1999 by the heads of the leading Russian TV and radio broadcasters.

From 2001 to 2003, he was a member of the Board of Directors of Public Russian Television (ORT) and Channel One. From 2005 to 2010, he was Chairman of the Board of Directors at Prosveshchenie Publishing House and also the Administrative Direction for Print, Tver Children’s Book Printing and Publishing Integrated Works and the General Directorate for International Book Exhibitions and Fairs.

== Family ==
He is married and has two daughters, born 1994 and 2003. The older daughter Natalia Seslavinskaya has dedicated her career to the book industry, continuing the family tradition.

== Creation ==
Mikhail Seslavinsky is also a prominent bibliophile and collector of autographs and rare books from early 19th and 20th centuries. He has donated books and manuscripts to state libraries and collections (State Literary Museum, Library of the Russian Academy of Sciences, Russian State Library, Rudomino State Library for Foreign Literature, State Central Museum of Contemporary History of Russia, Pushkin State Museum, Admiral Lazarev Naval Library, Dmitry Mendeleev and Alexander Blok State Memorial Museum Reserve and Solzhenitsyn Center of Russian Emigré Studies).

Since February 2011, he has chaired the Council of the National Union of Bibliophiles. He has authored numerous articles on bibliology. A full bibliography of his works was published by Pashkov Dom Publishing House of the Russian State Library in 2014 under the title Mikhail Seslavinsky, Bibliophile and Bibliologist: Bibliographical Reference compiled by Leonid Fursenko with an introduction by Alexander Samarin.

Since 2008 Mikhail Seslavinsky has chaired the editorial board of the bibliophile magazine "Pro knigi" ("About books").

He is also the author of the book of children's stories Chastnoe pionerskoe (Private life of Soviet pioneers) which was made into a film of the same name; the collection of articles Homo Scriptoris [=Writing Man]; the books The Scent of a Book Binding (bibliophile album), Polaris (about the adventures of a bobcat in Finland) and The Rendezvous (Russian artists as depicted in French books of the first half of the 20th century); the album Books for Book Lovers (co-authored with Moscow State Printing University professor Olga Tarakanova); the album A Garland of Books and Pictures (children's reading in pre-revolutionary Russia); and the monograph French Bibliophilic Books with Drawings of Russian Émigré Artists (1920s-1940s). He also compiled the collection Tamizdat: 100 Selected Books a collection of articles about books by famous Russian writers and poets (Marina Tsvetaeva, Igor Severyanin, Boris Pasternak, Ioseph Brodsky, etc.), a catalogue titled a Bibliophile’s Wreath to Anna Akhmatova: Marking 125th Birthday – Autographs by Mikhail Seslavinsky; banned in the USSR, thair books were published abroad, as well as the album The Art of the Autograph and My Friend Osip Mandelstam. Selected Illustrated Bibliography and Autographs, and Rare Russian Books of the 20th Century: 333 Selected Books, Marina Tsvetayeva’s Bibliophilic Garland, A Cantata to the Cantata.

On the occasion of the 175th anniversary of the birth of Anatole France, a collection of his writings was developed and published, with an afterword "The Russian dinner of Anatole France". The book also includes some previously unknown drawings by Tatyana Mavrina and Antonina Sofronova: "France", "Anatole", "Under the Sign of Queen Pedok". Riot of Angels, St. Petersburg, Vita Nova Publishing House, 2019.

Seslavinsky is a member of the Board of Trustees at State Tretyakov Gallery, the Russian State Archive of Literature and Art, the Orthodox Encyclopedia, and chairs the Boards of Trustees at the Ivan Fyodorov Moscow State University of Printing Arts.

On August 26, 2013, Mikhail Seslavinsky joined the Council for the Russian Government Media Award. He has been member of the State Radio Frequency Commission since 2004, the Government Commission on Television and Radio Broadcasting, as well as the Government Commission on Religious Organizations.

Mikhail Seslavinsky headed the commission for the celebration of the 125th anniversary of Korney Chukovsky and the commission for the celebration of the 100th anniversary of Lydia Chukovskaya.

In 2015, he was Deputy Chairman of the Organizing Committee of the Year of Literature in Russia.

Mikhail Seslavinsky headed the jrganizing committee for the preparation and holding celebrations of the 100th anniversary of Konstantin Simonov.

Mikhail Seslavinsky headed the organizing committee for the preparation and holding of the celebration of the 125th anniversary of Osip Mandelstam.

Mikhail Seslavinsky headed the organizing committees for the preparation and holding of the celebration of the 125th anniversary of Konstantin Paustovsky and Marina Tsvetaeva.

He is also Deputy Chairman of the organizing committee for the preparation and holding of the celebration of the 150th anniversary of Maxim Gorky in 2018.

He is also Deputy Chairman of the organizing committee for the preparation and holding of the celebration of the 100th anniversary of Alexander Solzhenitsyn in 2018.

He heads the organizing committee for the preparation and holding of the celebration of the 200th anniversary of Nikolai Nekrasov in 2021.

He heads the organizing committee for the preparation and holding of the celebration of the 150th anniversary of Ivan Bunin in 2020.

Mikhail Seslavinsky holds a Ph.D.Candidate of Historical Sciences, Corresponding Member of the Russian Academy of Arts (Department of Art History and Art History).

In June 2023, the Pushkin State Museum opened the exhibition “The Book and Graphic World of Alexander Benois in the Collection of Mikhail Seslavinsky. With additions from the funds of the State Museum of A. S. Pushkin”, dedicated to the 125th anniversary of the creative association “World of Art”. It presented works in the field of theatrical graphics - sketches of costumes and scenery, works in the field of book graphics, as well as letters from A.N.Benois/

Seslavinsky has received a number of Russian state awards. He is a Knight of the Order of the Legion of Honor, a decoration he was awarded for his efforts to promote cultural ties between France and Russia.

- Izvestia 23 Dec 2014
- RBK 23 Dec 2014
- Izvestia 76 Nov 2014
- Investigative Committee of Inquiry to the head Rospechat Michael of "anti-state media" - Moskovsky Komsomolets", April 7, 2015
- From 2010 to 2014 Rospechat "into significant financial injections from the state budget in the media whose editorial policy had a pronounced anti-state position." – RBC, April 27, 2015
- Rospechat accused of financing anti-state media - Echo de Moscou, April 8, 2015
- Investigation Committee of suspected Rospechat financing of independent media - New newspaper, April 10, 2015
- Rospechat financed TV channel "Rain" for 30 million rubles - Izvestia, April 7, 2015
- Michail Seslavinsky: Of “The Literature Year” surprises and unique projects
- Seslavinsky: “The Literature Year” will be versatile in Moscow and in regions
- Russian Government Direction
