= Alexander Goldstein (writer) =

Russian writer

- Native name: Александр Гольдштейн
- Born: Alexander Leonidovich Goldstein; 15 December 1957; Tallinn, Estonian SSR, USSR (present-day Estonia)
- Died: 16 July 2006 (aged 48); Tel-Aviv, Israel
- Occupation: Writer, journalist
- Language: Russian
- Citizenship: Israeli
- Genres: Novels, essays
- Literary movement: Postpostmodernism
- Notable awards: Russian Little Booker Prize, Anti-Booker prize, Andrei Bely Prize

Alexander Leonidovich Goldstein (Russian: Александр Леонидович Гольдштейн; born 15 December 1957, Tallinn, Estonia — 16 July 2006, Tel-Aviv, Israel) — was a Russian writer and essayist. He was awarded the Russian Little Booker Prize, the Anti-Booker prize and the Andrei Bely Prize (posthumously, in the category for prose).

== Biography and work ==
Alexander Goldstein was born in Tallinn, the son of Leonid Goldstein, a man of letters. From his early childhood on, he lived in Baku, where he later studied literature at Baku State University. From 1991, he lived in Tel-Aviv.

Goldstein worked as a journalist for the newspaper Vesti, as well as other Russian-language publications, and sat on the editorial board of the Russian-Israeli journal Zerkalo. His articles were published in the books Расставание с Нарциссом (Parting from Narcissus) and Аспекты духовного брака (Aspects of Spiritual Matrimony). The first of these volumes, published in 1997, gained recognition as one of the most important books of the decade. For instance, the Russian literary academic Irina Prohorova wrote about Parting from Narcissus, and indeed Goldstein's work as a whole:

He was the first to describe that peculiar time in which we partly continue to live, but perhaps have already left behind. In any case, beginning with his first articles and his first book, Parting from Narcissus, which marked a huge cultural upheaval in the middle of the 1990s, he was the first to have the courage to say certain things, to push back certain borders and barriers. What he tried to do (and it's even worth asking how he managed to do it) was to find the language of the time.

In the opinion of Sasha Sokolov:

It seems he was only really appreciated by professionals. Living here and now, in Tel-Aviv, I remember our few meetings and frequently walk along Ben Yehuda Street, past his house... Sasha is difficult. He's not only difficult stylistically, but also philosophically. He offers up his immense knowledge without thinking of the reader, without glancing back at him – a knowledge of art, science, philology, naturally. I can understand the value of his texts, but I don't understand how they were made.

In 2002, moved into large-scale forms with Помни о Фамагусте (Remember Famagusta), a "novel in the Schlegelian sense." With time, he acquired the reputation of a refined stylist, erudite intellectual and thinker.

He died from lung cancer in 2006, the same year that his last novel, Спокойные поля (Quiet Fields) was posthumously published. A volume of his selected prose appeared in Hebrew translation in 2009, though he has yet to be translated into English.

The poet and essayist Alexei Tsvetkov remembered him with these words:

...he had very few friends in the commonly accepted sense of the word – that is, people who could climb into each other's skin. He was one of those people who protect their own territory very well. Yet at the same time, as strange as it might seem, it was easier to talk with him than with many in this traditional "subcutaneous" category.

Mikhail Shishkin praised Goldstein's work and cited him as an inspiration. In an English-language talk at the Harriman Institute of Columbia University, Shishkin said:

For me now, the top of Russian literature is Alexander Goldstein. [...] I'm sure in fifty years here at Columbia University and other American universities all professors will consider our time, our epoch, the epoch of Alexander Goldstein. And we, writers, will be just contemporaries of Alexander Goldstein. We just shared with him the epoch. [...] And if you asked me, "What Russian writers are important and genius nowadays?", I would say: "Read Alexander Goldstein".

Alexander Goldstein's wife – Irina Goldstein – was also a journalist.

== Published works ==
- "Расставание с Нарциссом" (Parting from Narcissus), М.,НЛО, 1997, ISBN 5-86793-025-4
- "Аспекты духовного брака" (Aspects of Spiritual Matrimony), М.,НЛО, 2001, ISBN 5-86793-146-3
- "Помни о Фамагусте" (Remember Famagusta), М.,НЛО, 2004, ISBN 5-86793-290-7
- "Спокойные поля" (Quiet Fields), М., НЛО, 2006 ISBN 5-86793-475-6
- "Памяти пафоса" (In Memory of Pathos), М., НЛО, 2009 ISBN 978-5-86793-726-3
