= Nikolay Kolyada =

Russian playwright, theatre director and actor (1957–2026)

- Николай Коляда
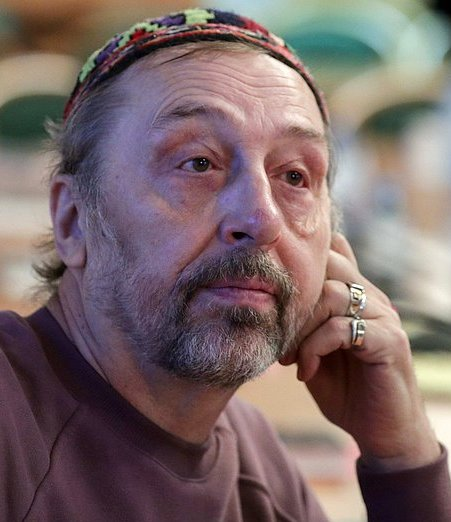
- Kolyada in 2019
- Born: 4 December 1957; Presnogor'kovka, Kostanay Region, Kazakh SSR, Soviet Union
- Died: 2 March 2026 (aged 68); Yekaterinburg, Russia
- Education: Sverdlovsk Academic Theatre of Drama; Gorky Literary Institute
- Occupations: Playwright, theatre director, teacher, actor
- Notable work: Slingshot; Oginski Polonaise
- Style: Neo-Naturalism

Nikolay Vladimirovich Kolyada (Russian: Николай Владимирович Коляда; also transliterated as Nikolai Koliada; 4 December 1957 – 2 March 2026) was a Russian actor, theatre director, writer, playwright, and teacher. Theatre critic John Freedman named Kolyada as one of several dramatists and directors who might be designated as "fathers" or "mothers" of Russia's contemporary theatre movement. (Other contenders mentioned are Aleksei Kazantsev, Elena Gremina, Nadezhda Ptushkina, and Ol’ga Mukhina). The New York Times said that Kolyada's work has made Yekaterinburg a "center of modern drama". Kolyada was one of the first Russian playwrights to address homosexuality in his work, especially in Slingshot.

== Life and career ==
Kolyada was born on 4 December 1957, in Presnogor'kovka in the Kustanai region of the Kazakh SSR, Soviet Union. He studied theater in Sverdlovsk, Russian SFSR (now known as Yekaterinburg). He worked as an actor with the Sverdlovsk Academic Theatre of Drama, and studied writing at the Gorky Literary Institute in Moscow. From 1978 to 1980, he served in the Soviet Army in communications units in Perm. Kolyada began writing in the early 1980s. His first short story, Sklizko!, was published in 1982 in the newspaper Ural'sky Rabochy. In the same year, he wrote his first play, Dom v tsentre goroda. His play Igraem v fanty was first published in 1987. His first work as a director took place in 1988 at the experimental theatre "Galërka" in Sverdlovsk, where he staged his own play Nine White Chrysanthemums. He gained international repute with his play Slingshot, which gave a sympathetic portrayal of a gay relationship. The play featured a romance between a nurse and his patient, a soldier wounded in the Soviet–Afghan War. Although the gay subject matter was shocking in Moscow, it earned him acclaim abroad when the play received its world premiere at the San Diego Repertory Theatre in 1989.

In 1989, he was admitted to the Union of Soviet Writers, and in 1990 became a member of the Union of Theatre Workers of the Russian Federation. In 1990, he initiated the restoration of the St. Nicholas Church in his native village of Presnogor'kovka, which had been destroyed in the early 1930s and later repurposed as a fire station.

When he began writing for the theater in the mid-1980s, Kolyada got a reputation for "chernukha", which critic John Freedman describes as an "almost untranslatable but expressive Russian noun [combining] shades of gloom, doom, bile, and jaundice colored with foul-mouthed-insolence". His plays are known for their naturalistic approach to representing life's banal and pitiful troubles. His plays were among the first in Russia to use profanity, and are known for it. His scant use of profanity violated taboo at the time, but set the stage for much more pervasive obscenities by 2010.

In 1992–1993, Kolyada lived and worked in Germany. He spent nine months at the Akademie Schloss Solitude in Stuttgart on a fellowship, where he continued writing plays and prose. He also collaborated with German theatre practitioners and appeared as an actor in a production at the Deutsches Schauspielhaus in Hamburg.

After living and working in Moscow for a time, Kolyada returned to Yekaterinburg, and was instrumental in bringing the city's theater activity to prominence. He taught playwriting at the Ural Institute and the Ekaterinburg State Theatre Institute from 1992, often teaching auditors as well as enrolled students. In 1994, his first collection, Plays for a Beloved Theatre, was published. In December 1994, he organised the first edition of the Kolyada-Plays festival in Yekaterinburg, a festival dedicated to productions of a single playwright, which brought together theatres from across Russia and abroad. Kolyada founded his theatre in 2001 - it has changed venue in Yekaterinburg several times. Beginning in 2003, he also organised the international Eurasia competition for young playwrights. In 2003–2004, without a permanent venue, he collaborated with the small drama theatre "Teatron" in Yekaterinburg.

His students would present their work at his Kolyada Theater in Yekaterinburg. His programme is cited as one of the few playwriting programmes in Russia, and several of his students have gone on to be produced in major venues in Moscow. Two of Kolyada's students, Oleg Bogayev and Vassily Sigarev, have gained international acclaim and been produced in the United States.

From July 1999 to August 2010, Kolyada served as editor-in-chief of the literary journal Ural, significantly increasing its prominence and readership.

In 2009, he founded the Centre for Contemporary Drama in Yekaterinburg, which became a platform for experimental work by emerging playwrights and directors. In 2006 and 2008, Kolyada Theatre held its first major tours in Moscow, performing at the Sovremennik Theatre and the Meyerhold Center. In 2009 and 2010, Kolyada Theatre toured in France. From 2011, Kolyada Theatre held an annual festival in Moscow at the Theatre Center "Na Strastnom".

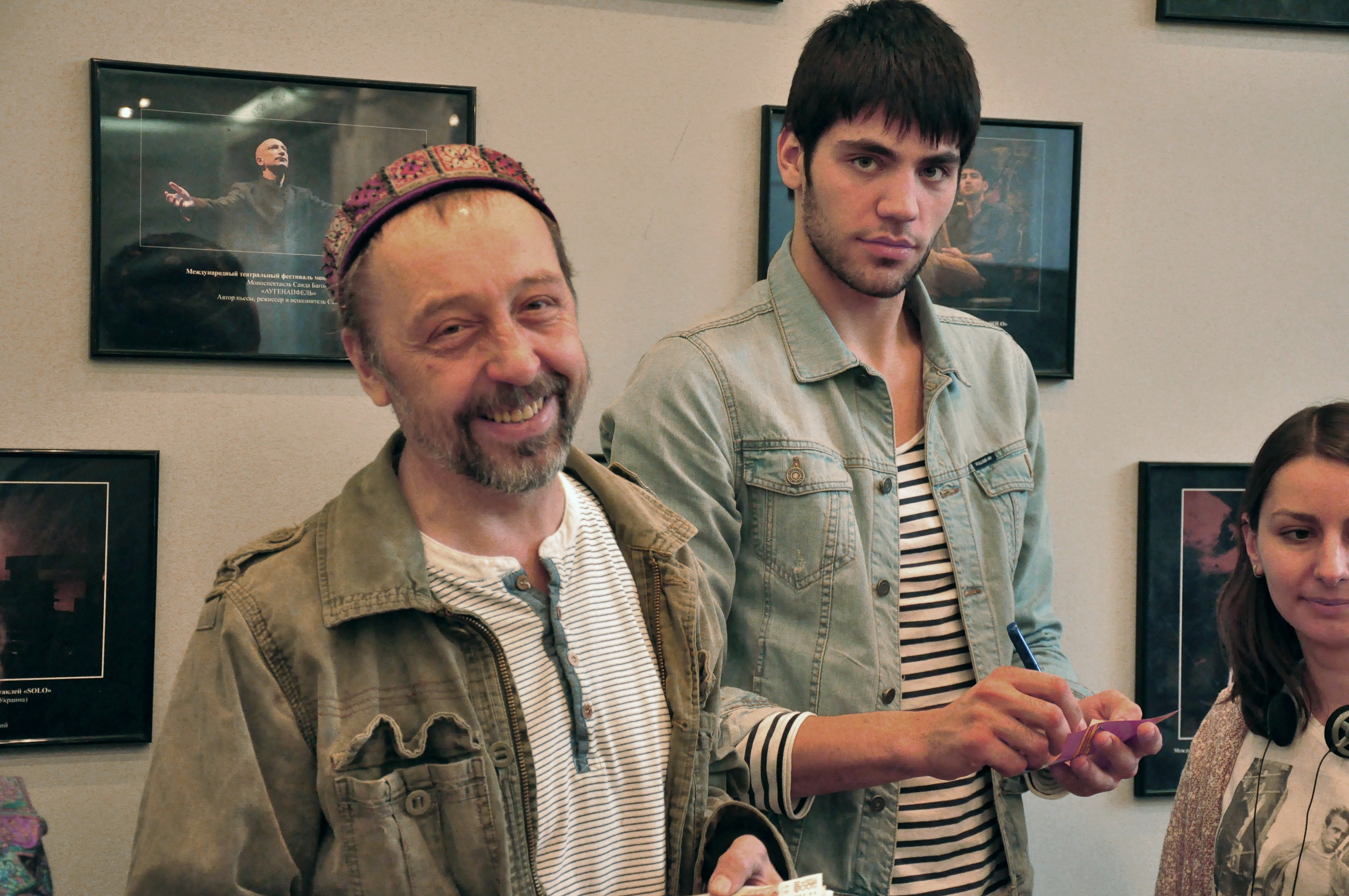
Kolyada Theatre company in the foyer of the Theatre Center "Na Strastnom" in Moscow, January 2013

In 2022, he was awarded the academic title of docent at the Ekaterinburg State Theatre Institute. In 2023, he became a professor at the Ekaterinburg State Theatre Institute.

Kolyada was a prolific playwright. In 2006, Kolyada told a reporter, "I've written 90 plays. Thirty of them are good". By 2010, the count of his plays exceeded 100.

He also worked in television, hosting the authorial programme Black Cashbox on Sverdlovsk State Television and Radio Company, and in 2002 hosted the programme My World on the Russia-K channel.

On 14 January 2014, Kolyada was removed from a flight from Yekaterinburg to Moscow at Koltsovo Airport due to intoxication.

As a director, Kolyada was known for stark and dramatic productions using minimalist scenery and a stylized performance style. Critic John Freedman described the design of one production as typical of Kolyada's approach. He wrote, "The use of water and the sheet of plastic are characteristic of Kolyada’s theatre art: the barest of devices, the simplest of objects, the most powerful of effects". Moscow News critic Irina Korneeva Vremya wrote in 2002 that she found his directing style to be "touching," but repetitive, and ultimately "artless," writing that "an abundance of superfluous detail and endless strolls across the stage to music are no style. They are a disaster".

In 2012, Kolyada came under fire when he declared his support for Vladimir Putin's 2012 presidential campaign, saying that Putin was the best of the available candidates. Kolyada was the target of what the BBC described as a "massive bullying campaign" due to his support of Russian president Vladimir Putin. Kolyada's blog was overrun with comments attacking his views, and his theater was papered over with bills for a fake performance.

Kolyada's theater company planned a United States tour in 2017, but the tour was cancelled due to diplomatic tensions between the United States and Russia, and the unavailability of travel visas after the United States withdrew over 1,200 diplomatic personnel from Russia. The company was to bring three of its productions to America: The Twelve Chairs; Violin, Tambourine, and Iron; and Baba Chanel. Interfax reported that the company lost US$60,000 on the cancellation.

Kolyada was often associated with the Russian New Drama movement, though he rejected that label.

Kolyada died on 2 March 2026 in Yekaterinburg at the age of 68, after being hospitalised with bilateral pneumonia.

== Family ==
Kolyada was born into a large working-class family of virgin lands settlers in Presnogor'kovka, Kazakh SSR. He was the fifth child in the family; his father, Vladimir Alekseevich Kolyada (1930–2019), worked as a tractor driver at the local state farm, while his mother, Zoya Vasilyevna Kolyada (née Aleksandrova; 1935–2009), worked as a milkmaid.

Kolyada's paternal grandfather, Alexei Pavlovich Kolyada, originally from Poltava Oblast, had relocated to the Trans-Urals region in 1913. In 1956, together with his wife Tatyana Kuzminichna, he moved to Presnogor'kovka as part of the virgin lands campaign.

Kolyada had two sisters and two brothers:

- Vera Vladimirovna Kizina (née Kolyada; b. 1952), who worked as a shopkeeper in Presnogor'kovka;
- Nadezhda "Nadya" Kolyada (1955–1965), who died in her teens;
- Vladimir Vladimirovich Kolyada (b. 1965), who has a disability;
- Andrey Vladimirovich Kolyada (b. 1972), a truck driver in northern Russia.

Kolyada never married and had no children; he often referred to his theatre students and actors as his "family" and primary successors.

== Ural School of Dramaturgy ==
Kolyada is widely recognised as the founder and ideological leader of the Ural School of Dramaturgy, a distinctive movement in contemporary Russian theatre that emerged in the mid-1990s.

The term was first coined in 1995 by theatre scholar Zinovy Korogodsky during a seminar in Omsk, when describing the cohesive creative community that Kolyada had formed at the Yekaterinburg State Theatre Institute (EGTI). Unlike formal artistic manifestos, the school developed organically through Kolyada's teaching practice and his emphasis on authentic, emotionally raw storytelling rooted in provincial Russian life.

=== Notable students ===
Kolyada taught playwriting at the Yekaterinburg State Theatre Institute from 1994, developing and leading a dedicated course in dramaturgy. Many of his students went on to become prominent playwrights and theatre practitioners. Among them:

- Oleg Bogaev – playwright, author of Russian National Post and The Bootmaker;
- Vassily Sigarev – internationally acclaimed playwright, author of Plasticine and Ladybird;
- Yaroslava Pulinovich – playwright known for Natasha's Dream and Baba Chanel (adapted by Kolyada);
- Irina Vaskovskaya, Semyon Vyatkin, Tatyana Garbar, Roman Dymshakov, Roman Kozyrchikov, Nadezhda Koltysheva, Aleksandr Naydyonov, Rinat Tashimov, and others.

The school's aesthetic is characterised by a blend of naturalism and poetic symbolism, with an emphasis on the lives of ordinary people in Russia's provinces. Kolyada described his pedagogical approach as fostering "spiritual-practical community" where dramatic texts are organically realised on stage.

=== Legacy and influence ===
The Ural School continues to influence contemporary Russian theatre, with new generations of playwrights building on its foundations while adapting to changing social contexts. Kolyada's former students have had their works produced not only in Russia but also in Europe and the United States, extending the school's reach internationally.

== Theatre career ==
=== Acting ===
Kolyada began his stage career in the late 1970s with the Sverdlovsk Academic Theatre of Drama. His early repertoire included Lariosik in The Days of the Turbins (1977), Kinto in Khonuma (1977), and Medvedenko in The Seagull (1983). After leaving the company in 1983, he returned to the stage internationally in 1993, portraying Anton Chekhov in On Sakhalin at the Deutsches Schauspielhaus in Hamburg.

In his own theatre, Kolyada frequently performed in key productions, often taking on iconic classical roles. He played the Ghost of Hamlet's Father in Hamlet (2007) and the title role in King Lear (2008), the latter praised by critics for its raw, unconventional interpretation. His final major stage role was as Kisya Vorobyaninov in an adaptation of The Twelve Chairs (2017).

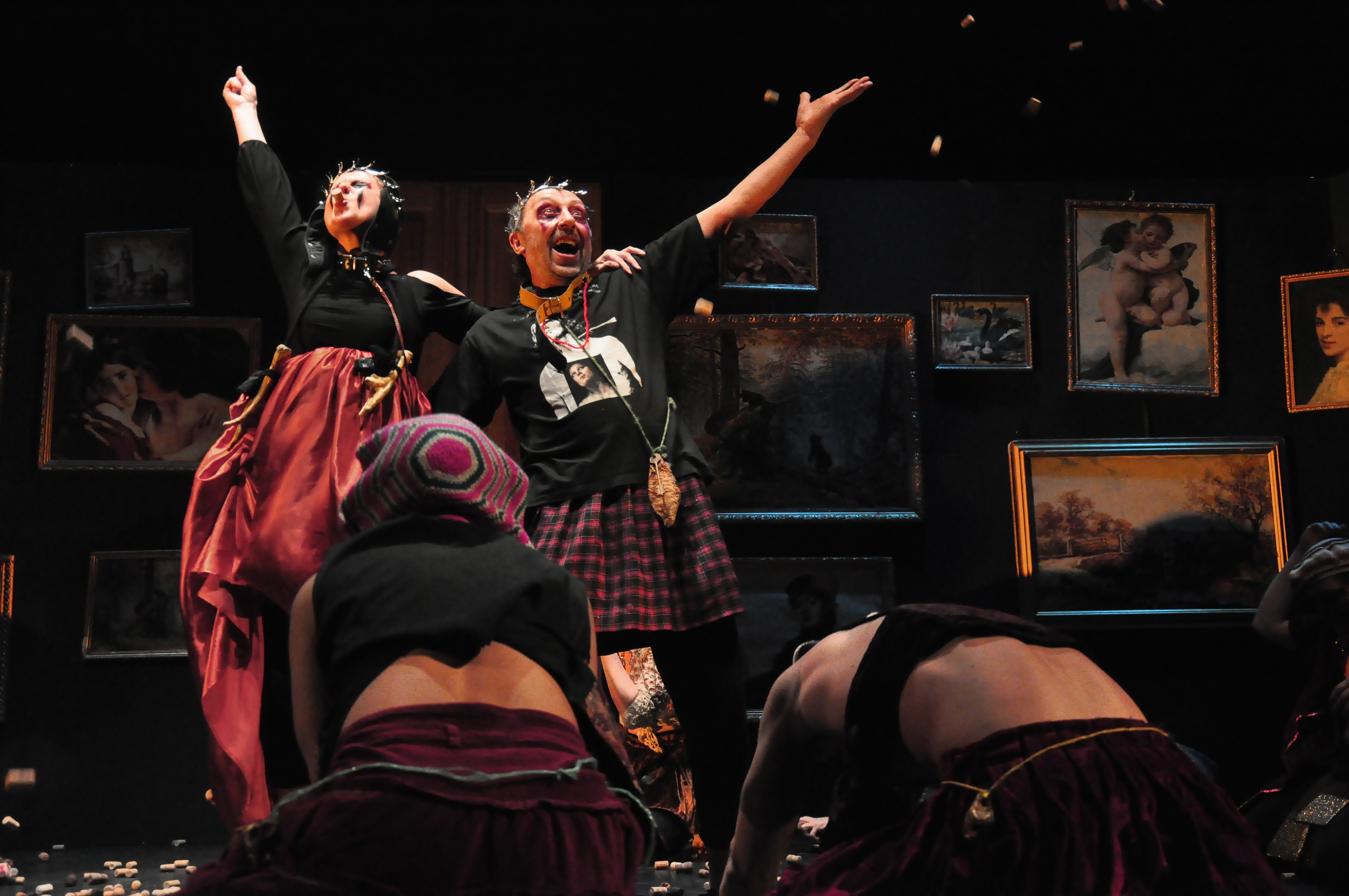
Kolyada as the Ghost of Hamlet's Father during the Moscow tour, 2014

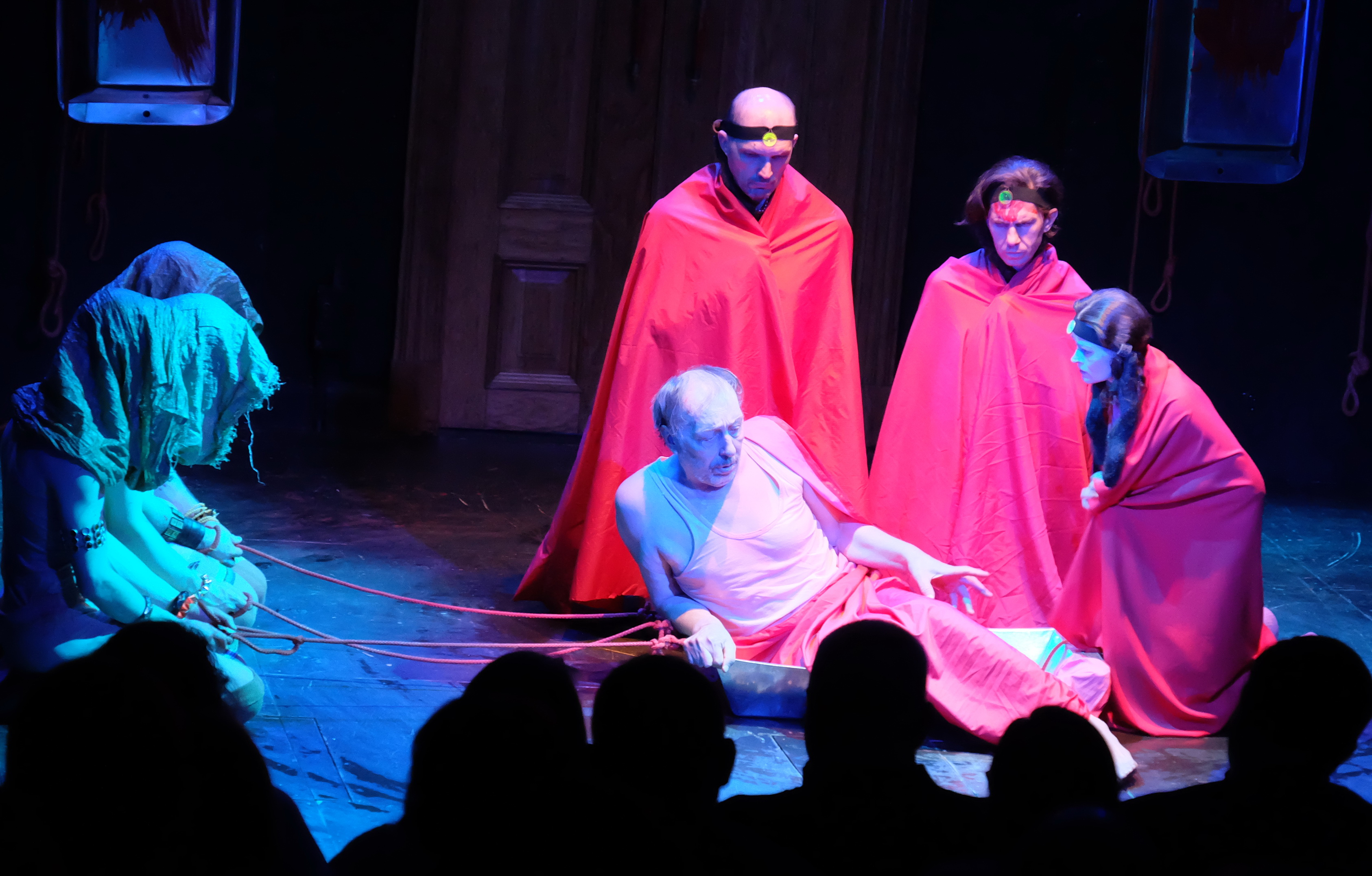
Kolyada in the title role of King Lear at Kolyada Theatre, Yekaterinburg, 2024

=== Directing ===
Kolyada's directorial debut took place in 1988 at the experimental theatre "Galërka" in Sverdlovsk, where he staged his own play Nine White Chrysanthemums. Over the following decades, he directed productions at several major Russian and European venues:

- Sverdlovsk Theatre of Drama (1994–2002): Oginsky's Polonaise, Canotier, Unsociable Sea, or A Ship of Fools, Chicken Blindness, Go Away-Go Away, Romeo and Juliet, and Persian Lilac.
- Sovremennik Theatre, Moscow (2000–2002): Go Away-Go Away (2000) and an adaptation of Celestina (2002).
- International venues: Staged works at Casa Nova (Essen, Germany), Teatr im. Stefana Jaracza (Łódź, Poland, 2014), Teatr Śląski (Katowice, Poland, 2015–2018), and the Vakhtangov Theatre in Moscow (2019).
- Kolyada Theatre: Directed the majority of the theatre's repertoire, focusing on his own plays and adaptations of classics with minimalist, highly stylised aesthetics.

Kolyada's directing style is characterised by sparse sets, intense emotional realism, and a focus on the psychological depth of provincial life. Critic John Freedman noted his use of simple objects and physical theatre to create "powerful effects with the barest of devices".

== Selected plays ==
The table below presents a curated selection of Kolyada's most influential and internationally produced works. It highlights plays that have defined his artistic evolution, premiered at major venues, or been translated and staged outside Russia.

For a comprehensive list of his dramatic works, see the Russian-language article or the 12-volume Collected Works (2015–2017).

Title (English / Russian)	Year	Premiere / Notable productions	Translations / International reach
Slingshot (Рогатка)	1989	World premiere: San Diego Repertory Theatre, USA (dir. Roman Viktyuk); Russian premiere: Leningrad State Theatre of Lenin Komsomol (1989)	Translated into English, German, French, Italian, Swedish, Spanish, Serbian, Bulgarian, Turkish, Japanese; staged in USA, Germany, UK, Sweden, Lithuania, Bulgaria, Yugoslavia
Playing Forfeits (Играем в фанты)	1986	First staged: Tomsk Theatre for Young Spectators (1987); performed in 90+ Russian theatres	German (Pfanderspiel, Hans Otto Theater, Potsdam, 1993), English (Game of Forfeits, Wall Theatre, Melbourne, 1995)
Oginsky's Polonaise (Полонез Огинского)	1993	Moscow: Theatre on Malaya Bronnaya (dir. Lev Durov, 1994), Roman Viktyuk Theatre (1994); Yekaterinburg Academic Theatre (1995)	German (Die Polonaise von Oginski, staged in Konstanz, Essen, Jena), English (Gate Theatre, London, 1996), Serbian (Yugoslav Drama Theatre, Belgrade, 1996)
Murlin Murlo (Мурлин Мурло)	1989	Sovremennik Theatre, Moscow (dir. Galina Volchek, 1991; revival dir. Sergey Garmash, 2009)	Staged in UK (Devon), Hungary (Kaposvár), Germany (Kiel, Stuttgart), Canada (Winnipeg), Serbia (Novi Sad)
Chicken (Курица)	1989	Rostov Academic Theatre (1991); adapted into a 1991 film (dir. Valentin Khovenko) starring Natalya Gundareva	Serbian; film screened internationally
Canotier (Канотье)	1992	Moscow: Theatre on Malaya Bronnaya (abridged, 1993); full version: Serov Drama Theatre (1994), Yekaterinburg Academic Theatre (1995, dir. Kolyada)	German (Der Canotier), Ukrainian
Persian Lilac (Персидская сирень)	1995	Part of the "Khrushchyovka" cycle; staged at Kolyada Theatre and other venues	German (Libellenfeuer)
Carmen Lives! (Кармен жива!)	2002	Opening production of Kolyada Theatre (2003)	Translated into multiple languages; cornerstone of the theatre's repertoire
Old Hare (Старая зайчиха)	2006	Sovremennik Theatre, Moscow (dir. Galina Volchek, 2006)	German (Katzenjammer)
Baba Chanel (Баба Шанель)	2010s	Staged at Vakhtangov Theatre (Moscow, 2019), Kazan Quality Theatre, Mari National Drama Theatre; international productions in Poland | Staged in Poland (Łódź, Katowice), referenced in international press	

=== Style and themes ===
Kolyada's plays are characterised by a blend of naturalism and poetic symbolism, often focusing on the lives of ordinary people in Russia's provinces. His early work was associated with chernukha — a term describing gritty, unflinching portrayals of social marginality — though his later plays evolved toward a more sentimental, humanistic tone.

He was among the first Russian playwrights to address homosexuality openly on stage, notably in Slingshot, which depicted a romance between a nurse and a wounded Afghan war veteran. His dialogue often incorporates colloquial speech and profanity, which was groundbreaking in Russian theatre of the 1990s.

=== Collections and publications ===
Kolyada's plays have been published in numerous collections, including:

- Plays for a Beloved Theatre (1994)
- Persian Lilac and Other Plays (1997)
- Carmen Lives (2002)
- Nosferatu (2002)
- Old Hare and Other Early Plays (2007)
- A 12-volume Collected Works (2015–2017), published in Yekaterinburg

Many of his plays were first published in the literary journal Ural, which he edited from 1999 to 2010.

== Awards and honours ==
Kolyada received numerous state and professional awards throughout his career, recognising his contributions to Russian theatre and dramaturgy.

=== State honours ===
- 2003 — Honored Art Worker of the Russian Federation — awarded by Presidential Decree for outstanding contributions to the arts.

=== Professional and literary prizes ===
- 1978 — Prize of the Sverdlovsk Regional Committee of the Komsomol for his role in Stop Malakhov!
- 1988 — Theatrical Life magazine prize for Best Debut in Dramaturgy (for the plays Barak and Playing Forfeits)
- 1993 — Prize of the Yekaterinburg branch of the Union of Theatre Workers of the Russian Federation for active work in dramaturgy
- 1996 — Prize of the Governor of Sverdlovsk Oblast for the play We Are Going, Going, Going to Distant Lands...
- 1997 — Bravo! festival prize, Best Director, for Russian National Post at the Sverdlovsk Academic Theatre of Drama
- 1999 — International Stanislavsky Prize (1997–1998 season) for his cycle of plays
- 2000 — Tatishchev and de Gennin Prize for contributions to the culture of the Urals
- 2002 — Pavel Bazhov Prize for the play collection Carmen Lives
- 2004 — Tsarskoye Selo Art Prize for outstanding achievements in theatre
- 2006 — Crystal Rose of Viktor Rozov prize, Literature category
- 2009 — Diaghilev Prize (Perm) for the Kolyada-Plays festival of contemporary dramaturgy
- 2018 — Prize of the Governor of Sverdlovsk Oblast for Outstanding Achievements in Literature and Art (for plays published in his Collected Works, 2015–2017)
- 2021 — Figaro Prize (Andrei Mironov National Acting Prize) for lifetime achievement in theatre

=== Festival recognition ===
Kolyada and his theatre were frequent winners at the regional Bravo! festival in Yekaterinburg:

- 2007 — Best Director for Hamlet
- 2008 — Special Jury Prize "Special View" for an unconventional approach to King Lear
- 2009 — Best Director in Dramatic Theatre for A Streetcar Named Desire
- 2010 — Best Director for Two Plus Two and Frontovichka
- 2011 — Best Director in Dramatic Theatre for Boris Godunov

== Public stance ==
Kolyada occasionally commented on political and social issues, and his public positions evolved over time.

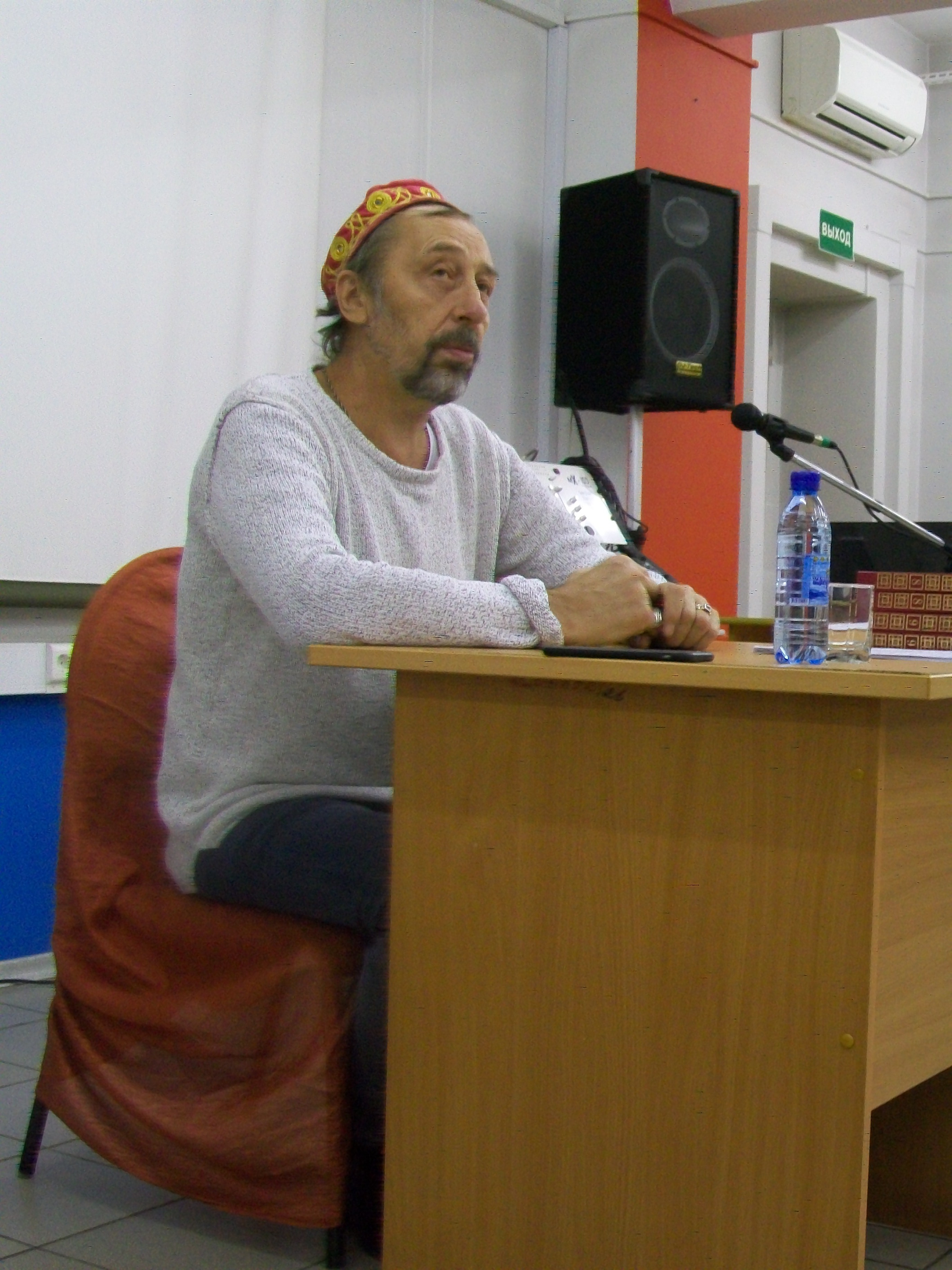
Kolyada at the «Biblionight» event at the Belinsky Library in Yekaterinburg, 2017

=== 2012 presidential election ===
In late 2011 and early 2012, Kolyada stated that he had voted for United Russia in the 2011 Russian legislative election and joined the Yekaterinburg "people's штаб" supporting Vladimir Putin's 2012 presidential campaign.

In January 2012, unknown individuals plastered the exterior of Kolyada Theatre with posters advertising a fictional performance titled Masquerade, described as "a play about a swindler and passionate love" starring Vladimir Putin, with Kolyada as director. Kolyada publicly condemned the action, stating that he had not authorised the posters and that the actual premiere of his adaptation of Masquerade was scheduled for after the election. The play eventually premiered on 20 March 2012, after the election.

Later in 2012, Kolyada was appointed to the Public Chamber of Sverdlovsk Oblast, where he chaired the commission on culture.

=== Support for Kirill Serebrennikov (2017) ===
In August 2017, Kolyada publicly expressed support for theatre director Kirill Serebrennikov, who had been placed under house arrest on fraud charges widely perceived by the artistic community as politically motivated.

=== Public Council of the State Duma on Culture (2019) ===
In June 2019, at the opening of the Ural Theatre Forum in Yekaterinburg, Elena Yampolskaya, head of the State Duma Committee on Culture, invited Kolyada to join the Duma's Public Council on Culture, stating that the council needed "people who openly express their point of view without bowing to anyone". Kolyada accepted the invitation, despite noting his disagreement with Yampolskaya over a critical review she had written about his 2016 production Old-World Love.

=== Position on the "Special Military Operation" (2022) ===
Following the launch of Russia's special military operation in Ukraine in February 2022, Kolyada was in the midst of staging his adaptation of Gogol's Taras Bulba at Kolyada Theatre. According to interviews, he gathered the company and stated:

...we are not closing the theatre, we will continue working. The stage is our battlefield. We do not engage in politics. We do not hold rallies. Our focus is the Human Being. Theatre exists not in the space of politics, but in the space of culture and morality.

The production of Taras Bulba premiered in May 2022 and remained in the theatre's repertoire.

=== 2024 Moscow tour cancellation ===
In November 2024, Kolyada Theatre was scheduled to hold its traditional January festival in Moscow at the Theatre Center "Na Strastnom". However, shortly before the tour, "competent authorities" reportedly requested that actor Oleg Yagodin be removed from all performances, citing an administrative fine he had received for allegedly discrediting the Russian Armed Forces.

Kolyada declined to remove Yagodin, stating: "We do not abandon our own." As a result, the theatre cancelled the Moscow festival. The Theatre Center "Na Strastnom" announced the cancellation to ticket-holders as being due to "technical reasons".

== Death and legacy ==
=== Final illness and death ===
On 25 February 2026, Kolyada was hospitalised in serious condition at City Hospital No. 1 in Yekaterinburg. He was placed in the intensive care unit and induced into a medically induced coma due to bilateral pneumonia and complications from chronic health conditions.

Kolyada died on 2 March 2026 in Yekaterinburg at the age of 68. The cause of death was not officially disclosed beyond the reported complications from pneumonia.

=== Funeral and memorials ===
A public farewell ceremony was held on 5 March 2026 at Kolyada Theatre in Yekaterinburg, attended by colleagues, students, and members of the public. Following an Orthodox funeral service, Kolyada was buried at Shirokorechenskoye Cemetery in Yekaterinburg.

=== Legacy ===
Kolyada's influence on Russian theatre extends beyond his own plays. As founder of the Ural School of Dramaturgy, he mentored a generation of playwrights whose works continue to be staged in Russia and internationally.

His theatre, Kolyada Theatre, continues to operate in Yekaterinburg under the artistic direction of his former students and company members, maintaining the repertoire of his plays and the aesthetic principles he developed.

Kolyada's literary legacy was formally recognised during his lifetime through the publication of a 12-volume Collected Works (2015–2017), a rare honour for a contemporary playwright. His plays remain in active repertoire at theatres across Russia, Europe, and North America, with new productions and translations continuing to appear.

Several obituaries and cultural commentaries described Kolyada as a defining figure of post-Soviet Russian drama. E1.ru referred to him as "the sun of Russian dramaturgy", while international observers noted his role in making Yekaterinburg a centre for contemporary theatre.
