= Anti-Booker prize =

Russian literary award

The Anti-Booker prize (Russian: Антибукер) was a Russian literary award that existed between 1995 and 2001. Established by newspaper Nezavisimaya Gazeta using money of Boris Berezovsky. Its name refers to British-sponsored Russian Booker and differences are:

- prize was to be one dollar more than the Russian Booker
- not limited to novels, but has five nominations (also poetry, stageplays, literary critics and memoirs)
- current year's works were awarded.

== Judging panel ==
Judges included well-known journalists, editors, literary critics and artists:

- Andrei Vasilevsky, editor-in-chief of Novy Mir;
- Natalya Ivanova, assistant of editor-in-chief of Znamya;
- Andrei Volos, writer awarded at Anti-booker 98;
- Victor Toporov, literary critics and translator;
- Yevgeniy Rein, poet;
- Natalya Trauberg, translator;
- Alexander Guelman, author of many Soviet stageplays;
- Irina Kupchenko, People's Artist of the USSR;
- Oleg Tabakov, People's Artist of the USSR

et al.

== Winners ==
- 1995 – Aleksei Varlamov, Nativity (Рождение) (novel)
- 1996 – Dmitri Bakin (pseudónim), Country of origin (Страна происхождения) (novel)
  - – Sergey Gandlevsky, Holiday (Праздник) (poetry)
  - – Ivan Saveliev, Voyage at the edge (Путешествие на краю) (piece)
- 1997 – Dmitri Galkovsky, Infinite Dead-end (Бесконечный тупик) (novel) – Dmitri Galkovski declined the prize
  - – Timur Kibirov, Paráfrasis (Парафразис) (poetry)
  - – Oleg Bogayev, Russian popular post (Русская народная почта) (stageplay)
  - – Aleksandr Goldstein, Farewell to Narciss (Прощание с нарциссом) (literary critics)
- 1998 – Andrei Volos, Hurramabad (Хуррамабад) (novel)
  - – Maksim Amelin, cycle of poetry Follow Sumarokov with olive of victory (За Сумароковым с победною оливой) (poetry)
  - – Maksim Kurochkin, Ironwill (Стальова воля) (stageplay)
  - – Oleg Davydov, Demon of Solzhenitsyn (Демон Солженицына) (literary critics)
  - – Emma Gerstein, Moscow Memoirs (Мемуары)
  - – Marina Tarkovski, Shards of mirror (Осколки зеркала) (Memoirs)
- 1999 – no prose was awarded
  - – no poetry was awarded; prize was kept and later awarded Boris Ryzhy, From Sverdlovsk with love
  - – Evgeni Grishkovets, Notes of Russian voyager and Winter (Записки русского путешественника, Зима) (stageplays)
  - – Pavel Basinski, (literary critics)
  - – Aleksandr Ivanchenko, Bathing of red horse (poem without heroes), (Купание Красного коня (поэма без героев))
- 2000 – Boris Akunin Coronation, or the Last of the Romanovs (Коронация, или Последний из РОМАНОВ) (novel)
  - – Bajyt Kenzheiev, Girl from the morning dream (Снящаяся под утро) (poetry)
  - – Vasili Sigarev, Plasticine (Пластилин) (stageplay)
  - – Evgeni Yermolin, (literary critics)
  - – Aleksei Filippov, Diary of desperation and hope (Дневник отчаяния и надежды)
