= Alexei Tsvetkov (poet) =

Russian poet and essayist (1947–2022)

- Алексей Цветков
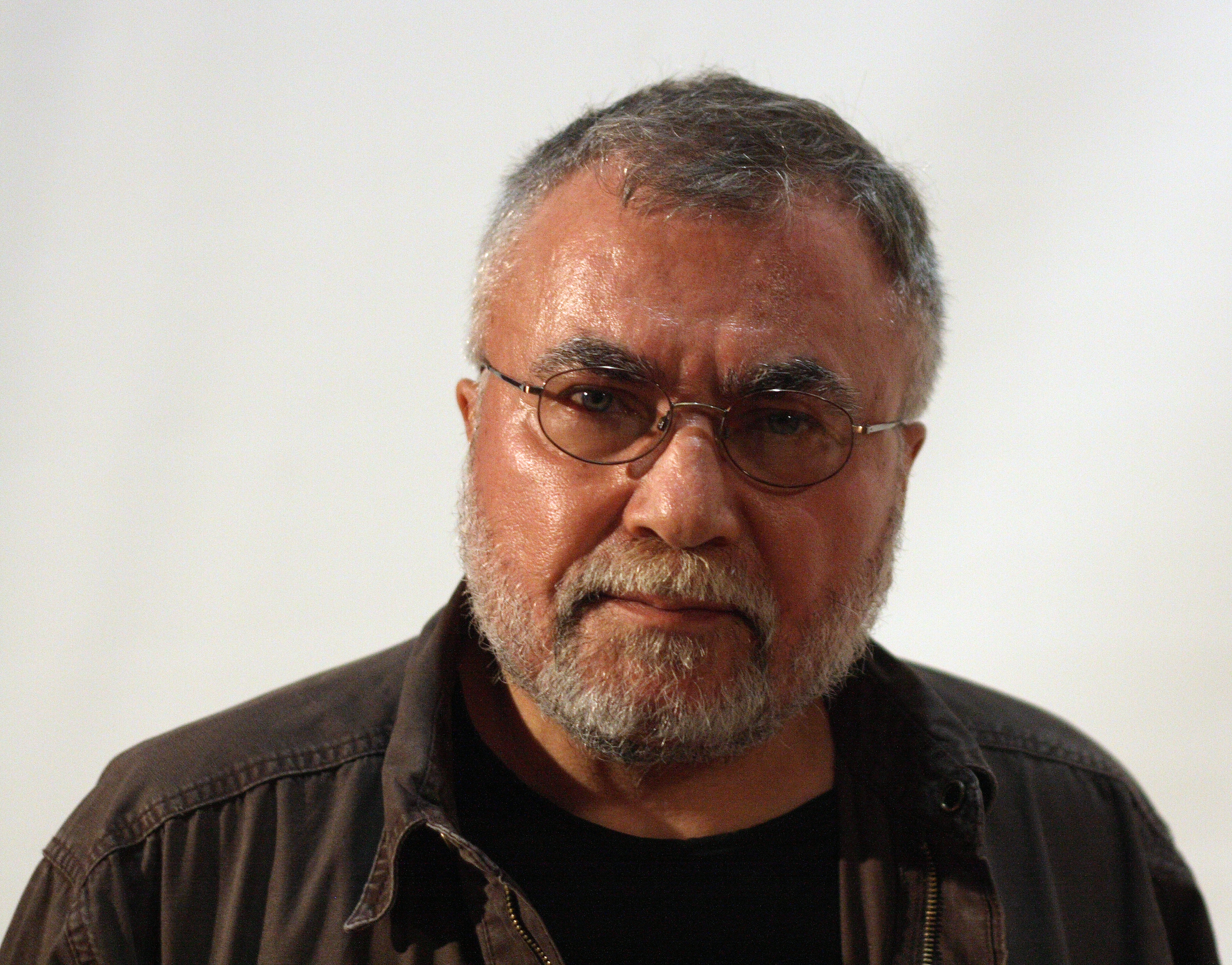
- Tsvetkov in 2009
- Born: 2 February 1947; Stanyslaviv, Ukrainian SSR, Soviet Union
- Died: 12 May 2022 (aged 75); Holon, Israel
- Occupation(s): Poet, essayist

Alexei Petrovich Tsvetkov (also spelled as Aleksei Cvetkov; Russian: Алексе́й Петро́вич Цветко́в; Ukrainian: Олексій Петрович Цвєтков, romanized: Oleksii Petrovych Tsvietkov; 2 February 1947 – 12 May 2022) was a Russian poet and essayist.

== Biography ==
Alexei Tsvetkov, Russian-language émigré poet, translator, and essayist, was born in Ivano-Frankivsk (formerly Stanislaviv), Ukraine, grew up in Zaporizhzhia and briefly studied chemistry at the Odesa University, then history (1965–1968) and journalism (1971–1974) at the Moscow State University. Together with Sergey Gandlevsky, Bakhyt Kenjeev, and Alexander Soprovsky he founded the unofficial group of poets Moscow Time. In 1975 he was arrested and deported from Moscow and in the same year emigrated to the United States. He edited the emigre newspaper Russkaya Zhizn (San Francisco, 1976–77). Then he entered the University of Michigan graduate school and in 1983 was awarded a PhD degree. Tsvetkov taught Russian language and literature at Dickinson College, Pennsylvania, then worked as an international broadcaster at the Voice of America radio station. From 1989 until 2007 he worked in the same capacity at the Radio Free Europe/Radio Liberty, first in Munich, later in Prague. For many years Tsvetkov lived and worked as a freelance writer based in New York City. In 2018 he made aliyah and lived in Bat Yam, Israel.

Alexei Tsvetkov died in Wolfson Hospital in Holon, Israel on 12 May 2022. He was interred in Yarkon Cemetery on 13 May.

== Creative output ==
In the late 80s he stopped writing poetry and turned to prose. The unfinished novel Just a Voice, an autobiography of a fictitious Roman soldier (only the adolescence is covered) reflects Tsvetkov's idea of the Roman civilization as one of the summits in the history of the humanity. Alexei Tsvetkov has been considered one of the finest poets of his generation by such critics as A. Skvortsov, A. Lehrman, G. Smith, A. Zorin and poets Andrey Voznesensky, Sergey Gandlevsky, and Mikhail Aizenberg.

In 2004, after a 17-year break, Tsvetkov turned back to poetry and within a year and a half prepared a new book of poetry. Alexei Tsvetkov also wrote and published poetry and essays in English. In 2007 he was awarded Andrei Bely Prize for poetry.

== Published works ==
- Sbornik p'es dlia zhizni solo (Collection of Pieces for Life Solo), Ann Arbor: Ardis, 1978.
- Sostoianie sna (Dream State), Ann Arbor: Ardis, 1981.
- Edem (Eden), Ann Arbor: Ardis, 1985.
- Stikhotvoreniia (Poems), St. Petersburg: Pushkinskii fond, 1996.
- Divno molvit'. Sobranie stikhotvorenii (Wonderful to Utter), St. Petersburg: Pushkinskii fond, 2001.
- Prosto golos (Just a Voice), Nezavisimaya Gazeta, Moscow, 2002.
- Bestiarii (Bestiary), Ekaterinburg: Evdokiia, 2004.
- Shekspir otdykhaet (Shakespeare at Rest), St. Petersburg: Pushkinskii fond, 2006.
- Imena liubvi (Names of Love), Moscow: Novoe izdatel'stvo, 2007.
- Edem i drugoe (Eden, and More), Moscow: OGI, 2007.
- Atlanticheskii dnevnik (The Atlantic Diary), Moscow: Novoe izdatel'stvo, 2007.
- Rovnyi veter (The Even Wind), Moscow: Novoe izdatel'stvo, 2008.
- Skazka na noch (Bedtime Story), Moscow: Novoe izdatel'stvo, 2010.
- Detektor smysla (Sense Detector), Moscow: ARGO-RISK; Knizhnoe obozrenie, 2010.
- Poslednii Kontinent (The Last Continent), Kharkiv: Folio, 2012.

== Other sources ==
- Lowe, David. Russian Writings Since 1953. A Critical History. Ungar, NY, 1987.
- Панн, Л. Нескучный сад. – Hermitage Publishers, 1998.
- Смит, Дж. Взгляд извне. Статьи о русской поэзии и поэтике. М.: Языки славянской культуры, 2002.
