= Euphoria (2006 film) =

- Film poster
- Directed by: Ivan Vyrypaev
- Written by: Ivan Vyrypayev
- Produced by: Giya Lordkipanidze; Aleksandr Shein
- Starring: Polina Agureeva; Maksim Ushakov; Mikhail Okunev
- Cinematography: Andrey Naidenov
- Edited by: Igor Malakhov
- Music by: Aidar Gainullin
- Distributed by: Pervoe Kinopartnerstvo; 2Plan2
- Release date: June 11, 2006
- Running time: 74 minutes
- Country: Russia
- Language: Russian

Euphoria (Russian: Эйфория) is a 2006 Russian drama/romance film directed by dramatist and director Ivan Vyrypaev. This drama, rightly classified as tragedy, exposes shocking truth about cultural and material poverty of Russian provincial Village. The film was nominated on Golden Lion at 2006 Venice Film Festival and won Little Golden Lion. In the same year Euphoria won the Kinotavr Special Prize of the Jury. At the Russian Film Festival past autumn 2007 in the United Kingdom it was appreciated also, became one of the most successful festival films.

The film stars Polina Agureeva and Mikhail Okunev.

== Plot ==
The story unfolds in the Eurasian Steppes. Vera lives with her husband Valery and their daughter in a house on the outskirts; at someone else's wedding she meets Pavel. They become instantly attracted to each other. The film begins with a scene of quarrel between Pavel and his friend, during which Pavel decides to go to Vera by all means, regardless of her husband. The two meet in the steppe, but dialogue does not work between them. Vera returns home where a misfortune occurs: a domestic dog bites her daughter by the finger. While the mother in a panic runs for help to the neighbors, Valery cuts off the wounded finger, gives the daughter vodka and kills the dog. At night, Vera goes to the steppe to bury the animal, where she encounters Pavel: he still wanders around their house. Together they bury the dog's corpse.

Vera returns and finds that her daughter feels worse and that her neighbors took her to the nearest hospital. Valery is asleep, having got drunk from vodka. Together with Valery, Vera runs to the bank of the river where they see Pavel's motor boat. He agrees to take them by the waterway to the hospital. During the trip Valery notes that Vera's dress is all soiled in the mud, and strikes her hard against the side of the boat. Pavel immediately stops the boat at the shore, throws Valery out of the boat and together with Vera steers away. Valery returns home, takes a rifle and ammunition, sets fire to the hut and goes out to find them. Meanwhile, Vera and Pavel become lovers. In the hospital, they do not find her daughter: it turns out that the neighbors have already taken her back home. Pavel offers Vera to take her daughter and stay with him. In the meantime Valery having gotten drunk from vodka, kills a cow on the field to see if he is able to kill a living being, and then sits on the shore in anticipation of Pavel's boat. The couple appears soon. Valery slays Pavel in several shots and injures Vera. Pavel protects the woman using his body as a shield and together they sail in the blood-filled boat with the still living Vera, before it begins to sink from the bullet holes.

== Reception ==
- Jankovic, Sasa (2006). "Always Young Orange Molodist and Russian Euphoria". FIPRESCI. Archived from the original on 2009-01-06.
- Kizilova, Anna (2006-12-18). "Euphoria For Visionaries". Russia-InfoCentre.
- Uhlich, Keith (2007-03-18). "Euphoria". Slant Magazine. Archived from the original on 2008-05-12.
