= Bakhyt Kenjeev =

Russian poet of Kazakh descent (1950–2024)

- Бахыт Кенжеев
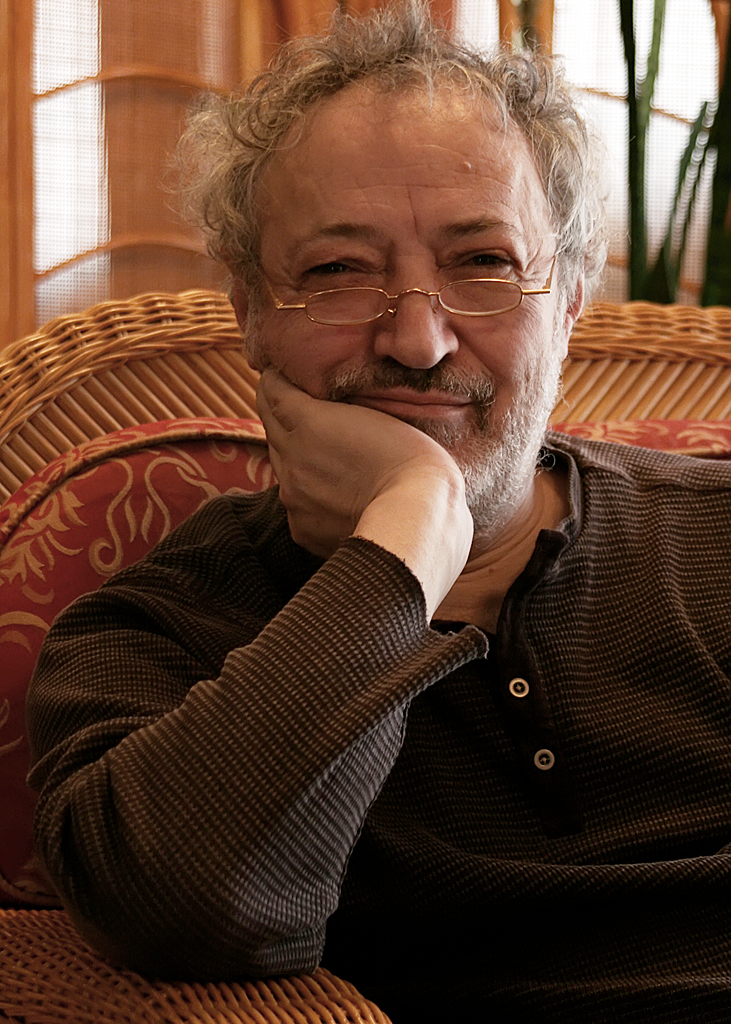
- Kenjeev in 2006
- Born: 2 August 1950; Shymkent, Kazakh SSR
- Died: 26 June 2024; New York City, United States
- Resting place: Green-Wood Cemetery
- Citizenship: Soviet Union; Canada
- Education: Moscow State University
- Occupations: Poet, writer

Bakhyt Shukurullaevich Kenjeev (Kenzheyev, Russian: Бахыт Шукуруллаевич Кенжеев; 2 August 1950 – 26 June 2024) was a Russian poet and writer of Kazakh descent.

== Biography ==
Kenjeev was born in Shymkent, Kazakh SSR on 2 August 1950. In 1953 his parents moved to Moscow. He graduated from Lomonosov Moscow State University with the equivalent of an M.S. degree in chemistry. In 1975, he was a founding member of the "Moscow Time" group of poets, with Alexei Tsvetkov, Alexander Soprovsky, and Sergey Gandlevsky. In 1982, Kenjeev immigrated to Canada; his first book of poetry was published by Ardis Publishing in 1984.

After Perestroika, Kenjeev frequently visited Russia, Ukraine, and other post-Soviet countries; he was a regular guest at numerous poetry festivals, including the Moscow Bienale, Kievskie Lavry, Leningradskie Mosty, Blue Metropolis Montreal festival, and the international poetry festival in Rotterdam, the Netherlands, and published several volumes of poetry. Many of his poems were translated into English, French, Kazakh, German, Swedish, and other languages.

Kenjeev lived in New York and Montreal. He died after a short illness on 26 June 2024, at the age of 73. He was buried at Green-Wood Cemetery in Brooklyn, New York.

== Selected awards ==
- 2003 Moscow-Transit Poetry Prize
- 2008 Russian Prize

== Works ==
=== English translations ===
- "Rain Pours Down in Rome, Repeating", West Branch, J. Kayes, Bucknell University
- Slava Muchnick, ed. (7 September 2009). Salt Crystals on an Axe: Twentieth-Century Russian Poetry in Congruent Translation: A Bilingual Mini-Anthology. Translator Alex Shafarenko. Ancient Purple Translations. ISBN 978-0-9563075-1-4.

=== Poetry ===
- Избранная лирика 1970—1981 (1984)
- Осень в Америке (1988) (ISBN 9781557790064)
- Стихотворения (1995)
- Сочинитель звезд: Книга новых стихотворений, М. 1997 (ISBN 5-85767-091-8)
- Снящаяся под утро: Книга стихотворений, М. 2000 (ISBN 5-900241-09-2)
- Из семи книг: Стихотворения, Независимая газета, М. 2000 (ISBN 5-86712-027-9)
- Невидимые: Стихи, М. 2004 (ISBN 5-94282-229-8)
- Вдали мерцает город Галич: Стихи мальчика Теодора, 2006 (ISBN 5-94128-126-9)
- Крепостной остывающих мест. М., 2008. (ISBN 9785969106710)
- Послания. — М., 2011. 640 с. (ISBN 978-5-9691-0514-0)
- Сообщение. — М., 2012. (ISBN 978-5-699-54601-5)
- Странствия и 87 стихотворений. К., 2013. (ISBN 978-966-2449-32-7)
- Довоенное: Стихи 2010—2013 годов. М., 2014.
- Позднее: Книга стихов. СПб., 2016.
- Элегии и другие стихотворения. М., 2018.

=== Novels ===
- Плато (1992)
- Иван Безуглов. Мещанский роман (1993)
- Золото гоблинов: Романы («Младший брат», «Золото гоблинов»), Независимая газета, М 2000, (ISBN 5-86712-101-1)
