= Van Goghs =

- Directed by: Sergey Livnev
- Written by: Sergey Livnev
- Produced by: Sergey Bobza; Andrey Korobov; Sergey Livnev; Max Pavlov; Igor Pronin
- Starring: Aleksei Serebryakov; Daniel Olbrychski; Elena Koreneva; Polina Agureeva; Natalya Negoda
- Cinematography: Yuri Klimenko
- Edited by: Ernest Aranov; Aleksei Bobrov
- Music by: Leonid Desyatnikov; Aleksei Sergunin
- Production companies: Leopolis; Forma Pro Films
- Distributed by: Exponenta Film
- Release date: June 2018 (KinoTavr Film Festival)
- Running time: 103 minutes
- Countries: Russia; Latvia; United Kingdom
- Language: Russian

Van Goghs (Russian: Ван Гоги, romanized: Van Gogi) is a 2018 drama film written, co-produced and directed by Sergey Livnev. It stars Aleksei Serebryakov and Daniel Olbrychski.

== Plot ==
The film tells about a lonely artist Mark, returning to Latvia to his own father after a long stay abroad. At home, Mark discovers many new things for himself, gets answers to questions that do not give him peace of mind all his life.

== Cast ==
- Aleksei Serebryakov as Mark
- Daniel Olbrychski as Victor
- Elena Koreneva as Irina
- Polina Agureeva as Masha
- Natalya Negoda as Tanya
- Avangard Leontiev as Veniamin
- Svetlana Nemolyaeva as Toma
- Olga Ostroumova as Ludmila
- Evgeniy Tkachuk as Young Victor
- Sergey Dreyden as Masha's grandfather
- Anna Kamenkova as Masha's mother

== Awards ==
Sergey Livnev's film awarded prizes of festival Kinotavr and Russian Guild of Film Critics.
