= Russian Little Booker Prize =

The Russian Little Booker Prize (Малая Букеровская премия or Малый Букер) was an annual prize awarded in 1992-2001 for a nominated genre of writing. It was established in 1992 as part of the Russian Booker Prize. In 2000 it separated from the Russian Booker and became independent. The prize was founded by Francis Greene (son of Graham Greene), whose sponsorship was anonymous until 2000. The nominations differed every year, to complement the Russian Booker which is awarded for novels only.

The mission of the Little Booker was to identify and encourage the most interesting and modern tendencies in Russia's literary life. Up until 2000 Russian Little Booker was awarded at the Russian Booker prize ceremonies. In 2001 it was awarded at the Non-Fiction Book Fair in Moscow.

The prize award was 4000 GBP.

== The Public Board ==
The Public Board of the Little Booker included:

1. Nikolai Aleksandrov ("Ekho Moskvy" radio station)

2. Aleksandr Gavrilov ("Ekslibris" newspaper)

3. Aleksandr Ivanov

4. Dmitri Prigov

5. Natalia Perova ("Glas" magazine)

Ilia Kukulin served as consultant.

== Recipients ==
1992 - Magazines Solo (Moscow) and Vestnik novoi literatury (Sankt-Peterburg) for the best magazine of literary debuts

1993 - Victor Pelevin (Sinii fonar) for the year's best book of short stories

1994 - Volga (Saratov) for the Russia's best provincial magazine

1995 - Rodnik (Riga) and Idiot (Vitebsk) for the best Russian-language literary magazine published in Russia's neighboring countries

1996 - Sergei Gandlevskii (Trepanatsiia cherepa) for the best first book in prose

1997 - Mikhail Gasparov (Izbrannye stat'i), Alexander Goldstein (Rasstavanie s Nartsissom) for a historical and philosophical study of Russian literature

1998 - Emma Gerstein (Memuary, later translated to English as Moscow Memoirs), Mikhail Bezrodnyi (Konets tsitaty) for a memoir and an autobiography dealing with Russia's literary scene

1999 - Vladimir Bibikhin (Novyi renessans) for an essay that contributed significantly to the development of the genre

2000 - "Iuriatin" Foundation (Perm) for a literary project

2001 - Viktor Golyshev (translation of Ian McEwan's Amsterdam) for translation of a novel
