= TUTA Theatre =

Chicago theater

TUTA Theatre or The Utopian Theatre Asylum is a nonprofit theater company in Chicago.

TUTA was established in 1995 in Washington, D.C., and its mission is "to engage the American audience with relevant theatre challenging in both form and content." TUTA has produced and created multiple critically acclaimed shows, including Uncle Vanya, Tracks, and It's Only the End of the World.

A small Chicago theater company finding its niche in bringing Eastern European and other international influences into the American theater scene, the company is run by Artistic Director Zeljko Dukich and has a board that boasts numerous influential theaterpersons in the American theater scene.

For the 2008–2009 season, TUTA produced two plays: November's William Shakespeare's The Most Excellent and Lamentable Tragedy of Romeo and Juliet (the production Time Out Chicago called "the fall show we're most excited about") and spring's Maria's Field, written by Oleg Bogaev, which the Chicago Reader Recommended saying "the acting is emotionally precise, and the superb scenic, lighting, costume, and sound designs create a realistic environment for the play's poetic ruminations".
