= Elena Gremina =

Russian writer and playwright

Elena Anatolievna Gremina
- Елена Анатольевна Гремина
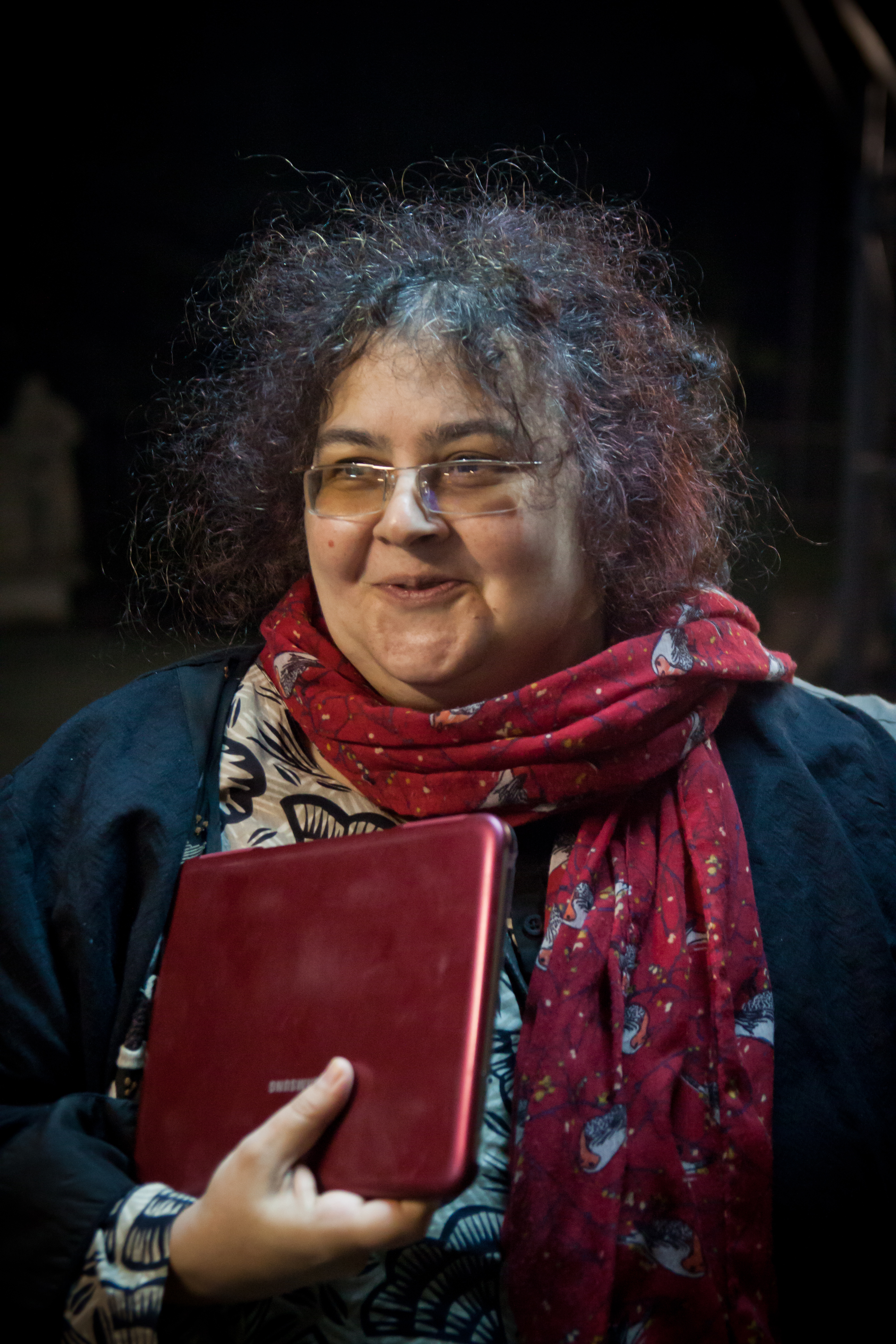
- Elena Gremina in 2015
- Born: 20 November 1956; Moscow, Soviet Union
- Died: 16 May 2018 (aged 61); Moscow, Russia
- Education: Maxim Gorky Literature Institute
- Occupations: Writer, playwright
- Spouse: Mikhail Ugarov 1993–2018
- Relatives: Anatoly Grebnev (father); Galina Mindadze (mother)
- Writing career
- Language: Russian
- Years active: 1983–2018
- Literary movement: New Drama

Elena Anatolievna Gremina (20 November 1956 – 16 May 2018) was a Russian writer and playwright who was one of the founders of the documentary theatre Teatr.doc. The fact-based approach to creating theatre that Gremina fostered made Teatr.doc a prominent place in the Moscow theatre scene and the New Drama movement in Russian theatre.

== Early life ==
Elena Grebneva was born on 20 November 1956 in Moscow, Soviet Union, to Georgian translator Galina Mindadze and playwright Anatoly Grebnev. At an early age, Elena would write protests in verse, such as an early piece about children being prevented from seeing a film. She later adopted the surname Gremina, a combination of her parents' surnames so as to be able to write without being compared to them. Gremina studied at the Maxim Gorky Literature Institute to become a playwright.

== Career ==
Gremina's first production was performed in 1983, but she only came to prominence in the 1990s after her plays were performed at the Moscow Pushkin Drama Theatre and she won awards from Westdeutscher Rundfunk. A favoured subject matter of Gremina in this period was conflicted women of history. Gremina married playwright Mikhail Ugarov in 1993. Together with her husband and father, she created the television series, St. Petersburg Secrets.

In 2000 Gremina and Ugarov, among other Russian authors, attended playwriting masterclasses that were conducted in Moscow by a group of Royal Court Theatre artists including Stephen Daldry, Elyse Dodgson, Ramin Gray, and James Macdonald. When Gremina and Ugarova heard Dodgson talk about the use of verbatim techniques in theatre to present factual stories on the stage, they decided that it was a way to reconnect Russian theatre with the public in their home country. In 2001 Gremina and Ugarov produced Russia’s first documentary theatre festival, and in February 2002 the duo, together with several other Russian playwrights, started Teatr.doc in 2002, and soon began to present performances based on current events.

The performances became more political in nature, which resulted in Gremina and her husband being visited by the police and having equipment confiscated. One such piece written by Gremina was on the death of Sergei Magnitsky, an anticorruption lawyer. After a police raid of Teatr.doc in 2015 that saw three members of the production temporarily arrested and sets destroyed, Gremina was summoned to the Ministry of Culture where she was threatened with further raids.

Ugarov died following a heart attack in April 2018. Gremina died six weeks later, also from a heart attack.
