= Polina Agureeva =

Russian actress (born 1976)

- Полина Агуреева
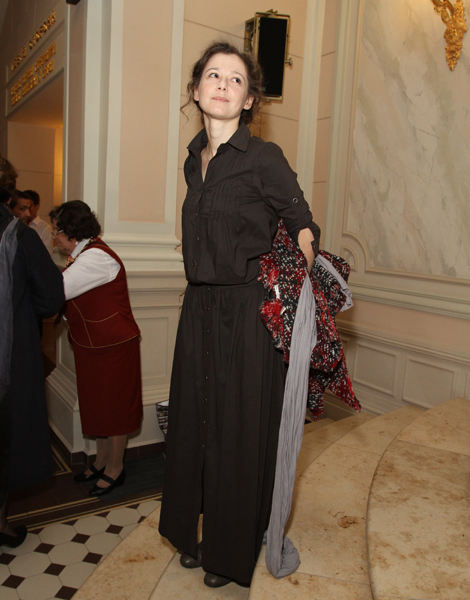
- Polina Agureeva, guest of the 2012 Golden Mask Festival.
- Born: Polina Vladimirovna Agureeva; 9 September 1976 (age 50); Volgograd, Russian SSR, Soviet Union (now Russia)
- Occupation: Actress
- Years active: 1997–present
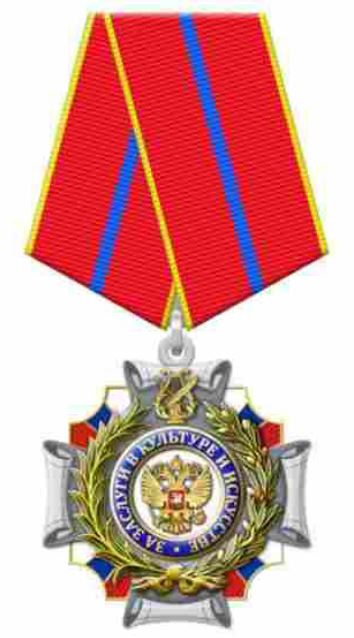
- Awards

Polina Vladimirovna Agureeva (Russian: Поли́на Влади́мировна Агуреева; born 9 September 1976) is a Russian stage actress, singer, and laureate of the State Prize of the Russian Federation.

She is the winner of national awards Seagull Award (2000), State Prize (2001), Kinotavr (2004), Golden Mask (2009) and Golden Eagle Award (2013).

== Career ==
Agureeva's style has been praised for her versatility in portraying various roles in different settings, especially in her tragic and dramatic roles.

In 2003–2007, she was married to director Ivan Vyrypaev. She has a son, Pyotr (born in 2005).

== Filmography ==
- 2004 Long Farewell as Lyalya Telepnyova
- 2006 Euphoria as Vera
- 2007 Liquidation (miniseries) as Tonya Tsarko
- 2009 Isayev (TV series) as Anna
- 2010 Who Wasn't There as Katya
- 2012 Life and Fate (miniseries) as Yevgenia Shaposhnikova
- 2014 Kuprin. Pit (miniseries) as Tamara
- 2014 Goodbye, My Love! (TV Series) as Margarita Sotnikova
- 2014 Sex, Coffee, Cigarettes as She
- 2016 Collector as Tamara (voice)
- 2019 Van Goghs as Masha
- 2026 Angels of War as Nina
