= Aleksandr Ivanchenko =

Russian writer (1946–2026)

Aleksandr Lvovich Ivanchenko (Russian: Александр Львович Иванченко; 20 June 1945 – 1 June 2026) was a Russian writer.

== Life and career ==
Aleksandr Lvovich Ivanchenko was born in the city of Krasnoturyinsk, Sverdlovsk Oblast on 20 June 1945. He worked in many trades such as locksmith, firefighter, etc. He also served as a soldier in the Soviet Army in the 1960s.

He published his first works in 1976, a story titled "Fisheye" and a novel named Solar Plexus. His novel Monogram was nominated for the inaugural Russian Booker Prize. He also won the Antibooker Prize for his work "Bathing the Red Horse". His work was promoted by the literary magazine Ural and is often associated with Russian postmodernism.

Ivanchenko was a member the Writers' Union of the USSR, the Union of Russian Writers, Russian PEN Center, etc.

Ivanchenko died on 1 June 2026, at the age of 80.
