= Maxim Amelin =

Russian poet (Born: 1970)

- Максим Амелин
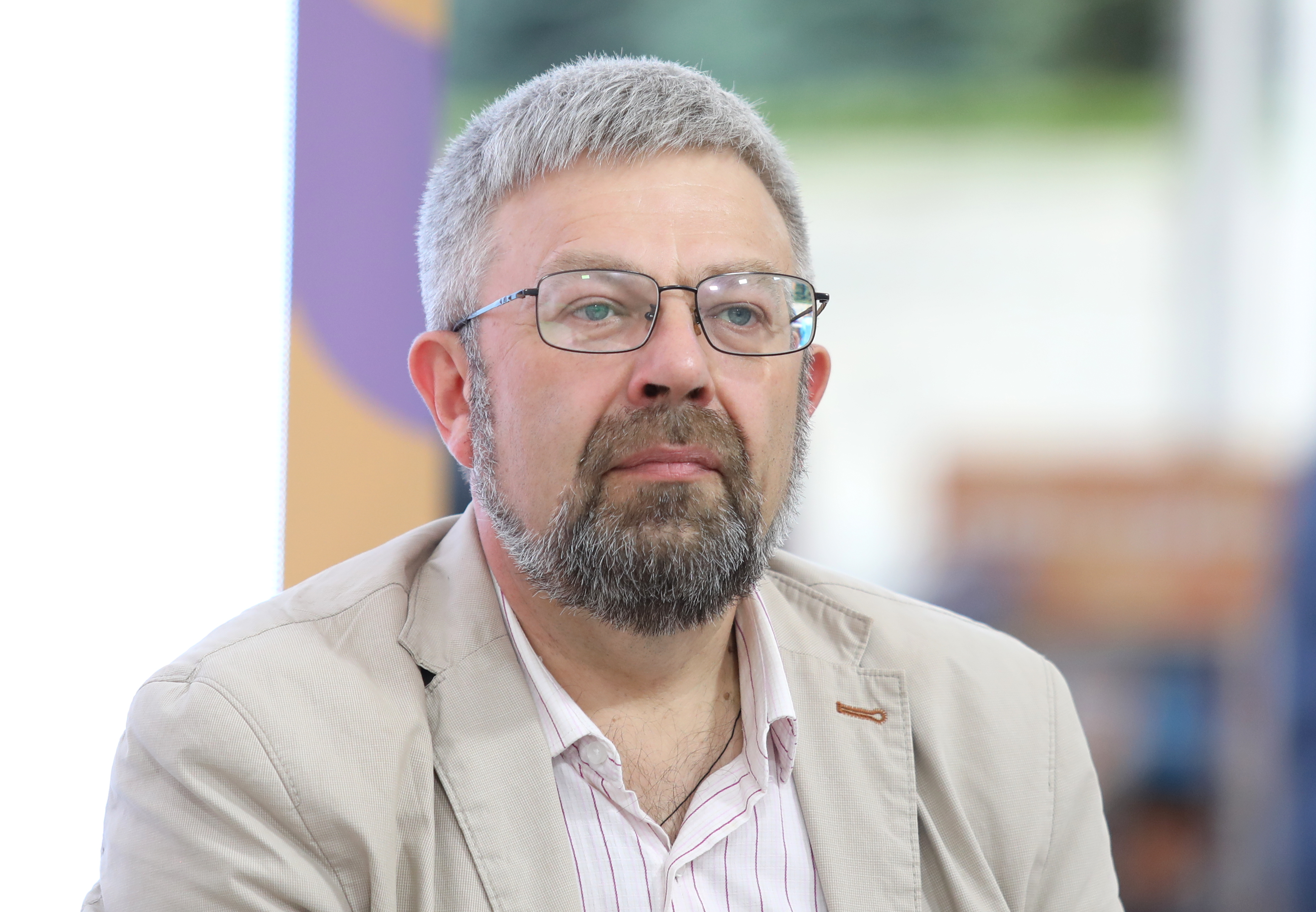
- Amelin in 2024
- Born: January 7, 1970 (age 56); Kursk, Soviet Union
- Citizenship: Russia
- Education: Maxim Gorky Literature Institute
- Occupations: Poet, critic, essayist
- Awards: Moscow Account

Maxim Albertovich Amelin (Russian: Максим Альбертович Амелин; born 7 January 1970) is a Russian poet, critic, essayist, editor, and translator. He was born in Kursk, Soviet Union, where he graduated from the Kursk Commercial College (Курский торговый техникум) and did his military service in the Soviet Army. He studied in the Maxim Gorky Literature Institute in Moscow from 1991 to 1994, where he worked with Olesya Nikolayeva. He was commercial director and director of the St. Petersburg publishing house Symposium from 1995 to 2007 and has been the Editor-in-Chief of the Moscow publishing house OGI since 2008. He is married to the poet Anna Zolotaryova and lives in Moscow.

Tatyana Bek was the first to define his style, calling him an "archaist-innovator." His poetry is influenced by classical Greek and Roman poetry and by Russian poetry of the 18th century. He has translated the works of Catullus, Pindar, and Homer, as well as poetry from Georgian, Italian, Ukrainian, and other languages.

Amelin has edited and published the works of several lesser-known Russian writers, including Dmitry Ivanovich, Count Khvostov (1757-1835), Aleksandr Yefimovich Izmaylov (1779-1831), Sergey Yevgenyevich Neldikhen (1891-1942), Anna Petrovna Bunina (1774-1829), and Vasily Petrovich Petrov (1736-1799).

In 2017, Amelin was awarded the Poet Prize, a national Russian prize that has been awarded since 2005.

== Poetry (in Russian) ==
- (Cold Odes) Холодные оды — М.: Symposium, 1996.
- Dubia — СПб.: Ина-Пресс, 1999.
- (The Horse of the Gorgon) Конь Горгоны — М.: Время, 2003.
- (Bent Speech) Гнутая речь — М.: Б. С. Г.-Пресс, 2011.
- (The Joyous Science, or The True Story of the Famous Bruce, Composed in Verse from the Accounts of Several Eyewitnesses) Веселая наука, или Подлинная повесть о знаменитом Брюсе, переложенная стихами со слов нескольких очевидцев — М.: Август, 2018.

== Poetry Collections (translated) ==
- Maksim Amelin, Libro Inverso, traduzione di Marilena Rea, Queen Kristianka Edizioni, 2024.
- Maksim Ameljin. Gorgonin konj / Prijevod s ruskog i bilješke Žarko Milenić. Brčko: Kniževny klub, 2012.
- Maxim Amelin. Arkadentempel. Gedichte / Übersetzt von Alexander Nitzberg. Vienna: Klever Verlag, 2013.
- Maxim Amelin & Irina Iermakova. Esperit i fang / Edició a cura Nuria Busquet & Ricard San Vicente. Barcelona: Institució de les Lletres Catalanes, 2015.
- Maxim Amelin. The Joyous Science: Selected Poems of Maxim Amelin. Translated by Derek Mong and Anne O. Fisher. Buffalo: White Pine Press, 2018.

== Translations by Maxim Amelin ==
- (Catullus. Selected lyrics.) Катулл. Избранная лирика / Перевод, примечания. — СПб.: Алетейя, 1997; 2-е изд., 1999.
- (Carmina Priapea.) «Приапова книга» / Статья, перевод, примечания. — М.; СПб.: Летний сад, 2003.
- (Catullus. Poems.) Катулл. Стихотворения / Статья, перевод, примечания. — М.: Текст, 2010.

== Edited anthologies (in Russian) ==
- (Nine Dimensions. An Anthology of Contemporary Russian Poetry) Девять измерений. Антология новейшей русской поэзии. / Сост.: Б. Кенжеев, М. Амелин, П. Барскова, С. Тимофеев, Д. Воденников, Д. Давыдов, Д. Кузьмин, К. Маренникова, М. Маурицио, И. Кукулин. — М.: Новое литературное обозрение, 2004.
- (The Best Poems of 2010) Лучшие стихи 2010 года. Поэтическая антология / Составитель и автор. — М.: ОГИ, 2012
- (An Anthology of New Georgian Poetry) Антология новой грузинской поэзии / Сосоставитель и переводчик. — М.: ОГИ, 2014
- (Contemporary Literature of the Peoples of Russia. Poetry [in 57 languages]) Современная литература народов России. Поэзия [на 57 языках] / Ответственный редактор и переводчик. — М.: ОГИ, 2017

== Honors and awards ==
- The Poet Prize (2017) - "[Amelin] is an archaist-innovator who has given new voice to forgotten Russian poets of the 18th and early 19th centuries, not to mention Catullus, Homer, and Pindar."
- The Novy Mir Prize (1998, 2015)
- The Solzhenitsyn Prize (2013) — “for innovative experimentation that has expanded the limits and possibilities of lyric poetry, for cultivating the diverse traditions of Russian poetry, and for extensive educational efforts to promote belles-lettres”
- The Moscow Reckoning Special Prize (2012)
- The Bunin Prize (2012)
- The Znamya Prize (2010)
- The Moscow Reckoning Grand Prize (2004)
- The Antibooker (1998)
