= Emma Gerstein =

Emma Grigorievna Gerstein
- Э́мма Григо́рьевна Герште́йн
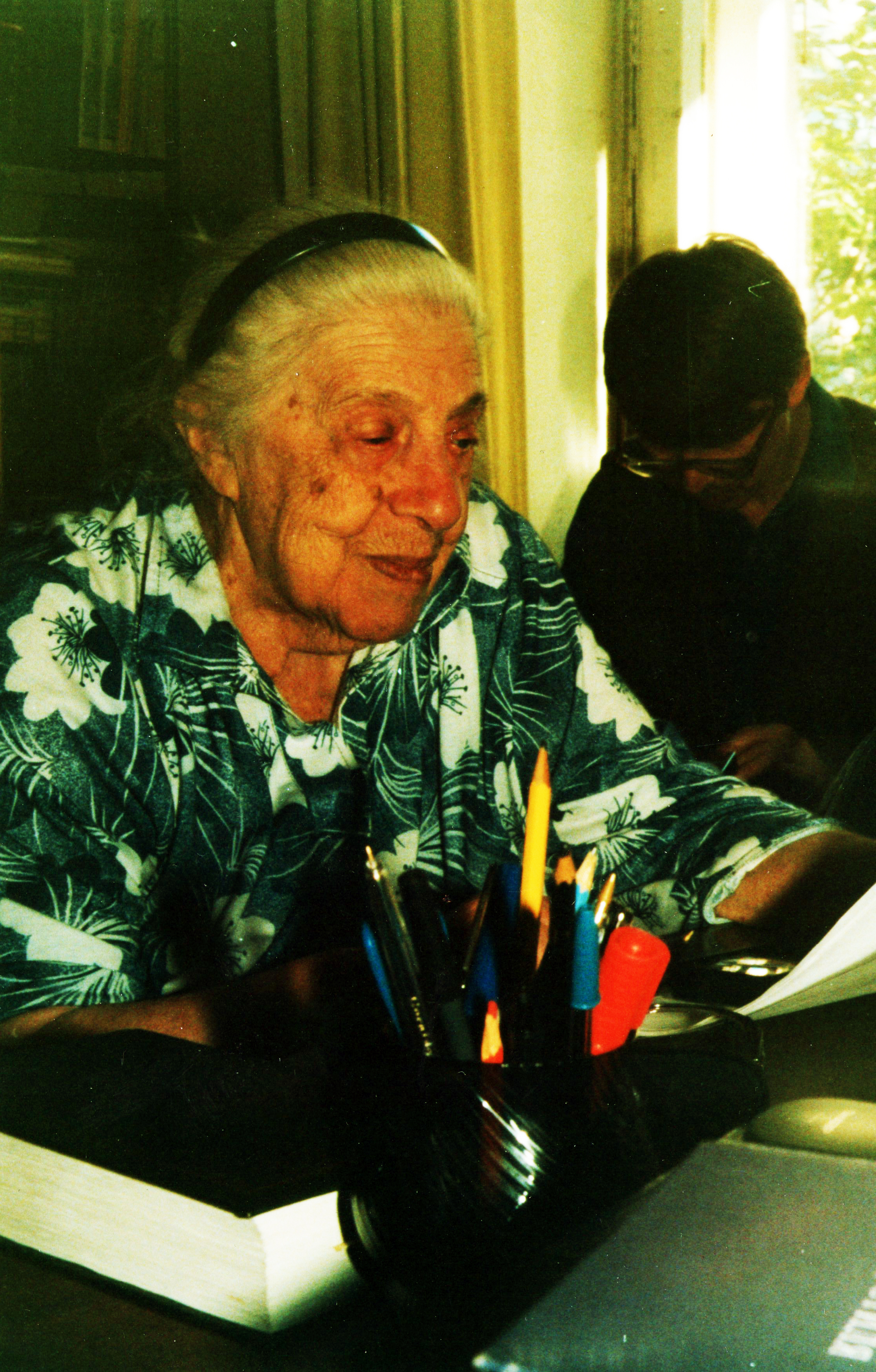
- Born: 12 October 1903 (Julian); Dvinsk
- Died: 29 June 2002 (aged 97); Moscow
- Resting place: Vagankovo cemetery
- Education: Moscow State University
- Writing career
- Language: Russian
- Notable work: Moscow Memoirs
- Notable awards: Russian Little Booker Prize; Anti-Booker prize

Emma Grigorievna Gerstein (Note: This is the spelling English-language edition of Moscow Memoirs uses; sometimes spellings Gershteyn and Gershtein are used) (Rus.: Э́мма Григо́рьевна Герште́йн, born October 25 (12 O.S.), 1903 Dvinsk, Russia - died 29 June 2002, Moscow, Russia) was a Soviet and Russian historian and literary critic, author of works on the works of Mikhail Lermontov and memoirist.

== Life ==
She was born on October 12 (old calendar), 1903 in Dvinsk, into the family of a physician Grigory Moiseevich Gershtein (1870-1943) and Isabella Evseevna Group (1874-1961). The family had four children. In the 1920s, her father worked as the chief physician of the Semashko hospital in Moscow, and then as a professor-consultant at the Kremlin hospital.

She graduated from the Dvina gymnasium (1920), entered the philosophy department of Moscow University, listened to lectures by Nikolai Berdyaev, Ivan Ilyin, and Alexandre Kiesewetter. She changed several faculties; in the winter of 1924/1925 she graduated from a three-year (simplified) course in the department of language and literature at the Faculty of Social Sciences of Moscow State University. She worked at the newspaper "For Industrialization" (За индустриализацию, 1926-1927), and was a clerk in the Utilsyryo trust (Утильсырьё, 1927-1928). She graduated from typing courses (1929), and worked as the personal secretary of Olga Kameneva, in the "Krestyanskaya Gazeta".

In the late 1930s, with the support of Boris Eikhenbaum, she took up literary studies, studied Lermontov, mainly researching the "circle of sixteen" and its members, one of which Lermontov was. From 1936 and 1940 she analyzed the manuscript collections of the Literary, Historical Museums, the Lenin Library, and in 1946, TsGALI. From the mid-1940s she worked in the editorial office of Literary Heritage. Since 1965 she was a Member of the Union of Writers of the USSR.

In 1928, in the Uzkoye sanatorium near Moscow, she became closely acquainted with Nadezhda and Osip Mandelstam, and, after a while, with almost all the unofficial creative intelligentsia of that period, such as Marina Tsvetaeva, Boris Pasternak, Maria Petrovykh, as well as with other writers and scientists. She was closely acquainted with Anna Akhmatova, Lev Gumilyov and Nikolai Khardzhiev.

In 1998, her memoirs, later translated to English as Moscow Memoirs were published. For them she received the Russian Little Booker Prize and Anti-Booker Prize.

She is buried at the Vagankovo Cemetery.
