= Ivan Vyrypaev =

Russian playwright, actor, film and theatre director

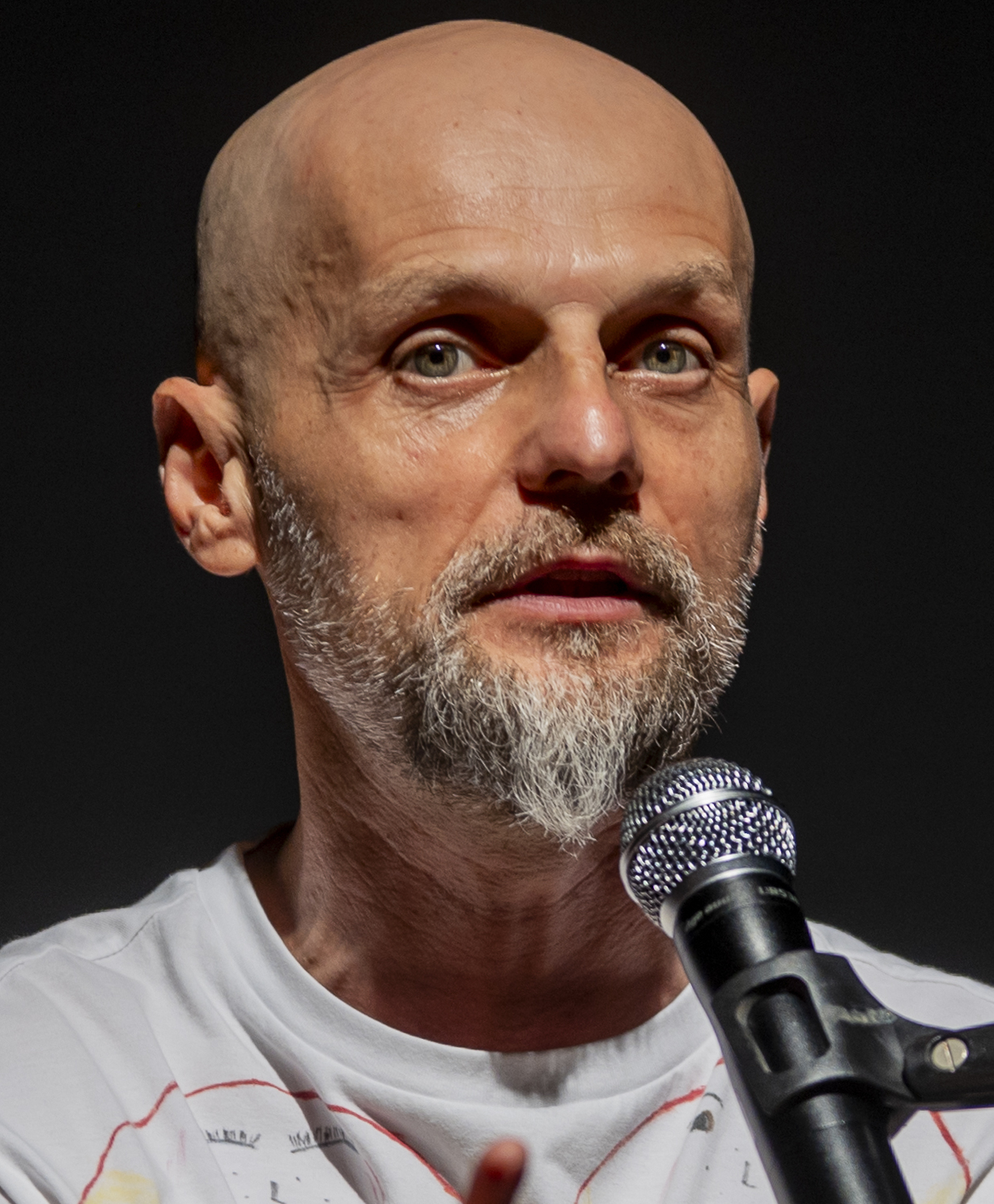
- Born: Ivan Aleksandrovich Vyrypaev; August 3, 1974 (age 52); Irkutsk, Soviet Union
- Citizenship: Russian Federation; Poland
- Occupations: Theatre director, Film director, screenwriter, playwright, actor, art director
- Years active: 1995–present
- Movement: New Drama
- Awards: Venice Film Festival, Stuckemarkt International Contemporary Drama Festival, Warsaw Film Festival, Rome Film Festival
- Website: http://www.vyrypaev.com

Ivan Aleksandrovich Vyrypaev (Russian: Ива́н Алекса́ндрович Вырыпа́ев; Polish: Iwan Wyrypajew; born August 3, 1974) is a Polish playwright of Russian descent, screenwriter, film director, actor and art director. He is a leading figure in the New Drama movement. Founder and general producer of the private Polish foundation WEDA PROJECT. Artistic Director and General Producer of the foundation for creative and spiritual development "Teal House" in Warsaw. Winner of numerous literary, theatrical and film awards, including the Venice Film Festival, Stuckemarkt International Contemporary Drama Festival, Warsaw Film Festival, Rome Film Festival and many others.

Ivan Vyrypayev's plays have been staged all over the world, from South Korea to the USA in more than 250 theaters. As a director, Vyrypayev has staged plays in theaters across Europe and the United States.

In 2019 Vyrypaev entered the top 10 most prominent playwrights of the world. He is also known as a film director, his film Euphoria got into the main competition of the Venice Film Festival and received the award of the "youth jury" "small golden lion" for the best film.

Since 2014 he has been living and working permanently in Poland together with his wife, prominent Polish actress Karolina Gruszka. Vyrypaev is known for his uncompromising stance on non-collaboration with the Russian state formulated after the Russo-Ukrainian War, which he denounced in the strongest of terms; his decision to donate all proceedings from the staging of his theatrical work in Russia to Ukraine has led to a comprehensive ban and a criminal case. Ivan Vyrypayev was arrested in absentia and sentenced in absentia to 8 years in prison for spreading false information about the Russian army (Article 207.3 of the Russian Criminal Code).

On July 3, 2026, he was awarded an honorary doctorate and professorship by the University of the Peloponnese in Greece.

== Biography ==
In 1995, Ivan graduated from the Irkutsk Theater School, after graduation he worked for one season as an actor in the Magadan Theater, then for two seasons as an actor in the Drama and Comedy Theater in Kamchatka. In 1998, founded the theater-studio "Space of the Game" in Irkutsk. In the same year, Ivan became a student at the Higher Theater School named after Shchukin, studying at the departments of "Drama Theater Director". In 1999–2001, Vyrypaev taught acting skills at the Irkutsk Theater School, on the course of Vyacheslav Kokorin.

In 2005, he created the Kislorod Movement agency for creative projects in the field of cinema, theater and literature.

In 2006-2013 — Art Producer of the Moscow Praktika theatre. 2013-2016 — Artistic Director of the Praktika Theater. In 2020-2021 — General Producer of the Okko Theater project, where he was producing and filming performances for shows presented at the Okko online platform. He taught at GITIS, the Moscow Art Theater Studio School, and the Warsaw Academy of Theater Arts.

Productions based on Vyrypayev's plays have been staged in Poland, Bulgaria, Great Britain, Hungary, Germany, Canada, Latvia, Lithuania, USA, Portugal, Romania, Slovakia, Slovenia, France, Czech Republic, and Estonia. Before Russia's invasion of Ukraine, 35 Ukrainian theaters were performing Ivan Vyrypayev's plays. Vyrypayev's texts have been translated into more than 30 languages and are publicly available on the writer's official website.

Since 2014 Vyrypayev has been living in Poland together with his wife, prominent Polish actress Karolina Gruszka. In May 2022, he announced that he renounced his Russian citizenship and received Polish citizenship.

On 17 May 2023 the Basmanny District Court of Moscow arrested Vyrypaev in absentia on the charges of "spreading fake news" about the Russian army. He was sentenced in absentia to 8 years in prison.

In summer 2023 Vyrypayev and Gruszka presented their non-profit project Teal House in Warsaw. The philosophy and methodology of the project is based on the fact that the full, integral development of all people occurs simultaneously on three levels: physical level, mental and intellectual level, spiritual level (energy, knowledge). Therefore, all activities and all projects such as art, education, and spiritual practices necessarily consist of the three basic levels mentioned above.

On July 3, 2026, during an official ceremony, he was awarded an honorary doctorate and professorship by the University of the Peloponnese in Greece for his outstanding contributions to contemporary theater and playwriting.

== Family ==
- First wife — actress Svetlana Ivanova-Sergeyeva. Son Gennady (born 1994).
- Second wife (2003–2007) — actress Polina Agureeva. Son Peter (born October 26, 2004).
- The third wife is the Polish actress Karolina Gruszka. Daughter (born 2012).

== Filmography ==
=== Actor ===
- 2002 — Killer's Diary as Ivan Azovsky
- 2006 — Bunker, or Underground Scientists as Guidon
- 2006 — Boomer. The Second Film as a bum in a cafe
- 2015 — Salvation as photographer

=== Film director ===
- 2006 — Euphoria
- 2009 — Oxygen
- 2009 — Feel (movie almanac "Short Circuit")
- 2012 — Delhi Dance
- 2015 — Salvation
- 2020 — Entertainment
- 2020 — UFO
- 2021 — World of beautiful butterflies
- 2021 — Research Study. New Constructive Ethics

=== Screenplays ===
- 2002 — Money
- 2006 — Boomer. The second film
- 2006 — Bunker, or Scientists Underground
- 2006 — Euphoria
- 2007 — Antonina Turned Back
- 2007 — The Best Time of the Year
- 2009 — Oxygen
- 2009 — Short circuit
- 2010 — Pure light
- 2012 — Delhi Dance
- 2015 — Salvation
- 2020 — UFO
- 2020 — Entertainment
- 2021 — World of beautiful butterflies
- 2021 — Research Study. New Constructive Ethics

== Producer ==
- 2020 — UFO
- 2020 — Entertainment
- 2021 — World of beautiful butterflies

== Theatre director ==
- Yu (original title, Irkutsk)
- Dreams (Irkutsk, Moscow)
- Macbeth (Irkutsk)
- The City Where I Am (Irkutsk)
- To Explain (Moscow Theatre School of Dramatic Art)
- Delhi Dance (National Theatre, Warsaw)
- July (National Theatre, Warsaw)
- Comedy (Praktika Theatre)
- Illusions (Praktika Theatre)
- Illusions (Stary Teatr, Kraków)
- Unbearably long embraces (Praktika Theatre)
- Illusions (Stary Teatr, Kraków)
- Marriage (Studio Theatre, Warsaw)
- Interview S-FBP 4408 (Bolshaya Dmitrovka, Moscow)
- Illusiones (El Pavón Teatro Kamikaze, Madrid). Directed by Miguel del Arco with Marta Etura, Daniel Grao, Alejandro Jato and Verónica Ronda.
- Boris Godunov (Bolshoi Theatre, Poznan)
- Diary of Zherebtsova Polina (Museum of the Uprising, Warsaw)
- Uncle Vanya (Polish Theater named after Arnold Shifman, Warsaw)
- 2019 — Disquet (Bolshoi Drama Theater named after G. A. Tovstonogov, Saint Petersburg)
- 2021 — 1.8 M (New Theatre, Warsaw)
- 2023 — Drunks (Lithuanian National Drama Theatre, Vilnius)

== Plays ==
- 1999 — Dreams
- 2000 — The City Where I Am
- 2001 — Valentine's Day
- 2001 — Karaoke box
- 2002 — Oxygen
- 2004 — Being No.2
- 2006 — July
- 2008 — To Explain
- 2010 — Delhi Dance
- 2010 — Comedy
- 2011 — Illusions
- 2011 — DREAMWORKS
- 2012 — Summer bees sting in November, too
- 2012 — Drunks
- 2012 — UFO
- 2013 — Shugar
- 2014 — What I learned from the snake
- 2014 — Unbearably long embraces
- 2015 — Line of the sun
- 2016 — Interview S-FBP 4408
- 2017 — Iranian Conference
- 2018 — Nancy
- 2019 — Disquiet
- 2020 — Entertainment
- 2021 — Research Study. New Constructive Ethics
- 2021 — World of beautiful butterflies
- 2023 — Cherry Man
