= Oleg Bogayev =

Russian writer (born 1970)

- Олег Богаев
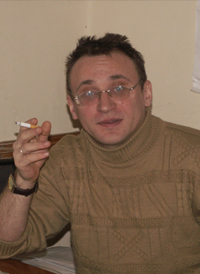
- Born: 1970 (age 55–56); Russia
- Education: Yekaterinburg State Theatre Institute
- Occupation: Playwright
- Writing career
- Language: Russian
- Notable work: The Russian National Postal Service (Русская народная почта)
- Notable awards: Anti-Booker Prize; Best Play at Russia's Golden Mask Festival
- Movement: New Drama

Oleg Anatolyevich Bogayev (Russian: Оле́г Анато́льевич Бога́ев; also transliterated as Bogaev or Bogaiev; born 1970) is a Russian playwright based in Yekaterinburg. He has been described by Moscow Times theatre critic John Freedman as "one of the first and best-known students to graduate from [Nikolai] Kolyada’s playwriting course at the Yekaterinburg State Theatre Institute." He is now on the faculty at the same school. Bogaev is also the editor of the Ural (Russian: Урал) literary magazine, a post he took over from his mentor Nikolai Kolyada in August 2010.

== Biography ==
Oleg Bogayev was born in 1970 in the city of Sverdlovsk (now called Yekaterinburg) in Russia. He writes of growing up as the Cold War gave way to the emergence of Perestroika, a "change from the decay of the empire to the birth of a new society." He cites the social turmoil of recent decades as useful for artistic product: "[What] I know is that Russia is just the right place for a playwright - with shattering of fates, conflicts, crumbling of hopes, clashes of ideas - all that I've seen and experienced."

Bogayev became interested in writing as a teenager, spurred by what he describes as "two tragedies": first love and the death of his father. He began writing poems and short stories. He worked in theatre as a set and lighting designer; he became interested in writing plays after being exposed to the work of Harold Pinter.

In 1997, Bogayev won the Anti-Booker Prize for Русская народная почта (The Russian National Postal Service) and the award for Best Play at Russia's Golden Mask Festival for that same play.

== Plays ==
The author of over 30 plays, he is best known for his play Русская народная почта (Russkaya Narodnaya Pochta, variously translated as The Russian National Postal Service, The Russian People's Post, etc.), for which he has won the 1997 Anti-Booker Prize for a stage play and the award for Best Play at Russia's Golden Mask Festival. The play first came to public attention at a dramatic reading during the 1997 Lyubimovka Festival of Young Playwrights; it was later produced in a revised form as Room of Laughter, directed by Kama Ginkas and starring Oleg Tabakov in 1998. It has subsequently been performed translated into English and French and has been produced in London, Montreal, and Washington, D.C. as well as around the Slavic world.

The Russian National Postal Service follows impoverished Russian pensioner Ivan Zhukov on his descent into madness. He engages in fanciful correspondence, writing letters to important world figures (living, dead, and fictional) and then writes replies to himself on their behalf. Prominent among his imagined correspondents are Elizabeth II and Soviet Russia's Vladimir Lenin, as well as cosmonauts, Russian officials, and Robinson Crusoe. The play has often been compared to the works of Nikolai Gogol for its absurdism and treatment of alienation.

Few of Bogayev's works other than The Russian National Postal Service have been produced in the English-speaking world. His play Maria's Field (Марьино поле) received its United States premiere in 2009 by the TUTA Theatre of Chicago. The play explores the fate of three 100-year-old women on a journey through a Russian forest, encountering figures from their own past and from 20th century Russian history. Bogaev relates that the story was inspired by his grandmother, Anafisa, and others like her whose husbands were declared "missing" during war and who still hoped for their return. He writes "The fate of men was easier than the fate of women. It is harder to wait than to die." Despite the tragic theme of the play, it is leavened by a "whimsical and wistful" tone and a "comical cow" accompanying the women on their journey.

=== Notable Productions of The Russian National Postal Service ===
Notable Productions of The Russian National Postal Service
Date	Theatre	Director	Language (Translator)	Title as Produced	Note
June 1997	Lyubimovka Festival of Young Playwrights, Moscow	unknown	Russian (not in translation)	Русская народная почта (The Russian National Postal Service)	staged reading
Fall 1998	Tabakov Theater, Moscow	Kama Ginkas	Russian (not in translation)	Komnata Smekha (Room of Laughter)	World Premiere
May 2001	International Playwrights Festival, Royal Court Theatre, London	unknown	English (Tom Birchenough)	Russian National Post	Rehearsed reading
Fall 2001	Théâtre Espace Go, Montreal	Luce Pelletier	French (Fabrice Gex)	La Poste Populaire Russe (The Russian People's Post)	
Fall 2004	Studio Theatre, Washington DC	Paul Mullins	English (John Freedman)	The Russian National Postal Service	United States Premiere
Summer 2005	Sputnik Theatre Company, London	Noah Birksted-Breen	English (Noah Birksted-Breen)	The Russian National Mail	British premiere

== List of Selected Plays ==
- The Russian National Postal Service (aka Room of Laughter, The Russian People's Post), 1997
- Phallus Imitator (aka Falloimitator, Phallic Imitator)
  - The Rubber Prince is a musical based on Phallus Imitator, 2003
- Maria's Field
- Thirty-three Fortunes
- Dead Ears, or A History of Toilette Paper (the title has also been translated as Deaf Souls)
- The Great Wall of China
