= New Drama =

Russian theater movement

New Drama (also described as New Russian Drama) is a Russian theater movement that emphasizes "natural speech" and addresses social issues while avoiding being overtly political. The movement emerged in the 1990s, during the period of perestroika. During that time, there were many theaters in Russia, but few new playwrights; the existing theaters produced mostly foreign plays and Russian classics. Some early leaders in the New Drama movement were playwright and director Nikolay Kolyada, who was creating new works throughout the 1990s, and Aleksei Kazantsev, who opened the Playwright and Director Center in Moscow in 1998 to encourage the development of new plays and support new playwrights.

== Style ==
The hyper-naturalist style of New Drama has been compared to the British In-yer-face theatre of the 1990s or the Angry Young Men British theater movement of the 1950s. New Drama plays often feature violence and obscenities, the latter of which violates a former taboo in Russian theater. Critic John Freedman notes that both violence and obscenity can be unsettling to viewers seeking an uplifting theatrical experience, but that playwrights and directors of the New Drama movement favor the portrayal of the "essence of life as we live it" rather than a romanticized ideal. In the New Drama style, the poetry of theatrical writing gives way to "reality, simplicity, directness, and unblinking honesty."

== In Europe and North America ==
Russian New Drama has garnered the attention of Western audiences through productions in Europe and North America, such as the New Russian Drama series at Towson University from 2007-2010, New Russian Drama Festival in Austin, Texas in 2011 and 2012 and the New Russian Drama Week in London in 2018. The movement is also represented by English-language anthologies such as Real and phantom pains : an anthology of new Russian drama and New Russian drama : an anthology, and studied in Performing Violence: Literary and Theatrical Experiments of New Russian Drama.

== Notable examples ==
=== Plays ===
- Tania-Tania by Olia Mukhina
- Vodka, Fucking, and Television by Maxim Kurochkin
- Oxygen, by Ivan Vyrypaev
- Oginski's Polonaise by Nikolay Kolyada
- The Russian National Postal Service, Oleg Bogayev

=== Theaters ===
- The Playwright and Director Center, Moscow
- Teatr.doc, Moscow
- Meyerhold Center, Moscow
- Kolyada Theater, Yekaterinburg
