= Sergey Gandlevsky =

Russian poet and novelist

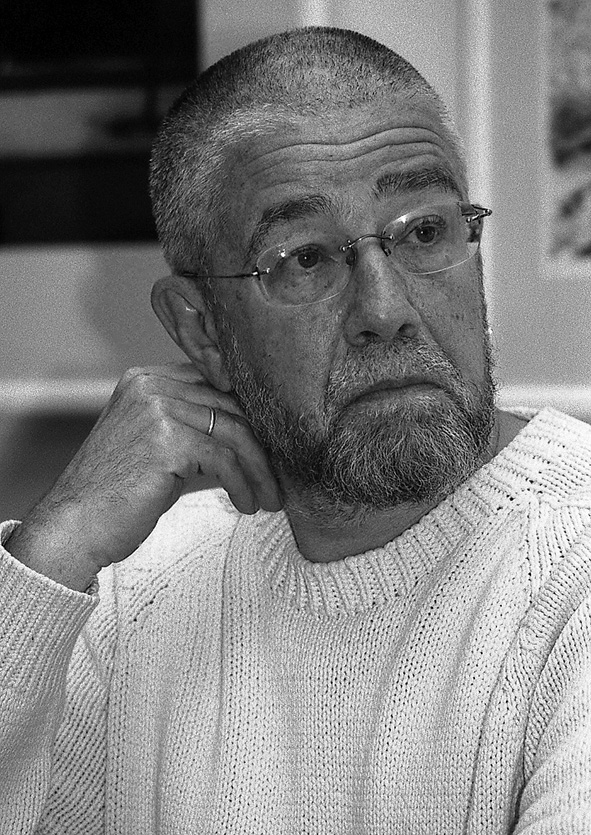
- Born: Sergey Konstantinovich Gandlevsky; March 21, 1952 (age 74); Moscow, Soviet Union
- Education: Moscow State University
- Occupations: Poet, novelist, essayist
- Writing career
- Language: Russian
- Notable works: The Trepanation of the Skull, A Kindred Orphanhood
- Notable awards: Little Booker Prize (1996), Anti-Booker Prize (1996), Moscow Score Prize (2009), Poet Prize (2010)

Sergey Konstantinovich Gandlevsky (born March 21, 1952) is a Russian poet, novelist, and essayist. He is recognized as a prominent contemporary Russian poet, known for his style combining classical poetic forms with modern themes. His works explore topics of memory, identity, and the human condition.

== Biography ==
Gandlevsky was born in Moscow and grew up in the Soviet Union. During the 1970s and 1980s, he avoided formal participation in the Soviet literary system, working various jobs and sharing his poetry within a small underground circle. His works remained unpublished in official Soviet literary journals until the late 1980s, during the period of glasnost.

After the collapse of the Soviet Union, Gandlevsky gained more recognition. He won the important Little Booker Prize in 1996 for his autobiographical novel The Trepanation of the Skull. His literary career also includes numerous collections of poetry, essays, and prose, many of which have been translated into several languages, including English, French, and German.

Since 1993, Gandlevsky has been associated with the journal Foreign Literature. He relocated to Georgia in 2022 due to the war in Ukraine.

== Literary themes and style ==
Gandlevsky's poetry often juxtaposes classical forms with the gritty realities of modern life, addressing themes such as love, freedom, death, and artistic expression. His tone combines humour and world-weariness, frequently exploring existential dilemmas through a confessional lens. Critics have likened his work to American confessional poetry for its interplay of personal experience and broader cultural commentary.

== Notable works ==
- The Trepanation of the Skull (1996)
- Illegible (2019)
- A Kindred Orphanhood (2003, translated collection of poetry)

== Awards and recognition ==
Some of the awards received by Gandlevsky include:

- Little Booker Prize (1996)
- Anti-Booker Prize (1996)
- Northern Palmyra (2000)
- Moscow Score Prize (2009)
- Poet Prize (Russia) (2010)
