= Anarchism in Mongolia =

Anarchism in Mongolia was present during the revolutionary period of the 1910s and 1920s, closely linked with the Russian anarchist movement in Altai, Buryatia and Tuva.

== History ==
From the 19th century onwards, Mongolia acted as a refuge for Russian and Chinese revolutionaries, fleeing persecution by their respective empires. Many anarchists were drawn there by the freedom that the wide open spaces of the sparsely populated plateau afforded to them.

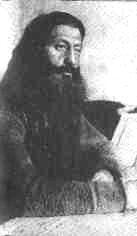
Nestor Kalandarishvil, an anarchist partisan leader during the Russian Civil War, who led a tactical retreat of Soviet forces into Mongolia.

With the fall of the monarchy in China, the Mongolian Revolution of 1911 overthrew Qing rule, establishing the independent Bogd Khanate of Mongolia, under the rule of Bogd Khan. Tuva followed suit, declaring the independence of the Uryankhay Republic, later becoming a Russian protectorate. In 1917, the Russian Revolution overthrew the Russian Empire, establishing the Russian Republic in February. This was itself overthrown in October and the Russian Soviet Federative Socialist Republic was established in its place, igniting the Russian Civil War. In its wake, Altai and Buryatia declared independence from Russia, while Tuva was divided between Russian and Chinese occupation forces.

At the turn of 1918, anarchist detachments began to form in Siberia, including a cavalry division led by Nestor Kalandarishvil and a Red Guard detachment led by Dmitri Tretyakov. In March 1918, Tretyakov's detachment attempted to establish a soviet in Kyakhta, but conflict with the local population forced them to flee to Irkutsk, where they were captured, disarmed and arrested by Centrosibir. With the collapse of the Eastern Front and the downfall of Soviet power in Siberia, Centrosibir had ceased to function by August 1918. This led to many leftists, including anarchists, fleeing to Mongolia to escape the White Terror, Nestor Kalandarishvili spearheaded the border crossing, leading between 800 and 1,500 people to the Mongolian village of Khatgal. They remained for a few weeks, recruiting a number of Mongols during their stay, before crossing the border back into Buryatia at Sanaga to fight a guerilla war against the Russian State. Anarchists, Left SRs and Maximalists also made up part of the guerilla forces of Alexander Kravchenko and Pyotr Shchetinkin, which led the re-assertion of Soviet power over Tuva in 1919.

Pavel Baltakhinov, a Buryat anarchist who had been agitating against the Russian State as part of an anarcho-communist group in Irkutsk, fled from the White Terror in early 1919 and went into hiding in Mongolia. During his stay, Baltakhinov participated in anarchist agitprop among the local Mongols, such that when he returned to Siberia in August 1919, he brought many Mongols along with him, where they joined the anarchist guerillas led by Kalandarishvili. He eventually came to command a Buryat guerilla detachment, made up of 50-60 people.

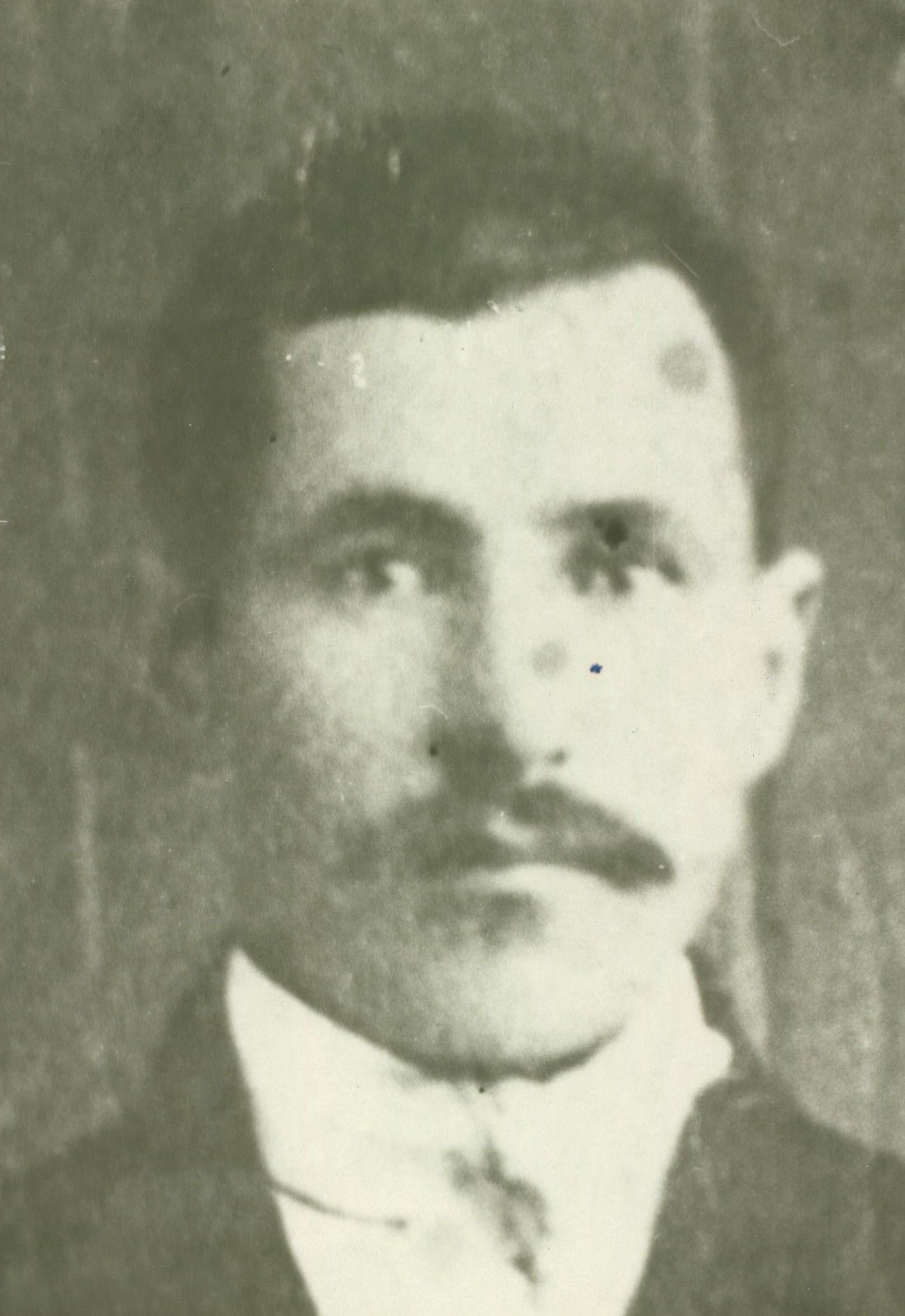
Ivan Novosyolov, an Altaian anarchist that fled from Bolshevik repression in Altai to China, through Mongolia.

In October 1919, the Anhui warlord Xu Shuzheng led the military occupation of Mongolia and Tuva, backed by the Empire of Japan. In February 1921, the Chinese occupation forces were ousted by the White general Roman von Ungern-Sternberg, who restored Bogd Khan to the throne and led pogroms against Mongolian leftists and Jews. Buryat anarchists took up the struggle against the occupation, forcing the White Army out of Mongolia. In its place, the Tuvan People's Republic was established by the Tuvan People's Revolutionary Party and the Mongolian People's Republic was later established by the Mongolian People's Party, as part of a coalition between the old nobility and the new Bolshevik order, leading to early anti-government protests by many Arats. Repression followed the Soviet Union's annexation of Altai and Buryatia, leading many, including the Altaian anarchist Ivan Novosyolov, to flee first to Mongolia and then to China.

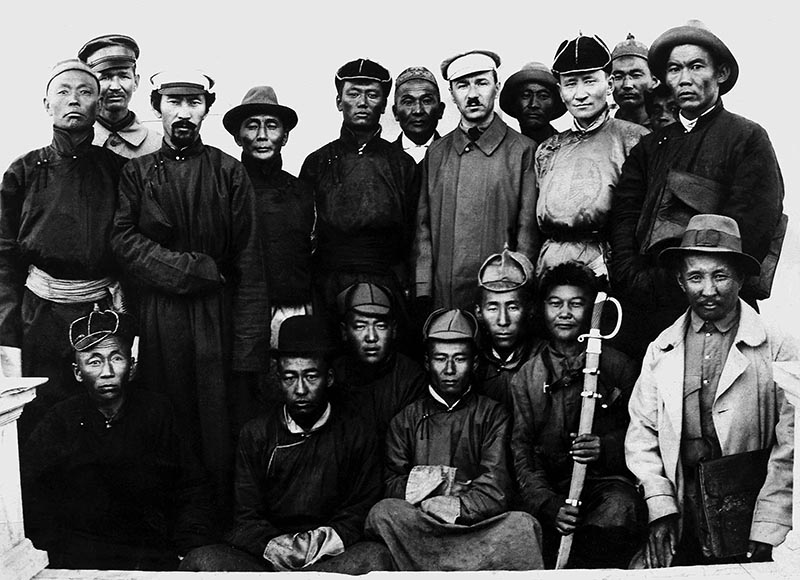
Founding members of the Mongolian People's Party during the Mongolian Revolution of 1921.

Nevertheless, forms of radical leftism continued to exist in Mongolia throughout the early 1920s, particularly among the "Revolutionary Union of Youth of Mongolia". It was established in August 1921 and organized for social equality, increased literacy, women's liberation, anti-clericalism and the abolition of serfdom. They criticized the sluggish implementation of social reforms and refused to submit to the ruling party, noting that "much things remain as before: the princes oppress, keeping the old order, ignoring the people's situation, guided by hereditary rights and resisting the People's Government." The People's Party denounced the union as anarchist rebels and the prime minister Dogsomyn Bodoo called for the implementation of extreme measures to suppress it. In response, the union armed themselves and called for the removal of government officials that opposed them, but the Buryat revolutionary Rinchingiin Elbegdorj prevented any armed confrontation from taking place. The Communist International, concerned by the heterogeneous nature of the Mongolian revolutionary movement, ordered its Bolshevization. It later oversaw the formal subjugation of the Youth Union to the People's Party, further eliminating dissent to single-party rule.

The Arats, who were being marginalized by the nobility and party officials, continued to push for social reforms - even managing to achieve some in Tuva. However, the nobility continued to hold onto power and the feudal marginalization of Arats continued. In response, many Arats formed Chuduruk Nam, an armed anarchist militant group with the goal of protecting the Arats from the oppressive practices of the nobility and party officials. The organization confiscated cattle and property from the wealthy, attacked corrupt party officials, encouraged free love and promoted sanitation and hygiene.

In March 1924, a counter-revolutionary insurrection was incited by the local nobility and clergy, aiming for a return to traditionalist values. Supported by the Mongolian government, it demanded Tuva be annexed into the Mongolian state, but the insurrection was quickly put down by the intervention of the Soviet Union, a Tuvan government detachment and squads of volunteer Arats. Despite the role that Arats played in putting down the insurrection, the government blamed radical Arat activists for the situation, alleging that Chuduruk Nam had provoked it. As a result, Arat party officials were removed from their posts, including the Tuvan party chairman Oyun Kyursedi. In December 1924, the Chuduruk Nam detachment was surrounded by government forces in the Ulug-Khem Valley and forcibly disarmed.

With the elimination of the remaining left-wing opposition, the ruling parties of Mongolia and Tuva consolidated their power, overseen by the Communist Party of the Soviet Union. In Tuva, power fell to Donduk Kuular, a former Lama with theocratic and nationalist ambitions. In 1929, the Soviet Union orchestrated a coup d'état, which removed and executed Donduk. He was replaced with Salchak Toka, a hardline Stalinist that ruled Tuva until his death in 1972, overseeing the Soviet annexation of the country during World War II. In Mongolia, power had fallen to Peljidiin Genden, an outspoken critic of Soviet Imperialism and Joseph Stalin's anti-religious campaigns. After a public argument with Stalin, Peljidiin was removed from power by Khorloogiin Choibalsan, another hardline Stalinist. Peljidiin was subsequently executed and declared a nonperson during the Great Purge, which initiated a campaign of repression in Mongolia. The left-wing opposition remained suppressed until the Mongolian Revolution of 1990, which ended single-party rule in Mongolia.

== See also ==
- List of anarchist movements by region
- Anarchism in China
- Anarchism in Russia
