= Yakut revolt =

Yakut revolt may refer to:

- 1918 Yakut revolt, the rejection of Bolshevik rule by the Yakut people of far eastern Russia
- 1921 Yakut revolt, the last episode and final set of military engagements of the Russian Civil War
