= Galina Gebruk =

Russian-born Holocaust survivor (1933–2022)

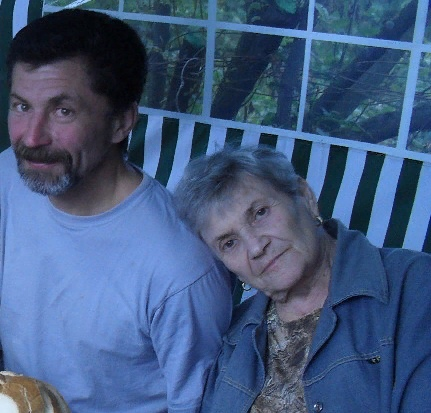
Galina with son Andrei

Galina Mikhailovna Gebruk (Russian: Галина Михайловна Гебрук; 21 May 1933 – 24 May 2022) was a prisoner of the Kaluga Ghetto, a survivor and witness of the Holocaust, an activist of the Jewish movement in Russia and Veteran of Labour.

Born in 1933 to Russian father Mikhail Kryuchkov and Jewish mother Disya Zalmanovna.

Memories remain very vague. I remember hunger, cold and the screams of the Germans. And yet a fire: the Germans set fire to the fence of the ghetto during the retreat. Mom threw me over the fence into the snow, and then by some miracle she climbed over the burning boards herself. I was very afraid that I would lose my mother, I screamed loudly and cried. Mom and I returned home.

Her husband was artist Ivan Gebruk (born 1932), an Estonian Jew. They met in Siberia. Their children are Andrei and Ekaterina.

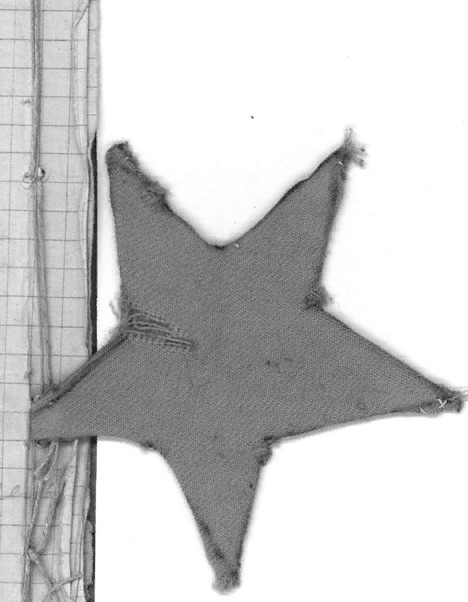
Star of the Kaluga Ghetto's prisoners

== Literature ==
- Maya Dobychina. The Jewish Ghetto in Kaluga, November–December 1941 ISBN 9785905456152 (2012)
- Maria Gilyova / Tatyana Pasman. We Cannot be Silent. Schoolchildren and Students about the Holocaust (2017)
- Vadim Dubson. Ghetto in the Occupied Territory of the Russian Federation (1941–1942) // Bulletin of the Jewish University. — 2000. — No. 3 (21). — p. 157-184.
- Ilya Altman. The Holocaust on the territory of the USSR: Encyclopedia (2009) — p. 378-379. ISBN 978-5-8243-1296-6
- Sergei Mikheyenkov. Stop Guderian. 50th Army in the Battles for Tula and Kaluga. 1941-1942 (2013)
- Boris Saltsman. Catastrophe: To Know and Remember. ISBN 978-5-457-35049-6
- Leonid Yuzefovich, Zakhar Prilepin, Galina Yuzefovich, Marina Stepnova and others. How We Survived the War. Folk Stories ISBN 978-5-04-011776-5
- Gai Miron. The Yad Vashem Encyclopedia of the Ghettos during the Holocoust (2009) — p. 1067 ISBN 978-965-308-345-5
