= Ascension Church, Rostov-on-Don =

Russian Orthodox church

Ascension Church
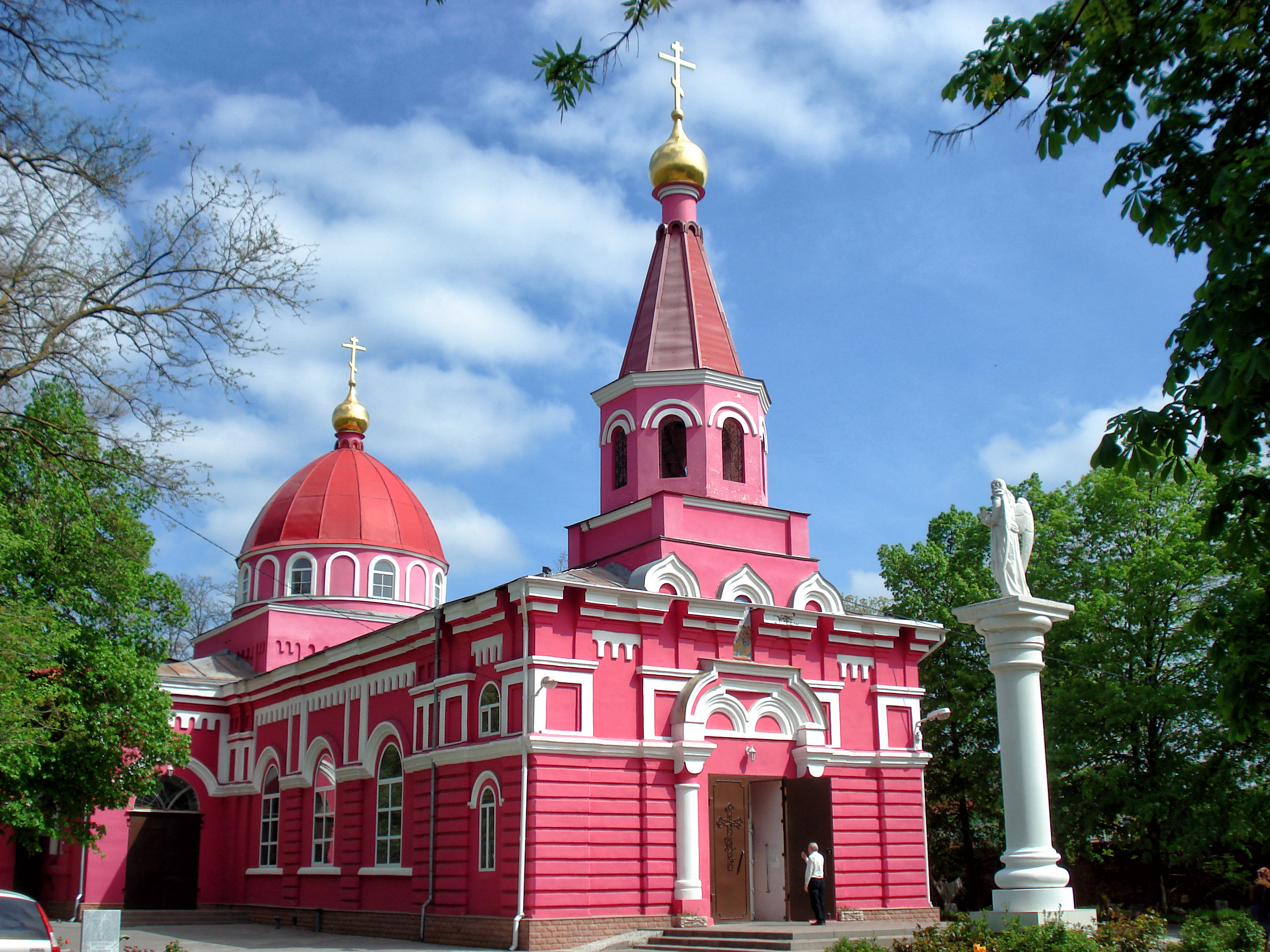

- Location within Russia

Religion
- Affiliation: Russian Orthodox

Location
- Location: Rostov-on-Don, Rostov Oblast, Russia
- Interactive map of Ascension Church
- Coordinates: 47.2391°N 39.7169°E

Architecture
- Architect: Grigory Vasiliev
- Style: Byzantine Revival, Russian Revival
- Completed: 1913

Church of the Ascension of the Lord (Russian: Храм Вознесения Господня) ― an Orthodox church, built in 1910-1913 on the territory of the Brethren Cemetery in Rostov-on-Don, Russia. Construction of the temple was carried out at the expense of merchants Gerasimov, Myasnikov and Safonov. The project was drafted by architect Grigory Vasilyev. The main altar was consecrated in honour of the Ascension of the Lord. Side chapels ― in honour of saints Adrian and Natalia, and in honour of St. John the Evangelist. The church has the status of an object of cultural heritage of regional significance.

== History ==
In 1892, after a cholera epidemic outbreak outside the city, there had been established a cemetery, which was named Brethren Cemetery (Братское). Back then it was the largest cemetery in Rostov-on-Don, yet for some time it hadn't even had a chapel.

From 1891 to 1908 at the New Market Square there had been being built the Alexander Nevsky's Cathedral. During this period, there had been constructed a temporal stone church, based on Sergei Zagoskin's project. After the consecration of the cathedral, it was decided not to demolish the church completely, but to disassemble and transport building material to the Brethren Cemetery for the construction of a new church there.

Transportation was implemented at the expense of merchants Gerasimov, Myasnikov and Safonov. Construction works were carried out under the direction of the city architect G.N. Vasilyev.

The temple architecture had neo-Byzantine and Russian Revival features. Initially, the temple had a great chapter and four small cupolas. Dacades were decorated with brick veneer. Above the western entrance rose a belfry.

In 1929 the church was closed. "Dinamo" sport stadium used its premises as a warehouse. In 1933, after an appeal to the authorities of the Assumption community in the church was opened again, only to be re-closed again in 1937. In 1930-1940-ies bell tower and dome of the temple were destroyed. In 1942, during the times of German occupation, the church was re-opened. The official opening of the church took place in 1946, and since then the services have not stopped.

In the late 1990s, restoration works were conducted, during which the bell tower and the dome were restored. In the second half of the 2000s there was carried out reconstruction of church interior.
