= Kalandarishvili =

Kalandarishvili is a Georgian language patronymic surname literally meaning "son of kalantar". Notable people with the surname include:

- Nestor Kalandarishvili (1876–1922), Georgian revolutionary and militant during Russian Civil War
- Yulia Kalandarishvili (born 1992), Russian stage director and educator
