= 1918 Yakut revolt =

Anti-Bolshevik revolt in the Russian Civil War

- Part of the Russian Civil War
- Map of Yakutsk Oblast in the Russian Empire.
Date	28 February – 1 July 1918
Location	Yakutia
Result	Soviet victory
Territorial changes	Yakutia defeated by Soviets

Belligerents
Russian Soviet Republic: Centrosibir	Yakutsk Oblast: Regional Council

Commanders and leaders
A. S. Rydzinski	V. V. Popov; P. A. Bondaletov

Casualties and losses
- 90 killed

In February 1918, the leadership of the Yakutsk Oblast established a Regional Council, refusing to submit to the Bolsheviks and remaining loyal to the overthrown Provisional Government. On July 1, a Red Army detachment established Soviet power in Yakutsk.

== Course of events ==
The Yakutsk Oblast was one of the few parts of Russia where the Bolsheviks failed to establish authority following the events of October 1917 due to the political weakness of the radical left in region. The regional leadership remained loyal to the Russian Provisional Government. After the dissolution of the Constituent Assembly and following an attempt by the Russian SFSR leadership to replace the Yakutsk Oblast commissar, V. N. Solovyov, with a Bolshevik loyalist, various civic organizations in Yakutia established a "Regional Council" on February 9, 1918, which assumed full authority over the region. Their chairman was V. V. Popov.

This Regional Council refused to submit to the Bolsheviks and maintained its allegiance to the Constituent Assembly. Due to the prevailing national chaos in Russia and strikes by the postal workers' union, the Regional Council lost contact with the central government; while it functioned autonomously, it did not formally declare independence.

On February 28, the Bolsheviks seized power in Irkutsk and established "Centrosibir", an authority that extended its reach across the southern part of Eastern Siberia. In March, supporters of Soviet power in Yakutia elected a "Council of Workers' Deputies," creating a situation of dual power in Yakutsk Oblast. The Regional Council responded by arresting the deputies of CWD. Centrosibir issued an ultimatum to the authorities in Yakutia demanding the release of the detained deputies, but received no response. On May 19, a Red Army detachment under the command of Apollinary Rydzinsky set out from Irkutsk toward Yakutsk.

Regional council was overthrown on July 1 by the intervention of Soviet troops from Irkutsk led by A. S. Rydzinski. The battle for the city lasted about three hours, from 10 p.m. on June 30 to 2 a.m. on July 1. Finally, the city was taken by the Red Army, with total losses amounting to 90 people.

Later, in 1921, the Yakuts and White Russians would organize an anti-Soviet revolt in the region, which also ended in failure.
