= Nestor Kalandarishvili =

Georgian revolutionary and military commander (1876–1922)

Grandpa Nestor Kalandarishvili
- ნესტორ კალანდარიშვილი
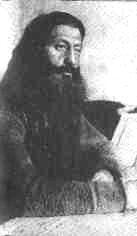
- Born: Nestor Aleksandres dze Kalandarishvili; 8 July 1876; Shemokmedi, Kutaisi Governorate, Russian Empire (modern-day Georgia)
- Died: 6 March 1922 (aged 45); Yakutsk Oblast, Siberia
- Cause of death: Killed in action
- Resting place: Jerusalem Cemetery, Irkutsk; 52.277047°N 104.296550°E
- Occupation: Actor
- Political party: Socialist Revolutionary Party (1900–1904); Georgian Socialist-Federalist Revolutionary Party (1904–1907); Russian Communist Party (1921–1922)
- Movement: Revolutionary socialism, anarchism in Georgia
- Military career
- Allegiance: Siberian Soviet Republic (1918); Russian Socialist Federative Soviet Republic (1919–1920); Far Eastern Republic (1920–1922)
- Service: Red Army
- Conflicts: Eastern Front of the Russian Civil War
- Awards: Order of the Red Banner

Nestor Aleksandres dze Kalandarishvili (Georgian: ნესტორ ალექსანდრეს ძე კალანდარიშვილი; 8 July 1876 – 6 March 1922) was a Georgian revolutionary socialist and military commander. Born into the lesser Georgian nobility, Kalandarishvili studied at a seminary, where he joined the Socialist Revolutionary Party. During the 1905 Revolution, he led an uprising of the Georgian Socialist-Federalist Revolutionary Party and later became an anarchist. He then participated in the Gurian Republic and was exiled to Siberia after it was crushed. Following the outbreak of the Russian Civil War, he fought an anarchist guerrilla war against the White movement in Siberia. By 1919, he had joined the Red Army, within which he led the defeat of the Russian State. He then renounced anarchism, joined the Russian Communist Party and put down anarchist independent guerrillas in Siberia. He was killed in action while fighting a counterinsurgency against a White uprising.

== Biography ==
=== Early life and activism ===
Kalandarishvili was born on 8 July [O.S. 26 June] 1876 in the Georgian village of Shemokmedi, in the Kutaisi Governorate of the Russian Empire. He was from a family of lesser Georgian nobility, and he had four siblings. He began school in his village in 1884, before going on to study at a gymnasium in Kutaisi and later a seminary in Tbilisi. From 1895 to 1897, he was conscripted into military service for the Imperial Russian Army.

After completing his military service, he returned to his studies at the seminary, where he came into contact with members of the Socialist Revolutionary Party (PSR) in 1900. He was expelled in 1903 for distributing revolutionary propaganda, and subsequently joined up with the SR Combat Organization. He moved to Batumi, where, in 1904, he left the PSR and joined the Georgian Socialist-Federalist Revolutionary Party. During the Revolution of 1905, he participated in a socialist-federalist uprising in Batumi. When the uprising was crushed, he fled into hiding in Kutaisi, where he began working as an actor, became an anarchist and established a Georgian Anarchist Federation. He took part in several guerrilla attacks and robberies against the Russian authorities and nobility, and was arrested numerous times. When the revolutionary Gurian Republic was defeated, Kalandarishvili was exiled to the Russian Far East. There he continued working as an actor and organised with other exiled Georgian anarchists in Cheremkhovo. He was arrested again on suspicion of plotting to assassinate the governor of Irkutsk, but he was released due to a lack of evidence.

=== Civil War ===
Following the 1917 Revolution, Kalandarishvili organised a squadron of Caucasian anarchists to fight back against the Junker mutiny. In February 1918, the Central Executive Committee of Siberian Soviets appointed him as commander-in-chief of their forces; he took personal command of the 1st Irkutsk Cavalry Division of Communist-Anarchists, which was made up anarchists, international volunteers and miners from Cheremkhovo. He led his division into battle on the Eastern Front of the Russian Civil War, where they fought against the counter-revolutionary Baikal Cossacks commanded by Grigory Semyonov. Over time, Kalandarishvili's division was reinforced by volunteers and grew in size. Russian poet and biocosmist Alexander Yaroslavsky was one of those who volunteered to fight under Kalandarishvili's command. During his guerrilla campaign against the White movement, Kalandarishvili was given the title of "Grandpa" (Russian: Дедушка, romanized: Dedushka), owing to his long beard.

In July 1918, the Siberian Soviet Republic reorganised Kalandarishvili's division into the 3rd Soviet Verkhneudinsk Division, which he retained command of and which was integrated into the 2nd Siberian Rifle Corps of the Red Army. The following month, the Baikal Front collapsed and the 3rd Division fell back to Kyakhta. In September 1918, Kalandarishvili's forces were defeated in battle by the Baikal Cossacks. Together with a Red Guard detachment led by Dmitri Tretyakov, he led a retreat along the Dzhida river into Mongolia. Between 800 and 1,500 soldiers went with him. He took the detachment to Khatgal and encamped for 2 weeks on the east bank of Lake Khövsgöl. He then crossed back over the border at Sanaga, in Buryatia, and crossed over the Sayan Mountains to continue their guerrilla war against the Whites.

In March 1919, the Siberian leadership of the Russian Communist Party (RCP) proposed an alliance with Kalandarishvili. He initially rejected the offer, but agreed after the party pledged to supply him with arms, funds and soldiers. Later that year, Kalandarishvili led guerrilla attacks against the Russian State in the area around Irkutsk, leading to Alexander Kolchak putting a bounty on him. During this period, Kalandarishvili's guerrilla forces were joined by the Buryat anarchist Pavel Baltakhinov, who came to head its Buryat detachment. By January 1920, Kalandarishvili's guerrilla campaign had culminated with the Soviet capture of Irkutsk.

=== Counter-insurgent operations and death ===
In 1921, Kalandarishvili went to Moscow and met with Vladimir Lenin, who convinced him to renounce anarchist communism and join the Bolshevik Communist Party. Kalandarishvili was awarded the Order of the Red Banner and Lenin appointed him as commander-in-chief of the Soviet forces in the Far Eastern Republic, which gave him the power to appoint and dismiss officers. Using this power, Kalandarishvili took a turn towards authoritarianism and sought to suppress the independent action of anarchist guerrilla groups in Siberia, as well as the continuing White insurgency.

In March 1921, the Irkutsk branch of the Korean Communist Party (KCP) gave Kalandarishvili command of its newly-established Korean Revolutionary Military Council. With support from Boris Shumyatsky, the Irkutsk KCP attempted to monopolise control of the Korean guerrilla movement in the Far Eastern Republic, despite their influence being challenged by Georgy Chicherin. On 28 June 1921, Kalandarishvili attempted to compel the submission Ilya Pak's Sakhalin Detachment (made up of Korean anarchists) in the Amur Oblast. But Pak refused to recognise Kalandarishvili's authority, as he answered to a different Korean military council. Between 118 and 400 people were killed in the subsequent clash between the two partisan forces, which ended with the disarmament and dissolution of the Sakhalin Regiment. Vasily Blyukher blamed the violence on the Korean guerrillas for not submitting to Kalandarishvili.

In January 1922, Kalandarishvili led 300 soldiers to Yakutia to put down a White uprising. There, on 6 March, Kalandarishvili was killed in an ambush; the exact circumstances are unclear, with the official story being that he was killed by White rebels, while some historians believe he was assassinated by the Bolsheviks. His body was buried in Yakutsk on 2 April, then exhumed and reinterred in Irkutsk on 17 September.

== Legacy ==
After the establishment of the Soviet Union, Kalandarishvili was recognised as a revolutionary icon by the new government and his name was given to streets and collective farms around the country.

From a story Kalandarishvili told him about a Mongol partisan in his detachment who claimed to be a direct descendant of Genghis Khan, the writer Ivan Novokshonov wrote a novel titled The Descendant of Genghis Khan. In 1928, the novel was adapted by Vsevolod Pudovkin into the film Storm over Asia.

Anarchist historians have contrasted Kalandarishvili with Nestor Makhno, a Ukrainian revolutionary with the same given name who led an anarchist guerrilla movement on the Southern Front of the Russian Civil War. Charlie Allison described Kalandarishvili as an "anti-Makhno".

== Bibliography ==
- Allison, Charlie (2023). "Nestor Kalandarishvili". No Harmless Power: The Life and Times of the Ukrainian Anarchist Nestor Makhno. PM Press. p. 197. ISBN 978-1-62963-471-5.
- Damier, Vadim; Limanov, K. (14 January 2018) [14 October 2015]. "Anarchists and left radicals in Mongolia and Tuva (1910s–1920s)". Translated by Foristaruso. Confederation of Revolutionary Anarcho-Syndicalists – via Libcom.org.
- Heath, Nick (22 August 2009). "Kalandarishvili, Nestor Alexandrevitch, 1876–1922". Libcom.org. Anarchists who turned to the Bolsheviks.
- Sablin, Ivan (2019). "The Far Eastern Republic and the Priamur State Formation, 1921". the Rise and Fall of Russia's Far Eastern Republic, 1905–1922: Nationalisms, Imperialisms, and Regionalisms in and after the Russian Empire. Routledge. pp. 182–232. ISBN 978-1-138-31730-7.
- Shapovalov, Veronica, ed. (2001). Remembering the Darkness: Women in Soviet Prisons. Rowman & Littlefield. ISBN 978-0-7425-1146-0.
- "Anarchist division of Nestor Kalandarishvili in Siberia (1917-1919)". Autonomous Action. 20 January 2023.
