= Ivan Strod =

Soviet army officer (1894-1938)

Ivan Yakovlevich Strod (Russian: Иван Яковлевич Строд, Latvian: Jānis Strods; April 10, 1894 – February 4, 1938) was a Soviet Red Army officer during the Russian Civil War in the Russian Far East from 1918 to 1923. He is the subject of an acclaimed 2015 book, The Winter Road.

Ivan Strod was born in Ludza as the son of a Latvian medical attendant and a Polish mother. He participated in World War I in the army of the Russian Empire, and fought in the western and northern fronts. Ivan Strod volunteered the Red Army in 1918 fighting against the Whites in Siberia. From November 1918 to December 1919 he was in the Olyokminsk prison. After the release, Ivan Strod headed the Volunteer Revolutionary Detachment. In October 1920 he was a commander of a cavalry detachment of the People's Revolutionary Army of the Far Eastern Republic.

He was in charge of defeating a White general Anatoly Pepelyayev during the Yakut Revolt. Ivan Strod was awarded with three Orders of the Red Banner. In 1927 he was retired because of poor health conditions. Ivan Strod worked for Osoaviakhim works in Tomsk. He was executed during the Great Purge, as a part of the so-called "Latvian Operation".
