= Stepan Vostretsov =

Soviet military leader

- Степан Сергеевич Вострецов
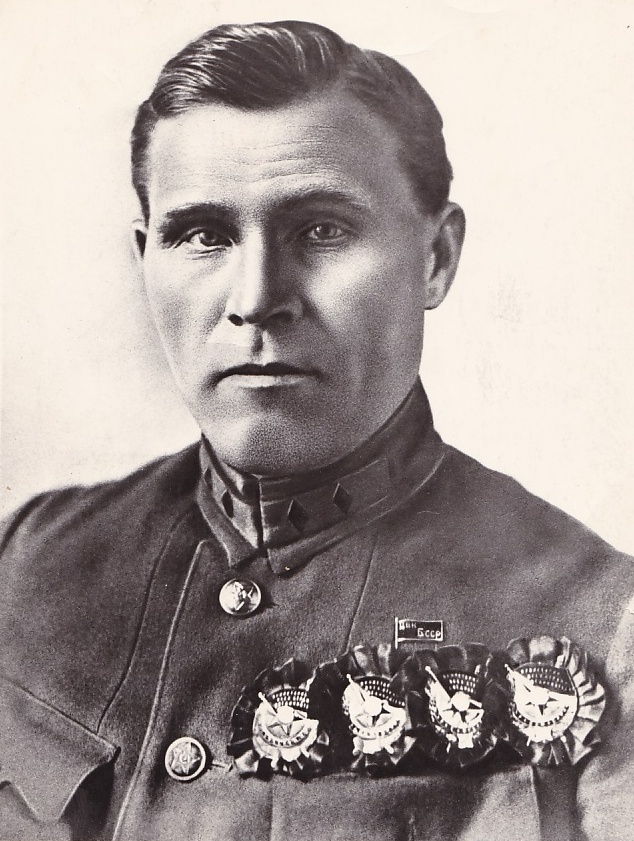
- Born: 29 November 1883; Kazantsevo, Birsky Uyezd, Ufa Governorate, Russian Empire
- Died: 2 May 1932 (aged 48); Novocherkassk, Rostov Oblast, Russian SFSR, Soviet Union
- Burial place: Brethren Cemetery
- Military career
- Branch: (Russian Empire) Imperial Russian Army (Russia) Russian Army (Russian Soviet Federative Socialist Republic) Red Army
- Service years: 1906–1932
- Rank: Komkor
- Conflicts: First World War; Russian Civil War; Polish–Soviet War; Sino-Soviet conflict

Stepan Sergeevich Vostretsov (Russian: Степан Сергеевич Вострецов; 29 December [O.S. 17 December] 1883 – 2 May 1932) was a Soviet military commander.

== Biography ==
Vostretsov was born in the family of a peasant and worked as a blacksmith. In 1905, Vostretsov joined the RSDLP and was engaged in underground revolutionary activities.

From 1906 to 1909, he served in the army as a private. He was sentenced to 3 years in prison for revolutionary agitation among the soldiers in 1909. He took part in the First World War. For his bravery he was promoted to a Praporshchik, and awarded three Crosses of St. George. After demobilization, Vostretsov organized a commune in his village.

Being a member of the Mensheviks and in opposition to Bolshevism, Vostretsov was arrested for a short period and barely avoided execution. He was approached by members of the White Army but refused to work with them and eventually voluntarily joined the Red Army in 1919 and the Russian Communist Party (b) in 1920.

In 1919–1920, he commanded the 242nd Volga Regiment of the 27th Rifle Division on the Eastern and Western Fronts, distinguished himself at the capture of Chelyabinsk, Omsk, and Minsk. In 1921, he became the head of the Department of the Cheka troops for the protection of the borders of Siberia and in 1922 he commanded a group of troops of the People's Revolutionary Army of the Far Eastern Republic during the storming of Spasska and the expulsion of the White Guards from Primorye In 1923, he led the expeditionary force during the liquidation of general Pepyalyaev's detachment in the Okhotsk - Ayan region (Okhotsk-Ayan operation).

On October 8, 1923, he was appointed assistant commander of the 36th Trans-Baikal Rifle Division. From October to November 1923, he served as commander of the 84th Tula Rifle Division, after which, at his personal request, he was sent to the Military Academic Courses, which he successfully completed on July 27, 1924.

From July 11, 1924, to May 1, 1928, he was commander of the 27th Omsk Red Banner Rifle Division. From March 15, 1927, he was also the commissar of this division. From May 1, 1928, to October 1, 1929, he was commander and commissar of the 51st Red Banner rifle division.

From October 1, 1929, to November 1930, he served as commander and commissar of the 18th Rifle Corps.

During the period of preparation for military operations on the Chinese Eastern Railway (CER), the Trans-Baikal Group of Forces was created as part of the Special Far Eastern Army (ODVA), which included the administration of the 18th Rifle Corps. The troops of the Trans-Baikal Group of Forces, while remaining the commander of the 18th rifle corps were commanded by Vostretsov. Vostretsov participated in the Sino-Soviet operation in 1929.

From August to November 1930, he took courses at the Military-Political Academy. From May 1931 to May 2, 1932, he was the commander of the 9th rifle corps in the city of Novocherkassk.

After the parade on May 1, 1932, he hit a woman in a car in Rostov. Vostretsov shot himself in Novocherkassk between 4 and 5 am on May 2, 1932, at the threshold of his house. He was buried at the Brethren Cemetery of Rostov-on-Don.

== Awards ==
=== Soviet Union ===
- 4 Orders of the Red Banner
- Honorary Revolutionary Weapon

=== Russian Empire ===
- 3 Crosses of St. George
