= Vostretsovo =

Vostretsovo Вострецово
- Selo
- Location within Bashkortostan Location within Russia
- Coordinates: 55°35′N 55°12′E
- Country: Russia
- Region: Bashkortostan
- District: Burayevsky District
- Time zone: UTC+5:00

Vostretsovo (Russian: Вострецово) is a rural locality (a selo) and the administrative centre of Vostretsovsky Selsoviet, Burayevsky District, Bashkortostan, Russia. The population was 330 as of 2010. There are 8 streets. It is named after the Soviet military commander Stepan Vostretsov.

== Geography ==
Vostretsovo is located on the right bank of the Belaya River, 32 km southwest of Burayevo (the district's administrative centre) by road. Kreshchenka is the nearest rural locality.
