= National Bestseller Prize =

Russian literary award

The National Bestseller Literary Prize (Russian: Национальный бестселлер; Natsionalnyi Bestseller, informally shortened Natsbest) was awarded to the best Russian-language novel from 2001 until 2022. It was considered one of three major Russian literary awards, alongside the Russian Booker Prize (discontinued in 2017) and the Big Book Award.

A jury selects 5-6 novels each year, and a smaller jury of experts selects the winner. The winner receives an award of 250,000 rubles. The award was suspended in 2022.

== Winners ==
National Bestseller Literary Prize winners
Year	Author	Title
2001	Leonid Yuzefovich	Kniaz' vetra
2002	Alexander Prokhanov	Gospodin Geksogen
2003	Aleksandr Garros and Aleksei Evdokimov	[Golovo]lomka
2004	Victor Pelevin	Numbers aka DPP (NN)
2005	Mikhail Shishkin	Maidenhair (Venerin Volos)
2006	Dmitry Bykov	Boris Pasternak
2007	Il'ia Vladimirovich Boiashov	Put' Muri
2008	Zakhar Prilepin	Sin
2009	Andrei Gelasimov	Stepnye Bogi
2010	Eduard Kochergiin	Kreshchennye Krestami
2011	Dmitry Bykov	Ostromov, ili Uchenik Charodeia
2012	Aleksandr Terekhov	Nemtsy
2013	Figl'-Migl'	Volki i Medvedi
2014	Ksenia Buksha	Zavod Svoboda
2015	Sergei Anatolievich Nósov	Figurnye Skobki
2016	Leonid Yuzefovich	The Winter Road
2017	Anna Iur'evna Kozlova	F20
2018	Aleksei Borisovich Sal'nikov	Petrovy v grippe i vokrug nego
2019	Andrei Rubanov	Finist-Iasnyi Sokol
2020	Mikhail Elizarov	Земля (Earth)
2021	Aleksandr Pelevin	Pokrov-17
