= Honorary Revolutionary Weapon =

- Type: Ceremonial weapon
- Awarded for: "Special distinction in combat"
- Presented by: the Russian SFSR and the Soviet Union
- Eligibility: Senior commanders
- Status: No longer awarded
- First award: 8 August 1919
- Final award: 23 April 1930

Highlights
- Total: 23
- Total recipients: 21

The Honorary Revolutionary Weapon (Russian: почётное революционное оружие) was the highest award in the Soviet Armed Forces between 1919 and 1930. It was awarded to senior commanders for exceptional combat achievement; the majority of recipients received it for actions during the Russian Civil War.

== History ==
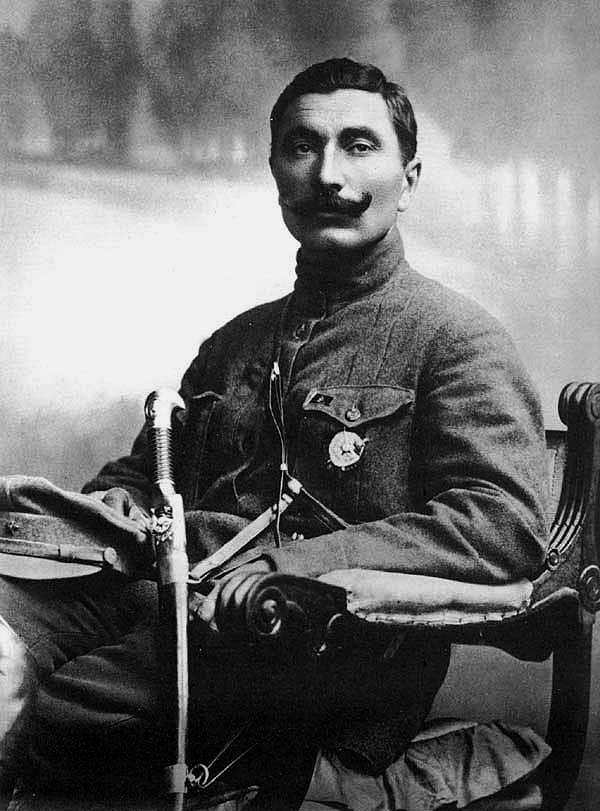
Budyonny with his sword in the early 1920s

After the October Revolution, the Order of the Red Banner, established in 1918, was the only Soviet decoration available to reward military personnel for their actions in the Russian Civil War. Instead of awarding the Order of the Red Banner, the All-Russian Central Executive Committee (VTsIK) gave Sergey Kamenev and Vasily Shorin what it described as "weapons with the badge of the Order of the Red Banner" on 8 August 1919 in recognition of their victories on the Eastern Front against the White forces of Alexander Kolchak. The award consisted of a sword (shashka) that had a badge of the Order of the Red Banner of the RSFSR superimposed on a gilt hilt. It was reminiscent of the Saint George Sword given to senior commanders of the Russian Empire during World War I, and thus represented an unacknowledged return to the Tsarist award system. Semyon Budyonny and Mikhail Tukhachevsky received the award later that year.

The practice of giving successful commanders ceremonial shashkas was legitimized by a decree of the VTsIk on 8 April 1920 following a request from the Revolutionary Military Council. The decree empowered the All-Russian Central Executive Committee (VTsIK) and the Revolutionary Military Council to award an honorary revolutionary weapon in the form of a shashka to senior field commanders for "special distinction in combat," and established a process for award recommendations. Naval commanders were to receive a dirk with the same ornamentation, but none of them received the award during the period that it was issued. On the same day, Ieronim Uborevich received the award for his command of a field army during the North Caucasus Operation. Shortly afterwards, another VTsIK decree retroactively regularized the awards to Kamenev and Shorin, integrating the previous ceremonial weapon presentations into the new system.

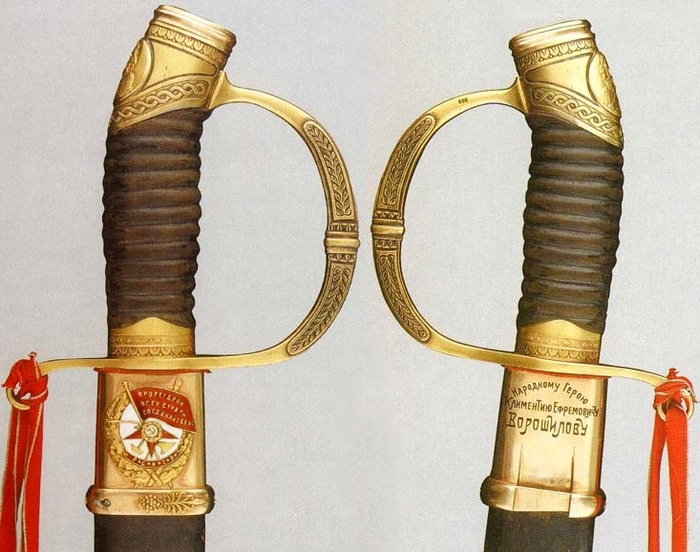
Honorary Revolutionary Weapon awarded to Kliment Voroshilov

The next group of awards came in November 1920, when Mikhail Frunze, Kliment Voroshilov, Filipp Mironov, August Kork, and Nikolai Kashirin received honorary revolutionary weapons for their leadership during the Perekop–Chongar Offensive, while Semyon Timoshenko received one for his actions during the Polish–Soviet War. Awards to eight commanders for actions either during the Russian Civil War or the suppression of the Kronstadt rebellion followed in 1921 and 1922. Kamenev and Budyonny were each awarded a second honorary revolutionary weapon on 5 January 1921 for further merits, this time in the form of a Mauser C96 pistol with the badge of the Order of the Red Banner embedded in the pistol grip. Plaques on the pistols were inscribed with the name of the recipient and the inscriptions "RSFSR" and "from the VTsIK."

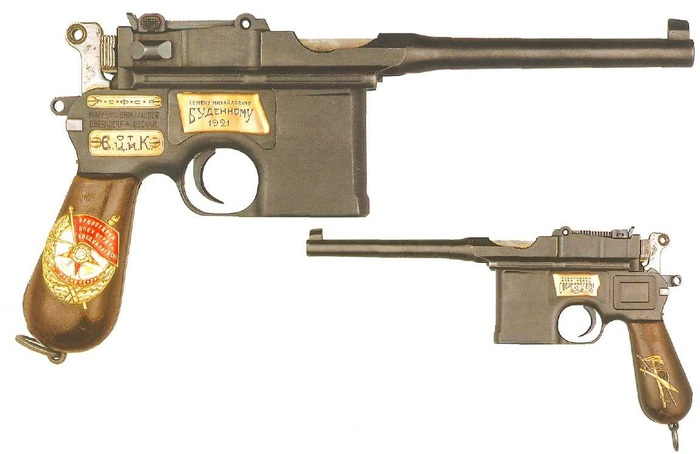
C96 awarded to Budyonny

The award was modified on 12 December 1924 by a decree of the Presidium of the Central Executive Committee of the Soviet Union, which replaced the 1920 decree. It expanded the definition of the award to include a personal revolver in addition to the sword. The decree stipulated that the badge of the Order of the Red Banner and a silver plaque inscribed "To an Honorable Soldier of the Workers' and Peasants' Red Army from the Central Executive Committee of the USSR" were to be inscribed on the revolver grip. The Honorary Revolutionary Weapon in sword form was last awarded to Stepan Vostretsov, its only recipient under the 1924 decree, on 23 April 1930 for his leadership during the Sino-Soviet War of 1929; no further issues of the firearm form occurred after those for Kamenev and Budyonny. The award never found a permanent place in the Soviet awards system, and the title Hero of the Soviet Union was established in 1934 as the highest distinction of the state. As a commemorative item, in 1968, gilt swords were presented to 26 marshals and generals in honor of the fiftieth anniversary of the Soviet Army.

== Recipients ==
The Honorary Revolutionary Weapon as a shashka was awarded to 21 commanders, with Kamenev and Budyonny receiving both the shashka and pistol:

- Sergey Kamenev (8 August 1919 and 5 January 1921)
- Vasily Shorin (8 August 1919)
- Semyon Budyonny (20 November 1919 and 5 January 1921)
- Mikhail Tukhachevsky (17 December 1919)
- Ieronim Uborevich (8 April 1920)
- Mikhail Frunze (25 November 1920)
- Kliment Voroshilov (25 November 1920)
- Filipp Mironov (25 November 1920)
- August Kork (25 November 1920)
- Nikolai Kashirin (25 November 1920)
- Semyon Timoshenko (28 November 1920)
- Vladimir Nesterovich (5 January 1921)
- Yakov Balakhonov (2 February 1921)
- Vasily Vinnikov-Bessmertny (2 February 1921)
- Alexander Yegorov (17 February 1921)
- Yevgeny Kazansky (3 June 1921)
- Grigory Kotovsky (20 September 1921)
- Voldemar Roze (12 December 1921)
- Grigory Khakhanyan (12 December 1921)
- Ivan Kutyakov (28 April 1922)
- Stepan Vostretsov (23 April 1930)
