= Mikhail Korobeinikov =

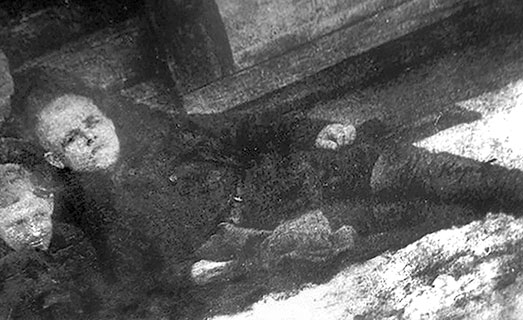
Vasily Alekseevich Korobeinkov

Cornet Vasily Alekseevich Korobeinikov (erroneously indicated as Mikhail Yakovlevich Russian: Коробейников Василий Алексеевич) (July 14, 1893 —April 24, 1924, Harbin) was one of the leaders of the Yakut Revolt.

Little is known about his early years in the White movement. Mikhail Korobeinikov headed the Yakut Revolt in September, 1921. His detachment consisted of about 200 strong soldiers. Mikhail Korobeinikov proclaimed himself the Commander-in-Chief of the Yakut People's Army made up together with detachments of yesaul Bochkaryev and Ksenofontov. In March 1922 they established the Provisional Yakut Regional People's Government in Churapcha. The army existed from September 1921 to June, 1923. Mikhail Korobeinikov's troops besieged and took Yakutsk on March 27, 1922. In the end of July the Yakut People's Army was ousted from Yakutsk and fled to Okhotsk and Ayan.

On 30 August, the Pacific Ocean Flotilla, crewed by about 750 volunteers under General Anatoly Pepelyayev, sailed from Vladivostok to assist the uprising. Three days later, this force disembarked in Ayan and moved upon Yakutsk. By the end of October, when Pepelyayev occupied the town of Nelkan, he learned that the Red Army had wrested Vladivostok from the White Army and the Civil War was over. The remains of the White Army were defeated near Okhotsk on 6 June 1923 and near Ayan on 16 June 1923.

Mikhail Korobeinikov and the remains of his army fled to China. He lived and died in Harbin.
