= The Winter Road =

Documentary novel by Leonid Yuzefovich

- First edition
- Author: Leonid Yuzefovich
- Original title: Зимняя дорога
- Language: Russian
- Genre: documentary novel
- Publisher: AST Yelena Shubina
- Publication date: 2015
- Publication place: Russia
- Media type: Print (Hardback)
- Pages: 432
- ISBN: 978-5-17-090038-1

The Winter Road (Russian: Зимняя дорога, Zimnaya doroga) is a documentary novel by Leonid Yuzefovich dedicated to the Yakut Revolt. It was published in September 2015. In 2016 the book won First Prize of the Big Book Award and the National Bestseller Literary Prize.

The plot of The Winter Road is completely devoid of fiction and based on real events. Yuzefovich studied historical documents and personally interpreted this historical event.

The novel has the author's subtitle General A. N. Pepelyaev and anarchist I. Ya. Strod in Yakutia. 1922—1923. Documentary novel (Russian: Генерал А. Н. Пепеляев и анархист И. Я. Строд в Якутии. 1922—1923 годы. Документальный роман).
