= Dmitry Bykov =

Russian writer, poet and literary critic

- Дмитрий Быков
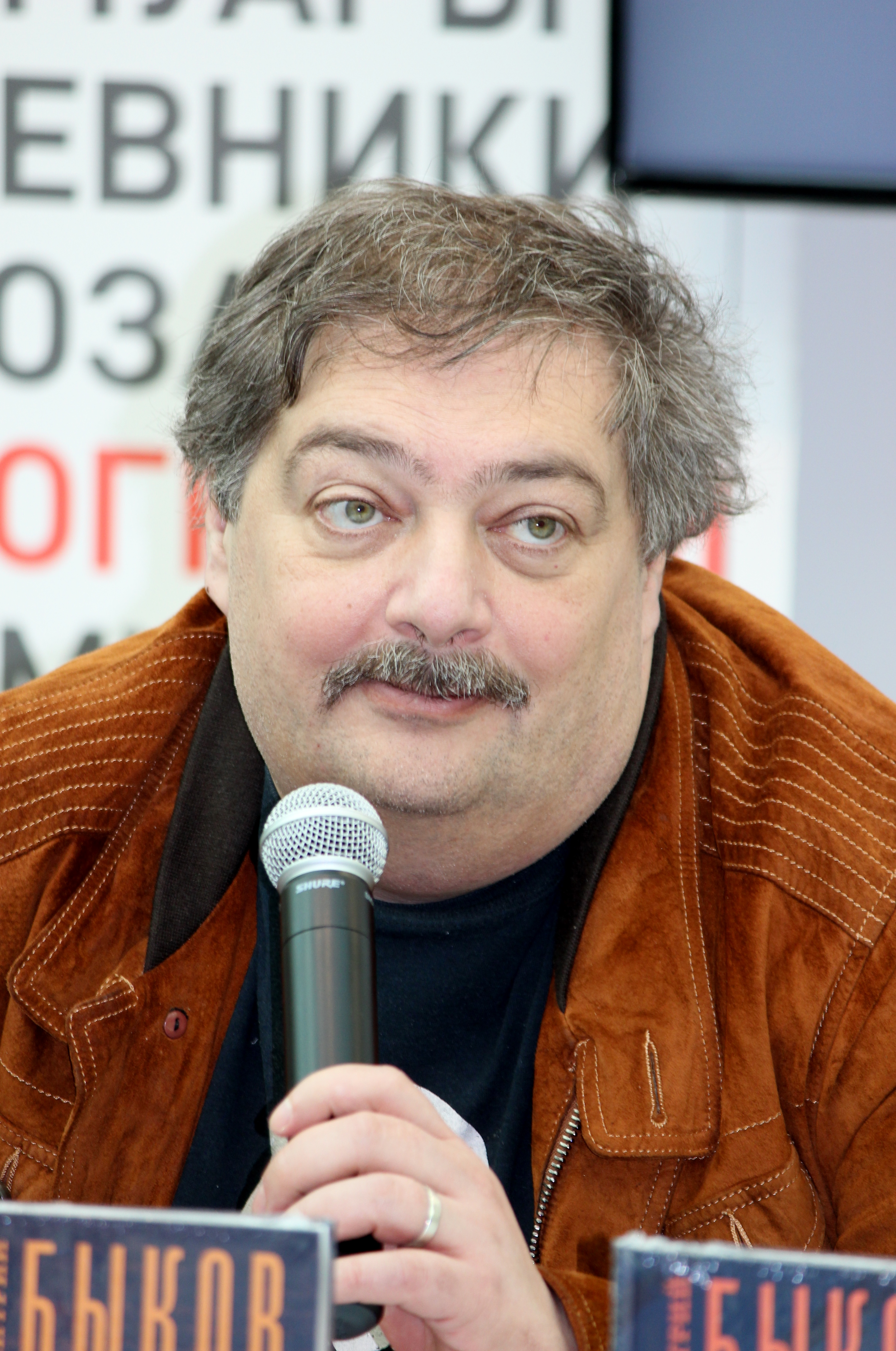
- Bykov in 2021
- Born: Dmitry Lvovich Zilbertrud; 20 December 1967 (age 58); Moscow, Russian SFSR, Soviet Union
- Citizenship: Russia
- Education: Moscow State University
- Occupations: Writer; poet; journalist
- Writing career
- Language: Russian
- Period: 1985–present
- Genres: Belles-lettres; documentary prose; biography
- Notable awards: Big Book (2006, 2011, 2018), National Bestseller 2011

Dmitry Lvovich Bykov (né Zlibertrud; Russian: Дмитрий Львович Быков, IPA: [ˈdmʲitrʲɪj ˈlʲvovʲɪdʑ ˈbɨkəf]; born 20 December 1967) is a Russian writer, poet, literary critic and journalist. He is also known as biographer of Boris Pasternak, Bulat Okudzhava and Maxim Gorky.

== Biography ==
Born into a Jewish family, his father was a prominent medical scholar, Lev Zilbertrud.

Bykov graduated from the Faculty of Journalism of the elite Moscow State University. Dmitry Bykov taught literature and the history of Soviet literature in Moscow's secondary schools. He was a professor at the Department of World Literature and Culture of Moscow State Institute of International Relations (MGIMO), often considered the most elite university of the USSR. As a journalist and critic, Bykov has been writing for the magazine Ogoniok since 1993. He has also periodically hosted a show on the radio station Echo of Moscow, which ran until 2008. Earlier, he was one of the hosts of an influential TV show Vremechko.

Being one of the most prolific modern Russian writers, he gained additional recognition for his biography of Boris Pasternak published in 2005. The biography earned Bykov the 2006 National Bestseller (Национальный бестселлер) and Big Book (Большая Книга) awards. He later wrote influential biographies of Maxim Gorky and Bulat Okudzhava.

In 2008 a documentary called Virginity (Девственность) was released in which Bykov was a co-writer.

In 2009, Bykov was named assistant editor-in-chief of the weekly magazine Profile. He is also the editor-in-chief of the monthly literature-focused magazine What to Read (Что читать).

Together with actor Mikhail Yefremov, he created project "Citizen Poet" (a pun on Nikolay Nekrasov's poem "Poet and Citizen"). Yefremov reads poems, written by Bykov, which are usually satirical comments on contemporary Russian society, politics and culture. Each poem parodies the style of a famous poet of the past, e.g. Pushkin, Nekrasov, Kipling, among others. It was originally broadcast on TV Rain channel, but the project was closed because the poems were too critical of the Russian government. For years, the show had been hosted in audio format by Echo of Moscow radio station.

In 2022 Bykov, who has criticized the Russian invasion of Ukraine, was declared by Russian Ministry of Justice to be a "foreign agent". Subsequently, many booksellers started withdrawing sales of his books in Russia. Since being declared a "foreign agent", Bykov has been fined for not declaring his status as such, and is subject to a criminal case. On July 14, 2025, it was reported that Dmitry Bykov was added to Russia's federal wanted list for spreading false information about the Armed Forces of the Russian Federation (Article 207.3), as well as for evading duties required by foreign agents (Article 330.1).

Since 2022, Bykov was a visiting critic in the Institute for European Studies in Cornell University. In 2024, he was named Inaugural Humanities Center Scholar in Exile at the University of Rochester, where he then began teaching in the Department of Modern Languages and Literatures.

On September 11, 2025, Bykov was added to Rosfinmonitoring's list of terrorists and extremists. In October, Bykov was sentenced in absentia to seven years.

=== Poisoning ===
Dmitry Bykov's voice
From an interview with Echo Moscow, 14 June 2011

In mid-April 2019, while aboard a domestic flight en route to Ufa, Bykov fainted and was hospitalized upon arrival. Initially, Russian media covered the story regarding Bykov's health status in different ways. Echo of Moscow reported that a chronic illness was responsible for Bykov's condition, which was specified by online portal Otkrytyye media as being diabetes, and that Bykov suffering from a hyperglycemic crisis. In addition, a source told RIA Novosti that Bykov had experienced severe circulatory failures in his brain.

However, the next week, on 25 April, Bykov denied having diabetes. After the doctors at the hospital in Ufa told him that they could not find the cause of his illness, he concluded that it was poisoning. In early September 2020, Aric Toler, director of research and training at Bellingcat, suspected that a nerve poison was used. The possible poisoning of Bykov by Russian government agents was reportedly investigated, along with other similar cases, by Christo Grozev of Bellingcat. Bellingcat describes a "striking resemblance" between the poisoning of Bykov and the poisoning of Alexei Navalny.

== Bibliography ==
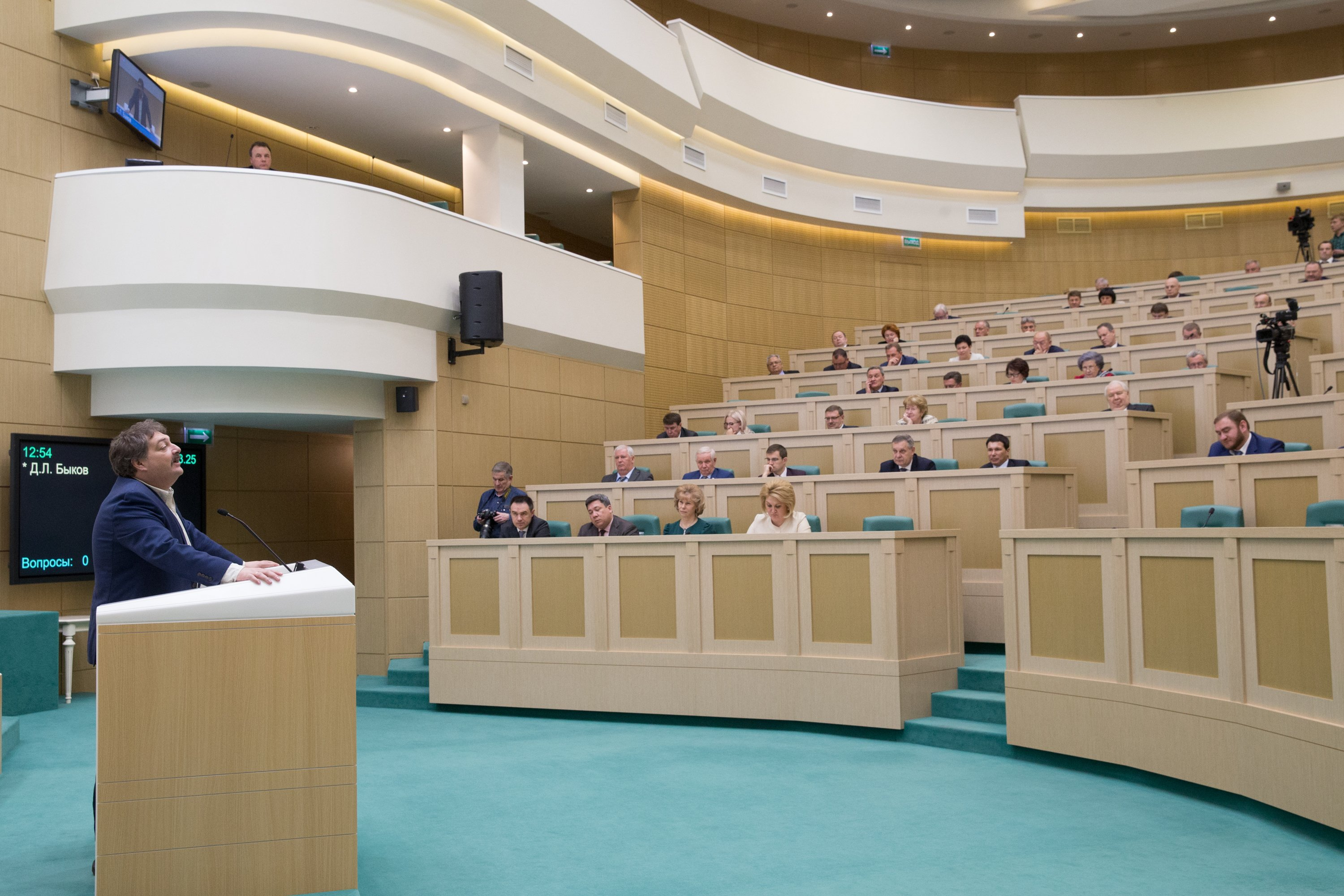
Dmitry Bykov spoke at a meeting of the Federation Council, 8 November 2017

=== Prose fiction ===
- Justification («Оправдание», 2001)
- Orthography («Орфография», 2003)
- In the World of Animals: A Children's Book for Adults, An Adults' Book for Children, with Irina Luk'ianova («В мире животиков. Детская книга для взрослых, взрослая книга для детей», 2005)
- How Putin Became President of the USA: New Russian Fairy Tales («Как Путин стал президентом США: новые русские сказки», 2005)
- Truth, with Maksim Chertanov («Правда», 2005)
- Removal Service («Эвакуатор», 2005)
- ZhD, or Living Souls («ЖД», 2006)
- ZhD Short Stories («ЖД-рассказы», 2007)
- Listed out («Списанные», 2008)
- Ostromov, or The Magician's Apprentice («Остромов, или Ученик чародея», 2010)
- Farewell to the Cuckoo («Прощай, кукушка», 2011)
- Male Carriage («Мужской вагон», 2012)
- X («Икс», 2012)
- The Signals, with Valeria Zharova («Сигналы», 2013)
- The Block: A Walktrough («Квартал: прохождение», 2014)

=== Biographies ===
- Boris Pasternak («Борис Пастернак», 2005)
- Was Gorky real? («Был ли Горький?», 2008)
- Bulat Okudzhava («Булат Окуджава», 2009)

=== Books of essays ===
- The Debauchery of Work («Блуд труда», 2003)
- Chronicles of Immediate War («Хроники ближайшей войны», 2005)
- In Place of Life («Вместо жизни», 2006)
- In a Void («На пустом месте», 2008)
- Thinking the World («Думание мира», 2009)
- And Practically Everybody («И все-все-все», 2009, 2011)
- The Calendar. Speaking of Essential Things («Календарь. Разговоры о главном», 2010)
- The Calendar 2. Debating the Undebatable («Календарь-2. Споры о бесспорном», 2012)
- The Secret Russian Calendar. Most important dates(«Тайный русский календарь. Главные даты», 2012)
- The Short Course of Soviet Literature («Советская литература. Краткий курс», 2012). later republished as The Advanced Course of Soviet Literature («Советская литература. Расширенный курс»)

=== Poetry ===
- Declaration of Independence («Декларация независимости», 1992)
- A Letter to a Young Man («Послание к юноше», 1994)
- Military Coup («Военный переворот», 1996)
- Reprieve («Отсрочка», 2000)
- The Recruit («Призывник», 2003)
- Chain Letters («Письма счастья», 2006)
- Last Time («Последнее время», 2007)
- The Report («Отчет», 2010)
- New Chain Letters («Новые письма счастья», 2010)
- Actually («На самом деле», 2011)
- New and Newest Chain Letters («Новые и новейшие письма счастья», 2012)
- Bliss («Блаженство», 2014)

=== Drama ===
- The Bear («Медведь», 2010)
