= 1921 Yakut revolt =

1921–1923 uprising during the Russian Civil War

- Part of the Eastern Front of the Russian Civil War
Date	2 September 1921 – 16 June 1923
Location	Ayano-Maysky District of the Russian Far East
Result	Soviet victory: End of the Russian Civil War
Territorial changes	Dissolution of the Provisional Priamurye Government

Belligerents
Russian SFSR; Far Eastern Republic; Soviet Union (from 30 December 1922)	(Russia) White Army: Provisional Yakut Regional People's Government; Siberian volunteer squad

Commanders and leaders
(Russian Soviet Federative Socialist Republic) Ivan Strod (Russian Soviet Federative Socialist Republic) Stepan Vostretsov (Far Eastern Republic) Nestor Kalandarishvili †	Before 2 September 1921 (Russia) Mikhail Korobeinikov; After 2 September 1921; Anatoly Pepelyayev (POW)

Strength
5,000	1,500~5,000

The 1921 Yakut revolt (Russian: Якутский мятеж, romanized: Yakutsky myatezh) or the Yakut expedition (Russian: Якутский поход, romanized: Yakutsky pokhod) was the last episode and final set of military engagements of the Russian Civil War. The hostilities took place between September 1921 and June 1923 and were centered on the Ayano-Maysky District of the Russian Far East.

== Chronology ==
An uprising flared up in this part of Yakutia in September 1921. About 200 White Russians were led by Cornet Mikhail Korobeinikov. The Communist Party sent more troops to deal with the revolt. Among the reinforcements was a contingent of the Far Eastern Republic, led by Nestor Kalandarishvili, which arrived to assist in counter-insurgency operations in January 1922. In March 1922, the Whites established the Provisional Yakut Regional People's Government in Churapcha. On 6 March, Kalandarishvili's unit was ambushed and he was reportedly killed by the insurgents. However, historians have also proposed that he may have been murdered in an internal purge by local Bolsheviks who regarded him as a potential threat to their power or politically unreliable. On 23 March, Korobeinikov's Yakut People's Army, armed with six machine guns, captured the major town of Yakutsk. The Red Army garrison was decimated.

In April, the White Army contacted the Provisional Priamurye Government in Vladivostok, asking for help. On 27 April, the Russian Bolshevik government declared the Yakut ASSR and sent an expedition to put down the uprising. In summer 1922, the Whites were ousted from Yakutsk and withdrew to the Pacific coast. They occupied the port towns of Okhotsk and Ayan and again asked Vladivostok for reinforcements.

On 30 August, the Pacific Ocean Fleet, crewed by about 750 volunteers under Lieutenant General Anatoly Pepelyayev, sailed from Vladivostok to assist the White Russian forces. Three days later, this force disembarked in Ayan and moved upon Yakutsk. By the end of October, when Pepelyayev captured the locality of Nelkan, he learned that the Bolsheviks had wrested Vladivostok from the White Army and the Civil War was over.

When the Soviet Union was formed on 30 December 1922, the only Russian territory still controlled by the White Movement was the region of the Pepelyayevshchina ("пепеляевщина"), so-called in the Soviet historiography, that is, Ayan, Okhotsk and Nelkan. A unit of Bolshevik forces under Ivan Strod was sent against Pepelyayev in February 1923. On 12 February, they defeated Pepelyayev's forces near Sasyl-Sasyg; in March, the White Army retreated from Amga.

On 24 April 1923, the ships Stavropol and Indigirka sailed from Vladivostok for Ayan. They contained a contingent of the Red Army under Stepan Vostretsov. Upon his arrival in Ayan on 6 April, Vostretsov learned that Pepelyayev had evacuated to Nelkan. The remainder of the White Army were defeated near Okhotsk on 6 June and near Ayan on 16 June. 103 White officers and 230 soldiers were taken prisoner and transported to Vladivostok. Pepelyayev himself was captured after the battle of Ayan, and he would spend the next 13 years in the gulag camps before being executed during the Stalinist purges in 1938.

== See also ==
- The Winter Road
