= Galina Yuzefovich =

20th Century Russian Literary Critic

- Гали́на Леони́довна Юзефо́вич
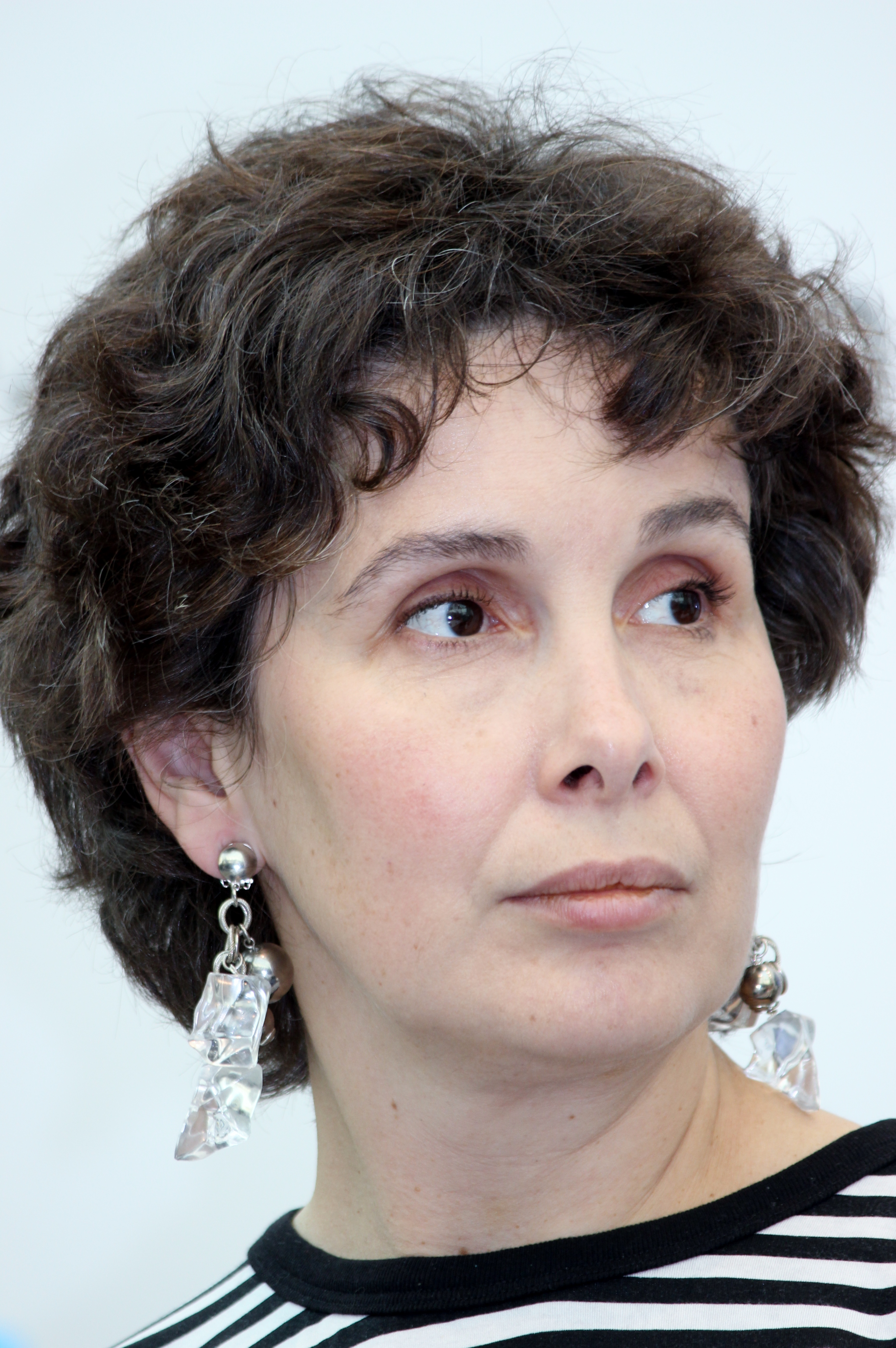
- Born: August 16, 1975 (age 51); Perm
- Occupation: literary critic
- Parents: Leonid Yuzefovich (father); Anna Berdichevskaya (mother)

Galina Leonidovna Yuzefovich (Russian: Гали́на Леони́довна Юзефо́вич) is a prominent Russian literary critic, teacher, and columnist.

== Biography ==
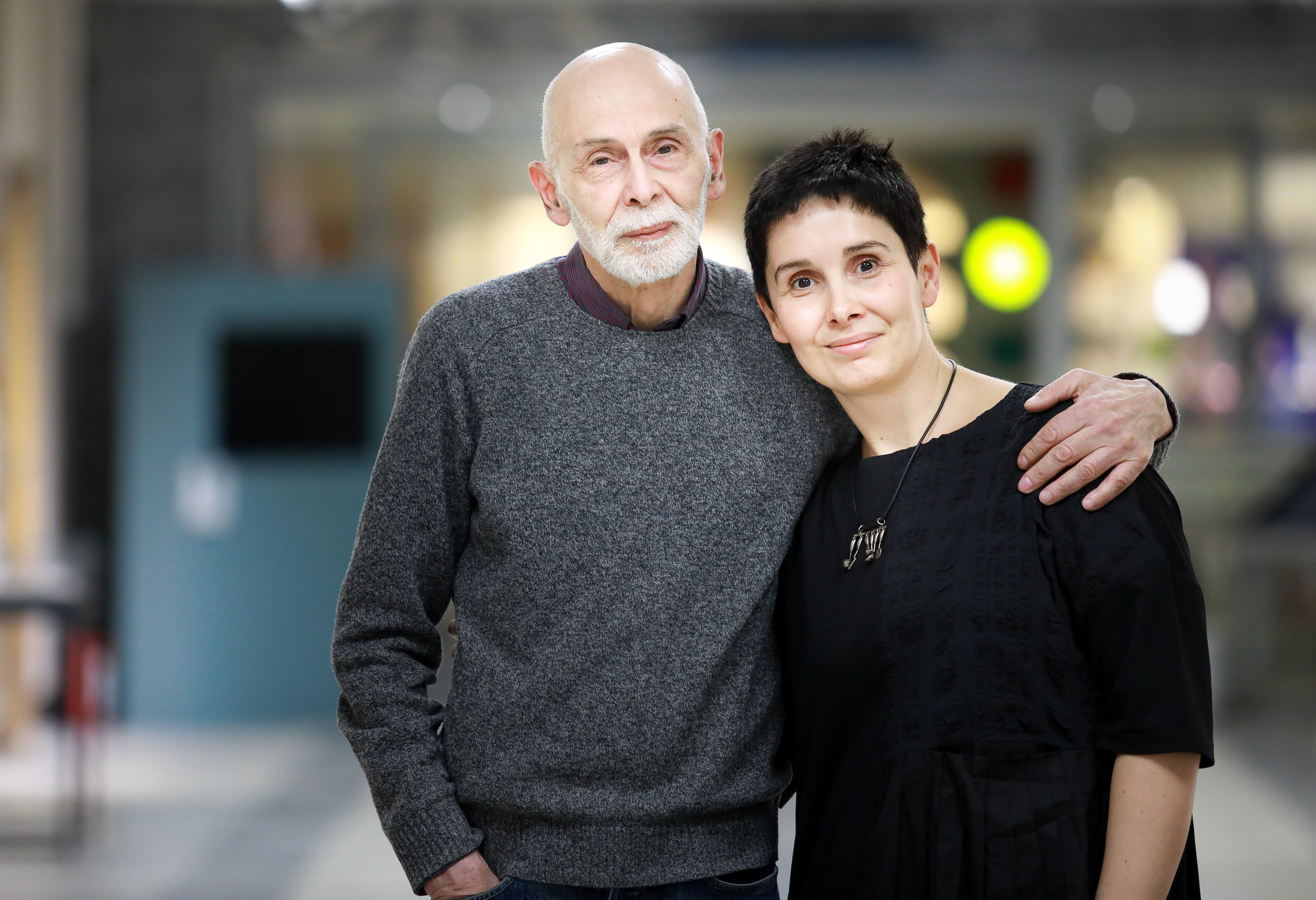
With father Leonid Yuzefovich in 2018

Galina is the daughter of two prominent Russian writers Anna Berdichevskaya and Leonid Yuzefovich.

Galina graduated from the Russian State University for the Humanities in 1999. By then, she had already started publishing her literary reviews. Her reviews have been published both in specialized literary magazines such as Znamya and Oktyabr and general media such as Vedomosti, Ogoniok, Expert, Itogi, etc.

In 2014-2023, Yuzefovich was running a weekly column in Meduza about book business and new releases. She confessed to read at least 3 books per week, looking through 5 more.

Since early 2010s, Yuzefovich has been widely considered to be one of the most influential literary critics in Russia. She hosted a radio show on Mayak, made regular appearances in prime time TV shows, and led a course on literary criticism in Moscow Creative Writing School. In 2013, she joined the jury of the Russian literary award NOS Award.

In 2016 Yuzefovich released a collection of essays under the title ‘Wonderous adventures of the pilot-fish: 150,000 words on literature’ («Удивительные приключения рыбы-лоцмана: 150 000 слов о литературе»). In 2018, she released her second book ‘Bestsellers. How Everything Works in the World of Literature’ («О чём говорят бестселлеры. Как всё устроено в книжном мире»). In 2020, Yuzefovich released her new book, ‘Mysterious Map’ (ru «Таинственная карта»).

Yuzefovich publicly condemned the 2022 Russian invasion of Ukraine. Soon, she launched a podcast on Meduza, dedicated to role of books and reading as possible soothe for soul in war time.

== Bibliography ==
- Vladimirsky, Vasily (2016). "Бежать в два раза быстрее" [Run two times faster]. Новый Мир (in Russian). Archived from the original on 2017-06-26.
- Sonin, K. I. (2018). "Одна победа Галины Юзефович" [One Victory of Galina Yuzefovich]. Книжная ярмарка ДК им. Крупской (in Russian). Archived from the original on 2019-04-23.
