= Leonid Yuzefovich =

Russian writer (born 1947)

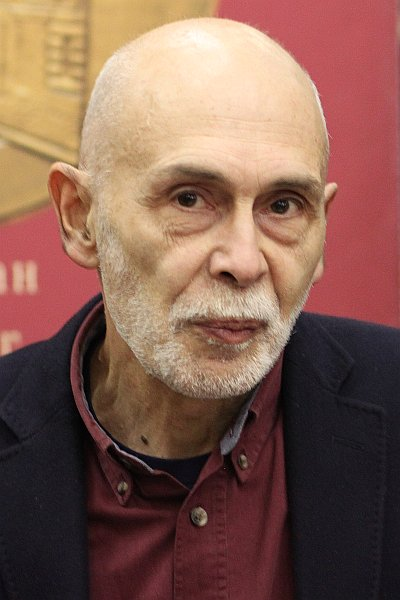
- Yuzefovich in 2010.
- Born: Leonid Abramovich Yuzefovich; December 18, 1947 (age 78); Moscow, Russia
- Writing career
- Period: 1970s–present
- Genre: Crime fiction

Leonid Abramovich Yuzefovich (Russian: Леонид Абрамович Юзефович, born December 18, 1947, in Moscow) is a Russian writer known for the series of crime fiction stories taking place in pre-Revolution Russian Empire. He also writes non-fiction books about history, and currently adapts his stories for TV serials.

In 1975, he started working as a history teacher at a Moscow school and only retired in 2004 despite being in love with teaching. In 1981 he earned his Ph.D. (Candidate of Sciences) with his thesis on Russian diplomatic etiquette of the 15th-17th centuries.

His early fiction works were occasionally published in the USSR through the late 1970s and 1980s but he mostly owed his initial popularity to the well-distributed non-fiction book The Sovereign of the Desert about Roman Ungern von Sternberg, issued in 1993. It influenced Victor Pelevin's novel Chapayev and Void, issued in 1996.

He gained more popularity when in 2001 he switched to detective stories set in the late 19th century, re-inventing the fame of detective Ivan Putilin.

In 2003 the Russian Booker Prize short-listed Yuzefovich's detective story Kazaroza.

Yuzefovich became the main winner of the 2009 Big Book, the Russian national literary award, for his novel Cranes and Pygmies on November 26.

He won the National Bestseller Literary Prize in 2016 for his book The Winter Road.

Yuzefovich's books have been translated and issued in English, French, German, Italian, Mongolian, Polish, and Spanish languages.

Yuzefovich's daughter Galina is a literary critic, by peers she is considered the most influential in her field.
