= History of the Jews in Mongolia =

The history of the Jews in Mongolia dates to the 19th century, when Jewish merchants from Siberia established trade links with Mongolian communities. A small Jewish population developed in the early 20th century, primarily composed of Russian Jews fleeing the Russian Civil War. In June 1921, the community in Urga (now Ulaanbaatar) was massacred under the orders of White Russian warlord Roman von Ungern-Sternberg.

Today, Mongolia’s Jewish population is very small, numbering fewer than 100 individuals. There is no synagogue or communal infrastructure. A Jewish-interest group, Mongol-Jewish Cooperation, was formed in 2003 to promote awareness of Judaism and Israel among Mongolians.

== History ==
Before 1920, most Jews who arrived in Mongolia were of Russian background and had fled the chaos of the Russian Civil War.

In June 1921, this community was massacred under orders from White Russian warlord Roman von Ungern-Sternberg, who instructed his forces to kill "all Jews, Bolsheviks and Chinese soldiers." The killings were carried out by Captain Feodoroff. One known survivor, Israel-Eli (Alexander) Zanzer, had assimilated into Mongolian society and held a noble title before eventually fleeing to Poland, where he was murdered during the Holocaust.

Despite the massacre, Jewish migration resumed a few years later, primarily from Russia.

In 1925–6, a Russian-Jewish journalist came across a community of 50 newly settled families in a remote region of Outer Mongolia approximately 320 kilometres (200 miles) from the Manchurian border. In 1926, Ulaanbaatar had a population of 600 Russian Jews who had attempted to leave Outer Mongolia, which was a Soviet satellite state at the time.

During World War II, Soviet authorities relocated thousands of Lithuanian Jews to Soviet Mongolia and Eastern Siberia. The Jewish community in Mongolia faded during the Communist era.

=== Post-Soviet Union ===
After the breakup of the Soviet Union, a number of Jewish citizens left the country in search of better economic opportunities. Some left for Israel, which had a visa agreement with Mongolia.

== Present day ==
A few Israeli tourists visit Mongolia in the summer, and the two countries have a mutual agreement for visa exemptions.

In 2003, the Mongol-Jewish Cooperation was formed, and its website answers questions about subjects such as Judaism and Israel. The organization's head, Sumati Luvsandendev, has said, "there are enough fingers on two hands to count all Jews who live here." The closest Jewish community with a rabbi is the Siberian city of Irkutsk, whose Chief Rabbi Aharon Wagner seeks to maintain close contact with the neighboring Mongolian Jewish community.

Israeli businessman Yair Jacob Porat has spearheaded efforts to revive Jewish life in Mongolia. Since settling in Ulaanbaatar in 1996, he has hosted holiday gatherings, distributed matzah, and imported kosher food. In 2024, he commissioned the delivery of a Torah scroll, the first in living memory to reach the country. Porat’s home functions as a de facto synagogue, although there is no regular minyan. Porat has also worked to uncover and preserve the memory of the 1921 massacre. Through archival research and local interviews, he identified what is believed to be the mass grave site within the Russian Orthodox cemetery in Ulaanbaatar. Among the Jewish gravestones found are a 1937 stone marked with a Star of David and a monument indicating a mass burial of 15 men.

== See also ==
- History of the Jews in Central Asia
- History of the Jews in Russia
- History of the Jews in China
