= Brethren Cemetery (Rostov-on-Don) =

Cemetery in Rostov-on-Don, Russia

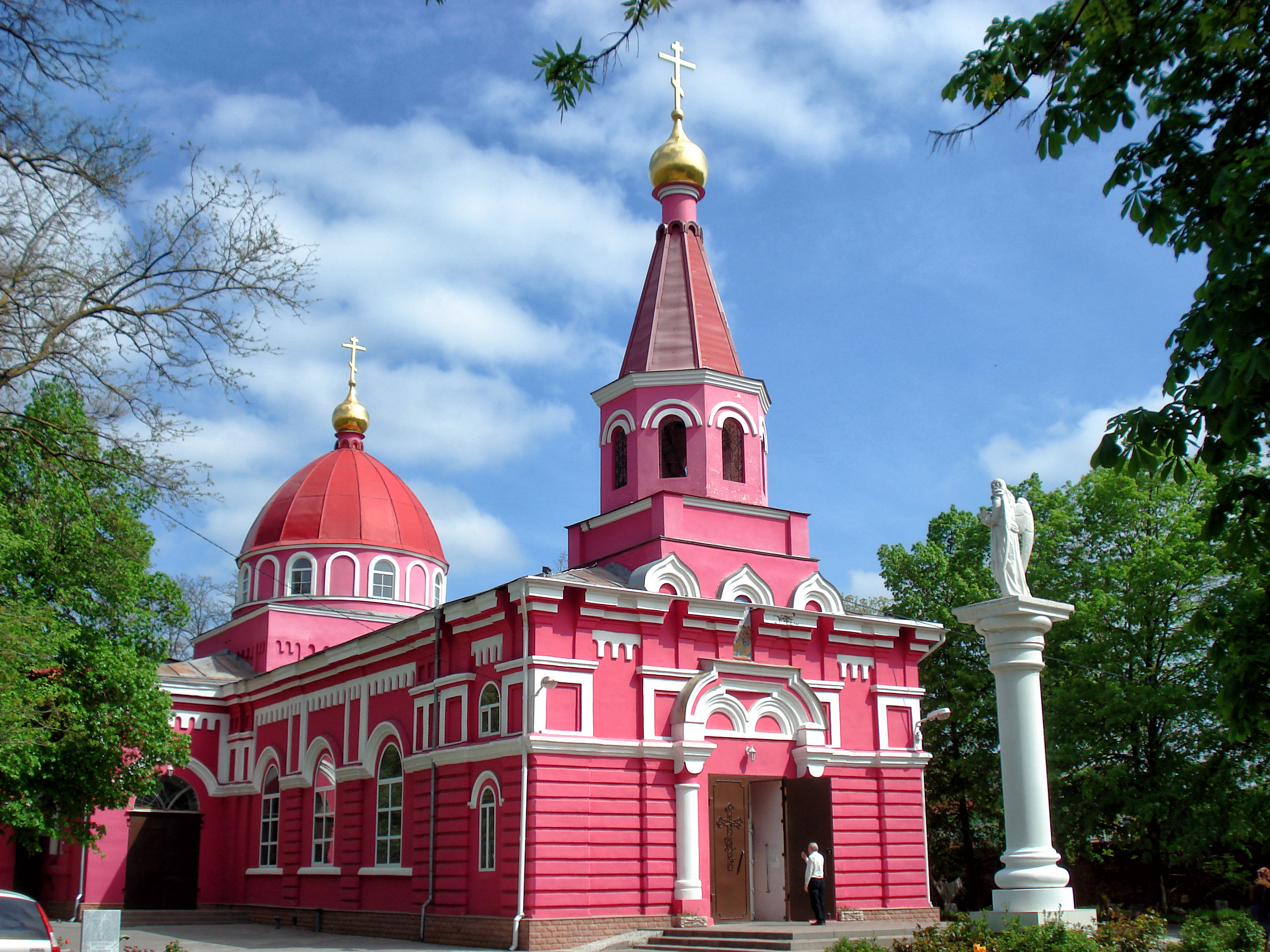
- Church of the Ascension of the Lord at the Brethren Cemetery

Details
- Location: Rostov-on-Don
- Country: Russia
- Coordinates: 47°14′32″N 39°42′59″E
- Size: 2.2 km^{2}

The Brethren Cemetery (Russian: Братское кладбище) is a cemetery at Oktyabrskiy District of the city of Rostov-on-Don, Russia.

== History ==
The cemetery, on the outskirts of the city, was inititllay considered to be a place for burial of the poor, here there were mostly brethren graves. So the cemetery's name derived from here. Later, a section for deceased soldiers and officers appeared at the cemetery, which mostly hasn't survived until our days.

The cemetery has monuments dedicated to soldiers of Rostov-on-Don People's Militia Regiment, who died in November 1941 and a monument in honor of soldiers the 230th NKVD Regiment who also died in November 1941 while defending Rostov-on-Don from invading German forces. From 1998 it is permitted to bury relatives of the ones already buried at the territory of the cemetery.

== Famous people buried at the Brethren Cemetery ==
- Borys Dumenko – a commander of the Red Army
- Leonid Eberg – an architect who worked in Rostov-on-Don
- Alexander Borchaninov – a revolutionary and a statesman
