= Sanaga, Republic of Buryatia =

Sanaga Санага
- Selo
- Location within Republic of Buryatia Location within Russia
- Coordinates: 50°43′N 102°48′E
- Country: Russia
- Region: Republic of Buryatia
- District: Zakamensky District
- Time zone: UTC+8:00

Sanaga (Russian: Санага) is a rural locality (a selo) in Zakamensky District, Republic of Buryatia, Russia. The population was 1,832 as of 2010. There are 29 streets.

== Geography ==
Sanaga is located 78 km northwest of Zakamensk (the district's administrative centre) by road. Utata is the nearest rural locality.
