= Centrosibir =

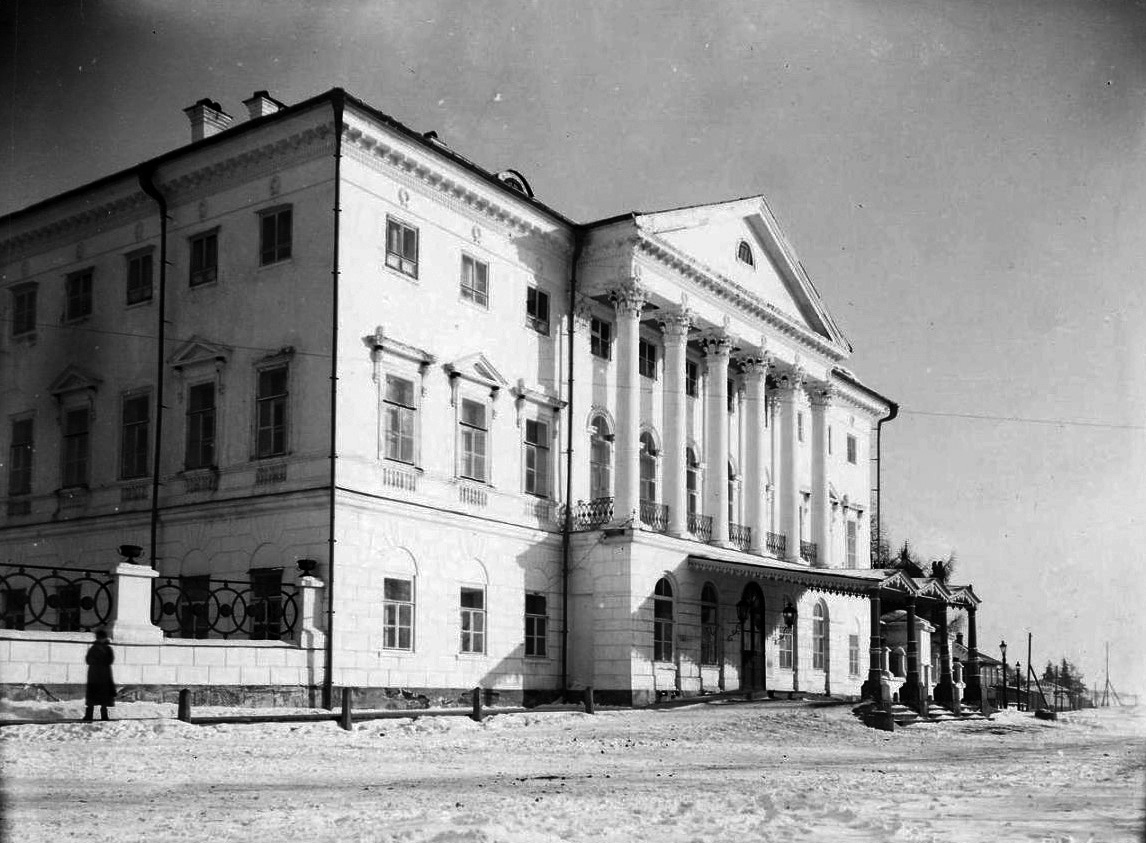
The White House in Irkutsk, where Centrosibir was active

Centrosibir (Russian: Центросибирь), short for the Central Executive Committee of Siberian Soviets, was elected by the First Congress of Siberian Soviets, held in Irkutsk from 29 October [O.S. 16 October] 1917 to 6 November [O.S. 24 October] 1917. The task of Centrosibir was to coordinate the activities of Siberian Soviet between their congresses. N. N. Yakovlev was the Executive Chairman of Centrosibir.

After the temporary downfall of Soviet power in Siberia, Centrosibir ceased to function in the summer of 1918.
