= Eurocon =

Science fiction convention

Eurocon is an annual science fiction convention held in Europe. The organising committee of each Eurocon is selected by a vote of the participants of the previous event. The procedure is coordinated by the European Science Fiction Society. The first Eurocon was held in Trieste, Italy, in 1972. Unlike Worldcons, Eurocon is usually a title attached to an existing convention. The European SF Awards are given in most of the conventions giving recognition to the best works and achievements in science fiction.

== List of Eurocons ==
	Year	City	Country	Convention Name	Guests of honor and other information
1st	1972	Trieste	Italy	Eurocon 1	John Brunner, Kurt Steiner (André Ruellan) and Roberto Vacca. Forrest Ackerman was in attendance, as well as Brian Aldiss, Peter Nicholls, Gianfranco Viviani for Editrice Nord, Ubaldo Fanucci for Fanucci Editore, Inisero Cremaschi and his wife Gilda Musa, Patrice Duvic, the Italian poet Andrea Zanzotto, Sandro Sandrelli, Renato Pestriniero, the Hungarian writer and editor Peter Kuczka, Gustavo Gasparini who was also toastmaster, Karel Thole, Riccardo Valla, Gianfranco De Turris, the French writer Daniel Drode, and Carlo Frabetti.
2nd	1974	Grenoble	France	Eurocon 2	
3rd	1976	Poznań	Poland	Eurocon 3	Brian Aldiss
4th	1978	Brussels	Belgium	Eurocon 4	A.E. van Vogt, Alexander Zinoviev, Angélica Gorodischer, Frank Kelly Freas
5th	1980	Stresa	Italy	Eurocon 5	
6th	1982	Mönchengladbach	West Germany	Eurocon 6	John Brunner, Wiktor Bukato, Wolfgang Jeschke, Josef Nesvadba, Kathinka Lannoy
7th	1983	Ljubljana	Yugoslavia	Eurocon 7	
8th	1984	Brighton	United Kingdom	Seacon '84 / Eastercon 35	Christopher Priest, Roger Zelazny, Pierre Barbet, Josef Nesvadba and Waldemar Kumming
9th	1986	Zagreb	Yugoslavia	Ballcon	Sam J. Lundwall
10th	1987	Montpellier	France	Eurocon 1987	
11th	1988	Budapest	Hungary	Eurocon 1988	
12th	1989	San Marino	San Marino	Eurocon 1989	Frederik Pohl, Norman Spinrad
13th	1990	Fayence	France	Eurocon 1990	David Brin
14th	1991	Kraków	Poland	Cracon / Polcon 1991	
15th	1992	Freudenstadt	Germany	FreuCon XII	John Brunner, Iain Banks, Norman Spinrad, and Daniel Walther
16th	1993	Saint Helier	Jersey	Helicon / Eastercon 44	John Brunner, George R. R. Martin, Karel Thole and Larry van der Putte
17th	1994	Timișoara	Romania	Eurocon 1994	John Brunner, Herbert W. Franke, Joe Haldeman, Moebius and Norman Spinrad in addition to half a dozen 'Special Guests'.
18th	1995	Glasgow	Scotland	Intersection	Samuel R. Delany, Gerry Anderson, Les Edwards and Vin¢ Clarke (also Worldcon)
19th	1996	Vilnius	Lithuania	Lithuanicon	
20th	1997	Dublin	Ireland	Octocon	Harry Harrison
21st	1999	Dortmund	Germany	Trinity	Terry Pratchett, Harry Harrison, Ian Watson, Roger MacBride Allen, Mark Brandis and Eric A. Stillwell
22nd	2000	Gdańsk	Poland	Tricity 2000	
23rd	2001	Capidava	Romania	Atlantykron	Norman Spinrad, Joe Haldeman, Ion Hobana, and David Lewis Anderson
24th	2002	Chotěboř	Czech Republic	Parcon 2002	George R. R. Martin, Robert Holdstock, Jim Burns, Myra Cakan, Kir Bulychev, Andrzej Sapkowski, Rafał A. Ziemkiewicz, Ernst Uleck, Isobel Carmody, William King, Jaroslav Velinský, Phillipe Coriat, Ondřej Neff, Klaus N. Frick and Martina Pilcerova
25th	2003	Turku	Finland	Finncon 2003	Michael Swanwick, Steve Sansweet, Karolina Bjällerstedt Mickos, Boris Hurtta, Jonathan Clements and Björn Tore Sund
26th	2004	Plovdiv	Bulgaria	Bulgacon	Robert Sheckley, Ian Watson, Sergei Lukyanenko, Andrzej Sapkowski, Roberto Quaglia and Patrick Gyger
27th	2005	Glasgow	Scotland	Interaction	Greg Pickersgill, Christopher Priest, Robert Sheckley, Lars-Olov Strandberg and Jane Yolen (also Worldcon)
28th	2006	Kyiv	Ukraine	Eurocon 2006	Harry Harrison and Andrzej Sapkowski
29th	2007	Copenhagen	Denmark	Eurocon 2007	Anne McCaffrey, Stephen Baxter, Zoran Živković, David A. Hardy, Niels Dalgaard
30th	2008	Moscow	Russia	Eurocon 2008 / RosCon / Euroscon / Interpresscon	Harry Harrison, Sergei Lukyanenko
31st	2009	Fiuggi	Italy	DeepCon 10 / Eurocon 2009 / Italcon 35	Giuseppe Lippi, Lolita Fatjo, Marina Sirtis, Anthony Simcoe, Max Grodénchik, Larry Nemecek, Janet Nemecek, Ian Watson, Sergey Lukyanenko, Bruce Sterling, Geoffrey Landis, Mary Turzillo
32nd	2010	Cieszyn and Český Těšín Eurocon 2010 in Cieszyn and Český Těšín, Poland & Czech Republic	Poland and Czech Republic	Tricon (Polcon 2010 / Parcon 2010)	Event was organized jointly by Czech, Polish and Slovak fandoms. Guests of Honour were Juraj Červeňák (Slovakia), Andrzej Sapkowski (Poland), Miroslav Žamboch (Czech Republic) and Orson Scott Card (USA).
33rd	2011	Stockholm	Sweden	Eurocon 2011	Elizabeth Bear, Ian McDonald, John-Henri Holmberg, Jukka Halme
34th	2012	Zagreb	Croatia	Kontakt (SFeraKon 2012)	Tim Powers, Charles Stross, Dmitry Glukhovsky, Darko Macan, Cheryl Morgan. Ghosts of Honour: Joanna Russ, Andre Norton
35th	2013	Kyiv	Ukraine	Eurocon 2013	Andriy Dmytruk, Maryna and Serhiy Dyachenko, Olga Gromyko, H. L. Oldie (Dmitriy Gromov and Oleg Ladyzhensky), Christopher Priest, Vadim Panov, Andriy Valentynov
36th	2014	Dublin	Ireland	Shamrokon	Michael Carroll, Seanan McGuire, Andrzej Sapkowski, Ylva Spångberg
37th	2015	Saint Petersburg	Russia	Eurocon 2015	Joe Abercrombie, Michael Stackpole, Jukka Halme, Pavel Vinogradov
38th	2016	Barcelona	Spain	B-Con	Aliette de Bodard, Enrique Corominas (artist guest of honour), Pèter Ichaleczky (fan guest of honour), Pèter Michaleczky, Richard Morgan, Rosa Montero, Rhianna Pratchett, Albert Sánchez Piñol, Andrzej Sapkowski, Johanna Sinisalo
39th	2017	Dortmund	Germany	U.Con	Andreas Eschbach, Dave Hutchinson, Autun Purser and Aleksandar Žiljak
40th	2018	Amiens	France	Eurocon Nemo 2018	"African Science Fiction" and Volodymyr Arenev
41st	2019	Belfast	Northern Ireland	TitanCon	Guest of Honour: George R. R. Martin, Comics Guest of Honour: James Roberts, Toastmutant: Pat Cadigan & Peadar Ó Guilín
42nd	2020	Rijeka	Croatia	Futuricon	Ivana Delač, Ivica Puljak, Adrian Tchaikovsky
43rd	2021	Fiuggi	Italy	DeepCon 21 / Eurocon 2021 / Italcon 47	Marco Casolino, Giuliano Giuffrida, Shun Iwasawa, Hanne Madeleine Paine, Maurizio Manzieri, Chase Masterson, Ian McDonald, Eric A. Stillwell, Licia Troisi
44th	2022	Dudelange	Luxembourg	LuxCon, the 2022 EuroCon	Guest of Honour: Arkady Martine Other Guests: Aliette de Bodard, Vivian Shaw, Peadar Ó Guilín, Bernhard Hennen, Robert Corvus, Agnieszka Hałas, Gunilla Jonsson and Michael Petersén Virtual Guests: Marieke Nijkamp, Kai Meyer, Andreas Eschbach, Tommy Krappweis
45th	2023	Uppsala	Sweden	Konflikt	Martha Wells, Francesco Verso, Merja Polvinen and Johan Egerkrans
46th	2024	Rotterdam	Netherlands	Erasmuscon	Bo Balder, Iris Compiet, Gary Erskine, Jasper Fforde and Andrzej Sapkowski
47th	2025	Mariehamn	Åland – Finland	Archipelacon 2	Ann VanderMeer, Jeff VanderMeer, Mats Strandberg, and Emmi Itäranta

== European SF Awards ==
The European SF Awards are annual awards governed by the European Science Fiction Society. since 1972 mostly during Eurocons. The awards are given to works of fiction (science fiction or fantasy) or related to that field.

=== Rules ===
1. Must be a work of Science Fiction or Fantasy, or related to Science Fiction or Fantasy;
2. The majority of the work is by a person or a group of people who were born in, or are a citizen of, a European Country;
3. The works were first released in the two calendar years prior to the year of the current Eurocon;
4. If a work has won an ESFS Achievement award, it can not be nominated again in the same category.

Nominations are made by countries and voting for the awards occurs at the Eurocon business meeting.

==== Current annual awards ====
As of 2020, the following are awarded each year:

===== Special awards =====
- The Chrysalis Awards
- The Achievement Awards
- The Hall of Fame
- The European Grandmaster

===== Achievement Award categories =====
- Best work of Art
- Best written work of Fiction
- Best Dramatic Presentation
- Best Fanzine
- Best Work for Children
- Best Internet Publication, other than a fanzine

===== Hall of Fame Award categories =====
Winners can only be admitted once.

- Best Artist
- Best Author
- Best Publisher
- Best Promoter of Science Fiction
- Best Magazine
- Best Translator

== List of Awards given by convention ==
=== 1972 European SF Awards: Trieste, Italy ===
The first Eurocon was in Trieste.

The first Eurocon Awards were originally given as prizes to works presented at the convention itself. Years later they evolved into awards as they are commonly known relating to European authors and publications.

==== Special awards ====
- Artist: Karel Thole (Italy)
- Specialized Professional Magazine: Nueva Dimensión (Spain)
- Non-Specialized Professional Magazine: Viata Romaneasca (Romania)
- Fanzine: Speculations (United Kingdom)
- Comics: Lone Sloane, by Philippe Druillet (France)

==== Awards ====
===== Novel =====
Belgium – Sam, Paul Van Herck;
France – Ortog et les tenebres, Kurt Steiner;
Hungary – A Feladat, Peter Zsoldos;
Italy – Autocrisi, Pierfrancesco Prosperi;
Netherlands – De Naakten en de Speyers, Jacob Carossa;
Romania – Va cauta untaur, Sergiu Farcasan;
Spain – Amor en una Isla Verde, Gabriel Bermudez;
Sweden – Deta är Verkligheten, Bertil Matensson;
United Kingdom – All Judgement Fled, James White;

===== Short Story =====
Belgium – De 8 jaarlijkse God Eddy C. Bertin;
France – L'Assassinat de l'Oiseau Bleu, Daniel Walther;
Hungary – Sempiternin, Lajos Mesterhazi;
Italy – Dove Muore l'Astragalo, Livio Horrakh;
Netherlands – Egeïsche Zee Carl Lans;
Romania – Altarul Zeilor Stohastici Adrian Rogoz;
Sweden – Spranget, Carl Johan Holzhausen;
United Kingdom – Lucifer, Edwin Charles Tubb;

===== Dramatic Production =====
Denmark – Man Den, Der Tankte Ting (Film);
Italy – La Ragazza di Latta (The Tin Girl) by Marcello Aliprandi (Film);
Netherlands – De Kleine Mannetjes van Mars (Radiophonic play for children);
Sweden – Deadline (Film);
United Kingdom – UFO (TV series);

===== Artist =====
France – Jean-François Jamoul;
Hungary – Andras Miklos Saros;
Italy - Karel Thole;
Netherlands – N. van Welzenes;
Romania – Nicolae Saftoiu;
Spain – Enrique Torres (Enric);
Sweden – Sven O. Gripsborn;
United Kingdom – Arthur Thompson (Atom);

===== Specialized Professional Magazine =====
Italy – Galassia

===== Non-Specialized Professional Magazine =====
Belgium – Ciso – SF & Comics;
France – Le Magazine Litteraire: La Science-Fiction;
Italy – Fena rete: Fantascienza & Futuribile;
Netherlands – Stripschrift: SF & Comics;
Spain – Yorick: Teatro y Ciencia-Ficcion;

===== Fanzine =====
Austria – Quarber Merkur;
Belgium – Kosmos;
France – Nyarlathotep;
Hungary – SF Tajekoztato;
Italy – Notiziario CCSF;
Netherlands – Holland-SF;
Romania – Solaris;
Spain – Fundacion;
Sweden – SF Forum;
Turkey – Antares;

===== Comics =====
Belgium – Yoko Tsuno, R. Leloup;
Netherlands – Arman en Ilva, The Tjong King;
Spain – Haxtur, Victor de la Fuente;
Sweden – Blixt Gordon, Lars Olsson;

===== Essay, biography, bibliography =====
Hungary – A Fantazia Irodalma, Laszlo Urban;
Netherlands – 100 jaar SF in Nederland, Dick Scheepstra;
Romania – Virsta de Aur an Anticipatiei Romanesti, Ion Hobana;
Spain – La SF: Contramitologia del Siglo XX, Carlo Frabetti (Essay);
Ray Bradbury-Humanista del Futuro, Jose Luis Garci (Book);
Sweden – SF Articles in 'Sydsvenska Dagbladet', Sven Christer Swahn;

=== 1976 European SF Awards: Poznań, Poland ===
- Belgium – Jacques van Herp
- Bulgaria – Liuben Dilov
- Denmark – Jannick Storn
- France – Gerard Klein
- German Democratic Republic – Gerhardt Brandstner
- Hungary – Peter Zsoldos
- Italy – Karel Thole
- Norway – Peter Harris
- Poland – Czesław Chruszczewski
- Romania – Vladimir Colin
- Soviet Union – Yeremey Parnov
- Spain – Miguel Masriera
- Sweden – Roland Aldenberg
- United Kingdom – Brain W. Aldiss
- West Germany – Herbert W. Franke
- Yugoslavia – Ivan Lalic
- Netherlands – Bruna Publishing House
- Belgium – Ides et Autres (anthologies of translations)
- Czechoslovakia – Interpress Magazin

==== Special awards ====
- Lifelong Literary Achievement: Stanisław Lem (Poland)
- Artistic Achievement: Alexei Leonov (for his cosmic paintings)
- Special Award from the Jury: Mircea Opriţă (Romania) (special award of the jury)

=== 1978 European SF Awards: Brussels, Belgium ===
==== Science Fiction Awards ====
- Series: Ailleurs et demain Robert Laffont (France)
- Anthology: Planete socialiste Kesselring (Switzerland)
- Novel: Les hauteurs beantes Alexandru Zinoviev (Soviet Dissident)
- Collection: Low-Flying Aircraft J. G. Ballard (United Kingdom)
- Professional Magazine: Futurs (France)
- Semi-Professional Magazine: Orbit (Netherlands)
- Fanzine: Zikkurath (Spain)
- Essay: Le frontiere dell'ignoto Vittorio Curtoni (Italy)
- Cycle of Novels: La Saga de los Aznar George H. White (Spain)
- Artist: Chris Foss (United Kingdom)
- Comics: Mailis Claude Auclair (France)
- Film: The Man Who Fell to Earth by Nicolas Roeg (United Kingdom)
- Play: Sodomaquina Carlo Frabetti (Spain)
- Translator: Zoran Zivkovic (Yugoslavia)

==== Fantastic & Fantasy Award ====
- Publisher: Marabout (Belgium)
- Anthologists: Jacques Goimard & Roland Stragliati (France)
- Novel: The Forbidden Forest Mircea Eliade (Romania)
- Collection: Derrière le mur blanc Eddy C. Bertin (Belgium)
- Professional Magazine: Terzo Occhio (Italy)
- Semi-Professional Magazine: Cahiers Jean Ray (Belgium)
- Fanzine: Odyssée (Belgium)
- Essay: Un nouveau fantastique Jean Pierre Baronian (Belgium)
- Cycle of Novels: Bob Morane Henri Vernes (Belgium)
- Artist: Gaston Bogaert (Belgium)
- Comics: Il dono Roberto Bonadimani (Italy)
- Film Actor: Paul Naschy (Spain)
- Playwright: Sławomir Mrożek (Poland)
- Translator: Roberta Rambelli (Italy)

=== 1980 European SF Awards: Stresa, Italy ===
- Novel: The White Dragon Anne McCaffrey (United Kingdom); Babel Vladimir Colin (Romania)
- Story: Der Rote Kristallplanet Gerd Maximovic (West Germany); Evadarea lui Algemon Gheorghe Sasarman (Romania)
- Artist: Franco Storchi (Italy); Roger Dean (United Kingdom)
- Publisher: Editrice Nord (Italy); Krajowa Agencja Wydawnicza (KAW) (Poland)
- Fanzine: SF...ere (Italy); Omicron (Romania)
- Film: Scontri stellari oltre la terza dimensione (Starcrash) by Luigi Cozzi (Italy); Čovjek koga treba ubiti by Veljko Bulajić (Yugoslavia)
- Comics: Rosa di stelle Roberto Bonadimani (Italy); In lumea lui Harap Alb Sandu Florea (Romania)

==== Special awards ====
- Author: John Brunner (United Kingdom); Stanisław Lem (Poland)
- Artist: Karel Thole (Italy)
- Essay: 20.000 pagine alla ricerca di Jules Verne Ion Hobana (Romania); Lovecraft S. Fusco & G. de Turris (Italy)
- Fan: Waldemar Kumming (West Germany); Andrzej Pruszyński (Poland)
- Best Artwork Exhibited: Oliviero Berni (Italy)

=== 1982 European SF Awards: Mönchengladbach, West Germany ===
- Author: Arkady and Boris Strugatsky (Soviet Union); Jacques Sadoul (France); John Brunner (United Kingdom)
- Professional Magazine: Antares (France)
- Fanzine: Shards of Babel (Netherlands)
- Publisher: Heyne (West Germany); KAW (Poland)

=== 1983 European SF Awards: Ljubljana, Yugoslavia ===
- Author: Istvan Nemere (Hungary); Christopher Priest (United Kingdom)
- Professional Magazine: Fantastyka (Poland); Solaris (West Germany)
- Book: Ljudju, zvezde, vesolja – Bajt (Yugoslavia); Sdvig – Scherbakov (Soviet Union)
- Fanzine: Shards of Babel (Netherlands); Kvazar (Poland)
- Publisher: Tehniska Zalozba Slovenije (Yugoslavia); Galaktika (Bulgaria)

=== 1984 European SF Awards: Brighton, United Kingdom (SeaCon'84) ===
- Special Award: Science in SF Nicholls, Langford and Stableford (United Kingdom); Centre International pour documentation sur la literature de l'etrange (Belgium); Yeremey Parnov (Soviet Union)
- Novelist: John Brunner (United Kingdom); Gianluigi Zuddas (Italy); Janusz Zajdel (Poland)
- Short Story Writer: J. G. Ballard (United Kingdom); A. de Ceglie (Italy); Kir Bulychev (Soviet Union)
- Artist: D. Hardy (United Kingdom); G. Festino (Italy); R. Wojtyński (Poland)
- Publisher: Gollancz (United Kingdom); Fleuve Noir (France); Mir (Soviet Union)
- Professional Magazine: Foundation (United Kingdom); Fiction (France); Sirius (Yugoslavia)
- Fanzine: Epsilon (United Kingdom); Andromeda Nachrichten (West Germany); Helion (Romania)
- Screenwriter: Rainer Erler (West Germany); Chinghiz Aitmatov (Soviet Union)
- Film Director: Piotr Szulkin (Poland); Marcell Jankovics (Hungary)

=== 1986 European SF Awards: Zagreb, Yugoslavia (Ballcon) ===
- Special Award: Iskry (Poland); Solfanelli Editore (Italy)
- Magazine: Urania (Italy); Sirius (Yugoslavia); Fantastika (Poland); Galaktika (Hungary); Jules Verne Magazinet (Sweden); Zápisník (Czechoslovakia)
- Fanzine: La Spada Spezzata (Italy); Fikcje (Poland); Ikarie XB (Czechoslovakia)
- Publisher: Heyne Verlag (Germany); Gollancz (United Kingdom); Denoël (France); Alfa (Poland); Mora (Hungary); Fanucci (Italy)
- Editor: Wolfgang Jeschke (Germany); Jacques Sadoul (France); Peter Kuczka (Hungary); Sandro Pergameno (Italy); Adam Hollanek (Poland)
- Television: Bogdanoff
- Posthumous: Julia Verlanger; Janusz Zajdel

=== 1987 European SF Awards: Montpellier, France ===
==== Bulgaria ====
- Author: Liubomir Nikolov (for the novel Earthform in the Summerwind)
- Artist: Rumen Urumov

==== France ====
- Lifelong Literary Achievement: Michel Jeury
- Collection: Yves Fremion (for collection of stories Reves du sable, chateaux de sang
- Comic: Pierre Christin & Jean-Claude Mézières (for comics series Valerian)
- Series: Ailleurs et demain – Edited by Gerard Klein ("Robert Laffont")

==== German Democratic Republic ====
- Lichtjahr – almanac edited by Eric Simon

==== Hungary ====
- Author: Miklos Monus (for the novel He and It)
- Artist: Csaba Jancso (for graphic work)
- Publisher: Nepszava Publishing House
- Fanzine: Metamorphozis

==== Italy ====
- Author: Renato Pestriniero (for the novel Il nido al di la dell'ombra)
- Series: Cosmo Argento – Edited by Piergiorgio Nicolazzini ("Editrice Nord")
- Magazine: Dimensione Cosmica
- Translations: Annarita Guarnieri

==== Poland ====
- Lifelong Literary Achievement: Wiktor Żwikiewicz
- Publisher: Iskry Publishing House
- Fanzine: Feniks

==== Portugal ====
- Author: João Aniceto (for the novel O desafio)
- Essay: Alvaro de Sousa Holstein Ferreria & Joao Manuel Morais for their Bibliografia da Ficcão Científica e Fantasia Portuguesa
- Series: Contacto, edited by Joao Manuel Barreiros (Gradiva)

==== Romania ====
- Lifelong Literary Achievement: Victor Kembach
- Author: Cristian Tudor Popescu (for his short stories)
- Series: Fantastic Club, series ("Albatros")
- Anticipația almanac published by the magazine Știința și tehnica
- Fanzine: Paradox

==== Soviet Union ====
- Lifelong Literary Achievement: Arkady and Boris Strugatsky
- Author: Vitali Babenko (for his short stories)
- TV-Series: Cosmonaut Gherghi Gretchko, for the TV-series Fantastic World
- Publisher: Detskaia Literatura Publishing House
- Magazine: Prostor
- Translation: Maria Ossintseva

==== Spain ====
- Fanzine: Transito

=== 1989 European SF Awards: San Marino ===
==== Bulgaria ====
- Lifelong Literary Achievement: Vessella Lutzkanova
- Artist: Plamen Avramov
- Magazine: FEP ("Fantastika, Evristika, Prognostika")

==== Finland ====
- Author: Karl Nenonen
- Publisher: Ursa Publishing House
- Magazine: Portti

==== Hungary ====
- Lifelong Literary Achievement: Laszlo Lorincze
- Author: Hugo Preyer (for the novel Galaktikai jatekom)
- Artist: Ivan Marko
- Publisher: Vega Publishing House
- Magazine: Elixir

==== Italy ====
- Lifelong Literary Achievement: Lino Aldani
- Lifelong Artistic Achievement: Karel Thole
- Promoter: Ernesto Vegetti
- Publisher: Marino Solfanelli Publishing House
- Magazine: Urania

==== Poland ====
- Critic: Andrzej Niewiadowski
- Artist: Dariusz Chojnacki
- Publisher: Alfa Publishing House
- The editorial staff of the magazines Fantasyka, MalaFantasyka, Fantasyka Comics

==== Portugal ====
- Author: Romeu de Melo
- Publisher: Livros do Brasil (for Argonauta series)

==== Romania ====
- Lifelong Literary Achievement: Vladimir Colin
- Artist: Traian Abruda & Cornel Ionicelli
- Critic: Cornel Robu (for critical edition of Victor Anestin's work)
- Magazine: Romanian Review (for the issue dedicated to Romanian SF)
- Fanzine: Helion

==== Soviet Union ====
- Author & Screen Writer: Karen Shahnasarov
- Publisher: Sovetscaia Rossia Publishing House

==== Spain ====
- Author: Carlos Saiz Cidoncha
- Fanzine: Berserkr

==== Yugoslavia ====
- Artist: Igor Kordey
- Bibliography: Zivko Prodanovich (for his SF Bibliography in Braille)

=== 1990 European SF Awards: Fayence, France ===
==== Hall of Fame ====
- Best Author: Romulus Barbulescu & George Anania (Romania)
- Best Artist: Philippe Druillet (France)
- Best Publisher: Wiktor Bukato (Poland)
- Best Magazine: Ikarie (Czechoslovakia)
- Best Promoter: Boris Zavgorodni (Soviet Union)

==== Encouragement Awards ====
- Czechoslovakia: Martin Zhouf
- France: Bernard Simonay
- Hungary: Joszef Nemeth
- Romania: Mihail Gramescu
- Soviet Union: Lukin Couple

=== 1991 European SF Awards: Kraków, Poland (CraCon/PolCon) ===
==== Hall of Fame ====
- Best Author: Stanisław Lem (Poland)
- Best Artist: Kája Saudek (Czechoslovakia)
- Best Publisher: Unwin/Hyman (United Kingdom)
- Best Magazine: Interzone (United Kingdom)
- Best Promoter: Kees van Toorn (Netherlands)

==== Encouragement Awards ====
- Belgium – Johan Desseyn
- Bulgaria – Val Todorov
- Czechoslovakia – Vilma Kadlečková
- Germany – Maria J. Pfamnholz
- Italy – Daniele Vecchi
- Lithuania – Evaldas Livthevicius
- Netherlands – Paul Harland
- Romania – Alexandru Ungureanu (new writer)
- United Kingdom – Eric Brown
- Soviet Union – Andrei Lazarchuk
- Romania – Tudor Popa (new artist)

==== Special Achievement Award ====
- Piotr W. Cholewa and Piotr "Raku" Rak – acknowledging their work for international fandom

=== 1992 European SF Awards: Freudenstadt, Germany (FreuCon XII) ===
==== Hall of Fame ====
- Best Author: Arkady and Boris Strugatsky (Russia)
- Best Artist: Teodor Rotrekl (Czechoslovakia)
- Best Publisher: Wilhelm Heyne Verlag (Germany)
- Best Magazine: Foundation (United Kingdom)
- Best Promoter: Alexandre Hlinka & Vladimír Veverka (Czechoslovakia)

==== Encouragement Award ====
- Romania – Danut Ungureanu

=== 1993 European SF Awards: Saint Helier, Jersey (Helicon) ===
==== Hall of Fame ====
- Best Author: Iain Banks (United Kingdom)
- Best Artist: Jim Burns (United Kingdom)
- Best Publisher: Phantom Press International (Poland)
- Best Magazine: Anticipatia (Romania)
- Best Promoter: Larry van der Putte (Netherlands)

==== Spirit of Dedication Awards ====
- Best Fanzine: BEM (Spain)
- Best Work of Art: Gilles Francescano (France)

==== Encouragement Awards ====
- Belgium: Fons Boelanders
- France: Jean Pierre Planque
- Hungary: G. Nagy Pal
- Italy: Paolo Brera
- Norway: Cato Sture
- Poland: Radosław Dylis
- Russia: Vasily Zvygintsev
- Slovakia: Josef Zamay
- Spain: Paco Roca
- Ukraine: Ludmilla Kozinets
- United Kingdom: Sue Thomas

=== 1994 European SF Awards: Timișoara, Romania ===
==== Hall of Fame ====
- Best Author: Boris Shtern (Ukraine)
- Best Artist: Dimitre Iankov (Bulgaria)
- Best Publisher: Nemira (Romania) +
- Best Magazine: Jurnalul SF (Romania)
- Best Promoter: Cornel Secu (Romania)

==== Honorary Award ====
- Ivailo Runev (Bulgaria – post mortem)

==== Spirit of Dedication Awards ====
- Best Fanzine: The Science Fact & Science Fiction Concatenation; (United Kingdom)
- Best Performance: Adrian Budritzan's Laser Show (Romania)
- Best Work of Art: Tudor Popa (Romania)

==== Encouragement Awards ====
- Bulgaria: Christo Poshtakov (new author)
- Finland: Risto Isomaki (new author)
- United Kingdom: Jeff Noon (new author)
- Ukraine: Lev Vershenen (new author)
- Romania: Tudor Popa (new artist)

==== Special Prize ====
- Alexandru Mironov (Romania) – for his contribution to EuROCon '94

=== 1995 European SF Awards: Glasgow, Scotland (Intersection) ===
53rd World Science Fiction Convention Intersection; the event was also the 1995 Worldcon.

==== Hall of Fame ====
- Best Author: Alain le Bussy (Belgium)
- Best Artist: Juraj Maxon (Slovakia)
- Best Publisher: Babel Publications (Netherlands)
- Best Magazine: Andromeda Nachrichten (Germany)
- Best Promoter: Jaroslav Olša, Jr. (Czech Republic)

==== Encouragement Award ====
- Sebastian A. Corn (Romania)

=== 1996 European SF Awards: Vilnius, Lithuania (Lituanicon) ===
==== Hall of Fame ====
- Best Author: Andrzej Sapkowski (Poland)
- Best Artist: Denis Martynets (Ukraine)
- Best Publisher: Eridanas (Lithuania)
- Best Magazine: Alien Contact (Germany)
- Best Promoter: Gediminas Beresnevicius (Lithuania)
- Best Translator: Aleksander Scherbakov (Russia)

==== Spirit of Dedication Award ====
- Best Fanzine: SF-Journalen (Sweden – ed. Ahrvid Engholm)

==== Encouragement Awards ====
- Marian & Sergei Diachenko (Ukraine)
- George Ceausu (Romania)

==== Special Prize ====
- Igor Shaganov (Ukraine)

=== 2005: Glasgow, Scotland (Interaction) ===
Event celebrated the 63rd World Science Fiction Convention Interaction and was also that year's Worldcon.

=== 2010: Cieszyn, Poland and Český Těšín, Czech Republic (PolCon/ParCon) ===
The PolCon/ParCon combined event was organized jointly by Czech, Polish, and Slovak fandoms.

==== European Grand Master ====
- Andrzej Sapkowski (Poland)

==== Hall of Fame ====
- Best Author: Stephen Baxter – (UK)
- Best Translator: Piotr Cholewa (Poland)
- Best Promoter: Robert Zittnan (Slovakia)
- Best Magazine: SRSFF (Romania)
- Best Publisher: Newcon Press (UK)
- Best Artist: Martina Pilcerova (Slovakia)

==== Encouragement Awards ====
- Natalya Shcherba (Ukraine)
- Karina Shainyan (Russia)
- Tamás Csepregi (Hungary)
- Michal Ivan (Slovakia)
- Luciana Brîndusa Grosu (Romania)
- Maciej Guzek (Poland)
- Adrian Lazarovski (Bulgaria)

==== Spirit of Dedication Awards ====
- Artist: Lars Jakobson, Sweden
- Best Dramatic Presentation: Fredrik Edin, Martin Hultman, Stig Larsson & Tarik Saleh for Metropia, Sweden

=== 2011: Stockholm, Sweden (and Swecon) ===
Stockholm (Sweden)

==== European Grand Master ====
- Sam J. Lundwall (Sweden)

==== Hall of Fame ====
- Best Author: Alastair Reynolds (UK)
- Best Translator: Attila Németh (Hungary)
- Best Promoter: Louis Savy (UK), Oleg Kolesnikov (Russian Federation)
- Best Magazine: Ubiq (Croatia), Fantlab.ru (Russian Federation)
- Best Publisher: Lenizdat (Russian Federation)
- Best Artist: David A. Hardy (UK)

==== Encouragement Awards ====
- Jan Polacek (Czech Republic)
- Maria Ryapolova (Ukraine)
- Hannu Rajaniemi (Finland)
- Mariam Petrosyan (Armenia)
- Tim Skorenko (Belarus)
- Michal Jedinak (Slovakia)
- Ákos Kovács (Hungary)
- Stefana Czeller (Romania)
- Ivan Kuznetsov (Russia)

==== Spirit of Dedication Awards ====
- Best Artist: Ivan Mavrović (Croatia)
- Best Fanzine: Parsek (Croatia)
- Best Dramatic Presentation: Aniara (Sweden)

==== Honorary Awards ====
- Vlado Risa (Czech Republic)
- Svetlana Bondarenko (Ukraine)

=== 2012: Zagreb, Croatia ===
==== Hall of Fame ====
- Best Author: Ian McDonald (UK)
- Best Artist: Nela Dunato (Croatia)
- Best Translator: Pavel Weigel (Czech Republic)
- Best Promoter: SF Encyclopedia Online Team (UK)
- Best Publisher: Ailleurs et demain, Éditions Robert Laffont (France)
- Best Magazine: Galaxies SF (France)
- Best Dramatic Presentation: Divadelní Spolek Kašpar (Czech Republic), for its adaptation of Daniel Keyes’s novella Flowers for Algernon
- Best Website: Science Fact and Science Fiction Concatenation (UK)
- Best artist: Zdenko Bašić (Croatia)
- Best fanzine: Eridan (Croatia)

==== Honorary Award ====
- Jean Giraud aka Moebius (France)

==== Honorary Award – European Grand Master ====
- Brian Aldiss (UK)

==== Encouragement Awards ====
- Oleksandra Ruda (Ukraine)
- Katarina Brbora (Croatia)
- Istvan Marki (Hungary)
- Illy Tyo (Russia)
- Aleš Oblak (Slovenia)
- Oliviu Craznic (Romania)
- Rod Rees (UK)
- Lucia Droppova (Slovakia)
- Jan "Johnak" Kotouč (Czech Republic)

=== 2013: Kyiv, Ukraine ===
==== European Grand Master ====
- Terry Pratchett (UK)
- Iain Banks (UK)

==== Hall of Fame ====
- Best Author: Andrei Valentinov (Ukraine)
- Best Translator: Patrice and Viktoriya Lajoie (France)
- Best Promoter: Istvan Burger (Hungary)
- Best Magazine: SFX (UK)
- Best Publisher: Shiko (Ukraine)
- Best Artist: Nikolai Redka (Ukraine)

==== Encouragement Awards ====
- Stefan Cernohuby (Austria)
- Ioana Visan (Romania)
- Aleksandra Davydova (Russia)
- Leonid Kaganov (Russia)
- Livia Hlavackova (Slovakia)
- Boris Georgiev (Georgia)
- Julia Novakova (Czech Republic)
- Oleg Silin (Ukraine)
- Martin Vavpotic (Slovenia)
- Anton Lik (Belarus)

==== Spirit of Dedication Awards ====
- Best Artist: Katerina Bachilo (Russia)
- Best Fanzine: Fandango (Ukraine)
- Best Website: Europa SF Scifiportal (Romania)
- Best Dramatic Presentation: Vash Vikhod (Your Move), theater “Raido” (Ukraine)

Honorary Award

- Harry Harrison (in memoriam)
- Boris Strugatsky (in memoriam)

=== 2014: Dublin, Ireland ===
==== European Grand Master ====
- Jim Fitzpatrick – Ireland

==== Hall of Fame ====
- Best Author: Wolfgang Jeschke – Germany
- Best Artist: Jim Fitzpatrick – Ireland
- Best Publisher: Angry Robot – United Kingdom
- Best Magazine: Cosmoport – Belarus
- Best Translator: Ms. Kersti Juva – Finland
- Best Promoter of Science Fiction: Dave Lally – Ireland

==== Spirit of Dedication Awards ====
- Artist: Alexander Prodan – Ukraine
- Best Performance: Adaption of Dr. Horribles Sing-along Blog – Croatia
- Best SF Website: Geek Ireland – Ireland
- Best Fanzine: Darker – Russia
- Best creator of children's ScienceFiction or fantasy books (tie): Oisín McGann* – Ireland, :Vladimir Arenev* – Ukraine

==== Encouragement Awards ====
- Marco Rauch – Austria
- Victor Martinovich – Belarus
- Genoveva Detelinova – Bulgaria
- Irena Hartmann – Croatia
- Míla Linc – Czech Republic
- Anthea West – Ireland
- Robert M. Wegner – Poland
- Rui Alex – Portugal
- Eugen Cadaru – Romania
- Роман Шмараков/Roman Shmarakov – Russia
- Lenka Štiblaríková – Slovakia
- Igor Silivra – Ukraine

==== The National Irish Science Fiction Film Awards (The Golden Blasters) ====
The Golden Blasters are unconnected to the Eurocons and were presented because this event was combined with Ireland's own national convention.

===== Golden Blaster =====
- ON/OFF; directed by Thierry Lorenzi

===== Silver Blaster =====
- Steadfast Stanley; directed by John Kim

===== Best Script =====
- The Borders of the Imagination; written by Benjamin A. Friedman

===== Best Script Honorable Mentions =====
- Once a Hero by Neil Chase; and The Almost Dead by Stanley B. Eisenhammer

=== 2015: Saint Petersburg, Russia ===
These awards were announced on 26 April 2015 at the 37th Eurocon in St. Petersburg, Russia.

==== European Grand Master ====
- Eugene Lukin (Russia)

==== Hall of Fame ====
- Best Author: China Miéville (United Kingdom)
- Best Artist: Manchu (France)
- Best Magazine: Fantastica Almanac (Bulgaria)
- Best Publisher: Gollancz (United Kingdom)
- Best Promoter: Mihaela Marija Perković (Croatia)
- Best Translator: Ekaterina Dobrohotova-Majkova (Russia)

==== Spirit Of Dedication Awards ====
- Best Artist: Serhiy Krykun (Ukraine)
- Best Fanzine: Pritiazhenie(Attraction) (Russia)
- Best Website: Europa SF (Romania)
- Best Dramatic Presentation: Song of the Sea (Ireland)
- Best creator of children's ScienceFiction or fantasy books: (tie) Anton Lomaev (Russia), Ruth F Long (Ireland)

==== Envouragement Awards ====
- Micheal Wozoning – Austria
- Kaloyan Zahariev – Bulgaria
- David Kelecic – Croatia
- Martin D. Antonin – Czech Republic
- Liz Bourke – Ireland
- Luis Corredoura – Portugal
- Georgiana Vladulescu – Romania
- Victor Kolyuzhniak – Russia
- Jana Paluchová – Slovakia

=== 2016: Barcelona, Spain ===
These awards were announced on 6 November 2016 at the 38th Eurocon in Barcelona, Spain.

==== European Grand Master ====
- Herbert W. Franke (Austria)

Hall Of Fame

- Best Author: Tom Crosshill (Latvia)
- Best Artist: Stephan Martinière (France)
- Best Magazine: Bifrost (France)
- Best Publisher: Nova – Ediciones B (Spain)
- Best Promoter: (tie) James Bacon (Ireland), Roberto Quaglia (Italy), Organizers of Archipelacon (Finland & Sweden)
- Best Translator: Andrew Bromfield (United Kingdom)

==== Spirit Of Dedication AWARDS ====
- Best Author: Guillem López – (Spain)
- Best Artist: Kristina Bilota Toxicpanda (Croatia)
- Best Fanzine: SuperSonic (Spain)
- Best Website: Risingshadow (Finland)
- Best Dramatic Presentation: El Ministerio Del Tiempo/The Ministry of Time (Spain), The Shaman (Austria)
- Best creator of children's Science Fiction or fantasy books: Sofia Rhei (Spain)

==== Encouragement Awards ====
- Orshulya Farynyak – Ukraine
- Felicidad Martínez – Spain
- Mark E. Pocha – Slovakia
- Alexandru Lamba – Romania
- Jan Hlávka and Jana Vybíralová- Czech Republic
- Maria Gyuzeleva – Bulgaria
- Kuschuj Nepoma/Кусчуй Непома – Russia
- Rui Ramos- Portugal
- Melanie Vogeltanz – Austria
- Juraj Belošević – Croatia
- Maria Boyle- Ireland

=== 2017: Dortmund, Germany ===
These awards were announced on 17 June 2017 at the 39th Eurocon in Dortmund, Germany.

==== European Grand Master ====
- Zoran Živković (Serbia)

==== Hall of Fame ====
- Best Author: Dario Tonani (Italy)
- Best Artist: (tie) Aurélien Police (France), Judith Clute (United Kingdom)
- Best Magazine: Supersonic (Spain)
- Best Publisher: Tracus Arte (Romania)
- Best Promoter: Ian Watson (United Kingdom)
- Best Translator: Natalia Osoianu / Наталия Осояну (Russia)

==== The Achievement Awards ====
- Best Work of Fiction: The Call – Peadar O’Guilin (Ireland)
- Best Work of Art: Cover of the Book ”The 1000 Year Reich”, Juan Miguel Aguilera (Spain)
- Best Fanzine: CounterClock (Sweden)
- Best Internet Publication, other than a fanzine: Diezukunft.de (Germany)
- Best Dramatic Presentation: Boy 7 (Germany)
- Best work for Children: Chasodei – Natalia Sherba (Ukraine)

==== The Chrysalis Awards ====
- Alexander Tsonkov – Lostov Bulgaria
- Aliaksei Shein – Belarus
- David Luna – Spain
- Doina Roman – Romania
- Emanuela Valentini – Italy
- Hanuš Sainer – Czech Republic
- K.A. Terina / K.А. Терина-Russia
- Miro Švercel – Slovakia
- Natalia Savchuk – Ukraine
- Romain Lucazeau – France
- Sarah Maria Griffin – Ireland

=== 2018: Amiens, France ===
Eurocon 2018 was hosted by Nemo 2018 from Thursday 19 to Sunday 22 July 2018. There was a stream of programming on African Science Fiction.

==== Hall of Fame ====
- Best Author: Анна Старобинец/Anna Starobinets (Russia)
- Best Artist: Milivoj Ćeran (Croatia)
- Best Magazine: Angle mort / Blindspot (France)
- Best Publisher: Zhupansky (Ukraine)
- Best Promoter: Jukka Halme (Finland)
- Best Translator: Ylva Spångberg (Sweden)

==== The CHRYSALIS AWARDS ====
- Maksim Kutuzau (Belarus)
- Věra Mertlíková (Czech Republic)
- Nicolas Sarter (France)
- Sinéad O’Heart (Ireland)
- Daniel Timariu (Romania)
- Martin Hatala (Slovakia)
- Yaryna Katorozh (Ukraine)

==== Achievement Awards ====
- Best Work of Fiction: The House of Binding Thorns, by Aliette de Bodard (France)
- Best Work of Art: Cover of ”Junkerś i Vaililiant protiv sila tome, by Sebastijan Čamagajevac (Croatia)
- Best Fanzine: Journey Planet, issue 33 (Ireland)
- Best Internet Publication, other than a fanzine: nooSFere (France)
- Best Dramatic Presentation: Valerian and the City of a Thousand Planets (France)
- Best Work for Children, tie: Das Sagenbuch zum Stephansdom, by Barbara Schinko (Austria) / Moj brat živi u kompjuteru, by Branka Primorac (Croatia)

==== HONORARY AWARD European Grand Master: ====
- Gerard Klein (France)

=== 2019: Belfast, Northern Ireland ===
Eurocon 2019 was hosted by TitanCon Belfast from Thursday 22 to Saturday 24 August 2019. This was the weekend after Worldcon in Dublin.

==== European Grand Master ====
- Ian McDonald (United Kingdom)

==== Hall of Fame Awards ====
- Best Author: Charles Stross (United Kingdom)
- Best Artist: Nicolas Fructus (France)
- Best Magazine: Windumanoth (Spain)
- Best Publisher: Future Fiction (Italy)
- Best Promoter: Petra Bulić (Croatia)
- Best Translator: Mihai-Dan Pavelescu (Romania)

==== Achievement Awards ====
- Best Work of Fiction: Spire Trilogy, Laurent Génefort (France)
- Best Work of Art: Covers and interior illustrations for Le Dogue Noir, American Gods, and Le Monarque de la Vallée, Daniel Egneus (Sweden)
- Best Fanzine: Find a Lumberjack (Russia)
- Best Work for Children: Begone the Raggedy Witches, Celine Kiernan (Ireland)
- Best Internet Publication, Other than a Fanzine: Origen Cuántico (Spain)
- Best Dramatic Presentation: Game of Thrones (Romania)

==== The Chrysalis Awards ====
- Dalen Belić (Croatia)
- Franci Conforti (Italy)
- Sarah Davis Goff (Ireland)
- Mar Goizueta (Spain)
- Gunilla Jonsson & Michael Petersén (Sweden)
- Andrey Kokoulin / Андрей Кокоулин (Russia)
- Floriane Soulas (France)
- Svitlana Taratorina (Ukraine)

=== 2020: Rijeka, Croatia ===
Eurocon 2020 was hosted by Rikon from Friday 2 to Sunday 4 October 2020. Due to the global COVID-19 pandemic, the event program was recorded in the studio in Rijeka, and broadcast live over the Internet for all registered participants. ač.

==== European Grandmaster ====
- Franz Rottensteiner, Austria

==== Hall of Fame ====
- Best Artist: Sergey Shikin / Сергей Шикин (Russia)
- Best Author: Milena Benini (Croatia)
- Best Publisher: L’Atalante (France)
- Best Promoter: Cristina Jurado (Spain)
- Best Magazine: Esensja (Poland)
- Best Translator: Pilar Ramírez Tello (Spain)

==== Achievement Awards ====
- Best Work of Art: The Dublin 2019 Hugo Award bases (Ireland)
- Best Written Work of Fiction: Luna: Moon Rising (Luna #3) by Ian McDonald (United Kingdom)
- Best Dramatic Presentation: Good Omens (United Kingdom)
- Best Fanzine: Journey Planet – A Half Pint of Flann (Ireland)
- Best Work for Children: The Invasion by Peadar Ó Guilín (Ireland)
- Best Internet Publication (tie): The Irish Fandom Community Group on Facebook (Ireland), Fantascientificast (Italy)

==== Chrysalis Awards ====
- Caroline Hofstätter (Austria)
- Zoe Penn (Croatia)
- Edmund Schluessel (Finland)
- Chloé Veillard (France)
- Oein DeBhairduin (Ireland)
- Linda De Santi (Italy)
- Jean Bürlesk (Luxembourg)
- Diana Alzner (Romania)
- Olga Rejn / Ольга Рэйн (Russia)
- Haizea Zubieta (Spain)

=== 2021: Fiuggi, Italy ===
Eurocon 2021 was hosted in Italy by DeepCon from Thursday 15 July to Sunday 18 July 2021.

==== European Grandmaster ====
- Maurizio Manziere, Italy

==== Hall of Fame ====
- Best Artist: Igor Baranko / Ігор Баранько (Ukraine)
- Best Author: Victor Pelevin / Виктор Пелевин (Russia)
- Best Publisher (tie): Azbooka / Азбука (Russia), Colibri Publishers / Колибри (Bulgaria), Shtriga (Croatia)
- Best Promoter: Vanja Kranjčević (Croatia)
- Best Magazine(tie): Mir Fantastiki (Russia), Helion (Romania)
- Best Translator: Serhiy Legeza (Ukraine)

==== Achievement Awards ====
- Best Work of Art: Vaderetro for the cover of L’Héliotrope (France)
- Best Written Work of Fiction: Baśń o wężowym sercu albo wtóre słowo o Jakóbie Szeli by Radek Rak (Poland)
- Best Dramatic Presentation: Russian Cyberpunk Farm / Русская кибердеревня
- Best Fanzine: Galaxy 42 #4 (Romania)
- Best Work for Children: An Adventure in the Lower Earth: Christmas Carolers vs Hallus Beasts, Elena Pavlova (Bulgaria)
- Best Internet Publication: Decameron 2020, priče iz karantene (Croatia)

==== Chrysalis Awards ====
- Romina Braggion (Italy)
- Helen Corcoran (Ireland)
- Sara Engström (Sweden)
- Mikhail Kovba / Михаил Ковба (Russia)
- Irena Parvanova (Bulgaria)
- Chiara Pumper (Croatia)
- Dragić Rabrenović (Montenegro)
- Jean-Michel Ré (France)
- Bianca Sol (Romania)
- Vlad Sord (Ukraine)
- Cosimo Suglia (Luxembourg)
- Anna Zabini (Austria)

=== 2022: Dudelange, Luxembourg ===
Eurocon 2022 was hosted by Luxcon from Thursday-Sunday 7–10 April 2022 (inclusive) in Dudelange, Luxembourg.

==== European Grandmaster ====
- Maurizio Manzieri, Italy

==== Hall of Fame ====
- Best Artist (tie): Igor Kordej (Croatia), Roch Urbaniak (Poland)
- Best Author: Francesco Verso (Italy)
- Best Publisher (tie): Copernicus Corporation (Poland), Hangar 7 (Croatia)
- Best Promoter: Yuri Shevela (Ukraine)
- Best Magazine: Sci Phi Journal – A Universe of Wonder (Belgium)
- Best Translator: Jack Fennell (Ireland)

==== Achievement Awards ====
- Best Work of Art: Cover art by Sparth, for La Dernière Emperox by John Scalzi (France)
- Best Written Work of Fiction: Futurespotting by Francesco Verso (Italy)
- Best Dramatic Presentation: Will Sliney's Storytellers by Will Sliney (Ireland)
- Best Fanzine: Présences d’esprit 105 (France)
- Best Work for Children: Świat Lema (The world of Lem) by Marta Ignerska (Poland)
- Best Internet Publication: The National Leprechaun Museum Talking Stories podcast (Ireland)

==== Chrysalis Awards ====
- Eleanor Bardilac (Austria)
- Victoria Beshliiska (Bulgaria)
- Stefan Dahlström (Sweden)
- Pavlo Derevianko (Ukraine)
- Ragim Dzhafarov / Рагим Джафаров (Russia)
- Elle McNicoll (United Kingdom)
- Josh O’Caoimh (Ireland)
- Saul Pandelakis (France)
- Ligia Pârvulescu (Romania)
- Maxime Weber (Luxembourg)

=== 2023: Uppsala, Sweden ===
Eurocon 2023 was known as Konflikt and was hosted from 8–11 June 2023 in Uppsala, Sweden.

==== European Grandmaster ====
- John-Henri Holmberg, Sweden

==== Hall of Fame ====
- Best Artist: Jesper Ejsing (Denmark)
- Best Author: Jacek Dukaj (Poland)
- Best Publisher: Science Fiction Cirklen (Denmark)
- Best Promoter: Flora Staglianò (Italy/Ukraine)
- Best Magazine: Future Fiction Magazine (Germany)
- Best Translator: Sebastian Musielak (Poland)

==== Achievement Awards ====
- Best Work of Art: Cover art for Bio Jednom Jedan Punk by Katarina Šumski (Croatia)
- Best Written Work of Fiction: Grim by Sara Bergmark Elfgren (Sweden)
- Best Dramatic Presentation: Maksym Osa (Ukraine)
- Best Fanzine: Himmelskibet, 63 (Denmark)
- Best Work for Children: Poe la nocchiera del tempo by Licia Troisi (Italy)
- Best Internet Publication: History of Ukrainian SF&F (Ukraine)

==== Chrysalis Awards ====
- Anouck Faure (France)
- Lea Katarina Gobec (Croatia)
- Łukasz Kucharczyk (Poland)
- Myriam M. Lejardi (Spain)
- Natalia Matolinets/Наталія Матолінець (Ukraine)
- Jacqueline Mayerhofer (Austria)
- Aiki Mira (Germany)
- Laura Silvestri (Italy)
- Derek Ugochukwu (Ireland)

=== 2024: Rotterdam, Netherlands ===
Eurocon 2024 was Erasmuscon in Rotterdam, Netherlands between 16 and 19 August 2024.

==== European Grandmaster ====
- Ian Watson (UK)

==== Hall of Fame Awards ====
- Best Author: Adrian Tchaikovsky (UK)
- Best Artist: Iris Compiet (Netherlands)
- Best Magazine: Phantastisch! (Germany)
- Best Publisher: Wydawnictwo IX (Poland)
- Best Promoter: Brian Nisbet (Ireland)
- Best Translator: Anna Gustafsson Chen (Sweden)

==== Achievement Awards ====
- Best Written Work of Fiction: Hopeland, Ian McDonald (Ireland)
- Best Work of Art: Cover art for Slavic Supernatural by Antonio Filipović (Croatia)
- Best Fanzine: (tie): Aner Welten, Solarpunk special issue (Luxembourg), SF Forum 141 (Sweden)
- Best Work for Children: How to Bring the Bees Back?, Maya Bocheva (Bulgaria)
- Best Internet Publication: Landing Zone Glasgow: The Glasgow 2024 Worldcon Blog (UK)
- Best Dramatic Presentation: The Sorcery School: A Fantasy Musical (Bulgaria)

==== The Chrysalis Awards ====
- Finn Audenaert (Belgium)
- Lucio Besana (Italy)
- Marie Erikson (Germany)
- Ivana Geček (Croatia)
- Elitsa Hristova (Bulgaria)
- Marguerite Imbert (France)
- Nacho Iribarnegaray (Spain)
- Zuzana Johanovská (Czech Republic)
- Audrey Martin (Luxembourg)
- Ralph Alexander Neumüller (Austria)
- Сергій Пильтяй/Serhii Pyltiai (Ukraine)
- Courtney Smyth (Ireland)

=== 2025: Mariehamn, Finland ===
Eurocon 2025 was Archipelacon 2 in Mariehamn, the Åland Islands, Finland between June 26–29, 2025.

==== European Grandmaster ====
- Joëlle Wintrebert (France)

==== Hall of Fame Awards ====
- Best Author: Aliette de Bodard (France)
- Best Artist: Johan Egerkrans (Sweden)
- Best Magazine: Queer*Welten (Germany)
- Best Publisher: Artline Studios (Bulgaria)
- Best Promoter: Ivan Kranjčević (Croatia)
- Best Translator (tie): Mladen Martić (Croatia), Elena Pavlova (Bulgaria)

==== Achievement Awards ====
- Best Written Work of Fiction: Long Live Evil, Sarah Rees Brennan (Ireland)
- Best Work of Art: Anubis series by Joanna Karpowicz (Poland)
- Best Fanzine (tie): Brev från Cosmos 15 (Sweden), Parsek 146 (Croatia), Potencjalny Mimik 4 (Poland)
- Best Work for Children: The Slug and the Snail, Oein DeBhairduin (Ireland)
- Best Internet Publication: UAGeek (Ukraine)
- Best Dramatic Presentation (tie): The Children of Sudra (Bulgaria), Flow (Latvia, nominated by Germany & Estonia)

==== The Chrysalis Awards ====
- Hypathie Aswang (France)
- Antea Benzon (Croatia)
- Kathryn Di (Bulgaria)
- Gabi Gabrinov (Romania)
- Justyna Hankus (Poland)
- Shauna Lawless (Ireland)
- Катерина Пекур/Kateryna Pekur (Ukraine)
- Lena Richter (Germany)
- Robin Rozendal (Netherlands)

== Notes ==
- 1985: There is info that 1985 Eurocon was to be held in Riga, Latvian SSR, Soviet Union, but was canceled.
- 1992: Was to have been Zagreb, but war in Croatia required a change of venue.
- 1998: There was no Eurocon this year, although there was a Euroconference in Croatia.
