= DeepCon =

Science fiction convention series held in Italy

DeepCon 26
- Status: Active
- Genre: Science fiction / Fantasy / Horror conventions
- Begins: 7 May 2026
- Ends: 10 May 2026
- Frequency: Annually
- Venue: Ambasciatori Place Hotel
- Locations: Fiuggi Fonte, FR
- Coordinates: 41.7938°N 13.2192°E
- Country: Italy
- Inaugurated: March 2000
- Most recent: 22 May 2025
- Previous event: DeepCon 25
- Next event: DeepCon 27
- Major events: panels; art exhibitions; dealers' room; mingling; EatCon; gala dinner; costume contest; autograph signing sessions
- Organiser: Deep Space One
- Website: deepcon.it

DeepCon (also Deepcon) is an Italian science fiction, fantasy and horror fan convention, covering multiple (ideally all) entertainment forms and media (e.g.: film, television, literature, comics, music, computer), mixed with a dose of actual, real-world science.

== History ==
The last two decades of the twentieth century were a relatively difficult time for science fiction in Italy, regardless of medium. Thus DeepCon was conceived to promote its visibility and viability as a genre, as well as a general SF fan convention.

Collaborations were sought with television stations, distributors and authoring firms, both for promotion and for panels explaining the behind-the-scenes work needed in order to air or sell a TV show or a movie. By the same token, TV and film actors and crew were present at all of the past DeepCons: actors, make-up artists, pre-production and post-production crew, scriptwriters, and so on.

Literature was not neglected, either. For several years, the convention's organizing committee was entrusted by WorldSF Italia with running Italcon (a convention for professionals) within DeepCon. Since then, publishers, translators, international artists and writers participate and roam the venue.

As a highlight, parent Italian fan club Deep Space One was awarded for 2009 by European Science Fiction Society the privilege of organizing Eurocon (a Europe-level convention), with guests from all over the continent.

By that time, the SF focus of the convention had already broadened to include fantasy and horror as well.

Since most attendees and even some guests had a strong interest in actual science, efforts were made to officially include scientific and quasi-scientific topics in the program: aeronautics, astronautics, astronomy, astrophysics, computer science, archaeology, the paranormal (both for and against). Members of ASI, NASA, Northrop, CICAP were guests multiple times.

Deepcon 21, originally planned for March 2020, had to be delayed, then canceled in compliance with nation-wide countermeasures against COVID-19. It was then rescheduled as DeepCon 21 + Eurocon 2021 + Italcon 47 for July 2021.

== Typical features ==
- Entertainment-related panels
- Real world-related panels
- Art exhibitions
- Dealers' room
- Mingling all convention long, often with the guests, too
- Charity auction
- EatCon (food- and drink-related attendee-driven sub-event)
- Gala dinner
- Costume contest
- Autograph signing sessions
- Sunbathing
- Spa (charged separately)
- Unplanned, impromptu extras

== Editions ==
Edition	Starting date	Announced guests
DeepCon 1	March 2000	Ed Bishop
DeepCon 2	8 March 2001	Andrew J. Robinson; Lolita Fatjo; Stephen Furst; C. Ian Russo; Gianluca Masi; Gabriella Cordone; Gianfranco Viviani; Marco Della Corte; Fabiana Redivo
DeepCon 3 + Italcon 28	7 March 2002	Anne McCaffrey; Harry Harrison; Max Grodénchik; Lolita Fatjo; Peter Williams; Natalie Wood
DeepCon 4	6 March 2003	Tim Russ; Chase Masterson; Ed Bishop; Michael Billington; Natalie Wood; Lolita Fatjo; Eric A. Stillwell; Giuseppe Lippi; Silvio Sosio; Lanfranco Fabriani; Elisabetta Vernier; Carlo Recagno; Suzanne Fuentes; Franco Mallia; Mario Di Sora; Tino Franco
DeepCon 5 + Italcon 30 + Xenacon 1	11 March 2004	Ian Watson; Ethan Phillips; Paris Jefferson; Lolita Fatjo; Angelica Tintori; Alessandro Vietti; Giuseppe Prosperini; Bruno Pulcinelli; Suzanne Fuentes
DeepCon 6 + Italcon 31	17 March 2005	Roberto Vacca; Umberto Guidoni; Carlo Cosolo; Lolita Fatjo; Janet Nemecek; Larry Nemecek; Joseph Nassise; Jeremy Bulloch; Garrett Wang; Paolo De Crescenzo; Emiliano Santalucia; Francesco Rea; Gabriele Catanzaro; Gianluca Masi
DeepCon 7 + Italcon 32	23 March 2006	Ugo Malaguti; Walter Piperno; Andrea Salsi; Carlo Cosolo; Corrado Giustozzi; Paolo Attivissimo; Gianfranco Casano; C. Ian Russo; Carlo Recagno; Andrea Ward; Valerio Evangelisti; Bernardo Lanzetti; Chelsea Quinn Yarbro; Lolita Fatjo; Alexander Siddig; Anthony Simcoe; Patricia Tallman; Jeffrey Willerth; Gerald Home
DeepCon 8 + Italcon 33	22 March 2007	Connor Trinneer; Peter Jurasik; Virginia Hey; Lolita Fatjo; Eric A. Stillwell; Richard K. Morgan; Mauro Antonio Miglieruolo; Andrea Salsi; Alessandro Vietti
DeepCon 9 + Italcon 34	13 March 2008	Vittorio Catani; Walter Piperno; Vittorio Cotronei; Lolita Fatjo; Mira Furlan; Suzie Plakson; Ruth Nestvold; Fabrizio Pucci; Beatrice Margiotti
DeepCon 10 + Eurocon 2009 + Italcon 35	26 March 2009	Giuseppe Lippi; Lolita Fatjo; Marina Sirtis; Anthony Simcoe; Max Grodénchik; Larry Nemecek; Janet Nemecek; Ian Watson; Sergey Lukyanenko; Bruce Sterling; Geoffrey Landis; Mary Turzillo
DeepCon 11 + Italcon 36	15 April 2010	Alfredo Castelli; Lolita Fatjo; Claudia Christian; André Bormanis; Robert Picardo; Diane Duane; Peter Morwood
DeepCon 12	14 April 2011	Robin Curtis; Lanfranco Fabriani; Lolita Fatjo
DeepCon 13	22 March 2012	Giuseppe Lippi; Bruce Boxleitner; David Nykl; Giulio Leoni; Peter Morwood; Diane Duane; Lolita Fatjo
DeepCon 14	14 March 2013	Nana Visitor; Paul McAuley; Maurizio Manzieri
DeepCon 15	27 March 2014	Emiliano Longobardi; Dominic Keating; Ian McDonald; Keiran McGreevy; John Couch; Lolita Fatjo
DeepCon 16	19 March 2015	Giuseppe Festino; Kate Vernon; Stefano Dubay; Umberto Guidoni; Lolita Fatjo
DeepCon 17	17 March 2016	Walter Koenig; Ken MacLeod; Lolita Fatjo
DeepCon 18	6 April 2017	Peter Williams; Lavie Tidhar; Giuseppe Lippi; Eric A. Stillwell; Lolita Fatjo; Giampietro Casasanta; Marco Casolino
DeepCon 19	19 April 2018	Ira Steven Behr; David Zappone; Charles Stross; Rick Larson; Claude Lalumière; Lolita Fatjo; Hanne Madeleine Paine; Emiliano Longobardi; Dany & Dany
DeepCon 20	21 March 2019	Nicole de Boer; Clelia Farris; Francesco Verso; Frank Ma; Mario Giorgioni; Lolita Fatjo
DeepCon 21 + Eurocon 2021 + Italcon 47	15 July 2021	Chase Masterson; Ian McDonald; Marco Casolino; Giuliano Giuffrida; Shun Iwasawa; Eric A. Stillwell; Maurizio Manzieri; Licia Troisi; Hanne Madeleine Paine
DeepCon 22	24 March 2022	David Nykl; Lolita Fatjo; Licia Troisi; Garrett Wang; Francesco Verso; Eric A. Stillwell; Giuliano Giuffrida; Original Boardgames
DeepCon 23	16 March 2023	Gary Jones; Robert O'Reilly; Marco Casolino; Gianfranco de Turris
DeepCon 24	14 March 2024	Brian Muir; Fabiana Redivo; Loredana Atzei; Antonio Porcu; Nicola Marco Camedda; Original Boardgames
DeepCon 25	22 May 2025	Dan Curry, VES Fellow; Lina Foti; Claude Francis Dozière; Loredana Atzei; Nicola Marco Camedda
DeepCon 26	7 May 2026	Casey Biggs; Ken MacLeod; Eric A. Stillwell; Antonio Porcu; Pierpaolo Pasquini; Gabriele Giglioli
