= Roberto Quaglia =

Italian science fiction writer (born 1962)

- Born: 17 May 1962 (age 64); Genoa, Italy
- Occupations: Science fiction writer; blogger
- Years active: 1989–present
- Height: 1.83 m (6 ft 0 in)
- Website: www.robertoquaglia.com

Roberto Quaglia (born 17 May 1962) is an Italian science fiction writer. Many of his works have been translated and published in Romania, and some have also been translated into English, Russian, Spanish, French, Japanese, Czech, Hungarian and Dutch.

== Life and career ==
Quaglia has held a variety of jobs, among them photographer, owner and barman of a pub, internet entrepreneur and politician. From the beginning of 1995 to the end of 1997, he was a Councilor in Genoa. Since 1989, he has been active in science fiction fandom. He has over a number of years occasionally written articles for the Science Fact & Science Fiction Concatenation, the SF zine that has won the most Eurocon Awards. Between 2002 and 2013 was vice-chairman of the European Science Fiction Society, the organization which coordinates the annual Eurocon science fiction convention.

In 1994 he became friends with American science fiction writer Robert Sheckley. In 1999, he and Sheckley traveled together around Europe for over a month, the first of a number of long journeys they took together. Some of Quaglia's articles, videos and photographs of these trips can be found on the Internet. In 2004, Quaglia and Sheckley began planning to write two books together, a project which became public a few months before Sheckley's death, in an article published by the Ukrainian press during Sheckley's last journey, a tour of Ukraine together with Quaglia. Sheckley's death put an end to this project.

In 2003, Quaglia and British writer Ian Watson met and became friends, which led to a literary collaboration. Together they wrote the collection of My Beloved stories, some of which are available on the Internet, having been published by Helix SF, Flurb and in the United States, Clarkesworld Magazine. Other stories have been published in the American magazine Weird Tales, the Canadian anthology Lust for Life, New Writings in the Fantastic, several Mammoth Books of Best New Erotica: Volume 7, Volume 9 and Best of Best New Erotica, and in other books. In 2009, these stories were collected into an anthology, The Beloved of My Beloved, published by NewCon Press, and launched in March–April 2009 at the Eurocon in Fiuggi and the Eastercon in Bradford.

Since the mid-2010s, Quaglia has been a guest on podcasts as a cultural and geopolitical commentator, participating in several hundred broadcasts across various Italian channels (the main ones being PandoraTV, ControTV, Byoblu, VisioneTV, Casadelsole, Telecolor, and Il Vaso di Pandora). He has also created content for Giulietto Chiesa’s PandoraTV channel, with whom he collaborated extensively. An archive of all these appearances has been compiled on his YouTube and Telegram channels.

Popularity in Russia: In November 2024, he was the only Italian guest at the first international symposium on the future held in Moscow, invited to speak at the opening plenary session. In June 2025, he was invited to speak about future professions at the St. Petersburg International Economic Forum (SPIEF). A 30-minute interview of his aired on 4 July 2025, on the Russian state Channel One in the program Samoe Vremya.

== Awards and honors ==
- 2009 – Eurocon ESFS Award for Best European Writer
- 2010 – BSFA Award for best short story for "The Beloved Time of Their Life"
- 2011 – Seiun Award – nomination for best SF/F work published in Japan (The Beloved Time of Their Lives)
- 2016 – Eurocon ESFS Award for Best European Promoter

== Works ==
Novels

- 1994: (in Romanian) Vagabondul interspaţial ("The Vagabond of Ether"). ro:Nemira. OCLC 895618848
- 2002: Bread, Butter and Paradoxine. Solid. ISBN 978-88-7360-015-2
- 2009: Paradoxine: The Adventures of James Vagabond (revised edition of Bread, Butter and Paradoxine). Immanion Press. ISBN 1-904853-67-6, ISBN 978-1-904853-67-1
- 2011: Jonathan Livingshit Pigeon: A Tail of Transcendence. Eagle Publishing House. ISBN 978-6069268865

Other fiction

- 1992: Somebody up there is lusting for me – science fiction play (distributed as a free gift to all attenders of Eurocon 1993 in Jersey)
- 1998: (in Romanian) God Ltd (Italian: "Dio S.r.l.") – short stories collection, Nemira.
- 2009: with Ian Watson: The Beloved of My Beloved – short stories collection, NewconPress. ISBN 978-0-9555791-8-9 (hardcover), ISBN 978-0-9555791-9-6 (paperback), re-published as an ebook in 2011 by Gollancz, ISBN 978-0-575114845

Non-fiction

- 1995: The future of science fiction – essay (in the official Souvenir Book of Intersection, the 53rd World Science Fiction Convention, Glasgow)
- 2003: (in Italian) Pensiero stocastico ("Stochastic Thought") – essay collection it: Delos Books
  - 2004: (in Romanian) Gandirea Stocastica ro: Nemira
- 2003: (in Italian) "Tutto quello che avreste sempre voluto sapere sull'11 settembre 2001, ma che non avete mai osato chiedervi" ("Everything you wanted to know about September 11, but have never dared to ask yourself") – essay, in Tutto quello che sai è falso. Manuale dei segreti e delle bugie. NuoviMondiMedia. ISBN 978-88-89091-50-0 (Italian edition of Everything You Know Is Wrong Russ Kick, ed.)
- 2006: (in Italian) Il Mito dell'11 Settembre e l'Opzione Dottor Stranamore ("The September 11th Myth and the Doctor Strangelove Option"). PonSinMor. ISBN 978-88-902775-1-1
  - 2009: (in Romanian) 11 Septembrie, Mitul. Editura Stefan. ISBN 978-973-118-120-2
  - 2011: The Myth of 11 September: The Satanic Verses of Western Democracy. Eagle Publishing House. ISBN 978-6068315171
- 2011: Avatar: The New Fantastic Horizons of Oneiric Justice – essay (in No.267 of Vector, the critical journal of the British Science Fiction Association)
