= Jo Zebedee =

Northern Irish science fiction and fantasy writer

- Born: 1971 (age 54–55)
- Occupation: Novelist
- Writing career
- Genres: Science fiction; Fantasy

Jo Zebedee (born 1971), is a Northern Irish science fiction and fantasy writer, based in Carrickfergus near Belfast.

She is considered one of Ireland's top Science fiction and fantasy writers. Her novels are often set in Northern Ireland.

Zebedee attended Victoria Primary School and Carrickfergus Grammar School before completing a degree in English Literature. She has been chairperson for Women Aloud NI. She has taught at Stranmillis College and for the Crescent Arts Centre where she runs creative writing classes. She is also a mentor with the Irish Writers' Centre. Zebedee was a guest of the Belfast Book festival and the C. S. Lewis festival. She was a guest for Titancon, the main Northern Ireland convention, and chair for the event in 2020. She's also been a guest of Octocon, Ireland's national convention. Zebedee also works for her own management consultancy.

Zebedee founded OtherworldsNI, a group for speculative fiction writers.

In 2024, she was awarded Arts Council Funding; she plans to write a sequel to Irish Carraig.

== Bookshop ==
Zebedee and her husband run a bookshop in Carrickfergus. In March 2024, the shop won the British Book Award for Independent Bookshop of the Year for the Island of Ireland.

== Bibliography ==
Inheritance Trilogy

- Abendau's Heir (2015)
- Sunset Over Abendau (2016)
- Abendau's Legacy (2016)

Novels

- Inish Carraig (2015)
- Waters and the Wild (2017)
- The Wildest Hunt (2021)
- Into a Blood-Red sky (2022)

Anthology

- Flash! (2018)

Contributor

- Ghosts in the Glass & Other Stories (Belfast Writers' Group Book #1) (2012) with Lynda Collins), Philip Henry and M. Rush
- Creatures & Curiosities (Belfast Writers' Group Book #2) (2017) with Lynda Collins, Kerry Buchanan, James Samuel McKay, Holly Ferres, Christopher Cousins, David Doherty-Jebb, Ellie Rose McKee, Kevin Connolly, Valerie Christie, Erin Burnett, M. Rush and Cathy Reilly
- The Last City (2018) with Robert M. Campbell, Juliana Spink Mills and Nathan Hystad
- Habworld 2420: TOME (2019) with Scott Jackson and Turlough Lavery
- Distaff: A Science Fiction Anthology by female authors (2019) with Rosie Oliver, Sam Primeau and Jane O’Reilly
- Femmes-Fae Tales: A Fantasy Anthology by Female Authors (2023) with Damaris Browne, E J Tett and Susan Boulton
