= Natalia Matolinets =

Ukrainian novelist and short stories writer

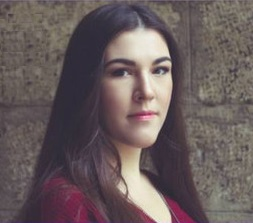
- Born: 20 December 1990 (age 35); Lviv, Ukraine
- Education: Ivan Franko National University of Lviv
- Occupations: Novelist; short-story writer
- Writing career
- Years active: 2005–present
- Genre: Fantasy

Natalia Matolinets (Ukrainian: Наталія Матолінець; born 20 December 1990) is a Ukrainian novelist and short stories writer. The winner of ESFS Chrysalis award (2023).

== Career ==
Natalia Matolinets was born in Lviv, Ukraine in 1990. She attended Ivan Franko National University of Lviv to study journalism and graduated in 2013.

She is the author of several novels, including the urban fantasy trilogy Varta in the Game, inspired by various European cities. Other works include mythological fantasy Hessie, Amaterasu Academy, All My Keys and Gaia and historical Ceramic Hearts.

Among her accolades are the Eurocon 2023 Chrysalis Award from ESFS, "Best Debut" and "Best Series" distinctions from BaraBooka, BBC Children's Book of the Year shortlist, etc.

She has served as a literary resident of Gdańsk City Culture Institute and Gdańsk City of Literature in 2022, and held the same position in Prague UNESCO City of Literature in 2023. Guest speaker of festivals and panel discussions in Poland, the Czech Republic, Bulgaria, Sweden and the United Kingdom. A member of Swedish PEN since 2024.

Her book Varta in the Game was published in translation by Fragment Publishing House, Czech Republic, in 2023. Her books and short stories are translated to Polish, Czech, Bulgarian and English.

Natalia Matolinets is a co-founder of the Ukrainian literary association "Fantastic talk(s)", along with four other Ukrainian science fiction writers - Natalia Dovgopol, Iryna Grabovska, Daria Piskozub, and Svitlana Taratorina.

== Published work ==
=== Novels ===
- Varta in the Game (2018)
- Hessie (2018)
- Varta in the Game. The Artifact of Prague (2019)
- Amaterasu Academy (2019)
- Ceramic Hearts (2020)
- Varta in the Game. The Blood of Budapest (2021)
- All My Keys and Gaia (2022)
- All My Keys and Gaia. Northern Fire (2024)

=== Novellas ===
- The Alliance for the Rescue of Tiles and People (2023)

=== Short stories ===
- The Lady of the Starry Jars (NewMyths.Com, 2024)
- A Name Bead and a Demon (In Another Time Magazine, 2024)

=== Translated books ===
- novel Hra temné čarodějky – Bitva začíná (Fragment, Czech Republic, 2023)
- novel Warta w Grze (Nyks, Poland, 2025)
- short story Strażnik zagrożenia (Stalker Books, Poland, 2022)
- short story A Box for Buttons, Tips and Rose Petal Jam (Tales & Feathers magazine, Canada, 2023)
- short story Skrzynka na guziki, napiwki i konfitury z róży (Nowa Fantastyka, Poland, 2024)
- short story Odległe pokoje (Nowa Fantastyka, Poland, 2025)
- short story All Necklaces Shielding the Goddess (MA Publishing, University of Exeter, England, 2025)
- essays How are you? (Literaturen vestnik, Bulgaria, 2024)
