= TitanCon =

Speculative fiction convention in Ireland

- TitanCon logo
- Genre: Science fiction, fantasy, Game of Thrones
- Location: Belfast
- Country: Northern Ireland
- Inaugurated: 2011
- Website: http://www.Titancon.com/

TitanCon is a convention held annually in Belfast. It began when different groups including the Brotherhood Without Banners (BWB), who wanted a Game of Thrones fan convention in Belfast and The Other Ones, a Belfast SF/F society who wanted a science fiction and fantasy convention in Belfast. Working with Logan Bruce from Studio NI, Arkham Gaming Centre and TableTopNorth, the groups began their collaboration in Octocon 2010 in Dublin.

== History ==
George RR Martin was the Guest of Honour at Octocon in Dublin in 2010. Game of Thrones had begun filming using Northern Ireland as one of the locations of the TV series. A previous gathering of GoT fans, called the Moot had been held in 2009 and a second one, Moot 2, planned to coincide with Martin's visit to Ireland. Collaboration between all the groups who wanted to have a convention in Belfast gathered and the new Northern Ireland convention was initiated. Moot2 was a success and TitanCon began the following year.

The convention expanded when it won the bid to host EuroCon 2019 when Dublin hosted Worldcon that year and Martin was the Guest of Honour for the convention.

=== Guests ===
Guests for the convention have included: Adrian Tchaikovsky, Andy Luke, Blackstaff Press, Brutal Ballet, David Bradshaw, & Leonard Boyd, Debbie (DJ) McCune, Elliot Grove, Emma Andrews, George Clarke, Ian McDonald, Jan Siegel, Jo Zebedee, Joanna Volpe, Joe Abercrombie, Joseph Campo, Ken Gregory, Ken Magee, Laurence Donaghy, Leigh Bardugo, Medieval Combat Group, Michael Stuart, and Kristy Robinson, Pat Cadigan, Patrick Brown, Paul J Holden, Paul Kearney, Peadar Ó Guilín, Richard Crawford, Roz Kaveney, Ruth Frances Long, Sarah Pinborough, Spence Wright, T.A. Moore, Taryn Southern, The Clandestine, Zoë Sumra.

=== Locations and dates ===
- 24 September 2011, Europa Exhibition Centre, Belfast
- 22 September 2012, Europa Exhibition Centre, Belfast
- 6–8 September 2013, Wellington Park Hotel, Belfast
- 12–14 September 2014, Wellington Park Hotel, Belfast
- 25–27 September 2015, Wellington Park Hotel, Belfast
- 30-2 Sept/ Oct 2016, Wellington Park Hotel, Belfast
- 5–10 September 2017, Wellington Park Hotel, Belfast
- 24–26 August 2018, Wellington Park Hotel, Belfast
- 22–24 August 2019, Waterfront Convention Centre, Belfast

== See also ==
- Eurocon
- Game of Thrones
