= Tim Skorenko =

Russian writer

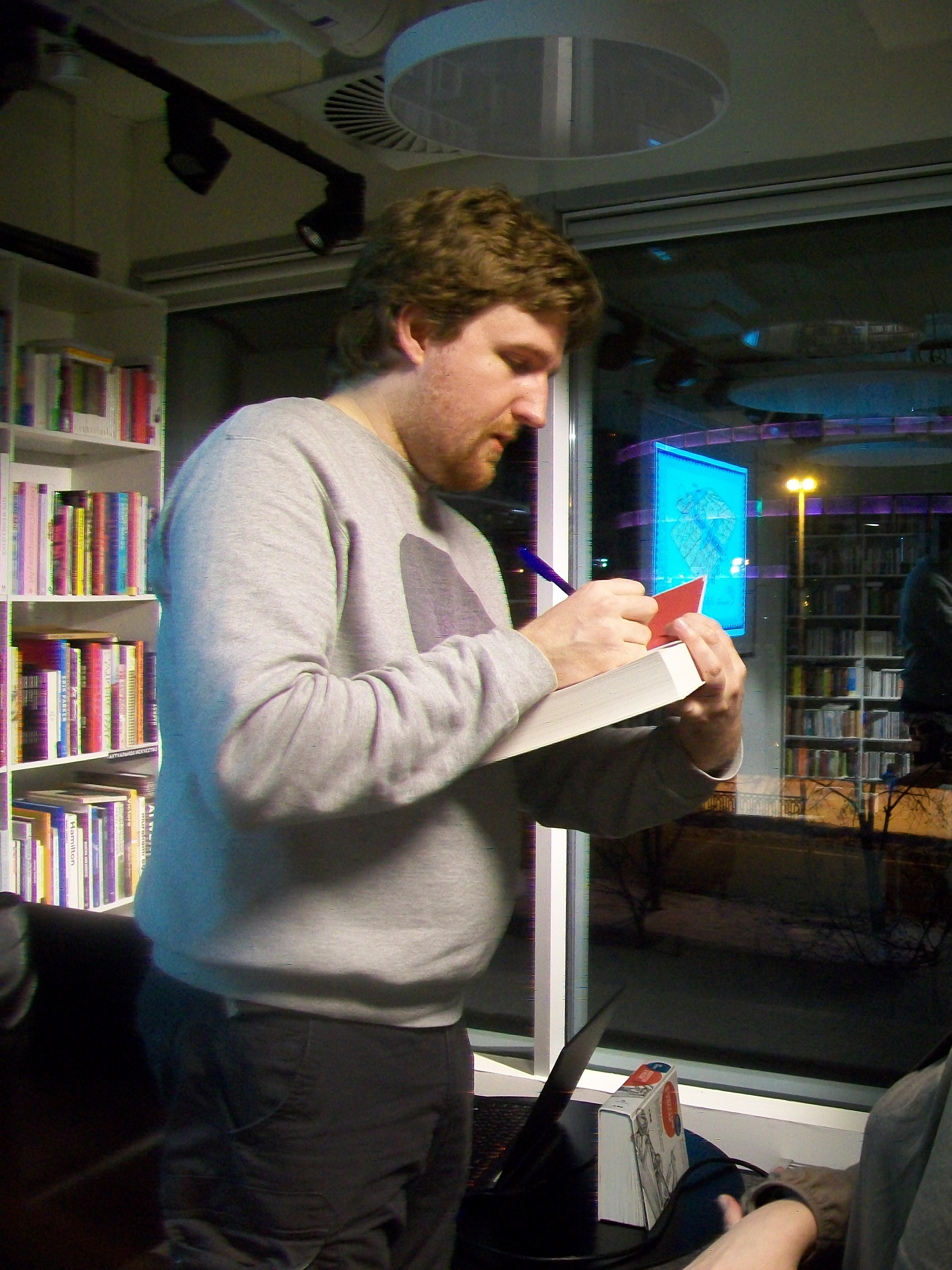
- Tim Skorenko in 2018
- Born: Timofey Yuryevich Skorenko; February 28, 1983 (age 43); Minsk, Byelorussian SSR, Soviet Union
- Education: Belarusian National Technical University
- Occupations: Writer, journalist, poet, singer-songwriter, security awareness specialist
- Writing career
- Pen name: Tim Skorenko, Eric Delahaye
- Genres: Speculative fiction, literary realism
- Notable works: The Garden of Hieronymus Bosch (2011), Everest (2018)
- Website: www.timskorenko.ru/en/, skorenko.com

Timofey (Tim) Yuryevich Skorenko (Russian: Тимофей Юрьевич Скоренко, Belarusian: Цімафей Юр'евіч Скарэнка; born 28 February 1983) is a Russian and Belarusian author of Ukrainian origin, writing mostly in Russian, as well as a poet, singer-songwriter, and journalist. His writing combines elements of speculative fiction and literary realism, including several realistic and historical works. Tim Skorenko is a science communicator and gives lectures on science and technology.

== Biography ==
Tim Skorenko graduated from the Belarusian National Technical University with a degree in Internal Combustion Engines. Until 2009, he worked at the Minsk Automobile Plant as a test engineer for car acoustics, and in 2009 he moved to Moscow, becoming an editor at the What's New in Science and Technology magazine (Russian edition of Popular Science). At the end of the same year, he joined the Russian edition of Popular Mechanics. Since 2018, he has been working at Kaspersky Lab as a security awareness specialist.

== Prose ==
Tim Skorenko began writing prose in 2004. In 2007, he was shortlisted for the independent literary award Debut. His first published work was the short story “Quiet Games” in the almanac Noon. XXI century (No. 9, 2008). The first major published work was the novel Ode to Absolute Cruelty (2010). Tim Skorenko's second novel, The Garden of Hieronymus Bosch (2011), was longlisted for the Big Book and National Bestseller awards, and won a number of genre awards, including the Bronze Snail of Boris Strugatsky. He has published 46 short stories and eight novels.

== Journalism and popularization of science ==
From 2009 to 2018, Tim Skorenko worked as a science journalist, first for What's New in Science and Technology and later for the Russian edition of Popular Mechanics. He collaborated as a columnist with some other magazines, including Mir Fantastiki and Vokrug sveta. He published more than 400 articles in Popular Mechanics, Mir Fantastiki, What's New in Science and Technology, Vokrug sveta, and Russian editions of GQ, Maxim, Tatler, Cosmopolitan, among others. From 2015 to 2018, he worked as the editor-in-chief of the Popular Mechanics website.

He published a number of popular science books. The book Invented in Russia: History of Russian Inventive Thought from Peter I to Nicholas II was shortlisted for the 2017 Enlightener Prize, while the book Invented in the USSR: History of Inventive Thought from 1917 to 1991 was on the long list of the 2019 Enlightener Prize.

In addition, Tim Skorenko has authored several non-fiction books aimed at children. The book Think and Invent was published both in Russia in Russian and in Ukraine in Ukrainian.

The book Invented in the USSR: History of Inventive Thought from 1917 to 1991 has been translated into Chinese and published in China in 2023.

== Critical reviews ==
Tim Skorenko's books have been repeatedly reviewed by literary critics. In particular, Galina Yuzefovich writes about the novel Everest: "Skorenko constructs the plot framework excellently. Mixing factual details with imagination, shuffling chronological layers, deftly shifting the focus from one character to another (we see the events through the eyes of Wilson, John Kelly, Mallory's companion, and young Andrew Irvine), he manages to maintain intrigue – who was the first to reach Everest? – until the very last page. This ability to keep the reader in suspense, constantly fueling their curiosity with various historical and mountaineering insights, without ever revealing the main point, constitutes the primary – and very important – merit of the novel."

Literary critic Vasily Vladimirsky writes in the newspaper Sankt-Peterburgskie Vedomosti about the novel Glass: "Skorenko stays away from the busiest highways of the 'current literary process,' preferring to move along a parallel route. The questions he raises in Glass – the interplay between violence and power, the nature of unquestioning faith, psychological dependency, victim syndrome, and so on – make the novel more akin to contemporary relevant prose."

The book Think and Invent is included by book reviewer Evgeniya Shaffert in the list of the top 50 best Russian children's books written in the 21st century.

Critical reviews of Tim Skorenko's books have repeatedly appeared in various Russian print and online publications.

== Awards and prizes ==
Skorenko has received several literary awards, including Eurocon (Stockholm, 2011), Bronze Snail (St. Petersburg, 2011), Bronze Caduceus (Kharkiv, 2011), Days of Science Fiction (Kyiv, 2011) and others. In 2015, he received the Alexander Belyaev Literary Prize for a series of essays Entertaining scientific experiments and master classes, published in the Popular Mechanics magazine. He has also received several poetry awards: Ilya Prize (2009), Literary Vienna (2010), O. Beshenkovskaya Prize (2010/11), and others.

Laureate of the XLI Grushinsky festival as a singer-songwriter (2014).

Laureate of the 18th National Media Manager of Russia Award in the nomination Electronic Media / Online Media (For expanding the territory of the brand beyond the press, the successful development of the project and the formation of a new audience in the digital space).

== Bibliography ==
English titles are translations of the original Russian titles unless otherwise indicated.

=== Fiction ===
sources:

- The Ode to Absolute Cruelty / Ода абсолютной жестокости (2010) — novel
- The Garden of Hieronymus Bosch / Сад Иеронима Босха (2011) — novel
- The Laws of Applied Euthanasia / Законы прикладной эвтаназии (2011) — novel
- Along the Blade of Words / Вдоль по лезвию слов (2012) — short story collection
- Legends of Unknown America / Легенды неизвестной Америки (2013) — novel; 2 editions
- The Bookbinder / Переплётчик (2014) — novel (under the pseudonym Eric Delahaye)
- Everest / Эверест (2018) — novel
- Glass / Стекло (2021) — novel
- Songs of Judith / Песни Юдифи (2026) — novel

=== Non-fiction ===
Sources:

- Evolution of Thought in Significant Dates of Science and Exhibits of the Polytechnic Museum (2017)
- Invented in Russia: History of Russian Inventive Thought from Peter I to Nicholas II (2017) — 17 editions, including numbered, commercial, gift, audio, e-book and Chinese-language editions
- Popular Mechanics. Entertaining Tests and Experiments (2018) — 2 editions
- Polytech Calendar 2068 (2018)
- Invented in the USSR: History of Inventive Thought from 1917 to 1991 (2019) — 12 editions, including numbered, commercial, gift, audio, e-book and Chinese-language editions
- PR Me If You Can. Instructions for a PR Specialist Written by a Journalist (2019)
- Think and Invent (2020) — children's book; 2 editions (Russian and Ukrainian)
- How the Inedible Becomes Edible (2023) — children's book, co-authored with Tatiana Alekseeva; 2 editions (Russian and Chinese)
- Mars Rover, Accordion, MRI: The History of Armenian Inventive Thought (2024)
- The World of Mechanic Kulibin: A Man Who Could Do Anything (2025) — children's book

=== Poems ===
- Dogs of the Lord / Псы Господни (2011). Collection of poems.

=== Audiobooks ===
- PR Me If You Can. Instructions for a PR Specialist Written by a Journalist (read by Tim Skorenko) (2019)
- Glass / Стекло (read by Tim Skorenko) (2021)

== Discography ==
- Ironheart / Железное сердце (2008)
- After Gardel / После Гарделя (2021)
- Who Will Be Selected / Кого отберут (2021)
- For a Time Traveler / Путешественнику во времени (2021)
- Alyarin / Алярин (2021)
- Diary / Дневник (2022)
- Backwards / Обратно (2025)
- Abyssal / Абиссаль (2026)
- Tattoo / Татуировка (2026)
