= Anna Starobinets =

Russian writer

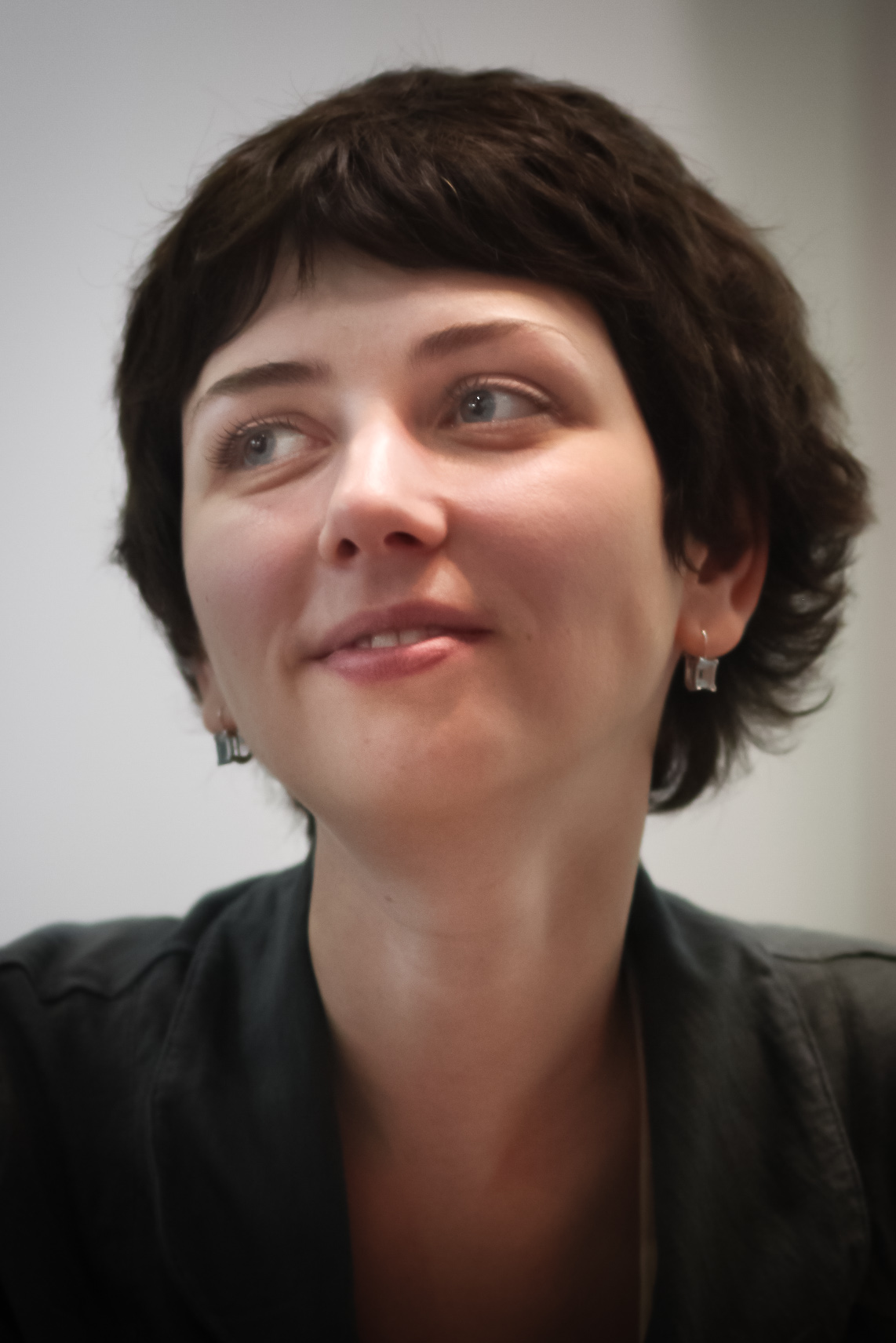
Starobinets in 2011

Anna Alfredovna Starobinets (Russian:Анна Старобинец, born 1978) is a Russian writer and scriptwriter who has been called the "Russian Queen of Horror". She has published novels, short stories and children's books, and describes herself as writing "horror and supernatural fiction for adults, and also fairy and detective stories for children".

== Personal life ==
Starobinets was born in Moscow in 1978. Her husband, writer Alexander Garros, died in 2017, after which she had "writer's block" for 18 months. She has two children, and a poodle.

She has said that her favourite book is Neil Gaiman's American Gods.

== Writing ==
Starobinets' first published work, the short story collection An Awkward Age (2010), was a finalist in the Russian National Bestseller Prize. It comprises "chilling short stories set in the streets of Moscow and various creepy parallel worlds", and has been translated into seven languages. It has been described as "one of the most stunning debuts to come out of Russia since Victor Pelevin: hip, funny, angry, and dark as hell" and as "an insightful take on the contemporary condition of man—in Russia and further afield".

Catlantis (2015) was her first children's book to be translated into English, and was listed in The Telegraph's 2015 "Best Christmas books for children" and described by The Guardian as "a madcap and highly original adventure". It was translated by Jane Bugaeva, who also translated In the Wolf's Lair.

Starobinets describes Look At Him (2017) as an "autobiographical non-fiction novel about the loss of an unborn baby in Russia". She has written a four-book children's series The Beastly Crimes books, which have been published in English as In the Wolf's Lair (2018), A Predator's Rights (2019), Claws of Rage (2019) and The Plucker (2019).

Her book Lis'i Brody(Russian: Лисьи броды, lit. 'Fox Fords') was called "one of the best novels of 2022" by Mir Fantastiki.

Starobinets was awarded the European SF Award in the category of "Hall of Fame: Best Author" in 2018.

== Selected publications (translated into English) ==
- Starobinets, Anna (2019). The Plucker. Translated by Bugaeva, Jane. Dover. ISBN 978-1782690887.
- Starobinets, Anna (2019). Claws of Rage. Translated by Bugaeva, Jane. Dover. ISBN 978-0486829524.
- Starobinets, Anna (2019). A Predator's Rights. Translated by Bugaeva, Jane. Dover. ISBN 978-0486829517.
- Starobinets, Anna (2018). In the Wolf's Lair. Translated by Bugaeva, Jane. Dover. ISBN 978-0486827629.
- Starobinets, Anna (2015). Catlantis. Translated by Bugaeva, Jane. Pushkin Children's Books. ISBN 978-1782690887.
- Starobinets, Anna (2015). The Living. Translated by Rann, James. Hesperus Press. ISBN 978-1843913771.
- Starobinets, Anna (2015). The Icarus Gland: and other stories of metamorphosis. Translated by Rann, James. Skyscraper publications. ISBN 978-1843913771.
- Starobinets, Anna (2010). An Awkward Age. Translated by Aplin, Hugh. Hesperus Press. ISBN 978-1843917144.
