= Oein DeBhairduin =

Irish Traveller activist, educator, administrator, and writer

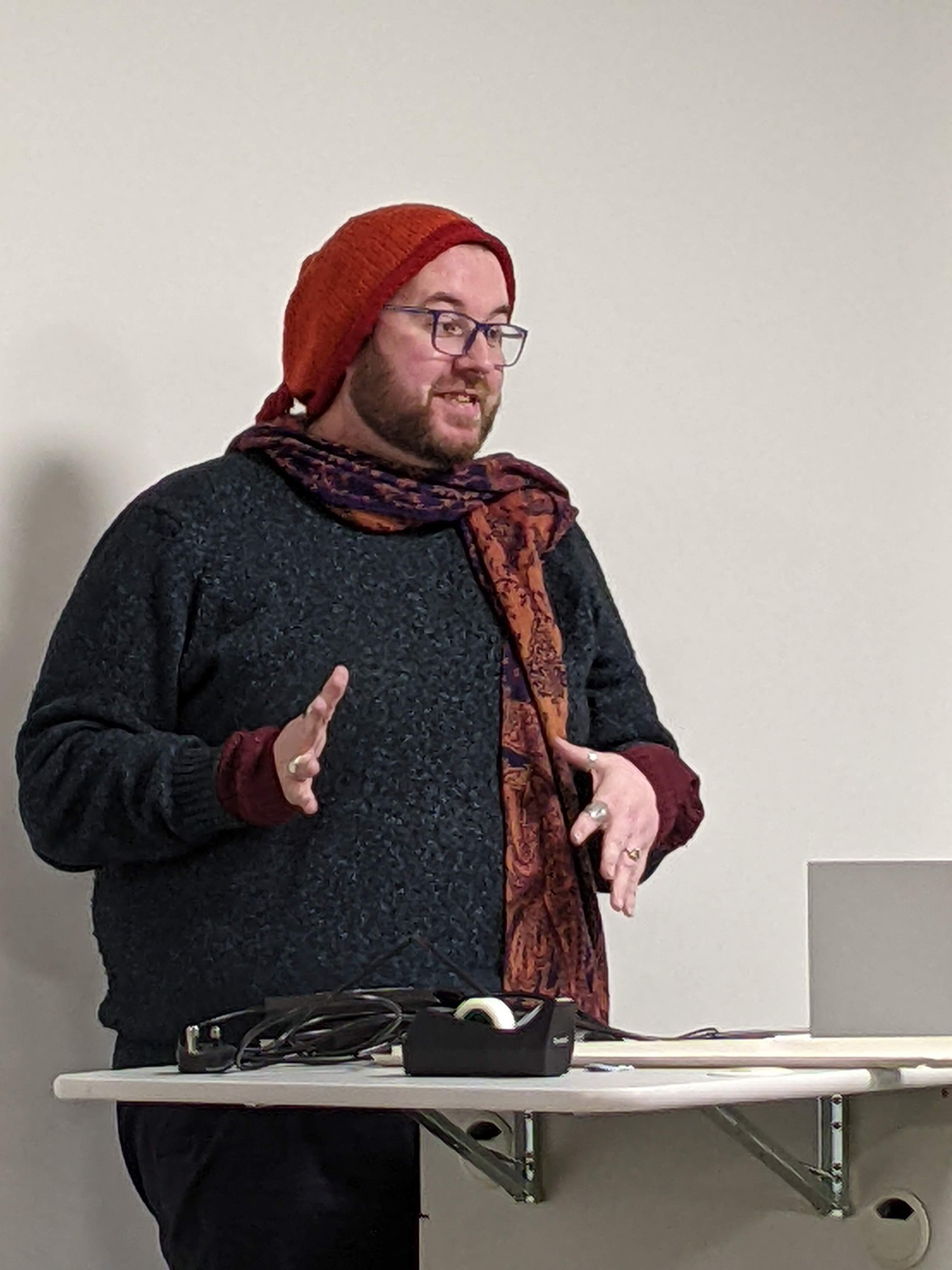
- DeBhairduin in March 2023
- Born: Tuam, County Galway
- Education: NUI Galway
- Known for: writer, activist

Oein DeBhairduin is an Irish Traveller activist, educator, administrator, and writer. He is the co-founder of LGBT Tara (Traveller and Roma Alliance).

== Publications ==
In September 2020, DeBhairduin published Why the moon travels, a collection of folktales from the Irish Traveller community retold. The book is illustrated by Leanne McDonagh, an artist and Traveller. It incorporates elements of the Gammon language. DeBhairduin collected over 100 stories, with 20 being included in this volume. It is believed to be the first book written and illustrated by Travellers about Traveller folklore. DeBhairduin has spoken about the difficulties of transitioning these oral stories to the written form, and the complications which arise regarding authority. The book was published and co-edited by Fionnuala Cloke and Gráinne O'Toole of Skein Press, who first encountered DeBhairduin writing on his blog, Keeping A Campfire. DeBhairduin consulted with his family and friends about the stories as they appeared in the final text.

He took part in the Cúirt Festival in April 2021.

In 2022, DeBhairduin co-published Weave, a collection of Solstice Stories along with Deirdre Sullivan, an Irish YA award writer. The book is illustrated by Yingge Xu, a Chinese ink brush artist.

In 2023, DeBhairduin published Twiggy Woman, a collection of ghost stories rooted in the oral tradition of the Irish Traveller community and illustrated by the renowned Helena Grimes. These chilling tales, collected by Oein from Traveller folklore are re-envisioned and retold for modern times.

In 2024, he published a second book about the Irish Traveller community: The Slug and the Snail. This book is a tale rooted in the oral tradition of the Traveller community and illustrated by Olya Anima. The book won the 2025 European Science Fiction Society Award for Best Work For Children.

In 2025, DeBhariduin was also involved in State, in Relation an artistic project exploring the Irish Constitution through contemporary creative practices. DeBhairduin's work was styled as a conversation between the Irish Constitution and the 1963 Report on Itinerancy.

In 2026, DeBhairduin published 'Sheila's Busy Day', a photographic picture book for children aged two to four. The book incorporates words from Cant, the traditional language of Irish Travellers.

== Activism ==
DeBhairduin is active in a number of campaigns and voluntary groups. He is co-founder of LGBT Tara (Traveller and Roma Alliance), and has spoken on numerous occasions about the lack of support for members of the Traveller community who are LGBT+.

In 2021, he took part in the Children's Books Ireland Mind Yourself Mental Health and Wellbeing Reading Guide campaign aimed at children under 12 in 2021. He spoke about the experiences of minorities in Ireland regarding institutional racism during the COVID-19 pandemic.

== Awards ==
In 2019, DeBhairduin won the Traveller Pride Award for Enterprise and Employment. DeBhairduin and McDonagh were awarded a Judges' Special Award prize at the 2021 Children's Books Ireland for Why the moon travels. DeBhairduin was awarded the Creative Places Tuam inaugural Thinking on Tuam Artist Residency in 2020.

== Personal life ==
Oein DeBhairduin was born near Tuam, County Galway in 1985. DeBhairduin attended St Jarlath's College, in Tuam before entering NUI Galway to study psychology. After graduation he worked as a clerical officer. In 2017, he moved to Clondalkin, Dublin. He worked at the Clondalkin Travellers' Training Centre as manager and employment director. In 2018, he became the first Traveller to work in the Oireachtas, working in Senator Colette Kelleher's office. In 2020, he was working as the manager of the Education Centre in Cloverhill Prison, Clondalkin. As of February 2022 he is the Traveller Culture Collections Development Officer with the National Museum of Ireland.
