= 53rd World Science Fiction Convention =

53rd Worldcon (1995)

Intersection, the 53rd World Science Fiction Convention
- Genre: Science fiction
- Dates: 24–28 August 1995
- Venue: SEC Centre
- Location: Glasgow
- Country: United Kingdom
- Attendance: 4,173
- Organizer: Worldcon (Scotland) Ltd.
- Filing status: Non-profit
- Website: Official website

The 53rd World Science Fiction Convention (Worldcon), also known as Intersection, was held on 24–28 August 1995 at the SEC Centre and the nearby Moat House Hotel in Glasgow, United Kingdom. Evening social events also took place at the Central and Crest Hotels.

The organising committee was co-chaired by Vincent Docherty and Martin Easterbrook.

The convention was the first Worldcon to be held in Scotland and was also the 1995 Eurocon.

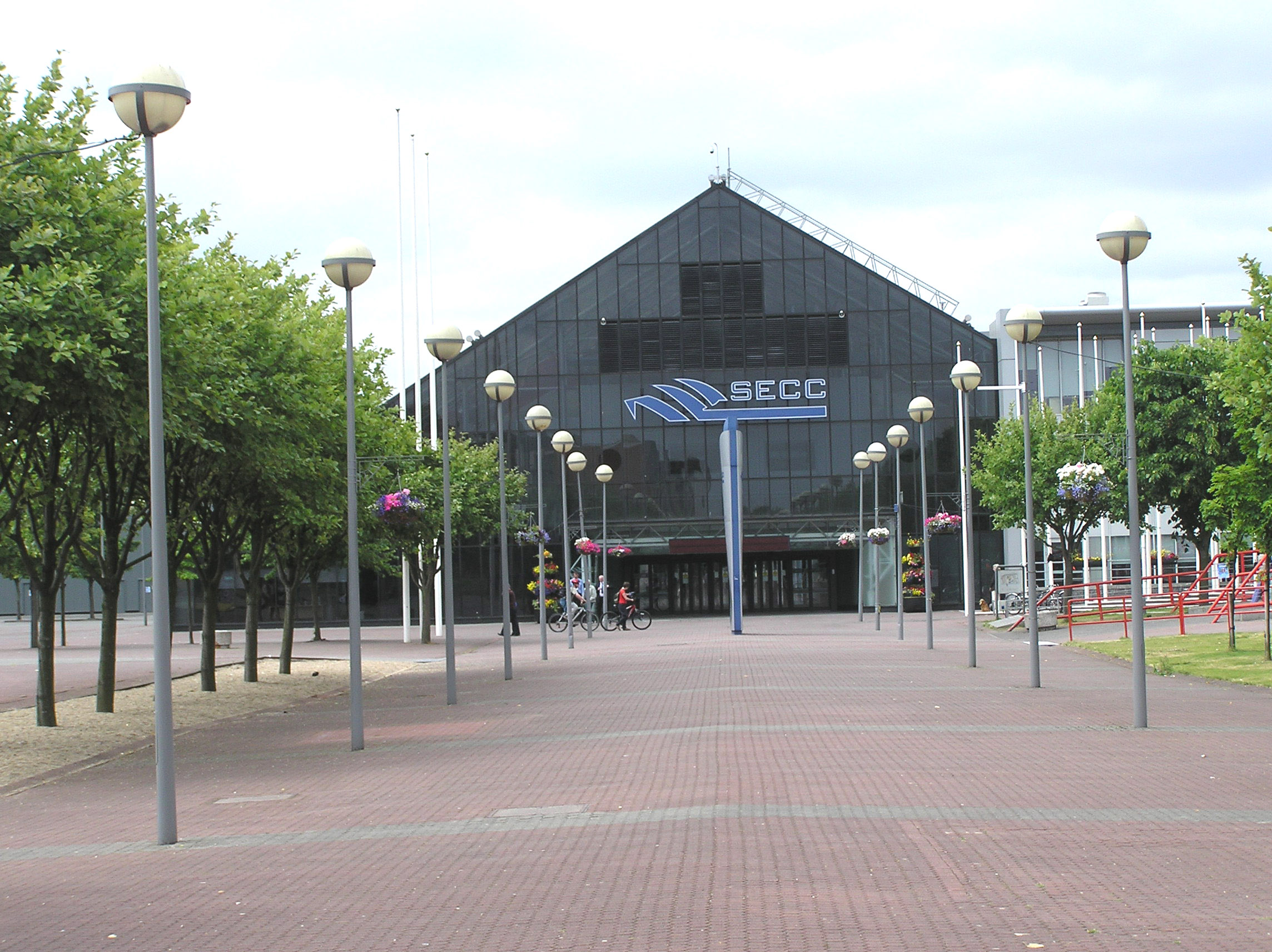
The front of the SEC Centre in Glasgow, Scotland.

== Participants ==
Attendance was 4,173, out of 6,524 paid memberships.

=== Guests of Honour ===
- Samuel R. Delany (writer)
- Gerry Anderson (media)
- Les Edwards (artist)
- Vin¢ Clarke (fan)
- Mike Jittlov (special guest)
- Diane Duane and Peter Morwood were Toast Mr & Mrs (toastmasters)

== Awards ==
The World Science Fiction Society administers and presents the Hugo Awards, the oldest and most noteworthy award for science fiction. Selection of the recipients is by vote of the Worldcon members. Categories include novels and short fiction, artwork, dramatic presentations, and various professional and fandom activities.

Other awards may be presented at Worldcon at the discretion of the individual convention committee. This has often included the national SF awards of the host country, such as the Japanese Seiun Awards as part of Nippon 2007, and the Prix Aurora Awards as part of Anticipation in 2009. The Astounding Award for Best New Writer and the Sidewise Award, though not sponsored by the Worldcon, are usually presented, as well as the Chesley Awards, the Prometheus Award, and others. In 2021, the Nommo Awards began presenting at Worldcon.

=== 1995 Hugo Awards ===
- Best Novel: Mirror Dance by Lois McMaster Bujold
- Best Novella: "Seven Views of Olduvai Gorge" by Mike Resnick
- Best Novelette: "The Martian Child" by David Gerrold
- Best Short Story: "None So Blind" by Joe Haldeman
- Best Non-Fiction Book: I.Asimov: A Memoir by Isaac Asimov
- Best Dramatic Presentation: "All Good Things..." - Star Trek: The Next Generation Written by Ronald D. Moore & Brannon Braga and directed by Winrich Kolbe
- Best Professional Editor: Gardner Dozois
- Best Professional Artist: Jim Burns
- Best Original Art Work: Lady Cottington's Pressed Fairy Book by Brian Froud and Terry Jones
- Best Semiprozine: Interzone edited by David Pringle
- Best Fanzine: Ansible edited by Dave Langford
- Best Fan Writer: David Langford
- Best Fan Artist: Teddy Harvia

=== Other awards ===
- John W. Campbell Award for Best New Writer: Jeff Noon

== Notes ==
The British science fiction writer John Brunner died of a stroke on 25 August 1995, while attending the convention.

A Channel 4 magazine programme about the event and Science Fiction in Scotland, ‘Beam Me Up, Scotty!’, was filmed at the convention and presented by Craig Charles.

== See also ==
- Hugo Award
- Science fiction
- Speculative fiction
- World Science Fiction Society
- Worldcon

Preceded by 52nd World Science Fiction Convention; ConAdian in Winnipeg, Manitoba, Canada (1994)	List of Worldcons; 53rd World Science Fiction Convention; Intersection in Glasgow, UK (1995)	Succeeded by 54th World Science Fiction Convention; L.A.con III in Anaheim, California, United States (1996)
