= Jana Plauchová =

Slovak sci-fi writer (born 1987)

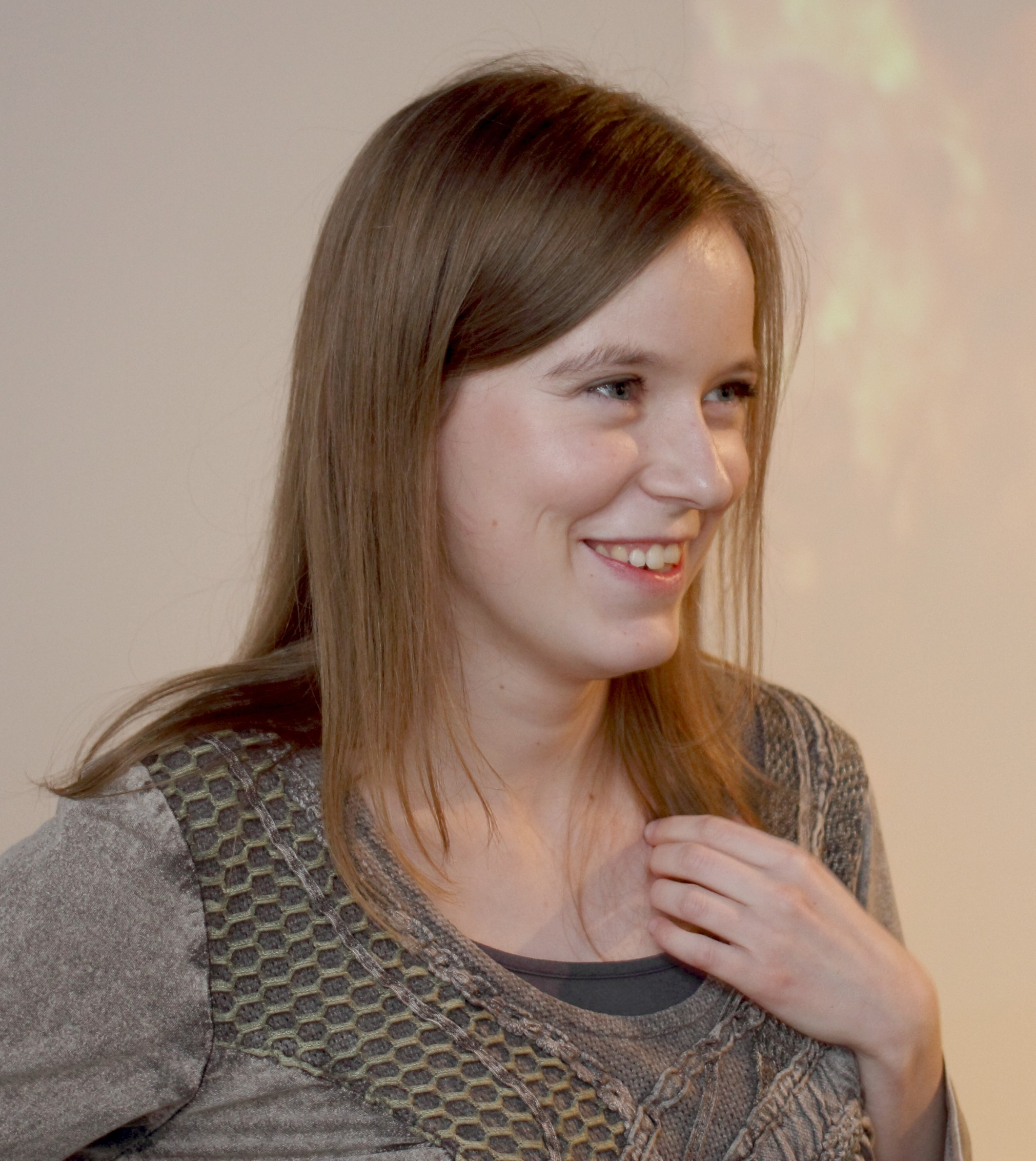
- Jana Plauchová in 2014
- Born: 8 September 1987 (age 38); Banská Bystrica, Czechoslovakia
- Education: Matej Bel University; Comenius University
- Occupations: Astrobiologist, writer
- Writing career
- Language: Slovak
- Genre: Science fiction

Jana Plauchová (born 8 September 1987) is a Slovak astrobiologist and sci-fi writer. She published four novels.

== Biography ==
Jana Plauchová was born on 8 September 1987 in Banská Bystrica, where she was educated at the local grammar school. She became interested in space and astronautics as a 15-year-old, following the Space Shuttle Columbia disaster.

Plauchová studied biology at the Matej Bel University and obtained a master's degree in Molecular biology from the Comenius University, graduating in 2012. She published her first novel Zero Kelvin right after graduation.

As of 2023, Plauchová works as a researcher at the Maximilián Hell Planetarium and Observatory in Žiar nad Hronom. She lives in Kremnica.

== Literary works ==
Jana Plauchová is a careful writer. She starts writing only when she has the entire story throughout. She considers characters emotions just as important as scientific accuracy in sci fi writing. Even though her novels commonly contain extraterrestrial characters, she does not believe in the existence of the life outside Earth.

Plauchová completed her first manuscript as a 17 year old but did not consider it of sufficient quality for publication. Her first published novel Zero kelvin, published in 2012 was her fifth completed manuscript. In spite of the book's critical and commercial success, Plauchová was not happy with the quality of the editing and published a new edition of the book in 2022. Following her first novel, she followed with three additional novels - The eternity of errors (2013), The Introduction to Chaos Theory (2016), and The Second Planet (2019). As of 2023, she is working on the sequel to Zero Kelvin. In addition to writing novels, Plauchová writes short stories, popular science articles and edits the Slovak language Wikipedia.

== Criticism ==
According to the literary publicist Lucia Lackovičová, Plauchová is the only notable contemporary sci-fi writer in Slovakia. Fantasy writer Alexandra Pavelková referred to Plauchová as the best hard sci-fi author in the country.
