= Pilar Ramírez Tello =

Spanish translator (born 1976)

- Born: 1976 (age 49–50)
- Education: Binghamton University
- Occupation: Translator
- Known for: Spanish translation of The Hunger Games

Pilar Ramírez Tello (born 1976 in Granada) is an English–Spanish translator of technical, literary and legal texts. She translated The Hunger Games and the Divergent series to Spanish.

== Early life ==
In 1994, Ramírez Tello studied at the University of Granada to pursue a degree in translation and interpreting. In 1999, after graduating, she extended her training by obtaining a master's degree in comparative literature and translation in the University of Binghamton, State of New York. A few years after finishing her master's degree, she devoted herself to full-time literary translation.

== Career ==
She translated more than fifty books for publishers such as RBA, Salamandra and Penguin Random House. In addition to producing literary translations, she works as a freelance translator, and has worked for a year and a half as an adjunct professor of Spanish in the Department of Romance Languages at Binghamton University.

=== "Sinsajo" ===
Tello created the term "sinsajo", the iconic bird of the dystopian science fiction novel The Hunger Games. This word would later provide the Spanish title to the two last films of the saga. She has explained in several interviews the process involved in creating this word, whose English equivalent is ‘Mockingjay.’

In the story, Mockingjays were created essentially by accident. The father of the species was the jabberjay, a breed of exclusively male birds that were created as mutations by the Capitol. Initially created to eavesdrop on rebels during the Dark Days, jabberjays had the ability to memorize entire conversations and repeat them back to their Capitol handlers. However, once the rebels realized this, they simply fed endless lies to the birds, and sent them back loaded with false information. After the lies were discovered, the Capitol shut down the operation and the jabberjays were released into the wild, in the hope that they would die off. Eventually, they did die off, but not before passing on their genetic code by mating with female mockingbirds. This was unforeseen, because no one expected the jabberjays to be able to reproduce with other bird species. The offspring were called mockingjays. In Spanish "jabberjay" can be translated as "charlajo", meaning "a bird that can talk" ("charla") and "mockingjay" in Spanish is "sinsonte". So she combined these two names to create the new species: "sinsajo".

== Translated books ==
Translations by Ramírez Tello
Author	Title	Spanish Title	Publisher	Year
Asimov, Isaac	The Complete Robot		Alamut	2008
Banks, Iain M.	Against a Dark Background		La factoria de ideas	2005
Barker, Clive	Books of Blood		La factoría de ideas	2004
Beukes, Lauren	The Shining Girls		RBA	2013
Borchardt, Alice	The Wolf King		La factoría de ideas	2003
Bowman, Erin	Taken		Almuzara	2008
Broderik, Damien	Godplayers		La factoría de ideas	2003
Brooks, Max	World War Z		Almuzara	2008
Carter, Ally	Heist Society		RBA	2011
Collins, Suzanne	Hunger Games	Los Juegos del Hambre	RBA	2009
	Catching Fire	En Llamas	RBA	2010
	Mockingjay	Sinsajo	RBA	2011
	Year of the Jungle		RBA	2013
Connolly, John	The Book of Lost Things		Oniro	2008
Crowley, Cath	Graffiti Moon		RBA	2011
de Board, Aliette	Xuya Universe		Fata Libelli	2014
Dixon, Nell	Blue Remembered Heels		Algaida	2010
Houck, Colleen	Tiger's Quest		RBA	2011
	Tiger's Voyage		RBA	2012
	Tiger's Destiny		RBA	2013
Hunt, Stephen	The Kingdom Beyond the Waves		Oniro	2009
LaZebnik, Claire	Epic Fail		RBA	2012
MacHale, D.J.	Pendragon: The Merchant of Death	El mercader de la muerte	Tropismos	2006
	Pendragon: The Lost City of Faar	La ciudad perdida de Faar	Tropismos	2007
	Pendragon: The Never War	La guerra que nunca existió	Tropismos	2022
MacLeod, Ian R.	The Light Ages		La factoría de ideas	2005
Magorian, Michelle	Just Henry		Oniro	2009
Matheson, Richard	Short Stories		Gigamesh	2008
	Born of Man and Woman		Gigamesh	2014
McKinney, Meagan	Till Dawn Tames the Night		Nefer	2007
	Fair is the Rose		Nefer	2008
Pratchett, Terry	The Wee Free Men		Almuzura	2008
Resnick, Mike	Tomb Raider: The Amulet of Power		La factoría de ideas	2004
Reynolds, Alastair	Chams City		La factoría de ideas	2004
Riordan, Rick	Percy Jackson's Greek Gods		Salamandra	2015
Roth, Veronica	Divergent	Divergente	RBA	2011
	Insurgent	Insurgente	RBA	2012
	Allegiant	Leal	RBA	2014
	Four	Cuatro	RBA	2015
Skemp, Ethan	Magickeepers		La factoría de ideas	2002
Smith, Craig	The Painted Messiah		Algaida	2010
	The Blood Lance		Algaida	2010
Tahir, Sabaa	An Ember in the Ashes		Montena	2015
Waters, Daniel	Generation Dead		RBA	2009
	Kiss of Like		RBA	2010
	Passing Strange		RBA	2011
Wells, H.G.	The Invisible Man		RBA	2012
	The Island of Doctor Moreau		RBA	2012
Wiseman, Richard	59 seconds		RBA	2010
Yancey, Rick	The Fifth Wave	La Quinta Ola	RBA	2013
	The Infinite Sea		RBA	2014
	The Last Star		RBA	2016
