= Roman Shmarakov =

Russian writer (born 1971)

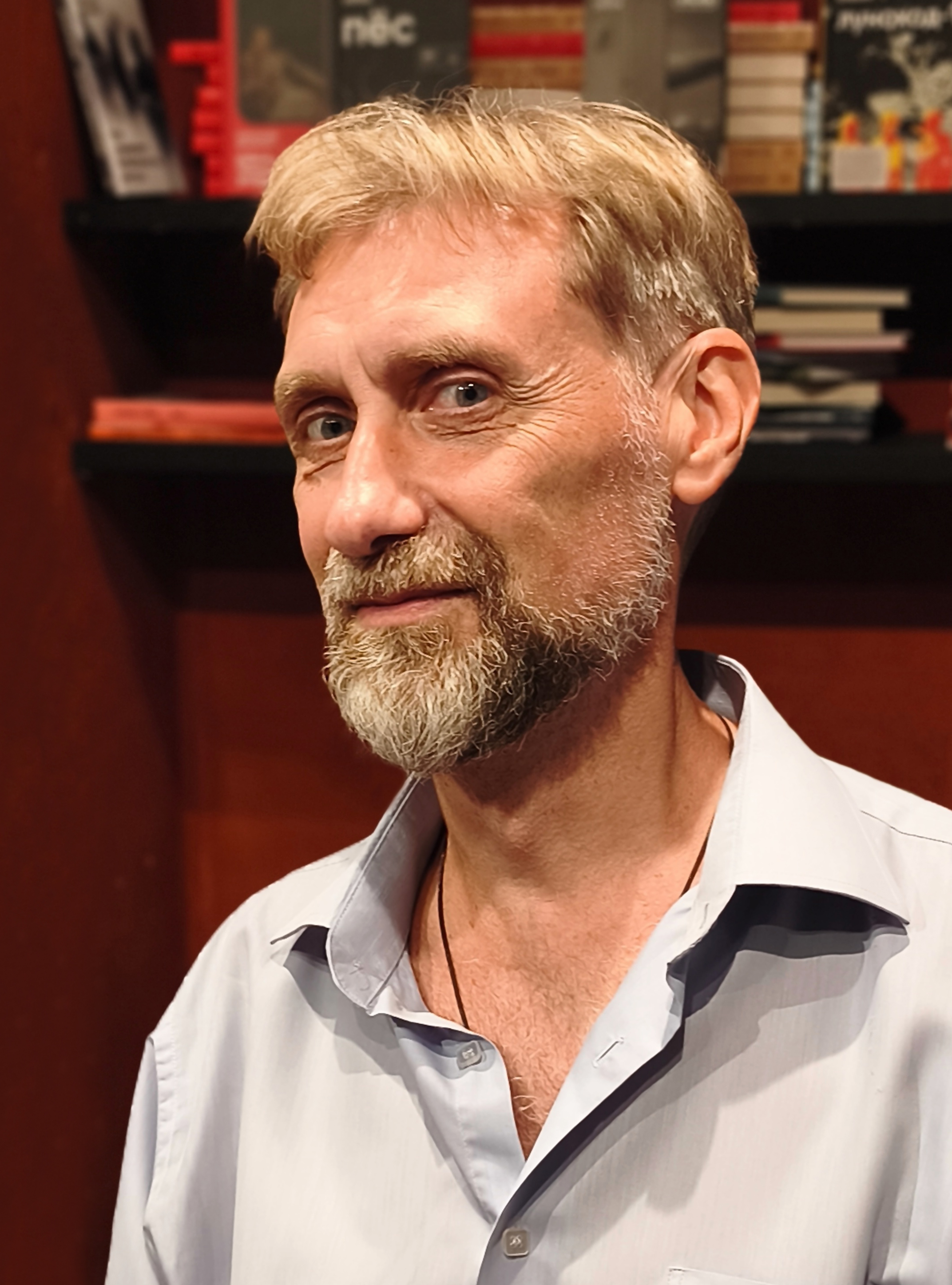

Roman Lvovich Shmarakov (Russian: Роман Львович Шмараков; June 12, 1971 in Tula) is a modern Russian writer, poet, translator, Doctor of Philology, lecturer, and blogger.

== Biography ==
In 1994 Roman Shmarakov graduated from Tula State Pedagogical University and worked as a teacher at its Department of Literature from 1994 till 2005. He took postgraduate courses at the Moscow State Pedagogical University Department of Russian Literature. In 1999 he defended his thesis, "Symbolic subtext of Demons, the novel by Dostoyevsky".

In 2003 Roman became an associate professor. In 2004 - 2007 he was a doctoral candidate of Moscow State Pedagogical University's Department of Russian Literature (defending his thesis, "The Russian reception of Claudian's poetry from late 17th century through early 20th century", in 2008). In December 2008, Roman Shmarakov became a Doctor of Philology.

After becoming a professor he worked at Tula State University's Department of Linguistics and Translation. He also worked as an editor of the Literature Questions magazine (2006).

Roman Shamarakov is the author of the first full translation of Claudian's works into Russian.

Since 2015, he has been working at the National Research University Higher School of Economics in Saint Petersburg as an Associate Professor in the Department of Comparative Literature and Linguistics.

He is a member of the Moscow Writers’ Union.

In 2014, he became a laureate of the EuroCon Award for Best Debut. In 2018, the manuscript of his novel Self-Portrait with an Oyster in My Pocket was shortlisted for the New Horizons Award and later longlisted for the National Bestseller Prize.

In 2021, he was longlisted for the Big Book Award for his novel Alkinoy.
