= Licia Troisi =

Italian fantasy writer

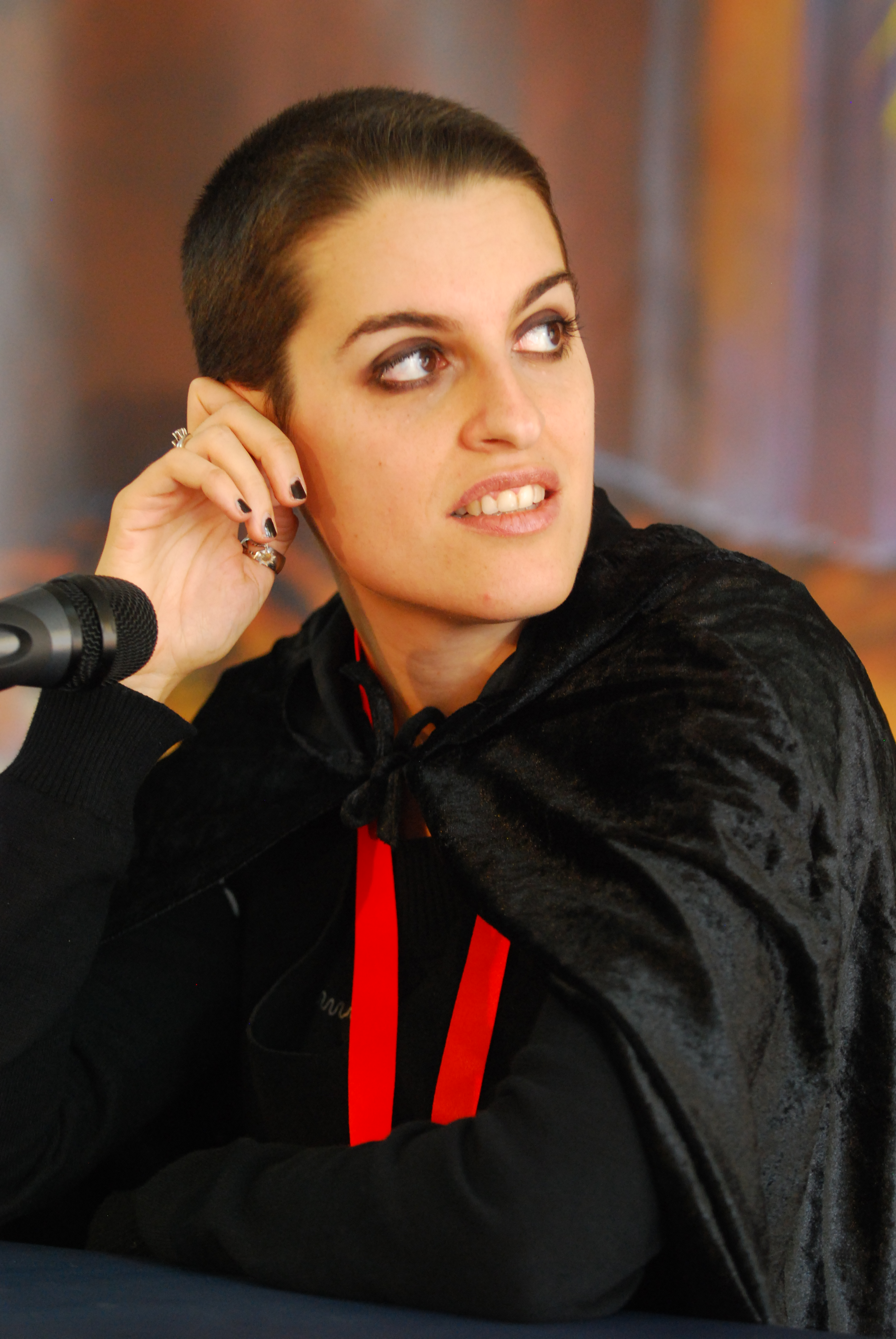
Licia Troisi at Lucca Comics & Games in 2011

Licia Troisi (born 25 November 1980 in Rome) is an Italian fantasy writer.

Her first published book was Nihal della terra del vento (Nihal of the Wind land), published in 2004. This is the first book of a fantasy trilogy entitled Cronache del mondo emerso (Chronicles of the Emerged World). Later, she embarked on a second trilogy, Le guerre del mondo emerso (Wars of the Emerged World) and Le leggende del Mondo Emerso (Legends of the Emerged World). She sold about 900,000 copies in Italy, which currently makes her the best-selling Italian fantasy writer. Her works have been translated into other languages, including German, Lithuanian, French, Dutch, Russian, Polish, Spanish, Portuguese and Romanian.

Resident in Rome, Licia Troisi also works in astrophysics at the Italian Space Agency. She graduated in physics with a specialization in astrophysics at the University of Rome Tor Vergata. Troisi was married in April 2007 and in December 2009 her daughter Irene was born.

== Works ==
=== Emerged world ===
- Cronache Del Mondo Emerso Chronicles of the Emerged World: 3 Books
  1. Nihal Della Terra Del Vento Nihal from the Land of Wind. Mondadori, April 2004.
  2. La Missione Di Sennar Sennar's Mission. Mondadori, October 2004.
  3. Il Talismano Del Potere The Talisman of Power. Mondadori, April 2005.
  4. Le storie perdute, Mondadori, October 2014.
- Le Guerre Del Mondo Emerso Wars of the Emerged World: 3 Books
  1. La Setta Degli Assassini The Guild of Assassins. Mondadori, April 2006.
  2. Le Due Guerriere The Two Warriors. Mondadori, February 27, 2007.
  3. Un Nuovo Regno A New Kingdom. Mondadori, November 13, 2007.
- Le Leggende del Mondo Emerso The Legends of the Emerged World: 3 Books, set 50 years after the Wars of the Emerged World
  - Il Destino Di Adhara Adhara's Destiny, November 18, 2008.
  - Figlia Del Sangue Daughter of the Blood. Mondadori, November 17, 2009.
  - Gli Ultimi Eroi The Last Heroes, Mondadori, November 30, 2010.

==== Comics ====
Cronache del mondo emerso - Le nuove avventure di Nihal comic

1. La paura, Panini Comics, June 5, 2009.
2. La rabbia, Panini Comics, June 5, 2009.
3. La disperazione, Panini Comics, November 5, 2009.
4. L'odio, Panini Comics, December 5, 2009.

Cronache del Mondo Emerso - Il viaggio di Nihal comic

1. Il libro di Shan, Panini Comics, February 2012.
2. Gli spiriti del deserto, Panini Comics, April 2012.
3. Incubi dal passato, Panini Comics, June 2012.
4. La speranza dei mezzelfi, Panini Comics, August 2012.

==== Illustrated books ====
- Le creature del Mondo Emerso, illustrated book. Mondadori, November 4, 2008
- Le guerre del Mondo Emerso - Guerrieri e creature, illustrated book. Mondadori, October 26, 2010

=== The Dragon Girl ===
1. L'eredità di Thuban, Thuban's Heritage. Mondadori, April 15, 2008.
2. L'albero di Idhunn,The Tree of Idhunn. Mondadori, April 26, 2009.
3. La clessidra di Aldibah,The Hourglass of Aldibah. Mondadori, June 1, 2010.
4. I gemelli di Kuma, The Twins of Kuma. Mondadori, May 10, 2011.
5. L'ultima battaglia,The Ultimate Battle. Mondadori, June 8, 2012.

=== Nashira's Reigns ===
1. Il sogno di Talitha, Talitha's Dream. Mondadori, November 11, 2011
2. Le spade dei ribelli, The Rebels' Swords. Mondadori, November 9, 2012
3. Il sacrificio, The Sacrifice. Mondadori, October 29, 2013
4. Il destino di Cetus, Cetus' Destiny. Mondadori, April 28, 2015

=== Pandora ===
1. Pandora, Mondadori, May 6, 2014.
2. Il risveglio di Samael, Samael's Awakening. Mondadori, January 4, 2016.
3. L'Erede di Gavri'el, Gavri'el's Heir. Mondadori, June 6, 2017.
4. Il potere di Arishat, Arishat's Power. Mondadori, April 30, 2018.

=== Stand alones ===
- I Dannati Di Malva Edizioni Ambiente, February 26, 2008
