= Octocon =

Speculative fiction convention in Ireland

Octocon, Ireland
- Octocon, Ireland logo
- Genre: Science fiction, fantasy
- Location: Dublin
- Country: Ireland
- Inaugurated: 1990
- Website: https://octocon.com/

Octocon, the National Irish Science Fiction Convention, begun as a project in 1989, was first held in 1990, and is held (almost) annually over a weekend in October. It has mostly been staged in Dublin, but for four years was in the university town of Maynooth and the 2026 edition is running in Cork. It was not held in 2003, or in 2014, when Ireland hosted that year's Eurocon, Shamrokon, in Dublin. The convention was virtual in 2020 and 2021 due to the COVID-19 pandemic and in October 2022 the first hybrid convention was held both at Croke Park convention centre and online, and 2023 and 2024 at both the Gibson Hotel in East Wall, and online.

== History ==
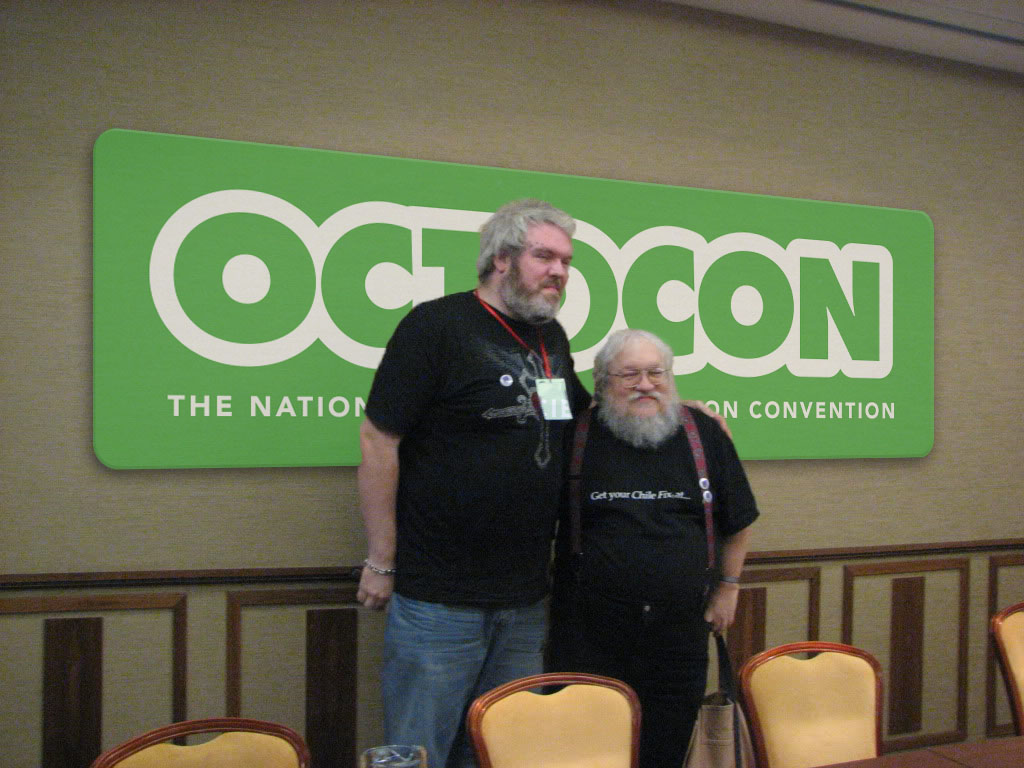
Game of Thrones actor Kristian Nairn (Hodor) and Writer George R. R. Martin at Octocon in Dublin, 17 October 2010.

The convention was initiated by members of the Irish Science Fiction Association in 1989, and named by artist Peter McCanney, who created the convention's first logo. The first convention was in the Royal Marine Hotel in Dublin in 1990 with Terry Pratchett as the first Guest of Honour. In 1995, advertised Guest of Honour Mary Gentle had to cancel at the last minute, and Kim Newman was appointed in her place.

The two years where Ireland hosted Eurocon were 1997 and 2014. In 1997 the convention was in Dublin Castle and became the largest Octocon to date. In 2014 there was no official Octocon and instead the usual organisers were involved in running Shamrokon in August.

2003 was the first year to miss holding the event. Over the years there have been a few one day conventions. The first was 1998 and the next was 2019 when Ireland hosted Dublin 2019 Worldcon. Due to the COVID-19 pandemic, 2020 was held entirely online. It remained online in 2021. The first hybrid event was held in Croke Park in 2022. In 2025 the convention was in person for 1 day and on line for the next day.

While the convention is mostly held in Dublin, 2004 saw it move to Maynooth, County Kildare, where it remained for the next 3 years before returning to Dublin again in 2008. 2026 saw the convention move to Cork. 2027 is expected to be held in Waterford.

The Golden Blasters were first awarded in 2009.

=== Conventions ===
Year	Guests of Honour	Location	Date	Ref
1990	Terry Pratchett	Royal Marine Hotel, Dun Laoghaire	13–14 October 1990	
1991	Geoff Ryman	Royal Marine Hotel, Dun Laoghaire	4–6 October 1991	
1992	Orson Scott Card	Royal Marine Hotel, Dun Laoghaire	16–18 October 1992	
1993	Storm Constantine	Royal Marine Hotel, Dun Laoghaire	30–31 October 1993	
1994	Robert Holdstock	Royal Marine Hotel, Dun Laoghaire	1–2 October 1994	
1995	Kim Newman	Royal Marine Hotel, Dun Laoghaire	14–15 October 1995	
1996	Brian Stableford	Royal Marine Hotel, Dun Laoghaire	11–13 October 1996	
1997 – Eurocon	Harry Harrison	Dublin Castle, Dublin	25–27 October 1997	
1998 - Octocon Lite	James White	Royal Marine Hotel, Dun Laoghaire	10 October 1998	
1999	Robert Rankin	Royal Marine Hotel, Dun Laoghaire	9–10 October 1999	
2000	Michael Marshall Smith	Royal Dublin Hotel, Dublin	21–22 October 2000	
2001	Anne McCaffrey	Royal Marine Hotel, Dun Laoghaire	13–14 October 2001	
2002	China Miéville	Royal Marine Hotel, Dun Laoghaire	19–20 October 2002	
2003 - no event				
2004	Tanith Lee	Glenroyal Hotel, Maynooth	16–17 October 2004	
2005	Charles Stross	Glenroyal Hotel, Maynooth	15–16 October 2005	
J. G. Jones	Glenroyal Hotel, Maynooth	14–15 October 2006		
2007	Alastair Reynolds	Glenroyal Hotel, Maynooth	13–14 October 2007	
2008	Ken MacLeod	Royal Dublin Hotel, Dublin	18–19 October 2008	
2009	Mike Carey; Fan Guest Dave Lally	Camden Court Hotel, Dublin	10–11 October 2009	
2010	George R. R. Martin	Camden Court Hotel, Dublin	16–17 October 2010	
2011	John Higgins	Camden Court Hotel, Dublin	15–16 October 2011	
2012	Liz Williams	Camden Court Hotel, Dublin	13–14 October 2012	
2013	Richard K. Morgan and Gail Simone	Camden Court Hotel, Dublin	12–13 October 2013	
2014 – No Octocon, per above & *				
2015	Maura McHugh and Emma Newman	Camden Court Hotel, Dublin	9–11 October 2015	
2016	Rhianna Pratchett, Diane Duane and Peter Morwood	Camden Court Hotel, Dublin	14–16 October 2016	
2017	Dan Abnett and Nik Vincent Abnett	Camden Court Hotel, Dublin	6-8 October 2017	
2018	Pat Cadigan and Colleen Doran	Crowne Plaza Hotel, Blanchardstown	19 - 21 October 2018	
2019 - 1-day due to August Worldcon in Dublin	Diane Duane, Peter Morwood, Ruth Frances Long, Peadar Ó Guilín	Crowne Plaza Hotel, Blanchardstown	13 October 2019	
2020	Michael Carroll (and fan GoHs Helen and Philippa Ryder)	Virtual due to pandemic	9 - 11 October 2020	
2021	No GoHs	Virtual due to pandemic	1 - 3 October 2021	
2022	Michael Carroll (and fan GoHs Helen and Philippa Ryder)	Croke Park Convention Centre, Dublin & online	15 - 16 October 2022	
2023	Sarah Rees Brennan	The Gibson Hotel, Dublin	7-8 October 2023	
2024	Ruth Frances Long	The Gibson Hotel, Dublin	5-6 October 2024	
2025	No GoH	The Maldron Hotel, Dublin and Online	11-12 October 2025	
2026	C.E. Murphy and Adrian Tchaikovsky	Clayton Hotel, Cork	3-4 October 2026	

- Shamrokon, a Eurocon, was run 22 to 24 August 2014, at the Doubletree by Hilton, Dublin, with guest authors Michael Carroll, Seanan McGuire, Andrzej Sapkowski, translator Ylva Spångberg and artist Jim Fitzpatrick. Unlike 1997, this was not an Octocon.

=== Golden Blasters ===
The Golden Blasters are the National Irish Science Fiction Awards for short science fiction, fantasy or horror films. Submissions can and have come from anywhere in the world, and the winners are selected by audience vote and a panel of judges.

The awards now include the Golden Blaster, The Silver Blaster and the award for the best script.

Year	Golden Blaster	Silver Blaster	Best Script
2009	Silent City (Director Rurairi Robinson)		
2010	Übermensch (Directed by Simon Temple and written by Daniel Poole)	The Astronomer's Sun (Written and directed by Simon Cartwright & Jessica Cope)	He Knows by Stuart Creque
2011	Hai In Mano Il Tuo Futuro! (Directed by Enrico Maria Artale)	Hai In Mano Il Tuo Futuro! (Directed by Enrico Maria Artale)	Wet Rot by Stuart Creque
2012	Shoreditch Slayer (Directed by Simon Levene)	CRYO (Directed by Luke Doolan)	This Vehicle Has Been Checked For Sleeping Children by John Burdeaux; Honourable mentions: Pet by Eoin O’Faolain and The Vox-Warrior Princess by Fiona Mustard.
2013	Locked Up (Written and directed Jane Eakin)	Sleepworking (Written and directed by Gavin Williams)	An Bean Sidhe by Eoin O'Sullivan
2014	ON/OFF (Directed by Thierry Lorenzi)	Steadfast Stanley (Directed by John Kim)	The Borders of the Imagination (Written by Benjamin A Friedman); Honourable mentions: Once A Hero by Neil Chase and The Almost Dead by Stanley B Eisenhammer
2015	C.T.R.L (Directed by Mariana Conde)	The Detectives of Noir Town (Directed by Andrew Chambers)	The Dirty Naturals: Where's my Bunny (Written by Derek Willis)
2016	The Way Back (Directed by John Carlin)	They Will All Die In Space (Directed by Javier Chillon)	Message through the Stars (Written by Vijay Varman)
2017	Einstein Rosen (Directed by Olga Osorio)	Einstein Rosen (Written by Olga Osorio)	
2019	Gryphon Animo, directed by Matthew Maloney	Gryphon Animo, directed by Matthew Maloney	Recurse (written by Lucas Vossoughi)

In 2018 it was decided to have a "Best of best" award given in place of the usual structure. The overall winner was the 2017 Einstein Rosen short film.

In 2019 the founder of the Golden Blasters, John Vaughan, stepped down from managing the award for reasons of ill health. While a new team was appointed, the Golden Blasters did not appear in the convention's schedule following the pandemic.
