= European Science Fiction Society =

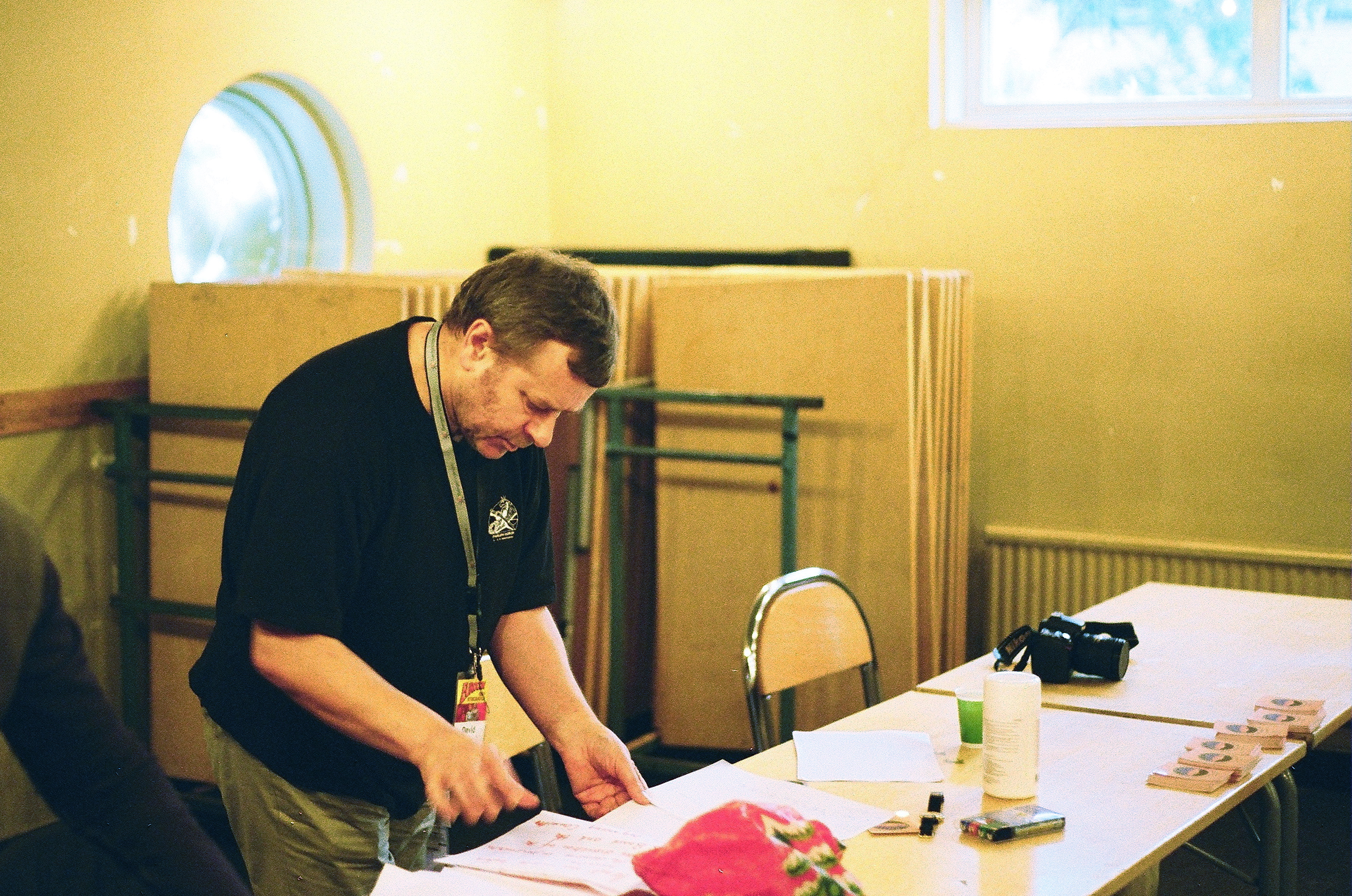
- Dave Lally, (former) chairman of the European Science Fiction Society, during the general meeting at Eurocon in Stockholm, Sweden, 2011
- Abbreviation: ESFS
- Formation: 1972 (54 years ago)
- Founded at: Trieste, Italy
- Type: Science fiction organisation
- Purpose: Promote science fiction
- Location: Europe
- Affiliations: Eurocon
- Website: esfs.info

The European Science Fiction Society (ESFS) is an international organisation of professionals and fans who are committed to promoting science fiction in Europe and European science fiction worldwide.

The organisation was founded at the first Eurocon (European Science Fiction Convention), which was held in 1972 in Trieste, Italy. Since that time, the organisation has organized Eurocons at least every two years. The organisation also administrates the European SF Awards.

The society's officers (as elected in 2025 in Mariehamn, Åland) are:

- Chair: Carolina Gómez Lagerlöf, (Sweden);
- Secretary: Joro Penchev (Bulgaria);
- Treasurer: Anouk Arnal (France);
- Vice Chair: Claudia Rapp (Germany);
- Award Administrator: Mikołaj Kowalewski (Poland).

Bridget Wilkinson served as a society officer for 25 years before standing down at the 2016 Eurocon, held in Barcelona, Spain. Before that, she ran Fans Across The World co-ordinating science fiction fans from the former Eastern Europe with their counterparts in the West.

In addition to organising Eurocons, the ESFS also holds an annual general meeting at these conventions, where representatives from different European countries vote on nominations and winners for the European SF Awards. The Awards include several categories — such as Chrysalis, Achievement, Hall of Fame and European Grand Master — reflecting both emerging and lifetime contributions to European science fiction.
