= FantLab's Book of the Year Award =

Russian awards for science fiction / fantasy works

- FantLab book of the year
- Awarded for: The best science fiction or fantasy works published during previous calendar year
- Presented by: FantLab
- First award: 2007
- Website: fantlab.ru/award86

The FantLab's book of the year award (Russian: Книга года по версии Фантлаба) are a set of awards given annually for the best science fiction or fantasy works published in Russia during previous year. The awards are named after FantLab web site.

It is organized and overseen by society of reader's registered at FantLab site, the awards are given each year. They were first given in 2007, and have been awarded every year since. Over the years that the award has been given, the categories presented have changed; currently FantLab Awards are given in 9 categories, and include works published on websites.

For lists of winners and nominees for each category, see the list of award categories below.

== Award ==
In 2007 as popularity of the site grew and when number of daily visitors reached 4 thousand a day, site decided to implement a voting system that allowed nomination of popular and best reviewed books. FantLab's Book of the Year Award is given annually for the best science fiction or fantasy works of the previous year. Works are eligible for an award if they were published in Russian in the prior calendar year. There are no written rules as to which works qualify as science fiction or fantasy, and the decision of eligibility in that regard is left up to the voters. Award winners are chosen based on vote count. The awards are split into 9 categories.

== Categories ==
Current categories
Best Translated book / Best book by foreign writer
Best Russian book / Best book by Russian writer
Best Translated Novel / Best Collection by foreign writer
Best Russian Novel / Best Collection by Russian writer
Best Translated Novella or Short Story
Best Russian Novella or Short Story
Best Anthology
Best On-line publication in Large Form
Best On-line publication in Short Form
Best Literary SF Criticism Long Form
Best Literary SF Criticism Review/Article

== Award winners & nominees 2007-2015 ==
Winners in Bold

2015

- Best Translated Novel / Best Collection by foreign writer:
  - Peter F. Hamilton, "Pandora's Star"
  - William Gibson, "The Peripheral"
  - China Miéville, "Railsea"
  - **Brandon Sanderson, "The Hero of Ages" (Russian: "Герой веков")**
  - Michael Swanwick, "The Best of Michael Swanwick"
- Best Russian Novel / Best Collection by Russian writer:
  - **H. L. Oldie, "Escape to Charge" (Russian: "Побег на рывок")**
  - Maria Galina, "Autoxons" (Russian: "Автохтоны")
  - Dmitry Glukhovsky, "Metro 2035" (Russian: "Метро 2035"
  - Alexey Pehov, "Blue Flame" (Russian: "Синее пламя")
  - Victor Pelevin, "Care-taker" (Russian: "Смотритель")
- Best Translated Novella or Short Story:
  - **Joe Abercrombie, "Tough Times all Over" (Russian: "Жить всё труднее")**
  - Scott Lynch, "A Year and a Day in Old Theradane"
  - George R. R. Martin, "The Rogue Prince, or, the King's Brother"
  - Brandon Sanderson, "Shadows for Silence in the Forests of Hell"
  - Connie Willis, "Now Showing"
- Best Russian Novella or Short Story:
  - Aleksandra Davydova, Maksim Tihomirov "In Question of Pile" (Russian: "К вопросу о сваях")
  - **Vladislav Zhenevski, "Never"" (Russian: "Никогда")**
  - Igor Krom, "Stay in Touch" (Russian: "Оставайтесь на связи")
  - Alexandr Matuxin, "Forever" (Russian: "Навсегда")
  - K.A. Terina, "Black Hole in Place of a Heart" (Russian: "Чёрная дыра вместо сердца")
- **Best Anthology**
  - Vyacheslav Bakulin, Ludmila Demina, "Bombs and Bumerangs" (Russian: "Бомбы и бумеранги")
  - **George R. R. Martin, Gardner Dozois, "Rogues" (Russian: "Негодяи")**
  - M.C. Parfenov, "Scariest Book of 2015" (Russian: "Самая страшная книга 2015")
  - Maria Artemieva "Dark Side of the Net" (Russian: "Темная сторона сети")
  - Vyacheslav Bakulin, Ludmila Demina, "Rapiers and Pinions" (Russian: "Шпаги и шестеренки")
- **Best On-line publication in Large Form**
  - **Shimun Vrochek "Rome. Legions requesting fire", (Russian: "Рим. Легионы просят огня")**
- **Best On-line publication in Small Form**
  - **Sergei Ignatiev "Chain" (Russian: "Цепочка")**
- **Best Literary SF Criticism Long Form**
  - **Alexey Karavaev "4 Stories" (Russian: "4 истории")**
- 'Best Literary SF Criticism Review/Article
  - **Vladislav Zhenevski, "Puzzle of stars: what we readi in 2014" (Russian: "Пазл из звездочек: что мы читали в 2014-м")**

2014

- Best Translated Novel / Best Collection by foreign writer:
  - Andy Weir, "The Martian"
  - Joe Abercrombie, "Red Country"
  - Neil Gaiman, "The Ocean at the End of the Lane"
  - Anthony Ryan, "Blood Song"
  - **Jacek Dukaj, "Inne piesni"**
- Best Russian Novel / Best Collection by Russian writer:
  - Mike Gelprin, "Peacemaker of 45 caliber" (Russian: "Миротворец 45-го калибра"
  - H. L. Oldie, "Pack Leader" (Russian: "Вожак")
  - Ksenia Medvedev, "Keeper for Own Brother" (Russian: "Сторож брату своему")
  - Victor Pelevin, "Love for Three Tsukerbrinas" (Russian: "Любовь к трём цукербринам")
  - **Alexey Pehov, "Cursed Bugle" (Russian: "Проклятый горн")**
- Best Translated Novella or Short Story:
  - Paolo Bacigalupi, "The Gambler"
  - Neil Gaiman, "Fortunately, the Milk..."
  - Ian McDonald, "The Tear"
  - **George R. R. Martin, "A Night at the Tarn House"**
  - Ted Chiang, "The Lifecycle of Software Objects"
- Best Russian Novella or Short Story:
  - Maria Galina, "Lute and others" (Russian: "Лютня и всё такое")
  - **Aleksandra Davydova, "Permafrost" (Russian: "Вечная мерзлота")**
  - Mike Gelprin, "Peacemaker of 45 caliber" (Russian: "Миротворец 45-го калибра"
  - Alexandr Zolotko, "Function" (Russian: "Функция")
  - Vladimir Kuznetsov, "Vanished forever in abyss under Messina…" (Russian: "Навек исчезнув в бездне под Мессиной...")
- **Best Anthology**
  - **Gardner Dozois, "The Year's Best Science Fiction: Twenty-Sixth Annual Collection"**
  - Bruce Sterling, "Mirrorshades"
  - George R. R. Martin, Gardner Dozois, "Songs of the Dying Earth: Stories in Honor of Jack Vance"
  - M.C. Parfenov, "Scariest Book of 2014" (Russian: "Самая страшная книга 2014")
  - George R. R. Martin, Gardner Dozois, "Old Mars"
- **Best On-line publication in Large Form**
  - Andrej Vasiliev, "Fayroll. Different sides" (Russian: "Файролл. Разные стороны")
  - Oksana Demchenko, "CE- Character of Earthman", (Russian: "ХЗ - характер землянина")
  - Dem Michailov "Exile: Bloody Spring", (Russian: "Изгой: Кровавая весна")
  - **Andrej Lazarchuk, Michael Uspensky "All that Djakch", (Russian: "Весь этот джакч")**
  - Karina Vran, "Ascendance. Inferno" (Russian: "Восхождение: Поступь Инферно")
- **Best On-line publication in Small Form**
  - Thomas Ligotti, "The Clown Puppet"
  - Thomas Ligotti, "Dream of a Mannikin"
  - **Robert R. McCammon "The Deep End"**
  - Elizabeth Massie, "Abed"
  - Glen Hirshberg, "Safety Clowns"

2013

- Best Translated Novel / Best Collection by foreign writer:
  - **Brandon Sanderson, "The Way of Kings"**
  - Joe Abercrombie, "Best Served Cold"
  - Stephen King, "11/22/63"
  - China Miéville, "Embassytown"
  - Patrick Rothfuss, "The Wise Man's Fear"
- Best Russian Novel / Best Collection by Russian writer:
  - **Julia Zonis, Catherine Chernyavskaya "Lord of the Mirrors" (Russian: "Хозяин зеркал")**
  - Vladimir Arenev, "Lord of the Road" (Russian: "Мастер дороги")
  - H. L. Oldie, "Wolfling" (Russian: "Волчонок")
  - Ksenia Medvedev, "Halif's Falcon" (Russian: "Ястреб халифа")
  - Nadezhda Popova, "Catcher of Men" (Russian: "Ловец человеков")
- Best Translated Novella or Short Story:
  - **Ken Liu, "Mono No Aware"**
  - Neil Gaiman, "The Truth is a Cave in the Black Mountains"
  - Neil Gaiman, "Odd and the Frost Giants"
  - Neil Gaiman, "The Man Who Forgot Ray Bradbury"
  - Joe Hill, "The Devil on the Staircase"
- Best Russian Novella or Short Story:
  - **Aleksandra Davydova, "Lights of St. Elm" (Russian: "Огни святого Эльма")**
  - Mike Gelprin, "Every civilized man"" (Russian: "Каждый цивилизованный человек")
  - Vladimir Arenev, "Dushnica" (Russian: "Душница")
  - Oleg Divov, "Objects in Mirror are Closer than they appear" (Russian:"Объекты в зеркале ближе, чем кажутся")
- **Best Anthology**
  - **Aleksandra Davydova, "Zarisovka O" (Russian: "Zарисовка О")**
  - Igor Minakov, "Zombies are Quite Here" (Russian: "А зомби здесь тихие")
  - Sergei Chekmaev "Bestiarium", (Russian: "Бестиариум")
  - Neil Gaiman, Al Sarrantonio, "Stories: All-New Tales"
  - Ellen Datlow, Terri Windling "Troll's Eye View: A Book of Villainous Tales"
- **Best On-line publication in Large Form**
  - **Olga Onojko, "Sea of Possibilities" (Russian: "Море Вероятностей")**
  - Konstantin Kostinov, "White on White" (Russian: "Белое на белом")
  - Oksana Demchenko "EC- Earthman's Collection", (Russian: "НЗ - набор землянина")
- **Best On-line publication in Small Form**
  - **Ken Liu, "The Paper Menagerie"**
  - Aleksej Vert, "G&G" (Russian: "Г&Г")
  - Anatoly Belilovsky, "Karlsson" (Russian: "Карлсон" )
- **Best Literary SF Criticism Long Form**
  - **H. L. Oldie, "Ten Temptations" (Russian: "Десять искушений" )**
  - Maria Galina, "Not Only on SF" (Russian: "Не только о фантастике")
  - Nina Demurova, "Lewis Carroll" (Russian: ""Льюис Кэрролл"" )
- **Best Literary SF Criticism Review/Article**
  - **Sergei Berezhnoi, "Bomb That Went Off Twice" (Russian: "Бомба, которая взорвалась дважды" )**
  - Sergei Berezhnoi, "Space battles of local meaning" (Russian: "Космические бои местного значения" )'
  - Nikolaj Karavaev, "Triple Life of Cordwainer Smith" (Russian: "Тройная жизнь Кордвейнера Смита")

2012

- Best Translated Novel / Best Collection by foreign writer:
  - **Terry Pratchett & Neil Gaiman, "Good Omens"**
  - Neal Stephenson, "Anathem"
  - Paolo Bacigalupi, "The Windup Girl"
  - George R. R. Martin, "A Dance with Dragons"
  - China Miéville, "Kraken"
- Best Russian Novel / Best Collection by Russian writer:
  - **Grey Ph. Green, "Cetopolis: Whales & Battleships" (Russian: Кетополис: Киты и броненосцы)**
  - H. L. Oldie, "The Cyclops" (Russian: Циклоп)
  - H. L. Oldie, "Son of Lame Alkeas" (Russian: Сын хромого Алкея)
  - Alexey Pehov, "The Golden Bonfires" (Russian: Золотые костры)
  - Peter Vorobieff, "Gorm, son of Hardecnut" (Russian: Горм, сын Хёрдакнута)
- Best Translated Novella or Short Story:
  - **George R. R. Martin, "The Mystery Knight"**
  - Dan Simmons, "The River Styx Runs Upstream"
  - Dan Simmons, "Entropy's Bed at Midnight"
  - S. M. Stirling, "Ancient Ways"
  - Robin Hobb, "The Triumph"
- Best Russian Novella or Short Story:
  - **Мария Галина, "Куриный Бог"**
  - Vera Kamsha, "White nights of Hecata" (Russian: Вера Камша «Белые ночи Гекаты)
  - Тим Скоренко, "Господин Одиночество"
  - Леонид Каганов, "Далекая гейпарадуга"
- **Best Anthology**
  - **George R. R. Martin, "Warriors"**
  - Эрик Брегис, "Темпориум"
  - Сергей Чекмаев, "Беспощадная толерантность"
  - Александра Давыдова, "Яблони на Марсе"
  - Jonathan Strahan & Marianne S. Jablon, "Wings of Fire"
- **Best On-line publication in Large Form**
  - **Ксения Медведевич, "Золотая богиня аль-Лат"**
  - Макс Далин, "Лестница из терновника. Книга третья"
  - Ирина Сыромятникова, "Магистр Разрушения"
- **Best On-line publication in Small Form**
  - **Vladimir Arenev, " Dushnica" (Russian:"Душница")**
  - Svyatoslav Loginov, "Matrena's pies" ((Russian: Матрёнины пироги)
  - Мария Галина, "Лианы, ягуары, женщина"

2011

- Best Translated Novel / Best Collection by foreign writer:
  - **Joe Abercrombie, "The Last Argument of Kings"**
  - Michael Swanwick, "The Dragons of Babel"
  - Dan Simmons, "Drood"
- Best Russian Novel / Best Collection by Russian writer:
  - **Мария Галина, "Медведки"**
  - Vadim Panov, "Last Admiral of Zagrata" (Russian: Последний адмирал Заграты)
  - H. L. Oldie, "The Exile of Oikoumene" (Russian: Изгнанница Ойкумены)
- Best Translated Novella or Short Story:
  - **Andrzej Sapkowski, "The Viper"**
  - Peter Watts, "The Island"
  - Glen Cook, "Tides Elba: A Tale of the Black Company"
- Best Russian Novella or Short Story:
  - **Svyatoslav Loginov, "Gold of Medynne" (Russian: Медынское золото)**
  - Ольга Онойко, "Лётчик и девушка"
  - Victor Pelevin, "Zenith Codex's of Al-Efesbi" (Russian: Зенитные кодексы Аль-Эфесби)
- **Best Anthology**
  - **Сергей Пальцун & Сергей Лапач, "Формула крови"**
  - Lou Anders & Jonathan Strahan, "Swords & Dark Magic"
  - Далия Трускиновская, "Феминиум"

2010

- Best Translated Novel / Best Collection by foreign writer:
  - **Patrick Rothfuss, "The Name of the Wind"**
  - Michael F. Flynn, "Eifelheim"
  - Joe Abercrombie, "Before They Are Hanged"
- Best Russian Novel / Best Collection by Russian writer:
  - **Mariam Petrosyan, "The House, In Which..." (Russian: Дом, в котором…)**
  - Maryna and Serhiy Dyachenko, "Migrant, or Brevi Finietur" (Russian: Мигрант, или Brevi finietur)
  - Дмитрий Колодан, "Время Бармаглота"
- Best Translated Novella or Short Story:
  - **Garth Nix, "Beyond the Sea Gate of the Scholar-Pirates of Sarsköe"**
  - William Hope Hodgson, "The «Shamraken» Homeward-Bounder"
  - Adam-Troy Castro, "Gunfight in Farside"
- Best Russian Novella or Short Story:
  - **Дмитрий Колодан, "Время Бармаглота"**
  - Svyatoslav Loginov, "Earth's Axel" ((Russian: Ось мира)
  - H. L. Oldie, "Goldmaster, or Ask and you shall receive" (Russian: Золотарь, или Просите, и дано будет...)
- **Best Anthology**
  - **Gardner Dozois, "The Year's Best Science Fiction: Twenty-Fifth Annual Collection"**
  - John Joseph Adams, "Wastelands: Stories of the Apocalypse"
  - Jeff VanderMeer & Ann VanderMeer, "Fast Ships, Black Sails"

2009

- Best Translated Novel / Best Collection by foreign writer:
  - **Peter Watts, "Blindsight"**
  - Neil Gaiman, "The Graveyard Book"
  - Guy Gavriel Kay, "Ysabel"
- Best Russian Novel / Best Collection by Russian writer:
  - **Мария Галина, "Малая Глуша"**
  - Alexey Pehov, "Mocking Jay" (Russian: Пересмешник)
  - Maryna and Serhiy Dyachenko, "Digital, or Brevis Est" (Russian: Цифровой, или Brevis est)
- Best Translated Novella or Short Story:
  - **Dan Simmons, "This Year's Class Picture"**
  - Scott Edelman, "Almost the Last Story by Almost the Last Man"
  - Paolo Bacigalupi, "Pump Six"
- Best Russian Novella or Short Story:
  - **Евгений Лукин, "С нами бот"**
  - Олег Дивов, "Сталин и дураки"
  - Alexey Pehov, "Ведьмин яр"
- **Best Anthology**
  - **John Joseph Adams, "The Living Dead"**
  - Kathryn Cramer & David G. Hartwell, "The Space Opera Renaissance"
  - Stephen Jones, "The Mammoth Book of Monsters"

2008

- Best Translated Novel / Best Collection by foreign writer:
  - **Dan Simmons, "The Terror"**
  - China Miéville, "The Scar"
  - Neil Gaiman, "Fragile Things"
  - Terry Pratchett, "The Truth"
  - Barry Hughart, "Bridge of Birds"
- Best Russian Novel / Best Collection by Russian writer:
  - **Maryna and Serhiy Dyachenko, "The Copper King" (Russian: Медный Король)**
  - Дмитрий Колодан, "Другая сторона"
  - H. L. Oldie, "Harpy" (Russian: Гарпия)
  - Евгений Лукин, "Бытиё наше дырчатое"
- **Best Anthology**
  - **Виктор Точинов, Наталья Резанова, "Герои. Другая реальность"**
  - Stephen Jones, "The Mammoth Book of Best New Horror, volume 17"
  - Mike Ashley, "The Mammoth Book of Sorcerer's Tales"

2007

- Best Translated book / Best book by foreign writer:
  - **George R. R. Martin, "A Feast for Crows"**
- Best Russian book / Best book by Russian writer:
  - **Maryna and Serhiy Dyachenko, "Vita Nostra"**
