= Volodymyr Arenev =

Ukrainian writer

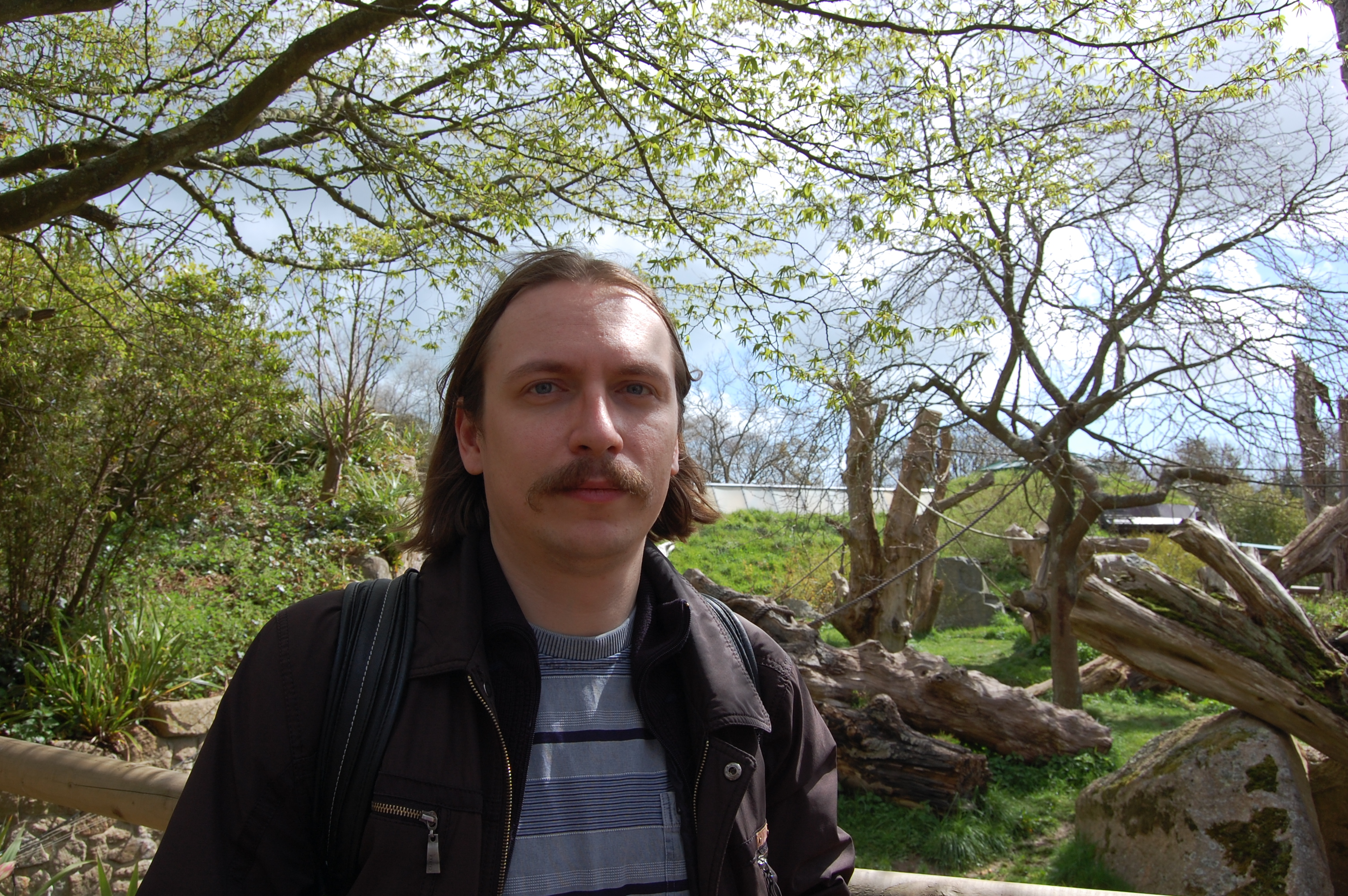
- Born: October 1, 1978 (age 47); Kyiv, Ukraine
- Occupations: writer, journalist, editor, screenwriter, translator
- Writing career
- Period: 1998 — present
- Genres: Science-fiction, Fantasy for adults and young adults

Volodymyr Arenev (Ukrainian: Володимир Арєнєв, Russian: Владимир Аренев) is a pen name of Ukrainian science fiction, fantasy award-winning writer, journalist and screenwriter Volodymyr Puziy. He writes in Russian and Ukrainian languages and resides in Kyiv, Ukraine.

== Biography ==
Volodymyr Kostiantynovych Puziy (Ukrainian: Володимир Костянтинович Пузій) was born October 1, 1978, in Kyiv. In school he was very fond of biology, attended young naturalists group at Kyiv Zoo, admired Gerald Durrell and James Herriot, and seriously engaged in keeping exotic amphibians and insects in vivarium at home. In 1995 applied to Biological faculty, but failed. For the next year Arenev worked as a sweeper at Kyiv Zoo. In 1996 he successfully applied to Institute of Journalism of Taras Shevchenko National University of Kyiv. After receiving Master’s Degree with distinction he started teaching the history of literature and numerous students’ courses on writing skills.

== Science fiction and fantasy writer ==
For the time being Arenev has 21 books published in Ukrainian and Russian. His numerous short stories and novellas have been published in Ukrainian, Russian, Polish, Lithuanian, Estonian, French and English (more than 150 publications in periodicals and anthologies)^{,}. Debuted in fiction in 1998 with science fiction short story "Guardian Angel" (Russian: Ангел-хранитель) published in the first issue "Maidan XXI" anthology.

First usage of pen-name Vladimir Arenev dates 2000, when he started a series of typical mainstream post-Tolkien fantasy. This period ended at 2005 and after a pause Arenev changed the format, working on fiction with a social narrative since 2008. Arenev’s short stories and novellas were published at such anthologies as "Best of the year" (Russian: Лучшее за год) and "New Legends" (Russian: Новые легенды) at Azbuka Publishing House (Russian: Азбука), "SF&Fantasy" (Russian: Фантастика) at AST, "Fantasy" (Russian: Фэнтези) at Eksmo, and in several magazines in Ukraine, Russia, Lithuania, Germany and Poland.

== Journalist, editor, translator ==
Under his name Volodymyr Puziy is known as awarded literary critic and book reviewer, lecturer at SF&Fantasy conventions on Literary criticism issues. Also works as a freelance journalist for newspapers and magazines in Kyiv, Moscow and Saint-Petersburg.

- 1999–2003 — an executive editor of students anthology ‘Sviatiy Volodymyr’ (Ukrainian: Святий Володимир).
- 2003–2006 — regular author at "Realnost’ Fantastiki" (Russian: Реальность фантастики) magazine, Moscow.
- 2004–present — author at "Mir Fantastiki" (Russian: Мир фантастики) magazine, Moscow, columnist at "Modern intellectual prose" section since 2010.
- 2005–2008 — supervisor of screenplay department of "Ragnesis-online" MMORPG project ("Intelligent Soft") developing the game world and coordinating screenwriters. The matherial was also used for the novel "An Affair of Honour".
- 2011–present — biographical and historical articles at "Lichnosti" (Russian: Личности) magazine, Kyiv.

Arenev also participated in editorial process of numerous fiction anthologies. Currently supervises and edits the "Dark fantasy" series of ‘Ripol-classic’ (Russian: Рипол-классик) Publishing House, Moscow. He wrote forewords and afterwords to the books of the well-known fantasy writers Maryna and Serhiy Dyachenko, H. L. Oldie, Jacek Piekara, Dmytro Skiriuk. Translated Glen Cook’s "Tides Elba" short story and Andrzej Sapkowski’s "Spanienkreuz" into Russian (2011). Translation editor of Jacek Dukaj’s short novel "Serce Mroku", Jakub Nowak’s short novel (Russian: Доминичка говорит) and Jacek Piekara’s novels about Mordimer Madderdin published in Russia.

== Literary Awards ==
Volodymyr Arenev was awarded with various literary awards in the science fiction and fantasy in the Commonwealth of Independent States and Europe. Featured awards are:

1. EuroCon (ESFS Awards) 2004 — Encouragement Award.
2. Twice nominated (shortlisted) for Debut award (for the short stories series "We, humanses" (Russian: Мы, людики) In 2003 and for the novel "All Adam’s Race" (Russian: Все племя Адамово) in 2011.
3. In 2011 have been at long list for the novel "Rings on the Ground" (Russian: Круги на земле).
4. International Ukrainian-German O. Gonchar Award for novel "Rules of the Game" (Russian: Правила игры) (2001).
5. International convent of fiction writers Star Bridge (received the award 2001, 2005 and have been nominated a number of times).
6. Alexander Belayev prize (2008).
7. "Interpresscon" Award in 2006 from the Literary criticism nomination. Also was nominated for the short novel "It Runs in his Blood" (Russian: То, что в его крови) in 2011, for the novel "Magus" (Russian: Магус) in 2007, for the short novel "Speechless Teacher" (Russian: Немой учитель) in 2003.
8. Nominated for The Marble Fawn award (Russian: Мраморный фавн) for two articles (2004) and short novel "The White Dame" (2010).
9. "Die Kleine Nordklinge" for the best short story published in Germany in Russian (2003, 2011).
10. Nominated for "Activation of the Word" Award for the novel "All Adam’s Race" (Russian: Все племя Адамово) in 2011.
11. "FantLab's Book of the Year Award, 2012", award for best on-line publication for short novel "Souluary" (Ukrainian "Душниця").
12. Nominated for FantLab's Book of the Year Award for novel "Master of the Road" (Russian: Мастер дороги) in 2013.
13. "New Horizons 2014" award for Ukrainian Edition of a short novel "Souluary" (Ukrainian: Душниця).
14. "Best creator of children’s ScienceFiction or fantasy books", Spirit of Dedication EuroCon (ESFS Awards) 2014 in Dublin, Ireland, for Ukrainian Edition of a short novel "Souluary" (Ukrainian: Душниця). Alexander Prodan also has been awarded for artwork for the book.

== List of Publications ==
=== Novels ===
- 2000 — Dragons' Despair (Russian: Отчаяние драконов)
- 2000 — Hunt for a Hero (Russian: Охота на героя)
- 2000 — Rules of the Game (Russian: Правила игры)
- 2001 — The Return of the Creator (Russian: Возвращение Создателя)
- 2001 — The Cursed Treasure (Ukrainian: Заклятый клад) The book is sometimes considered to be a novella.
- 2005 — The Juggler's Pilgrimage (Russian: Паломничество жонглера). The beginning of The Master of Heavenly Manor (Russian: Хозяин небесного зверинца) series. A working title of the second novel is "The Fate of the Juggler" (Russian: Жребий жонглера).
- 2006 — Rigs on the Ground (Russian: Круги на земле)
- 2006 — Magus (Russian: Магус)
- 2008 — An Affair of Honor (Russian: Дело чести) The first novel from "Palimpsest" (Russian: Палимпсест) series (trilogy). A working title of the second novel is Rust on the Blade (Russian: Ржавчина на клинке). Published in 2014 as Сommandant of the Dead Fortress (Russian: Комендант мертвой крепости).
- 2011 — All Adam’s Race (Russian: Все племя Адамово)
- 2013 — The Cursed Treasure (Ukrainian: Бісова душа, або Заклятий скарб). New edition with artwork. ISBN 978-966-518-633-5
- 2014 — Commandant of the Dead Fortress ISBN 978-5-17-080002-5

=== Novellas (Short novels) ===
- 2000 — "The Bookeater" (Russian: Книгоед) Joint authorship with Yuri Nikitinskiy For children.
- 2001 — "Speechless Teacher" (Russian: Немой учитель)
- 2004 — "The City of Thousand Doors" (Ukrainian: Місто Тисячі Дверей) For children.
- 2004 — "Uncle Sam's Cabin" (Russian: Хижина дядюшки Сэма)
- 2005 — "Under Blue Skies" (Russian: Под небом голубым...)
- 2006 — "Wind Never Lies" (Russian: Ветер не лжет)
- 2010 — "The White Dame" (Russian: Белая Госпожа)
- 2011 — "It Runs in his Blood" (Russian: То, что в его крови)
- 2014 — "Souluary" (Ukrainian: Душниця) ISBN 978-966-518-656-4 The title refers to words soul and ossuary. The novella describes the world where souls of dead people are still communicating with the relatives; those souls are put in balloon-shaped devices and kept in a special sacred place called souluary. The book won two ESFS Awards 2014.

=== Collections of short stories ===
- 2003 — "Devil's Soul" (Ukrainian: Бiсова душа)
- 2003 — "Lucky Coin" (Russian: Монетка на удачу)
- 2004 — "The City of Thousand Doors" (Ukrainian: Місто Тисячі Дверей) For children.
- 2005 — "Wild Lords" (Ukrainian: Дикi володарi)
- 2006 — "Speechless Teacher" (Russian: Немой учитель)
- 2009 — "Picture Me the Heaven" (Ukrainian: Зобразiть менi рай).
- 2013 — "Roads Master" (Russian: Мастер дороги)
