= FantLab =

Russian scifi/fantasy literature website

FantLab.ru
- FantLab.ru
- Website type: Bibliographic database, forum.
- Available in: Russian
- Creator: Aleksey Lvov
- Website: fantlab.ru
- Commercial: No
- Registration: Optional
- Current status: Online

Laboratoria Fantastiki, or FantLab (Russian: Лаборатория фантастики, "speculative fiction laboratory"), is a Russian website dedicated to science fiction and fantasy literature. It was founded in 2004 by Aleksey Lvov.

== Content ==
The website contains an extensive database of books, annotations, and reviews. Unregistered users have access to author pages, ratings, news and awards. If users sign up, they can review and rate books, generate reading lists. They can also create their own bookshelves and publish articles.

Aleksey Lvov states: "Each author’s page has a biography completed with photos and bibliography. Bibliography is a compiled list of known published and unpublished works, derived from multiple sources by comparisons and additions that characterize its reliability." Users can make suggestions about additions, but these are incorporated onle after vetting by the adiministrators.

In June 2026, the database of the site contained nearly 786,000 works by nearly 5,000 authors.

Fantlab calls its mission:

- To compile bibliographies for any author writing in Science Fiction or Fantasy genres, complete with maximum information about the author, and their biography, including awards and nominations.
- Fair rating for books and authors based on reader votes and book reviews.
- Recommended titles list, based on individual profiling.
- Classification system for books and titles.
- Publishers plans, rumors and gossip.
- Special awards and recognition
- Personal Articles published by Authors
- User forums where literature related interests can be discussed
- FantLab is not an electronic library, that's why the texts of literary works can not be downloaded.

== Features ==
=== Author's pages ===
Collected information for Russian and non-Russian writers is presented on Author's pages. Each author's page will have biography completed with photos and bibliography. Bibliography is a compiled list of known published and unpublished works, derived from multiple sources by comparisons and additions that characterize its reliability. All author's works are categorized into cycles, series and epics. Each will have publishing editions information along with edition's detail. Each item in bibliography displays average rating, count of readers and number of reviews. Any title's page reflects number of people who read and rated it, an average rating, annotation, comments or synopsis, listing of parent series, epics, collections or anthologies and awards where applicable. Title's page will also contain any available information for published editions, including cover images, sorted by year and divided between Russian and non-Russian editions.

== Criticism ==
Arkady Rukh, a columnist for the magazine "If", noted that the quality of the portal's content, filled according to Web 2.0 principles, is often of poor sort and gave several examples of unsuccessful formulations reminiscent of school essays. They concerned both user reviews (moderated post factum, according to the site's rules and the assessments of other users), and pre-moderated texts of the site - user annotations to books, etc.

=== Awards and recognition pages ===
FantLab tracks all of notable international literary awards such as Locus Award, Hugo Award, Pulitzer, World Fantasy Award and others. In 2007, as popularity of the site grew and number of daily visitors reached approximately 4,000 a day, Fantlab decided to implement a voting system that allowed nomination of popular and best reviewed books, this resulted in FantLab's Book of the Year Award. It is given annually for the best science fiction or fantasy works of the previous year.

=== Recommendations ===
Recommendations are a list of titles suggested for reading. Fantlab's recommendation system prognoses how reader will feel about an unread title. To get it, think-alike ratings and titles are analyzed, averaged in weight measures of equal measures of likeness. Resulting recommendations are based on one or more similar ratings. On recommendations page you will see maximum of 3 series, 10 novels, and 10 short stories that reader is most likely to like.

=== Rating system ===
System creates ratings of writers and works based on readers ratings. Ratings will be derived by average reader rating of the title and calculated by a complex statistical correlation formulas.

=== Invisible connections ===
Invisible Connections are a result of correlation analysis based on rated titles. When a user is registered, this section will display pairs of users with highest positive (think-alikes) and lowest negative (antipodes) coefficient of correlation.

=== Author's journal ===
Fantlab is also an online magazine, published on the Internet through bulletin board system. Fantlab's writers journal includes various news, announcements, reviews and articles. Authors publish their works through their blogs. Subscribers of the blogs are notified of new publications. All specialty blog 'Columns' are administered by an individual editorial panel. Any registered of FantLab user can create a blog column and publish their work. Among authors currently publishing their work on FantLab are well-known writers and journalists like, Vadim Panov, Alexey Pehov, Vladimir Puziy, and many others.

== Awards ==
- In 2009, site received "Mech Fantastiki" (Russian: Меч фантастики) award on a "Strannik" (Russian: Странник) congress.
- In 2010, site received a prize "the Internet-Roscon" (Russian: Интернет-Роскон) on a Roscon convent.
- In 2010, site was nominated on Eurocon prize for best magazines.
- In 2011, site won Eurocon prize for best magazines.

== See also ==
- Russian science fiction and fantasy
