= Vladimir Kolebin =

Russian serial killer

- Born: Vladimir Alekseevich Kolebin; 1957 (age 68–69); Krasnoyarsk Krai, RSFSR
- Other names: "The Rybinsky Maniac" "The Krasnoyarsk Cleaner" "Quiet Vladimir"
- Conviction: Murder x6
- Penalty: 19 years imprisonment

Details
- Victims: 6
- Span of crimes: 1999–2014
- Country: Russia
- State: Krasnoyarsk
- Date apprehended: May 2014

Vladimir Alekseevich Kolebin (Russian: Владимир Алексеевич Колебин; born 1957), known as The Rybinsky Maniac (Russian: Рыбинский маньяк), is a Russian serial killer who committed six murders in the village of Rybnoye, Krasnoyarsk Krai, from 1999 to 2014. Arrested after his final murder, he would later be convicted and sentenced to 19 years imprisonment.

== Early life ==
Very little is known about Kolebin's early life. Born in 1957 in Krasnoyarsk Krai, he grew up in a poor family with several brothers and sisters. Throughout his childhood, the young Kolebin spent most of his time on the street and started committing small-time crimes at age 14.

In the mid-1990s, after being released from another prison stint, Kolebin moved to Rybnoye, where his sister and brother lived. Soon afterwards, he got a job as a watchman at a local Agricultural Technical School and began living in the home of a local woman named Nina Reshetnikova.

== Murders ==
On 15 July 1999, Kolebin was on night duty when he was attacked by a group of robbers and shot in the right shoulder, for which he had to be treated in a hospital. After being discharged, he learned that the attack was carried out by a local gang led by a man surnamed Masyutin, almost all of whom were later arrested and convicted. However, the man who organized the robbery—a local businessman surnamed Gruzdev—remained at large and soon began threatening Kolebin. Because of this, Kolebin decided that he would kill him.

In order to do so, he planned to set fire to the summer kitchen in Gruzdev's, lure him out, and shoot him. At around 3 AM on 15 October, Kolebin armed himself with a shotgun loaded with homemade buckshot and a can of gasoline, then woke up Reshetnikova and demanded that she come with him. On the way to Gruzdev's house, he ordered her to hide under a bridge over the river and wait for him to come back. Upon reaching the summer kitchen, Kolebin poured the gasoline and lubricants on one of the walls but did not set fire to it; instead, he threw a stone in the direction of Gruzdev's dog, which started barking. About three or four minutes later, Gruzdev came out on the porch and turned on the light. Kolebin, who had positioned himself outside a fence about 2.5 metres away, shot him once and killed him on the spot. Upon doing so, Kolebin returned to Reshetnikova, and then the pair fled the area, leaving the gasoline can and lubricant behind. He later burned the clothes he was wearing in the oven.

Kolebin's next murder occurred in February 2000, with his victim being his nephew, Sergey Godunov. Godunov was a schizophrenic who was periodically treated at psychiatric hospitals and supposedly improved his mental health, but after some time, he started to attack people with an axe. Among the people he attacked was his own mother, Alexandra Godunova, Kolebin's sister. Angered by his nephew's actions, Kolebin lured Sergey to his house under the pretence of drinking alcohol, where he hacked him to death with an axe and then buried the corpse in a cattle pen. Reshetnikova was present at the murder and later helped Kolebin with the burial.

A few months later, in May, Kolebin murdered Reshetnikova's brother, Andrei Ivashchenko, a homeless alcoholic who periodically sold his sister's belongings to pay for booze. Suspecting Ivashchenko of stealing and then selling something that belonged to him, Kolebin had an argument with the man, after which he decided to kill him. He eventually lured Ivashchenko into the forest under the guise of picking ramsons and drinking alcohol, with Reshetnikova accompanying both. The day before the murder, Kolebin prepared a shotgun with homemade buckshot, a shovel, and an inflatable boat, then travelled by motorcycle to the riverbank, where he inflated the boat and crossed to the opposite bank, where he placed the items in a cache. In the early morning, he, together with Reshetnikova and Ivashchenko, went to the riverbank with the hidden cache and started picking ramsons there. After waiting long enough for Ivashchenko to become very drunk, Kolebin went to the cache, picked up the shotgun, and then shot Ivashchenko in the head from 8–10 metres away. Kolebin then buried Ivashchenko's body in a nearby shallow grave, placing a bag with ramson on his head and then filling the rest with dirt. Like with the previous victim, Reshetnikova was present at the crime scene.

In the late 2000s, Kolebin began having problems with self-control and exhibited signs of mental illness. Due to his increased impulsivity, conflicts soon arose between him and Reshetnikova, who eventually left him. Kolebin then moved in with another woman in Rybnoye, Elena Nikitina, through whom he became acquainted with a prostitute surnamed Silina. Sometime in 2009, Kolebin began suspecting that Silina had stolen a tape recorder from his house, and on 31 December, while the trio were drinking together, an argument emerged in which he and Nikitina brought up the tape recorder. Silina denied stealing it, upon which an angered Kolebin went to the yard to get a rope. He then returned, snuck up behind Silina while she was still arguing with Nikitina, and then strangled her. Kolebin later claimed that the whole ordeal took at least five minutes, and in order to cover up their traces, he and Nikitina undressed Silina, burned her clothes in the stove, and then dragged the body to the vegetable garden, where they buried it. A few days later, Kolebin dug up the corpse and took it on a sledge to a field outside Rybnoye, where he dismembered it with an axe and buried the scattered remains in the snow. One night in the spring of 2010, he returned to the place where he had hidden Silina's remains but was unable to locate the head and limbs. Nikitina, who was present at the crime scene, did not report the murder to the police.

In the summer of 2013, Kolebin killed Nikitina, as he considered her too defiant. On the day of the murder, she woke him up at 5:30 AM and started arguing with him over something, causing Kolebin to hit her with an electric kettle. This caused Nikitina's eyebrow to split, for which she went to take a shower. While she was in the shower, Kolebin took a shotgun he had hidden in the dog kennel, went to the shower, and shot Nikitina in the back. He would later claim that she did not die from the initial shot, so he threw her on the ground face up, pushed her with his right hand on her right shoulder, sat on top of her, and started strangling her, wrapping his arms around her neck and squeezing her with force. When Nikitina stopped moving and breathing, he returned to the house, took a kitchen knife, and returned to the shower, whereupon he stabbed the body once in the left side of the chest. Kolebin then buried the body in his yard, planted a flower bed over it, and placed bricks that resembled the shape of a cross. In order to give himself an alibi, he wrote a note pretending to be Nikitina and claimed that she had gone to work in another city to pay alimony for her daughter, and later assisted the police in the search for the woman.

In early 2014, Kolebin committed his last murder, killing a local named Nikolai Ivanov. Kolebin claimed that on the day of the murder, Ivanov's drunken wife, whom he had supplied with alcohol, came to him and shortly after fell asleep. About 10 minutes later, an enraged Ivanov burst into Kolebin's house, finding his wife asleep, after which he began beating her. Kolebin stood up for her, who managed to escape from the house, and then offered Ivanov a drink. However, Ivanov instead grabbed a knife and began threatening Kolebin. Kolebin later claimed that he attempted to calm the man down, but he continued to walk towards him with the knife. In that moment, he grabbed his shotgun from the nearby veranda and shot Ivanov. After hiding the shotgun in a hiding space in the wall, Kolebin dragged the corpse into the street, after which he called Reshetnikova and asked her to bring him a makeshift sledge that he had previously made from a gasoline can. Reshetnikova brought him the sledge and helped Kolebin take Ivanov's corpse to a field behind the house, where Kolebin buried it in the snow.

== Arrest and investigation ==
Kolebin quickly came under suspicion after Ivanov's wife, Lyudmila, contacted the police and reported that her husband had disappeared and that she had last seen him at Kolebin's house. During the search for Ivanov, his son and a local resident found a path near Kolebin's house, which led to the discovery of the body. Ivanov's murder was investigated by Evgeny Osadchiy, an investigator from the Krasnoyarsk Krai Investigation Committee, who, in the course of interviewing Ivanov's relatives and friends, found out that multiple people had disappeared in the village over the years, all of them related to Kolebin in some way.

In the summer of 2014, while searching Kolebin's property, a cache was discovered in the dog kennel where a shotgun—the murder weapon—was located. Suspecting that the flower bed in the yard might have another hidden cache or other incriminating evidence, police officers excavated it, only to find Nikitina's remains. Shortly afterwards, Kolebin was arrested and interrogated, and after initially denying responsibility, he later admitted to all six of the murders and began cooperating with the investigators. He described the circumstances of each murder in detail, and over the following months, Kolebin took part in investigative experiments to verify his claims. A forensic ballistic examination confirmed that Gruzdev, Ivashchenko, Nikitina, and Ivanov had been killed with the homemade buckshot that fit Kolebin's smoothbore shotgun. At the same time, Reshetnikova admitted that she was present in at least three of the murders and even assisted Kolebin, but made a deal with prosecutors to testify against him in exchange for immunity from prosecution.

Eventually, using the testimony from Kolebin and Reshetnikova, the investigators found the remains of Godunov and Silina. Autopsy reports confirmed that they had been killed in the manner later described by both Kolebin and Reshetnikova. When questioned as to why she never contacted police about any of the murders, Reshetnikova claimed that she was afraid that Kolebin would kill her if she attempted to do so.

After the criminal case was sent to court, Kolebin was transferred to a psychiatric clinic for a forensic psychiatric examination. The results showed that he was indeed sane but suffered from an organic personality disorder brought on by brain injuries and his alcohol abuse. Despite this, it was ruled that he was sane to stand trial, as his abnormalities did not prevent him from distinguishing between right and wrong.

== Trial and imprisonment ==
Kolebin's trial began in 2015, and in June of that year, he was convicted of the six murders and sentenced to 19 years imprisonment. He managed to avoid a life sentence due to several mitigating factors, including his confession, admission of guilt, active cooperation with law enforcement, and his advanced age. As part of her deal with prosecutors, Reshetnikova was not prosecuted.

== In the media and culture ==
=== Television ===
- "In A Quiet Pool" (Russian: В тихом омуте) from the documentary series "On the Trail of a Monster" (Russian: По следу монстра)

=== Books ===
- Antoine Casse and Irina Kapitanova (2023). The phenomenon of Russian maniacs. The first large-scale study of maniacs and serial killers from the times of tsarism, the USSR and the Russian Federation (Russian: Феномен российских маньяков. Первое масштабное исследование маньяков и серийных убийц времен царизма, СССР и РФ), Eksmo, ISBN 5046081180

== See also ==
- List of Russian serial killers
