= Andriy Valentynov =

Ukrainian science fiction/fantasy author

Andrey Valentinovich Shmalko / Andriy Valentynovych Shmalko
- Андрей Валентинович Шмалько
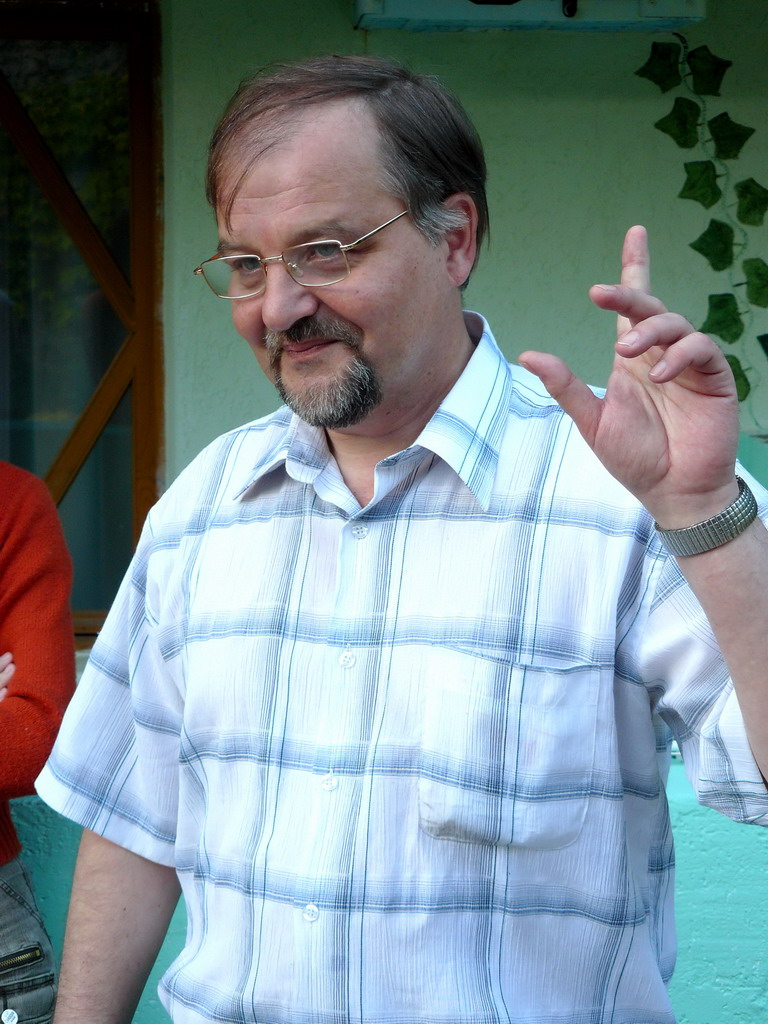
- Andrey Valentinov at the Parthenit Writing Seminar in 2010
- Born: March 18, 1958 (age 68); Kharkiv, Soviet Ukraine
- Citizenship: Ukraine
- Education: PhD in History
- Alma mater: Kharkiv National University
- Occupations: Novelist; historian; archaeologist
- Writing career
- Pen name: Andrey Valentinov
- Language: Russian
- Years active: 1995–present
- Period: 1995–2014
- Genres: science fiction, fantasy, alternate history, cryptohistory
- Subjects: world history, alternate history, cryptohistory, archaeology, noosphere, lonely honourable heroes fighting against the heartless state system or/and supernatural evil forces
- Notable awards: “Start” (1997), “Golden Duke” (1997), “Golden Caduceus” (2000), Best Author (Eurocon 2013)

Andriy Valentynov / Andrey Valentinov (Ukrainian: Андрій Валентинов, Russian: Андрей Валентинов; born March 18, 1958) is the pen name of a Ukrainian Russian-speaking science/fantasy fiction writer Andriy Valentynovych Shmalko. Valentinov is a distinguished Ukrainian historian and archaeologist and works as an associate professor at Ukrainian studies department of Kharkiv National University. He resides in Kharkiv, Ukraine, and writes in Russian. Valentinov collaborates with other Russophone Ukrainian writers, such as H. L. Oldie and Marina and Sergey Dyachenko.

Valentinov's genre is often defined as cryptohistory. He is the author of 40 novels, about 50 stories and more than 60 essays about the problems of contemporary speculative literature. He has 164 science fiction and fantasy literary awards. At Eurocon 2013 in Kyiv, the European Science Fiction Society named Valentinov Europe's best writer of 2013.

Valentinov resides and works from Kharkiv, Ukraine. Valentinov has often collaborates with other Ukrainian-born Russophone writers, such as H. L. Oldie and Marina and Sergey Dyachenko.

== Biography ==
Andriy Shmalko was born in Kharkiv, Soviet Ukraine, on March 18, 1958. He began writing poetry in 1970, and wrote his first novel while at school. His first pen name was Alexander Nexø. From 1978 till early 2000s he was participating in different archaeological expeditions exploring the sites of Khazar culture, Scythian burial mounds, Genoese castle and especially his favourite Chersonesus, an ancient Greek colony founded approximately 2,500 years ago in the south-western part of the Crimean Peninsula.

In 1980 he graduated from Kharkiv National University and became a school teacher of history. From 1982 till 1985 he was a post-graduate student at the Department of Ancient and Medieval History of Kharkiv National University. In 1985 he defended his PhD dissertation in Ancient History, Roman Policy in the Southern Black Sea Region in the 1st Century BC. From 1985 to 1992 he taught history at Kharkiv University of Arts, also known as the Kharkiv Conservatory.

In 1992 he finished his novel The Oversteps, which was published in 1995 under the pen name of Andrey Valentinov.

Valentinov is married.

== Main Images and Motifs ==
Valentinov creates his fictional world with the help of the repeating themes, images and motifs. One of them is about the people or race of Dhars (other names: Dars, Dergs, Logres and Chugs; Russian: дхары, дары, дэрги, логры, чуги). The etymology of their names might be Aryan (Dhars or Dars, compare with the Slavic dar – gift, talent), Eastern (Dergs), Celtic (Logres, also Logris or Loegria is the name of King Arthur's realm) or Slavic (chugs as diminutive for chugaisters or chugasters, kind wood goblins for Western Ukrainians living in the Carpathians). According to Valentinov, they are ambiguous creatures: half human, half bearlike, whose origin is very ancient and mysterious. The Dhars live in different places of the world and are endangered because of many enemies, from ignorant cruel people to the evil forces. They keep ancient secret knowledge and have psychic abilities. They usually look like humans, but some of them can transform into werebears. The Dhars might be the descendants of fallen angels and human females. Valentinov suggests that King Arthur whose name meant “bear” was one of them. They are presented in many Valentinov's books, especially in the Logrian series and The Eye of Power Series.

== Bibliography ==
=== Novels and Series ===
==== Mythological, Heroic and Epic Fantasy ====
Mycenaean Series (Russian: Микенский цикл)
The events take place in Ancient Greece.

- 1997 Grey Kite (Russian: «Серый коршун»)
- 2000-2001 Diomedes, the Son of Tydeus (Russian: «Диомед, сын Тидея»)

Oriya Cycle (Russian: Цикл «Ория»)
The historical and mythological fantasy based on the Eastern European history of the Migration Period.

- 1997 Violators of Equilibrium (Russian: «Нарушители равновесия»)
- 1997 If the Death Wakes (Russian: «Если смерть проснётся»)
- 2000 Seal on Your Heart (Russian: «Печать на сердце твоём»)
- 2000 … Taller Than the Linchpin (Russian: «...выше тележной чеки»)

==== Cryptohistory, Heroic Fantasy, Magic Realism and Mysticism ====
The Eye of Power Series (Russian: цикл «Око силы»)
The famous cycle is based on the Russian history of the 20th century.

1996 The first trilogy (1920-1921):

- 1. Chelkel Volunteers (Russian: «Волонтёры Челкеля»)
- 2. The Guardian of The Wound (Russian: «Страж Раны»)
- 3. The Light Bearer (Russian: «Несущий Свет»)

1997 The second trilogy (1937-1938):

- 1. You Who Is Tired of Hatred (Russian: «Ты, уставший ненавидеть»)
- 2. It Does Not Hurt Me (Russian: «Мне не больно»)
- 3. Orpheus and Nike (Russian: «Орфей и Ника»)

1995-1997 The third trilogy (1991-1992):

- 1. The Oversteps (Russian: «Преступившие»)
- 2. The Challenge (Russian: «Вызов»)
- 3. The Cohort (Russian: «Когорта»)

2010-2011 The fourth trilogy (1924):

- 1. Tsar Space (Russian: «Царь-Космос»)
- 2. General March (Russian: «Генерал-Марш»)
- 3. Wolfhound Century (Russian: «Век-волкодав»)

The Logres (Russian: Логры)

- 1997 Auvergne Cleric (Russian: «Овернский клирик») (The setting is France of the 12th century)
- 1997 Deserter (Russian: «Дезертир») (The times of the French Revolution are described)
- 2000 The Heavens Are Rejoicing (Russian: «Небеса ликуют») (Italy and Ukraine of the middle of the 17th century are presented)
- 2001 Hola (Russian: «Ола») (The events take place in Spain in the 15th century)

==== Fantasy and Magic Realism ====
1998 The Boundary (Russian: «Рубеж»; in collaboration with Henry Lion Oldie and Marina and Sergey Dyachenko).
The alternative fantasy world, fictional Gogol’s Ukraine of the 16-18th centuries and the Cabbalistic cosmogony are presented.

- Book 1: Orphans Cost a Lot in Winter (Russian: «Зимою сироты в цене»)
- Book 2: The Time to Break Rules (Russian: «Время нарушать запреты»)

Spartacus Series (Russian: Спартаковский цикл)
The history of Rome in the 1st century BC and especially the slave uprising are analyzed from the alternative perspective

- 2002 Spartacus (Russian: «Спартак»)
- 2006 The Angel of Spartacus (Russian: «Ангел Спартака»)

==== Historical Prose ====
- 2000 The Phlegethon (Russian: «Флегетон») (The tragic events of the Civil War in Russia in the Crimea are described).
- 2002 Canis Major Constellation (Russian: «Созвездие Пса») (The activities of the archaeological expedition in Chersonesus, the Crimea, are presented).

==== Magic Realism, City Fantasy and Biblical Motifs ====
Dilogy 1999 We Are to Live Here (Russian: «Нам здесь жить», written in collaboration with Henry Lion Oldie):

- Armageddon Happened Yesterday (Russian: «Армагеддон был вчера»)
- Blood is Drunk From The Cupped Hands (Russian: «Кровь пьют руками»)

The dystopian events take place in the post-apocalyptic City that resembles Kharkiv, Ukraine, the native city of the authors.

2006 Shooter (Russian: «Тирмен», written in collaboration with Henry Lion Oldie)
Modern Kharkiv, Ukraine, and the events in different countries dated from 1922 till the present time are given through the lenses of the Shooters that are the Knights of the Grand Dame with scythe.

2013 Fortress Of My Soul (Russian: «Крепость души моей», written in collaboration with Henry Lion Oldie)
The setting resembles the dilogy We Are to Live Here. The realities of modern City and the Old Testament are intermingled and interconnected.

- Birthright (Russian: «Право первородства»)
- Nine Days (Russian: «Девять дней»)
- Dawn of Sodom (Russian: «Заря над Содомом»)

==== Horror and Mysticism ====
2005 The Pentacle (Russian: «Пентакль»): the novel-cycle of 30 short stories, written in collaboration with Henry Lion Oldie and Marina and Sergey Dyachenko — Best novel award at the festival "Star Bridge" (Kharkiv, Ukraine, 2005).
The setting is primarily mystic Ukraine of different times.

==== Speculative Philosophical and Psychological Fiction (Noosphere Cycle) ====
The books of this cycle are based on the idea that there is a parallel universal reality made by our thoughts and dreams named Noosphere or Hypnosphere that is open for some people under some circumstances and allows them to live after death, to travel through time and place and to change the real world where we live.

- 2003 Sphere (Russian: «Сфера») (The introductory book of the cycle lifting the veil of our unconscious)
- 2005 Omega (Russian: «Омега») (The protagonist lives in three parallel realities. The modern war in the Crimea is described)
- 2006 Dimon (Russian: «Даймон») (Two main plot lines are about Africa of the middle of the 19th century and Ukraine of the early 2000s)
- 2007 Captain Philibert (Russian: «Капитан Филибер») (The protagonist who is lethally ill in the real world of contemporary Ukraine finds his second life in the reality of the Civil War in Russia (1917-1922) and changes the course of history)
- 2013 Noir (Russian: «Нуар») (World War II is described from the perspective of the former Russian White Guard officer. The events are set primarily in Morocco).

==== Chronoopera and Steampunk ====
2011 Alumen (Russian: «Алюмен», written in collaboration with Henry Lion Oldie)
European technical progress of the 18-19th centuries is presented from the perspective of the metaphysical struggle between the rational scientific and irrational occult forces.

- 2008 Book 1: The Mechanism of Time (Russian: «Механизм Времени»)
- 2009 Book 2: The Mechanism of Space (Russian: «Механизм Пространства»)
- 2009 Book 3: The Mechanism of Life (Russian: «Механизм Жизни»)

=== Alternate History ===
2017-2018 Argentina Series (Russian: «Аргентина»)

The first trilogy (1936):

- 2017 Book 1: Quentin (Russian: «Квентин»)
- 2017 Book 2: Krabat (Russian: «Крабат»)
- 2017 Book 3: Cage (Russian: «Кейдж»)

The second trilogy (1937):

- 2018 Book 1: Lounge (Russian: «Лонжа»)
- 2018 Book 2: Leichtweiss (Russian: «Лехтвейс»)
- 2018 Book 3: Loki (Russian: «Локи»)

=== Black Humour and Postmodern Detective Stories and Novellas ===
The Collective Authors’ Cycle Commissioner Fuhe’s Adventures (Russian: «Похождения комиссара Фухе»)

- 1996 “Golden Goddess”
- 2001 “A Big Shake”
- 1996 “Christmas Story” (in collaboration with Sergey Kaplin)
- 1996 “The Great Missing”
- 1996 “Fuhe’s Methods”
- 2001 “Commissioner Fuhe’s Testament”
- 2001 “Commissioner Fuhe’s Dissertation”
- 2001 “Tour of Duty”
- 2001 “Meeting”
- 2001 “A Water Pipe”
- 2001 “Campaign”
- 2001 “A Little Present”
- 2001 “My Best Wishes!”
- 2001 “Nutcase”
- 2001 “Wholesale”
- 2002 “Jubilee”
- 1996 “Justice”

=== Poetry ===
1997 Catching the Wind (Russian: «Ловля ветра») (collection)
