= Good Omens =

1990 novel by Terry Pratchett and Neil Gaiman

- First edition cover
- Author: Terry Pratchett; Neil Gaiman
- Language: English
- Genre: Horror; fantasy; comedy; Apocalyptic Fiction; supernatural; Dark Fantasy
- Publisher: Gollancz (UK); Workman (US)
- Publication date: 10 May 1990
- Publication place: United Kingdom
- Media type: Print (hardcover, paperback)
- Pages: 288
- ISBN: 0-575-04800-X
- OCLC: 21299949

Good Omens: The Nice and Accurate Prophecies of Agnes Nutter, Witch is a 1990 novel written by the English authors Terry Pratchett and Neil Gaiman.

The book is a comedy about the birth of the son of Satan and the coming of the End Times. The premise is similar to that of Richard Donner's 1976 supernatural horror film The Omen, with the main character, Adam Young, standing in as a comic version of Damian, the evil child Antichrist in the film. There are attempts by the angel Aziraphale and the demon Crowley to sabotage the coming of the end times, having grown accustomed to their comfortable surroundings in England. One subplot features a mix-up at the small country hospital on the day of birth and the growth of the Antichrist, Adam, who grows up with the wrong family, in a village in the wrong country. Another subplot concerns the summoning of the Four Horsemen of the Apocalypse. In 2003, the novel was listed at number 68 on the BBC's survey the Big Read.

== Plot summary ==
Aziraphale, an angel (originally a guardian of the Eastern Gate of Eden), and Crowley, a demon (originally the serpent who tempted Eve), have lived on Earth since its creation. Over the millennia, they have formed an odd relationship and taken a liking to humanity. One night, the forces of Hell deliver the infant Antichrist to Crowley, with instructions to swap him with the son of an American diplomat stationed in Britain. Crowley realizes this means that the Apocalypse is coming and persuades Aziraphale to help him prevent it. Together, they decide to influence the Antichrist's upbringing by posing as a nanny and a gardener so that the child can never really decide between Good and Evil.

However, due to several misunderstandings at the hospital, the real Antichrist is actually another boy, Adam Young, who grows up unnoticed in idyllic Lower Tadfield, Oxfordshire, together with his three close friends – Pepper, Wensleydale and Brian. As the foretold end of the world nears, Adam begins to unknowingly use his reality-warping powers, changing the world to fit his vision of how things ought to be, such as raising the lost continent of Atlantis after reading about it in a conspiracy theory magazine, summoning UFOs after talking to his friends about aliens, and having the Amazon rainforest reclaim land lost to urban development. In the meantime, the Four Horsemen of the Apocalypse assemble: War (a war correspondent), Famine (a dietician and fast-food tycoon), Pollution (Pestilence having retired after the discovery of penicillin) and Death (a biker).

Aziraphale and Crowley realize their mistake and begin a frantic search for the Antichrist. Also looking for the boy is Anathema Device, a witch who is trying to prevent the Apocalypse as predicted by her ancestor, Agnes Nutter. Agnes's prophecies are perfectly accurate, but many are so cryptic and specific as to be nearly useless, save to the time, place and person they're meant for. Anathema is joined by Newton Pulsifer, sole recruit of the Witchfinder Army (and descendent of Thou-Shall-Not-Commit-Adultery Pulsifer, the Witchfinder who burnt Agnes Nutter at the stake), who has been sent to investigate the strange phenomena around Tadfield by Sergeant Shadwell, the Army's only other member. Everyone, including Shadwell's medium neighbour, Madame Tracy, converges at Tadfield Military Base, where the Four Horsemen are starting a world-ending nuclear war by tampering with the computer systems.

Amid the increasing chaos, Adam is overcome with visions of greatness and attempts to split the world between his gang. When his friends react with horror at what he is becoming, Adam comes to his senses and decides to stop the Apocalypse. He and his friends make their way to the military base and defeat three of the Four Horsemen, with Death accepting defeat and vanishing. A furious Satan starts to ascend to Earth, but Adam, having heard that "his father is coming", twists reality so that his human adoptive father arrives instead, then modifies everyone's memories of recent events.

With Armageddon averted, Crowley and Aziraphale muse that this was God's plan all along and speculate that the real apocalyptic conflict will be between humanity and the combined forces of Heaven and Hell. Madame Tracy marries Sergeant Shadwell, effectively disbanding the Witchfinder Army. Anathema begins a relationship with Newton and receives a second book of Agnes's prophecies, but decides not to open it, and burns it instead. Finally, Adam uses his powers to evade his father's grounding and steal a pocketful of apples from a gnarled old tree.

== Characters ==
=== Supernatural Beings ===
- God, the creator of the universe and all things in it. The ineffable Being.
- Metatron, the Voice of God, but an entity in their own right.
- Aziraphale, joint main character of the novel with Crowley. He is also a rare book dealer.
- Crowley, joint main character of the novel with Aziraphale. He is an angel who did not so much "Fall" as "Saunter Vaguely Downwards."
- Satan, the original Fallen; he led the rebellion against Heaven and was responsible for forming Hell (as an organization, if not a place) when the rebel angels were made to Fall.
- Beelzebub, Prince of Hell and leader of its forces.
- Hastur, Duke of Hell and a very traditional demon who spends very little time on Earth.
- Ligur, another Duke of Hell. Ligur is destroyed by a bucket of Holy Water which was placed above Crowley's door in defense against him and Hastur.
- Dagon, Lord of the Files and Master of Torments. Dagon contacts Crowley through his radio.
- Adam Young, the Antichrist. Adversary, Destroyer of Kings, Angel of the Bottomless Pit, Great Beast that is called Dragon, Prince of this World, Father of Lies, Spawn of Satan, Lord of Darkness. The Leader of The Them.

=== Humans ===
- Agnes Nutter, a witch from the 17th century. She wrote The Nice and Accurate Prophecies of Agnes Nutter, Witch.
- Anathema Device, a practical occultist and Agnes' descendant.
- Newton Pulsifer, a wages clerk who becomes a Witchfinder Private.
- Shadwell, the last remaining Sergeant of the Witchfinder Army, who hires Newt.
- Madame Tracy, Painted Jezebel and Medium.
- Pepper (Pippin Galadriel Moonchild), member of The Them.
- Brian, member of The Them.
- Wensleydale, member of The Them.
- Warlock Dowling, a boy that is thought to be the Antichrist by Aziraphale and Crowley, thanks to a mix-up.
- Thou-Shalt-Not-Commit-Adultery Pulsifer, Newt's ancestor and the witchfinder who burned Agnes.
- Sister Mary Loquacious, a satanic nun of the Chattering Order of St Beryl. She managed to fumble the switching of the Antichrist with a human baby.
- Mr Young, "father" of Adam.
- Mr Tyler, chairman of a Residents' Association.
- The International Express Man, a delivery man of the International Express, who delivered parcels and messages to the Four Horsemen. He dies delivering a message to Death.

=== Apocalyptic Horsepersons ===
- Death, leader of the Four Horsemen and the only one who survives the Apocalypse. He is everywhere.
- War, aka Carmine Zuigiber. Her item of power is the flaming sword that God once gave to Aziraphale.
- Famine, aka Dr Raven Sable. His item of power is a pair of scales.
- Pestilence, former Horseman. He retired in 1936, muttering about penicillin.
- Pollution, aka Chalky, Pestilence's replacement. Their item of power is a silver crown, which is tarnished black by their touch.

== Development ==
=== Origins and authorship ===
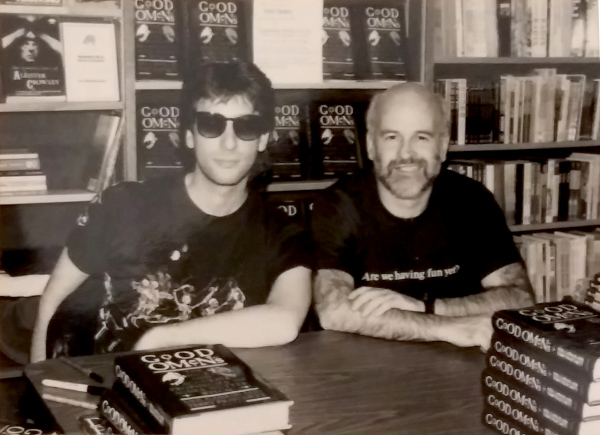
Neil Gaiman and Terry Pratchett signing the first American edition of Good Omens at Minneapolis' DreamHaven Books, in Sept 1990.

Neil Gaiman and Terry Pratchett had known each other since 1985. Gaiman, inspired by his success in writing a biography of Douglas Adams (Don't Panic: Douglas Adams & The Hitchhiker's Guide to the Galaxy), and in observing Adams's work at close quarters decided to try novel writing, and sent a piece of work to a number of friends, including Pratchett, for feedback. Pratchett responded positively eight months later. According to Gaiman, he began the book as a parody of Richmal Crompton's William books, named William the Antichrist, but it outgrew the original idea. It was their own idea, not that of their publisher, to collaborate on a novel.

Gaiman said:

We were both living in England when we wrote it. At an educated guess, although neither of us ever counted, Terry probably wrote around 60,000 "raw" and I wrote 45,000 "raw" words of Good Omens, with, on the whole, Terry taking more of the plot with Adam and the Them in, and me doing more of the stuff that was slightly more tangential to the story, except that broke down pretty quickly and when we got towards the end we swapped characters so that we'd both written everyone by the time it was done, but then we also rewrote and footnoted each other's bits as we went along, and rolled up our sleeves to take the first draft to the second (quite a lot of words), and, by the end of it, neither of us was entirely certain who had written what. It was indeed plotted in long daily phone calls, and we would post floppy disks (and this was back in 1988 when floppy disks really were pretty darn floppy) back and forth.

Pratchett said:

I think this is an honest account of the process of writing Good Omens. It was fairly easy to keep track of because of the way we sent disks to one another, and because I was Keeper of the Official Master Copy I can say that I wrote a bit over two thirds of Good Omens. However, we were on the phone to each other every day, at least once. If you have an idea during a brainstorming session with another guy, whose idea is it? One guy goes and writes 2,000 words after thirty minutes on the phone, what exactly is the process that's happening? I did most of the physical writing because:

1. I had to. Neil had to keep Sandman going – I could take time off from the DW;
2. One person has to be overall editor, and do all the stitching and filling and slicing and, as I've said before, it was me by agreement – if it had been a graphic novel, it would have been Neil taking the chair for exactly the same reasons it was me for a novel;
3. I'm a selfish bastard and tried to write ahead to get to the good bits before Neil.

Initially, I did most of Adam and the Them and Neil did most of the Four Horsemen, and everything else kind of got done by whoever – by the end, large sections were being done by a composite creature called Terryandneil, whoever was actually hitting the keys. By agreement, I am allowed to say that Agnes Nutter, her life and death, was completely and utterly mine. And Neil proudly claims responsibility for the maggots. Neil's had a major influence on the opening scenes, me on the ending. In the end, it was this book done by two guys, who shared the money equally and did it for fun and wouldn't do it again for a big clock.

=== International editions ===
The United States edition of Good Omens had numerous alterations to the text. The most significant alteration to the main text is the addition of an extra 700-word section just before the end, dealing with what happened to the character of Warlock, the American diplomat's son, who was swapped with Adam. The American edition also adds numerous footnotes not found in British editions.

The Dutch translation of Good Omens contains a preface by the translator wherein he asserts that no extra footnotes were added to clarify matters that might be unclear to a modern audience – annotated with footnotes explaining omen and Crowley.

In the French version, some characters were given French-sounding names. Agnes Nutter became Agnès Barge (barge is French for nutter), Anathema Device became Anathème Bidule (Bidule being French for Device). Crowley became Rampa (as 'Crawly' became 'Crowley', 'Rampant' became 'Rampa'), after the infamous author of The Third Eye, T. L. Rampa. The French publisher of Good Omens (J'ai Lu) was also the French publisher of the T. L. Rampa books.

In the Czech version of the book, the names of Agnes, Anathema, the Satanist nuns, Pepper and some minor characters were translated too. The book contains many extra footnotes as an explanation to some of the phrases that were translated more literally than usual and to add new jokes (for example the part where Anathema meets Adam and tells him she is an occultist, noting: "You were thinking 'Nothin' wrong with my eyes, they don't need examining,' weren't you?" was accompanied by a footnote: To those who understood what was the point, congratulations. For those whom it took as long as it took me: The Dictionary's definition: Oculist – rather an old-fashioned word for an ophthalmologist.).

=== Historical and literary inspirations ===
The names of Agnes Nutter and her descendant Anathema Device were inspired by two of the victims of the 1612 Pendle witch trials, Alice Nutter and Elizabeth Device. Gaiman confirmed the homage in a 2016 tweet.

The book is also inspired by parts of The Book of Revelation.

== Reception ==
According to Gaiman, no one attended an early book signing event in Manhattan. Kirkus Reviews called the novel "hilariously naughty". It received a starred review from Library Journal, which called it "irreverently funny and unexpectedly wise". Joe Queenan in a negative review for the New York Times wrote that Good Omens was "an experience that will persuade even the most ferociously Anglophilic Yank that the British reading public is every bit as intellectually slovenly as its American counterpart", and criticized the humor of the novel.

The book has received the following awards:

- World Fantasy Award nominee for Best Novel, 1991
- Locus Award nominee for Best Fantasy Novel, 1991
- Mir Fantastiki Special Award for "The most anticipated book", 2012
- Won FantLab.ru poll for "Best Translated Novel", 2012

== Follow-up ==
In 1989, a year before the completed novel was published, Gaiman and Pratchett visited the US for the World Fantasy Convention in Seattle, and shared a hotel room to save money. Unable to sleep at night due to jet lag, and not having anything else to talk about, they started plotting out the sequel to Good Omens. 668—The Neighbour of the Beast was slated as the sequel's title; however, after Gaiman moved to the US, Pratchett expressed doubt that a sequel would be written. Gaiman later affirmed this in one of his essays, titled Terry Pratchett: An Appreciation. Rhianna Pratchett has indicated that her father spoke with Gaiman on the sequel concept again in 2013. Terry Pratchett died in 2015.

In 2017, Gaiman revealed – as part of the filming of the television series based on the book – that he and Pratchett had done some plotting for the sequel, including that "[t]here would have been a lot of angels in the sequel", one of whom was Gabriel, who was only briefly mentioned in Good Omens but was to figure more prominently in the television series. When asked if Neil had any plans on releasing a sequel to Good Omens or maintaining its status as a standalone work, Gaiman stated that there was a plot for one that Pratchett wanted to be told, but that whether or not it would be made would depend on certain factors.

== In other media ==
=== Film ===
A film, to be directed by Terry Gilliam, was planned. As of 2002, Gilliam had still hoped to make the film with its already completed script, but by 2006, it seemed to have come to nothing. Funding was slow to appear, and Gilliam moved on to other projects. There was a rumour that Johnny Depp was originally cast as Crowley and Robin Williams as Aziraphale. However Gaiman has said on his website, "Well, Robin's worked with Terry Gilliam before as well, of course, most famously in The Fisher King. But I have no idea about Good Omens casting (except for Shadwell. Terry told me who he wanted to play Shadwell. I immediately forgot the man's name, although I can assure you that it wasn't Robin Williams)." According to an interview in May 2006 at The Guardian's Hay Festival, Gilliam was still hoping to go ahead with the film.

Gaiman confirmed in a 2013 podcast interview with Empire that the majority of the funding for the film was in place in 2002, but the project could not attract the initial funding to begin production.

Even in 2008, Gilliam was still hopeful about the project. Neil Gaiman's Stardust (based on his own novel of the same name) and Beowulf were successful as films in 2007, which had given the adaptation of Good Omens a better chance of being picked up. A Gilliam quote from an Empire interview appeared as follows: "And I thought with Neil, with Stardust and with Beowulf and there's another one – an animated film, a Henry Selick thing he's written Coraline – I was thinking he's really hot now, so maybe there's a chance. I mean it's such a wonderful book. And I think our script is pretty good, too. We did quite a few changes. We weren't as respectful as we ought to have been. But Neil's happy with it!"

The history of this project and similar experiences with Gaiman's various other works (including The Sandman series) have led to his cynical view of the Hollywood process, a view which occasionally surfaces in his weblog and in some of his short fiction. Pratchett shared a similar opinion, and was quoted as saying, "The difference between me and Neil in our attitude to movie projects is that he doesn't believe they're going to happen until he's sitting in his seat eating popcorn, and I don't believe they're going to happen." Pratchett had had many of the same issues with Hollywood 'suits', but he, too, would have loved to see the film made.

=== Television ===
In February 2011, it was reported that a television adaptation may be produced, with Terry Jones and Gavin Scott "in talks" to write the series. On 19 March 2011, Gaiman announced on his website that a television series adaptation of his novel "is in the works from Terry Jones" with a link to Pratchett's webpage confirming the news. In August 2012, Pratchett's daughter, Rhianna Pratchett, announced an establishment of a new production company, Narrativia, with plans to produce projects including a television film based on Good Omens.

In April 2016, Gaiman announced that he was writing the scripts for a six-part television series as the result of a request from Pratchett, made shortly before his death. In January 2017, Amazon announced that Gaiman would adapt Good Omens into a "comedic apocalyptic" miniseries, set to be released on Prime Video in 2019. The adaptation is a six-part limited comedy series for Amazon and the BBC, and Gaiman served as showrunner. On 14 August 2017, Michael Sheen and David Tennant were announced as having been cast in the respective lead roles of Aziraphale and Crowley. The village of Hambleden in Buckinghamshire is the filming location for 'Tadfield' with Jasmine Cottage being located just north of the village at Colstrope Farm. The adaptation was produced by BBC Studios in collaboration with Narrativia and Gaiman's The Blank Corporation. Distribution was handled by BBC Worldwide. All six episodes of the serial were released on 31 May 2019 on Amazon Prime. In June 2021 Amazon renewed Good Omens for a second season, with Sheen and Tennant returning alongside most of the original cast, and a third and final season being announced in December 2023. In July 2024 Gaiman resigned from his position on the show after widespread allegations of abuse against women.

=== Radio ===
On 5 September 2014, it was confirmed that the BBC would produce a radio adaptation of the novel, to be broadcast on BBC Radio 4, starting 22 December of that year. Mark Heap and Peter Serafinowicz led the cast, which also included Louise Brealey, Phil Davis, Mark Benton, Colin Morgan, Paterson Joseph, Josie Lawrence, Jim Norton, Adam Thomas Wright and Hollie Burgess. Neil Gaiman and Terry Pratchett had cameo roles as a pair of traffic cops called "Neil" and "Terry". The series was broadcast in six episodes starting in December 2014.

=== Theatre ===
In March 2013, Cult Classic Theatre in Glasgow, Scotland, performed Amy Hoff's adaptation of Good Omens with the permission of Pratchett and Gaiman. In November 2017, Squabbalogic staged a special development reading of Good Omens: The Musical in Sydney, Australia with Nancye Hayes, Barry Quin and Paul Capsis.

=== Graphic novel ===
In May 2023, it was announced that Colleen Doran would adapt Good Omens into a graphic novel. In August 2023, the estate of Pratchett created a Kickstarter campaign to fund the graphic novel. The campaign successfully closed on 30 August with over 36,000 backers and over £2.4 million in funding.

== See also ==
- Bible errata – Typographical errors that have occurred in various editions of The Bible
- Lucifer (DC Comics) – another Demon character with a complex personality, created by Neil Gaiman
- Nicholas Barbon – English economist, physician, life insurance pioneer
- Pendle witches – English witch hunt and trial in 1612
