= Nick Perumov =

Pen name of Nikolay Daniilovich Perumov

Nikolay Perumov
- (Russian: Николай Перумов)
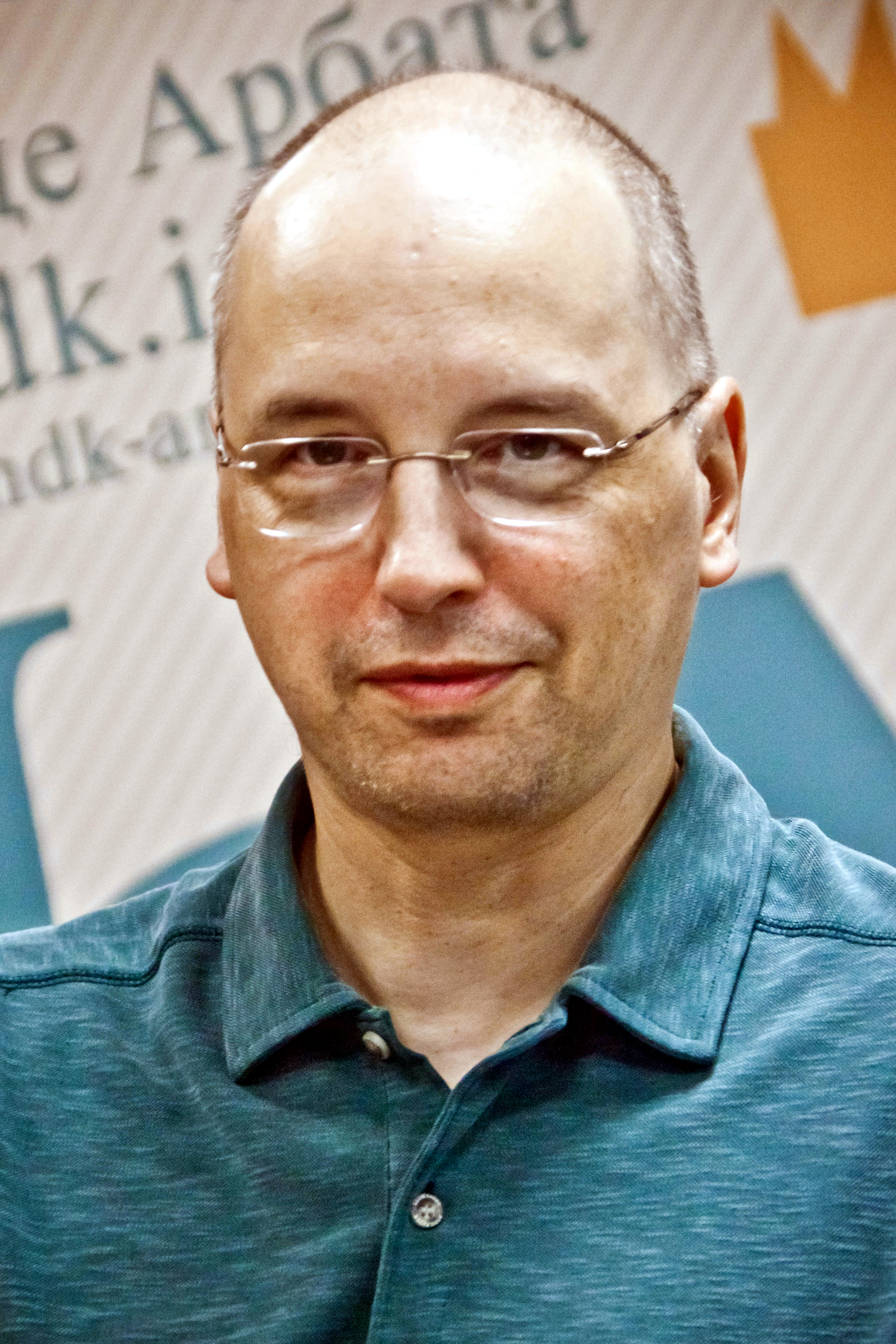
- Born: 21 November 1963 (age 62); Leningrad, Soviet Union
- Occupations: Writer, microbiologist
- Writing career
- Genre: Fantasy

Nick Perumov (Russian: Ник Перумов) is the pen name of Nikolay Daniilovich Perumov (Russian: Николай Даниилович Перумов; born 21 November 1963), a Russian microbiologist, as well as a fantasy and science fiction writer.

== Biography ==
Perumov was born 21 November 1963 in Leningrad, USSR. His father, Daniil Alexandrovich Perumov, was a biologist. Nikolai began writing short stories when he was a teenager, and after reading The Lord of the Rings in the early 1980s, he became a fantasy fan. After studying at the Leningrad Polytechnical Institute, Perumov worked at a research institute, and later as a translator.

In 1985–1991 he wrote his first fantasy novel Нисхождение тьмы (Niskhozhdeniye t'my, "Descent of Darkness"), which consisted of two volumes: Эльфийский Клинок (El'fiyskiy Klinok, "Elven Blade") and Черное Копье (Chernoye Kop'ye, "Black Lance"). The book was set in J. R. R. Tolkien's Middle-earth, 300 years after the War of the Ring. Perumov initially regarded his novel as just a Tolkien fan fiction written for friends, until one of his colleagues offered to publish it. In 1993 the duology, re-edited and renamed Кольцо Тьмы (The Ring of Darkness) was published by Severo-Zapad, which paid Perumov a small sum of $300. The Ring of Darkness was a surprising success, both with readers and with critics. It sold at least 100,000 copies, and spurred Perumov's popularity. The book provoked a controversy in Tolkien fandom; some fans considered it was not fair to set the book in Middle-earth rather than Perumov's own setting, and to challenge Tolkien's philosophy of "Good against Evil" in it. The Ring of Darkness, however, was one of a number of such projects, as several other 1990s Russian writers, including Natalia "Niennah" Vasilyeva and Kirill Yeskov, went on to publish unauthorized Middle-earth books that challenged Tolkien far more sharply.

After the success of his debut, Perumov decided to start a career as a professional writer. He wrote the novel Гибель Богов (Gibel' Bogov, "[Godsdoom]"), heavily inspired by Norse mythology. It was the first book to be set in Упорядоченное (The Consistent), a multiverse of many connected worlds. The Consistent became the main setting of his following books, including the most known, 8-volume series Хранитель Мечей (Khranitel' Mechey, "The Keeper of Swords").

Over 4 million copies of Perumov's books have been published, and his work has been translated into many languages, mostly in Northern and Eastern Europe. One of his books, Godsdoom, has been translated to English by Liv Bliss. At Eurocon 2004 he was given an award as the "Best Science Fiction Writer in Europe". He is a friend of Vera Kamsha, whom he persuaded to start a career as a writer. In the 2000s Kamsha became a popular fantasy writer. Perumov enjoys Melnitsa music and wrote a cameo appearance for the band in one of his books.

During the 1998 Russian financial crisis, Perumov moved to the United States, where he works for North Carolina Research Campus as a microbiologist. He claims writing is his 'hobby', while science is his job.

== Series and other works ==
=== Middle-earth ===
Кольцо Тьмы (Ring of Darkness)

This fantasy novel takes place in J. R. R. Tolkien's Middle-earth, 300 years after the War of the Ring. The books tell the story of hobbit Folko Brandybuck, the heir of Meriadoc, and his two dwarven friends, who are trying to protect Middle-earth from a new danger: powerful Olmer, the leader of the Eastern nations, who is gathering the remainder of the nine Nazgûl's Rings of Power. The original duology was later followed with the third book, Адамант Хенны (The Adamant of Henna). Judging by authors plans two more books of this series should come to the light.

1. Эльфийский Клинок (Elven Blade, 1993)
2. Черное Копье (Black Lance, 1993)
3. Адамант Хенны (The Adamant of Henna, 1995)
4. Небо Валинора (The Heaven of Valinor, TBA)
5. Водопад (Waterfall, TBA)

=== Norse mythology ===
Хроники Хьерварда (Hjorward chronicles)

Initially it was a three-volume series of non-connected novels telling the different parts of Hjorward world history, including the rebellion of Hedin and Rakot against the Young Gods, the main event of Consistent history. It is continued by some spin-offs and series of Godsdoom 2.

1. Гибель Богов (Godsdoom, 1995)
2. Воин Великой Тьмы (Warrior of Great Darkness, 1995)
3. Земля Без Радости (The Land Without Joy, 1995)
4. Раб Неназываемого (The Slave of Undenoted, cancelled, intended to be one of initial four-volume series)
5. 1000 Лет Хрофта (1000 Years of Khroft, 2013)
6. Белая Кровь Рассвета (White Blood of Dawn, cancelled, sequel of 'The Land Without Joy')

Хранитель Мечей (Keeper of the Swords)

Also known as 'Chronicles of The Rift' or 'Series of Mage', this eight-volume series tells the story of Fess the necromancer, who keeps the secret of magical Diamond and Wooden swords. Fess was caught in the 'closed' world of Evial, and suffers the pressure of local inquisition.

1. Алмазный Меч, Деревянный Меч (Diamond Sword, Wooden Sword, 1998)
2. Рождение Мага (Birth of the Mage, 1999)
3. Странствия Мага (Wandering of the Mage, 2000)
4. Одиночество Мага (Solitude of the Mage, 2001)
5. Война Мага: Дебют (War of the Mage: Opening, 2003)
6. Война Мага: Миттельшпиль (War of the Mage: Middlegame, 2004)
7. Война Мага: Эндшпиль (War of the Mage: Endgame, 2006)
8. Война Мага: Конец Игры (War of the Mage: Game Over, 2006)

Short novels connected:

- Дочь Некроманта (Daughter of the Necromancer, 2000)
- Вернуть Посох (Bring Back the Rod, 2000)
- Эльфийская Стража, или Лемех и Борозда (Elfguard, or Plough and Furrow, 2013)

Гибель Богов 2 (Godsdoom 2)

A finale to the whole Consistent universe. Apparently it is yet to be finished.

- Гибель Богов 2: Память пламени (Godsdoom 2: Memory of Flames, 2012)
- Гибель Богов 2: Удерживая небо (Godsdoom 2: Holding the Sky, 2012)
- Гибель Богов 2: Пепел Асгарда (Godsdoom 2: Ashes of Asgard, 2013)
- Гибель Богов 2: Асгард Возрождённый (Godsdoom 2: Asgard Resurrected, 2015)
- Гибель Богов 2: Хедин, враг мой (Godsdoom 2: Hedin, The Enemy of Mine, first volume - 2015, second volume - 2016)

=== Science fiction and other stories ===
Империя Превыше Всего (Empire Above All)

This science fiction duology tells about a distant future in which the "German nation" became the human hegemon in the Galaxy, namely through abandoning its Nazi ideology in favour of a multicultural "Empire Above All" nationalism. The book centers on the quest of Ruslan Fateev to attain independence for his homeworld of New Crimea, the sole Russian-speaking corner of the Empire (according to the books, the overwhelming majority of Russians chose voluntary Germanisation over the centuries). All this is set in an atmosphere of uprisings of a federation of colony worlds against the Empire and the invasion of human planets by mysterious alien creatures named "Biomorphs".

1. Череп на Рукаве (Skull on a Sleeve, 2002)
2. Череп в Небесах (Skull in the Sky, 2004)

Техномагия (Technomagic)

1. Разрешенное Волшебство (Legal Wizardy, 1996)
2. Враг Неведом (Enemy is Unknown, 1997)
3. Зона Магов (Zone of Mages, cancelled)

Семь зверей Райлега (Seven Beasts of Raileg)

1. Тёрн (Thorn, 2007)
2. Алиедора (Aliedora, 2009)
3. Имя Зверя:Взглянуть в бездну (The Name of the Beast: Take a Look into Abyss, 2011)
4. Имя Зверя:Исход Дракона (The Name of the Beast: Dragon Exodus, 2011)

Я, Всеслав (Me, Vseslav)

1. Русский Меч (Russian Sword, 2008)
2. Выпарь Железо из Крови (Vapour Iron from Blood, 2008)
3. Пес Всеслава (Vseslav's Cur, 2008)
4. Случай под Кубинкой (Incident near Kubinka, TBA)
5. Эльф с Края Света (Elve from The World's End, unknown)
6. Богатырская Застава (Heroic Outpost, unknown)

Out of Series

- Специалист по безопасности (Security Specialist, unknown)
- Миссия Мессии (Messiah's Mission, unknown, to be renamed)
- Кормовые - Пли! (Sterns - Fire!, TBA)
- Суд (Tribunal, finished, not to be published, based on "Hard to be a God" by Arkadi and Boris Strugatski)
- 41 (unknown)
- Крепость Этенгарда (Stronghold of Ethgenard, unknown)
- ... Погибнуть не представлялось возможным (...Perishing seems not to be possible, unknown)
- Сказочка (Little Tale, unknown)

Co-authored works

- Чёрная Кровь (Black Blood, 1996) with Svyatoslav Loginov
- Не Время Для Драконов (No Time For Dragons, 1997) with Sergey Lukyanenko.
- Армагеддон (Armageddon, 2000, published in United States as 'Lords of Terror') with Allan Cole.
- Посредник (Mediator, 1996) with Polina Kaminskaya.
- Похитители Душ (Kidnappers of Souls, 1996) with Polina Kaminskaya.
- Один на Один (One on One, 1997) with Polina Kaminskaya.
- Млава красная (Mlava the Red, 2011) with Vera Kamsha.
- Черная Метель (Black Snowstorm, at work, sequel of 'Mlava the Red') with Vera Kamsha.
- Верное Слово (True Word, 2016) with Darja Zarubina.

Story collections

- Испытано на себе (Tested on Self, 2007)
- Волчье поле (Wolve's marge, 2008)
- Воевода и Ночь (Voevode and The Night, 2010)
- Молли из Норд-Йорка (Molly from Nord-York, 2015)

Трилогия о Молли Блэкуотер (Molly Blackwater Trilogy)

- Молли Блэкуотер. За краем мира (Moly Blackwater. Beyond World's Edge. 2016)
- Сталь, пар и магия (Steel, Steam and Magic. TBA)

Preceded by Sergey Lukyanenko	ESFS award for Best Author; 2004	Succeeded by Marina and Sergey Dyachenko
