= Vera Kamsha =

Russian author and journalist

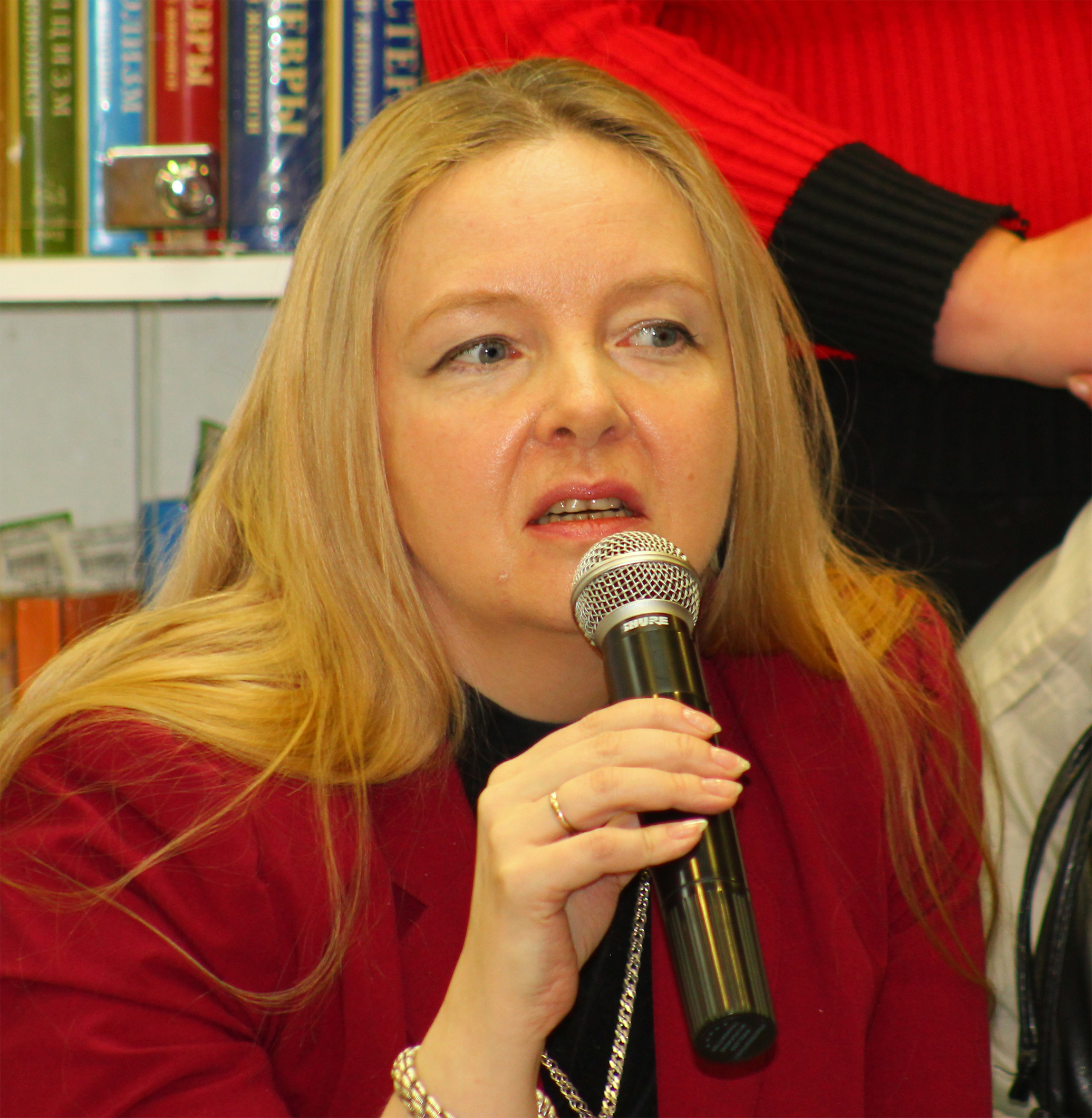
- Kamsha in 2011
- Born: 5 November 1962 (age 63); Lviv, Ukrainian SSR
- Writing career
- Genre: Fantasy

Vera Viktorovna Kamsha (Russian: Вера Викторовна Камша; born November 5, 1962, in Lviv, Ukrainian SSR) is a Russian author of high fantasy and a journalist.

== Biography ==
Kamsha graduated from Lviv Polytechnic, after which she moved to Leningrad. At early 1990s she was involved in politics and worked in Lensoviet. From 1994 onwards she became a journalist.

The turning point in her career was her 2001 meeting with Nick Perumov, already a popular fantasy writer by the time. She interviewed him and the two found many similarities in taste (such as their love to Nikolai Gumilev's poetry). It was under Perumov's influence that Kamsha made first attempts to write and publish fantasy books.

In 2001, Kamsha's first novel, Dark Star (Russian: "Тёмная Звезда") was published by Eksmo. The book started Chronicles of Artsia series, a traditional Medieval high fantasy. Kamsha's later books, Gleams of Aeterna series in particular, were heavily influenced by George R. R. Martin's A Song of Ice and Fire, as well as by Alexandre Dumas's historical adventure novels. The series is set in a fantasy world resembling 17th-century Europe, with firearms and a strong church influence. The plot revolves around the power rivalry of two dynasties, where both sides have their flaws and neither is idealized. Recently she collaborated with Perumov on their alternate history novel Mlava Krasnaya (Mlava the Red).

The first books of the Gleams of Aeterna series were translated to Polish and released by Wroclaw publisher Wydawnictwo Dolnośląskie.

== Bibliography ==
Chronicles of Artsia series:

- Тёмная звезда (The Dark Star, 2001)
- Несравненное право (The Incomparable Right, 2001)
- Кровь заката (The Blood of Sunset, 2002)
- Довод королей (The Argument of Kings, 2002)
- Башня ярости. Черные маки (A Tower of Fury. Black Poppies, 2003)
- Башня ярости. Всходы ветра (A Tower of Fury. Growth of the Wind, 2003)

Gleams of Aeterna series:

- Красное на красном (Red on the Red, 2004)
- От войны до войны (From War till War, 2005)
- Лик Победы (The Face of Victory, 2005)
- Зимний излом. Из глубин (The Winter Twist: From the Depth, 2006)
- Зимний излом. Яд минувшего (The Winter Twist: Poison of the Past, 2007)
- Сердце Зверя. Правда стали, ложь зеркал (Heart of the Beast: Truth of Steel, False of Mirrors, 2008)
- Сердце зверя. Шар судеб (Heart of the Beast: Sphere of Destiny, 2009)
- Синий взгляд смерти. Закат (Blue Eyes of Death: Sunset, 2011)
- Синий взгляд смерти. Полночь (Blue Eyes of Death: Midnight, 2012)
- Синий взгляд смерти. Рассвет, часть 1 (Blue Eyes of Death: Sunrise, part 1, 2017)
- Синий взгляд смерти. Рассвет, часть 2 (Blue Eyes of Death: Sunrise, part 2, 2017)
- Синий взгляд смерти. Рассвет, часть 3 (Blue Eyes of Death: Sunrise, part 3, TBR 2017)
- Синий взгляд смерти. Рассвет, часть 4 (Blue Eyes of Death: Sunrise, part 4, TBR 2017)

Non-serialized:

- Время золота, время серебра (Time for Gold, Time for Silver, 2005) - with Eleonora and Sergey Ratkevich
- Кесари и Боги (Caesars and Gods, 2008)
- Млава Красная (Mlava the Red, 2011) - with Nick Perumov

== Awards ==
- Mir Fantastiki award for Lik Pobedy as the best fantasy novel of 2005.
- Sword of Rumata award for Zimny Izlom (2008)
- Roscon special award (2011)
