= Maryna and Serhiy Dyachenko =

Ukrainian fantasy fiction writers

Maryna Dyachenko-Shirshova Serhiy Dyachenko
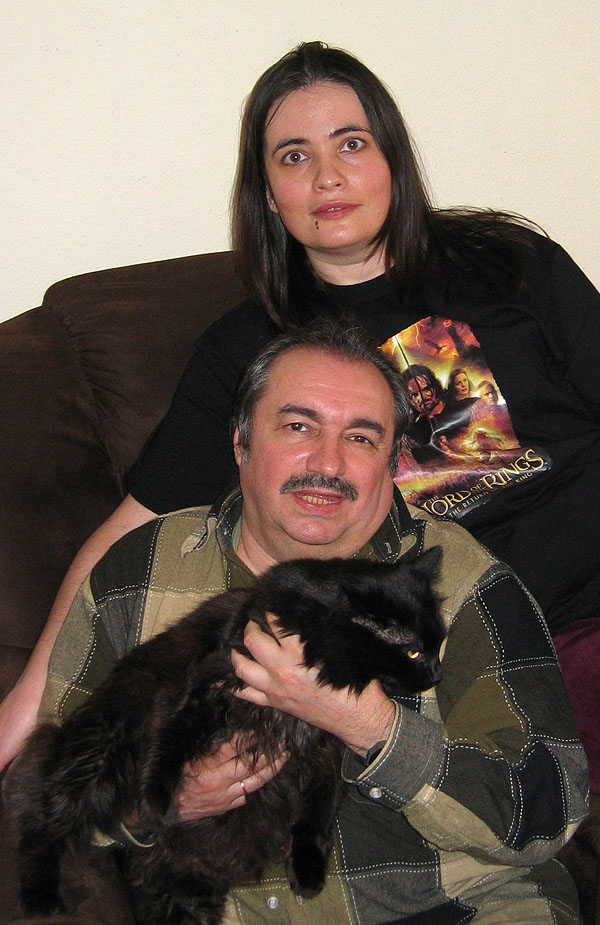
- Born: Maryna: 23 January 1968 (age 58); Serhiy: 14 April 1945; Kyiv, Ukrainian SSR, Soviet Union (now Kyiv, Ukraine; both)
- Died: Serhiy: 5 May 2022 (aged 77); United States
- Citizenship: Soviet Union, Ukraine
- Occupation: writers
- Writing career
- Language: Ukrainian, Russian
- Genres: Science-fiction, Fantasy, Fairy tale
- Notable awards: Shevchenko National Prize (1987, Serhiy D.)
- Literary movement: "M-realism"

Spouses Maryna Yuryivna Dyachenko (Note: Ukrainian: Марина Юріївна Дяченко, romanized: Maryna Yuriivna Diachenko) (née Shyrshova, (Note: Ukrainian: Ширшова, romanized: Shyrshova) born January 23, 1968) and Serhiy Serhiyovych Dyachenko (Note: Ukrainian: Сергій Сергійович Дяченко, romanized: Serhii Serhiiovych Diachenko) (April 14, 1945 – May 5, 2022) were co-authors of fantasy literature from Ukraine writing in Russian. Three of their novels have been translated into English. At the World and All-European Science Fiction Convention Eurocon 2005 in Glasgow, Marina and Serhiy Dyachenko were recognized as the best science fiction writers in Europe.

== Personal life ==
The Dyachenkos are from Kyiv, Ukrainian SSR, Soviet Union (now Kyiv, Ukraine). For four years, they lived in Russia, then moved to California, United States in 2013. Serhiy Dyachenko died on 5 May 2022 in the United States.

== Work ==
=== Background ===
Serhiy Dyachenko graduated from Kyiv Medical Institute and worked as a psychiatrist. Later, Serhiy Dyachenko working as a writer and screenwriter, together with director Anatoliy Borsyuk and cinematographer Oleksandr Frolov, was awarded the Taras Shevchenko National Prize of Ukraine in 1987 for "The Star of Vavilov" (Russian: "Звезда Вавилова") about the life of imprisoned Russian agronomist Nikolai Vavilov. The film was produced by the Kyiv Studio of Popular Science Films. Serhiy graduated from the Faculty of Scriptwriting of the All-Russian State University of Cinematography in 1989. Maryna Dyachenko graduated from the Theatre Institute of Kyiv in 1989 and worked as a professional theatre and cinema actress.

=== Self-description and Collaboration ===
The Dyachenkos describe their work as "M-realism" with the 'M' "open to interpretation." Without defining the meaning of the "M", in 2014 Sergey Dyachenko explained it as "Marina's realism", expanding "that's where the romanticism comes from, and the stubborn humanism, and the hope for white magic and a better tomorrow."

Their works have been subject to scholarly analysis.

In a 2019 profile, Julia Meitov Hersey summarized their collaboration as follows: "It is thanks to Sergey's skills of writing solid plots that Marina's beautiful aethereal worlds have such a strong structure, a foundation built on the characters' flesh and bone, their blood and tears. Their ideal fantasy is a story of a real person in a chimerical world."

=== Novels ===
The Gate-Keeper (Russian: Привратник), their first novel, was published in 1994. It received the Crystal Table prize (Russian: Хрустальный стол) at the book festival Zoryany Schlyach, and the novel was awarded the title "Best Debut Work" at the EuroCon competition in 1995. The Gate-keeper became the first novel in the Dyachenkos' fantasy tetralogy Wanderers ("Скитальцы"). With publishing of The Scar (Russian: Шрам) (1997), the sequel of The Gate-Keeper, the Dyachenkos established themselves as masters of psychological fantastic fiction. The Scar has received the "Sword in the Stone" award for best fantasy novel in 1997.

The Ritual (Russian: Ритуал) (1996) is about a princess and a dragon, the latter half-human. The novel received little attention and was not awarded any prizes.

Age of the Witch (1997) (Russian: Ведьмин век) involves characters from a number of mythologies, most prominently Slavonic. It received a literature award from the magazine Rainbow (Russian: Радуга) in 1997 and the "Zilantkon" -"Great Zilant" prize (Russian: Зиланткон — Большой Зилант) in Kazan in 1998.

The Cave (1998) (Russian: Пещера) was awarded the "Moon Sword" prize in 1999 for the best work of "mystical literature" published between 1997 and 1999.

Burned Tower (1998) (Russian: Горелая Башня) received a prize at Interpresscon competition in 1999.

The Frontier (1999) (Russian: Рубеж), written with A. Valentinov (Russian: А.Валентиновым) and H. L. Oldie (Russian: Г. Л. Олди), was awarded the Golden Caduceus prize at the festival "Star Bridge - 2000".

The Execution (1999) (Russian: Казнь) received a "The Wаnderer" award in 2000 and the Reader Appreciation award "Sigma-F" in 2000 as the Novel of the Year.

Armaged-Home (Russian: Армагед-дом) (1999), a work of social science fiction, takes place over a number of periods encompassing the life of its heroine and the society in which she lives. In the opinion of many critics and readers, it is one of the best of their novels.

The Green Card (2000) (Russian: Зелёная карта), later adapted into a screenplay, is a work of realist fiction about residents of Kyiv who have received an opportunity to immigrate to the United States.

Magicians Can Do Anything (2001) (Russian: Магам можно всё) was awarded the "Golden Caduceus" award at the 2001 Golden Bridge festival.

Valley of the Conscience (Russian: Долина Совести) was awarded the Bronze Snail, Russian science fiction - 2002, Sigma-F, and the "Golden Caduceus" award at the Golden Bridge 2002 festival.

Pandem (Russian: Пандем) took the "Silver Caduceus" prize at the 2003 Star Bridge 2003 festival.

Varan (Russian: Варан) was awarded the "Bronze Caduceus" prize at the 2004 Star Bridge festival. The Copper King, a fantasy novel loosely connected to it, was published in 2008.

The Pentacle (Russian: Пентакль), co-written A. Valentinov (Russian: А.Валентиновым) and G. L. Oldi (Russian: Г. Л. Олди), was awarded the "Golden Caduceus" prize at the 2005 Star Bridge festival.

Wild Energy. Lana (March 2006) (Ukrainian: Дика Енергія. Лана) is a fairy tale influenced by the music of the Ukrainian singer Ruslana (Ukrainian: Руслана), to whom the authors dedicated the work. It was awarded the "Bronze Caduceus" prize at the 2006 Star Bridge festival.

The Key of the Kingdom (Russian: Ключ от королевства) and its sequel Oberon's Word (Russian: Слово Оберона) appeared in 2006. The trilogy was concluded with Evil Has No Power (Russian: У зла нет власти) (2008).

Alena and Aspirin (Russian: Алёна и Аспирин), an unrelated psychological fantastic novel, was published in 2006. It was published in 2020 by HarperCollins as "Daughter from the Dark".

Vita Nostra was published in 2007. It was the first novel in the thematically related "Metamorphosis" cycle. The book collected dozens of awards from readers and professionals. Julia Meitov Hersey's translation of Vita Nostra was published by HarperCollins Publishers in November 2018. Digital, or Brevis Est, (2009) and Migrant, or Brevi Finietur, a work of science fiction, continue the cycle.

Possessed, an urban fantasy, was published in 2011.

Assassin of Reality: A Novel (Russian: Работа над ошибками, lit. 'Correcting Errors') was published in 2021. It is the sequel to 2007 novel Vita Nostra. The English translation was published in 2023.

== Novellas ==
Last Don Quixote (2000) (Russian: Последний Дон Кихот), a variation on Miguel de Cervantes' novel, became a base for a theatrical play. The novel was awarded the "Bronze Snail" (Russian: Бронзовая Улитка) (2001).

=== Awards ===
In 2001, Marina and Sergey Dyachenko were awarded the "Aelita" (Russian: Аэлита) prize.

== Literary awards ==
Maryna and Serhiy Dyachenko are recipients of the most prestigious literary awards in the science fiction in the Commonwealth of Independent States. Practically every novel they have written, in addition to several short stories, have received various awards.

They were honored as the ESFS's Best Writers of Europe in Eurocon 2005.

== Bibliography ==
Some of their novels have also been translated into other languages (e.g. Polish, English, etc.).

The Scar became their first major book publication in United States in February 2012 from Tor Books.

=== Novels ===
- The Gate Keeper (Russian: Привратник)
- The Rite (Russian: Ритуал)
- The Scar (Russian: Шрам)
- Skrut (Russian: Скрут)
- The Successor (Russian: Преемник)
- Age of the Witch (Russian: Ведьмин век)
- The Cave (Russian: Пещера)
- The Execution (Russian: Казнь)
- Armaged-Home (Russian: Армагед-дом)
- The Adventurer (Russian: Авантюрист)
- Magicians May Do Everything (Russian: Магам можно все)
- Valley of the Conscience (Russian: Долина Совести)
- Pandem (Russian: Пандем)
- The Pentacle (Russian: Пентакль) (co-authored with Andrey Valentinov and H. L. Oldie)
- Varan (Russian: Варан)
- Alena and Aspirine/Daughter from the Dark (Russian: Алёна и Аспирин) (published in Russian and Ukrainian)
- Wild Energy. Lana (Ukrainian: Дика енергія. Лана) (published in Russian and Ukrainian)
- The Key of the Kingdom (Russian: Ключ от королевства) (published in Russian and Ukrainian)
- Oberon's Word (Russian: Слово Оберона) (published in Russian and Ukrainian) (Ukrainian: Королівська обіцянка)
- Vita Nostra (published in English in November 2018)
- The Copper King (Russian: Медный Король)
- Evil Has No Power (Russian: У зла нет власти)
- Digital, or Brevis Est (Russian: Цифровой, или Brevis Est)
- Migrant, or Brevi Finietur (Russian: Мигрант, или Brevi Finietur)
- Possessed (Russian: Одержимая)
- Hundredfold (Russian: Стократ; also a wordplay on Socrates)
- Dark World: Equilibrium (Russian: Темный мир. Равновесие)
- The Ray (Russian: Луч)
- Assassin of Reality: A Novel (Russian: Работа над ошибками?)

=== Novellas ===
- "Bastard" (Russian: Бастард)
- "Stone's Roots" (Russian: Корни Камня)
- "Burned Tower" (Russian: Горелая Башня)
- "Last Don Quixote"(Russian: Последний дон Кихот)
- "Green Card"(Russian: Зеленая карта)
- ""Wolfs' Land" (Russian: Волчья сыть)
- "Emma and the Sphinx" (Russian: Эмма и сфинкс)
- "The Well Master" (Russian: Хозяин Колодцев)
- "Kon" (Russian: Кон)
- "Miseracle" (Russian: Мизеракль)
- "Zoo" (Russian: Зоопарк)
- "Two" (Russian: Две)
- "My Noble Knight Has Left Me..." (Russian: Уехал славный рыцарь мой)
- "The Sail Bird" (Russian: Парусная птица)
- "Vesnars' Land" (Russian: Земля веснаров)

=== Short stories ===
- "Virlena"(Russian: Вирлена)
- "Outside" (Russian: Вне)
- "The Throne" (Russian: Трон)
- "Oskol" (Russian: Оскол)
- "Horde's Man" (Russian: Ордынец)
- "A Tale About Golden Rooster" (Russian: Сказ о Золотом Петушке)
- "The Spell" (Russian: Заклинание)
- "Blind Basilisk" (Russian: Слепой василиск)
- "The Hamlet" (Russian: Хутор)
- "Mackler and Magic"(Russian: Маклер и магия)
- "The Wing" (Russian: Крыло)
- "Dark Side of the Moon" (Russian: Обратная сторона Луны)
- "Basketball" (Russian: Баскетбол)
- "Hair" (Russian: Волосы)
- "The Bloom" (Russian: Бутон)
- "The Promise" (Russian: Обещание)
- "Lunar Landscape" (Russian: Лунный пейзаж)
- "Marta" (Russian: Марта)
- "Visit to a Paediatrician" (Russian: Визит к педиатру)
- "'Churrem" ("The One Who Smiles") (Russian: Хуррем - значит "Улыбчивая")
- "Ataman" (Russian: Атаман)

==== With A. Valentinov, H. L. Oldie ====
- The Frontier (Russian: Рубеж)
- Bashtan (Russian: Баштан)
- Fights with no Rules (Russian: Бои без правил)
- Devil's Expedition (Russian: Чертова экзистенция)
- The Potato (Russian: Картошка)
- Werewolf in the Uniform (Russian: Оборотень в погонах)
- Bursak (Russian: Бурсак)
- Sanatorium (Russian: Санаторий)
- The Neighbor (Russian: Сосед)
- Venus Mirgorodus (Russian: Венера Миргородская)
- Day of the Dead in the Community Center (Russian: День мертвых в доме культуры)
- Sold Soul (Russian: Проданная душа
- Bazaar (Russian: Базар)
- Rescuers (Russian: Спасатели)
- The Wanderer (Russian: Колоброд)
- The Quarteronesse (Russian: Квартеронка)
- Dress Shoes (Russian: Туфли)
- Charisma Nuyrki Gavrosh (Russian: Харизма Нюрки Гаврош)
- Monte-Carltown (Russian: Монте-Карловка)
- Let's go to the Basement? (Russian: Пойдем в подвал?)
- Nespokiy (Russian: Неспокий)
- Scary M. (Russian: Страшная М.)
- Bogdana (Russian: Богдана)
- The Serdolick Perl (Russian: Сердоликовая бусина)
- The Attraction (Russian: Аттракцион)
- The Pan's Orchid (Russian: Панская орхидея)
- Cossack's Blood (Russian: Казачья кровь)
- The Flaming Motor (Russian: Пламенный мотор)
- The Competition (Russian: Конкурс)
- The Bequest Stone (Russian: Камень завета)
- Five Dead-ends Street (Russian: Улица пяти тупиков)

=== Plays ===
- Last Don Quixote (Russian: Последний дон Кихот)

=== Children's books ===
- Flying Hat (Russian: Летающая шляпа) (with A. Bondarchuk and I. Malkovich) Published in Ukrainian.
- Tales for Stevo (Russian: Сказки для Стаски)
- Adventures of Masha Michailova (Russian: Приключения Маши Михайловой); also published in Ukrainian (Ukrainian: Пригоди Марійки Михайлової).
- Search of Masha Michailova (Russian: Сыск Маши Михайловой)
- Flying fish (Russian: Воздушные рыбки) Published in Russian, Ukrainian an English
- Giraffe and Panda (Russian: Жирафчик и Пандочка) Published in Russian and Ukrainian.
- Fairy Tales: About the old woman, About the barrel, About the river, About the chicken, About the chicken-2, About the cricket (Russian: Про старушку, Про бочку, Про реку, Про курицу, Про курицу-2, Про сверчка)
- Gabriel and The Steel Lumberjack (Ukrainian: Габріель і сталевий лісоруб) Published in Ukrainian.

== Sources ==
- Writers' official international website, archived from 2011
- Writers' official international website, updated
- (in Russian) official website of the authors at www.rusf.ru
- (in Russian) official website of the authors at www.fiction.ru
- (in Russian) official website of the authors at sf.org.kemsu.ru
- (in Russian) Bibliography
- (in Russian) lib.ru Available books in the On-line Library of Moshkov
- Vita Nostra on Amazon
- The story behind the cover of Vita Nostra The Story Behind the Cover of Vita Nostra, by Marina & Sergey Dyachenko

Preceded by Nick Perumov	ESFS award for Best Author; 2005	Succeeded by H. L. Oldie
