= H. L. Oldie =

Ukrainian science fiction writers

Oleg Ladyzhensky and Dmitry Gromov
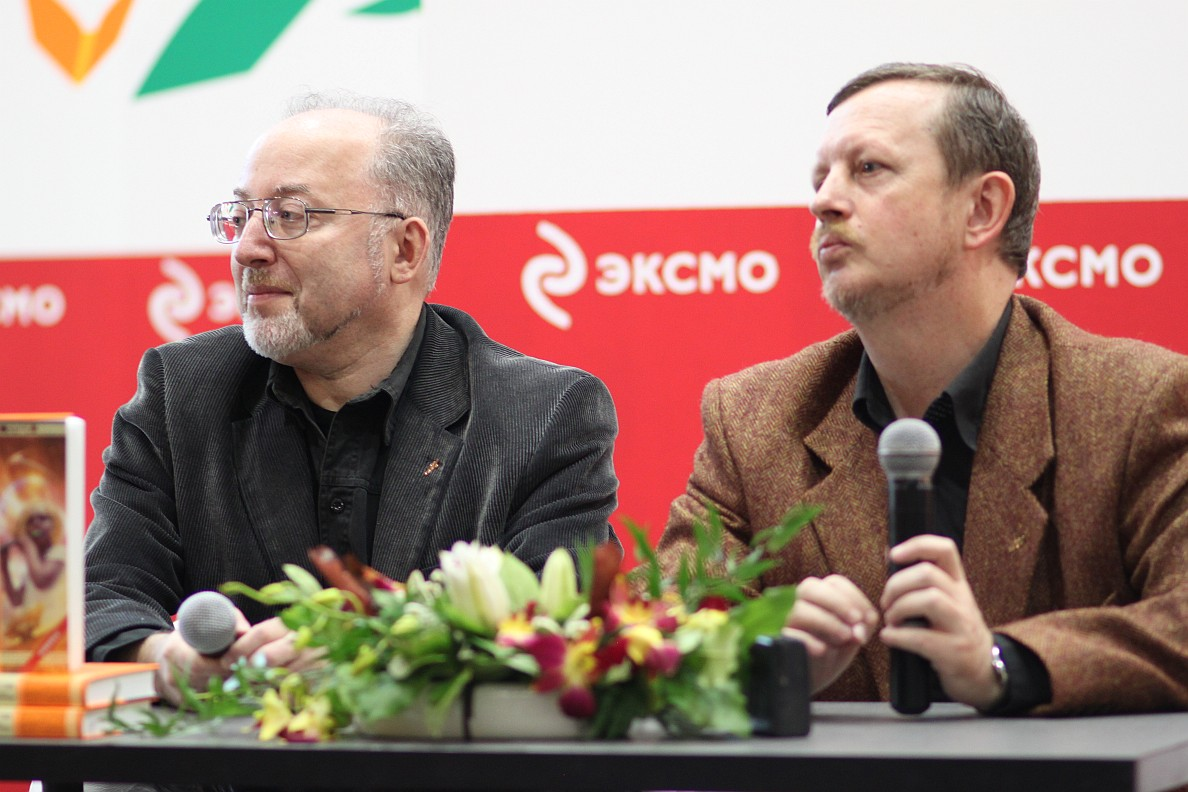
- Ladyzhensky (left) and Gromov (right) in 2010
- Born: 1963 (age 62–63); Ukrainian SSR
- Citizenship: Ukraine
- Occupation: Writer
- Writing career
- Pen name: H. L. Oldie
- Language: Russian
- Genres: Science fiction, fantasy
- Notable works: The Abyss of Hungry Eyes, Kabir Cycle, Achaean Cycle
- Notable awards: «Best Author» (Eurocon-2006), «Golden caduceus» - twice(Звёздный мост 2000, 2005), «Golden Roskon» (Роскон 2006)
- Website: oldie.ru

Henry Lion Oldie or H. L. Oldie (Russian: Генри Лайон Олди, Г. Л. Олди) is the pen name of Ukrainian science fiction and fantasy writers Dmitry Gromov and Oleg Ladyzhensky. Both authors reside in Kharkiv, Ukraine, and write in Russian. At Eurocon 2006 in Kyiv, the European Science Fiction Society named them Europe's best writers of 2006. Oldie collaborated with other Russophone Ukrainian writers, such as Andrey Valentinov, Marina and Sergey Dyachenko.

== Origin of the pseudonym ==
The "H. L. Oldie" pen name was invented as a merger of their names, Oleg and Dmitry, respectively, and the initials are derived from their family names in Cyrillic (Громов and Ладыженский). They eventually decided that H. L. should stay for "Henry Lion". The choice of a western-sounding pseudonym was common during the early post-Soviet era, when post-Soviet publishers and readers preferred science fiction and fantasy writing by foreign writers.

== Dmitry Gromov ==
Dmitry Yevgenyevich Gromov (Russian: Дмитрий Евгеньевич Громов; Ukrainian: Дмитро Євгенович Громов, Dmytro Yevhenovych Hromov) was born March 30, 1963, in Simferopol, Crimea, Ukraine. His family moved to Kharkiv when he was 11. There he graduated from Kharkiv Polytechnical Institute in 1986 and worked as chemistry engineer. Married, he has a son (born 1989). Since 1991 he has been pursuing a full-time writer career.

== Oleg Ladyzhensky ==
Oleg Semenovych Ladyzhensky (Russian: Олег Семёнович Ладыженский; Ukrainian: Олег Семенович Ладиженський, Oleh Semenovych Ladyzhenskyi) was born March 23, 1963, in Kharkiv, Ukraine. He graduated from Kharkiv Institute of Culture in 1984. After that he became a theatre director. It is Ladyzhensky who's responsible for H. L. Oldie's poetry, he publishes his verse separately from Oldie books as well, under his real name.

== Bibliography ==
(As of August 2017)

=== The Abyss of Hungry Eyes ===
- 1991 "Vitrages of Patriarchs"
- 1991 "Living for the Last Time"
- 1991 "Fear"
- 1991 "Getting into Character"
- 1992 "The Road"
- 1992 "Twilight of the World"
- 1993 "Waiting at Crossroads"
- 1993 "Risen from Heaven"
- 2001 "Your Turn"

Novelettes "The Eighth circle of Subway" (1990), "The Monster" (1990), "Tiger" (1990), "Nobody's home" (1990), "Master" (1991), "Broken circle" (1991), "Annabel Lee" (1991) published separately were included in the novellas of the cycle "The Abyss of Hungry Eyes"

=== Kabir's Cycle ===
- 1998 "I'll Take It Myself"
- 1994 "The Way of the Sword"
- 1996 "Let Them Die"

=== Achaean Cycle ===
- 1995 "A Hero Must Be Alone"
- 2000 "Odysseus Son of Laertes. Book 1: The Man of Nomos"
- 2000 "Odysseus Son of Laertes. Book 2: The Man of Cosmos"
- 2011 "The Grandson of Perseus. Book 1: My Grandfather is the Exterminator"
- 2011 "The Grandson of Perseus. Book 2: The Son of Limping Alceus"

=== World of Oikoumene ===
- "Oikoumene"
  - 2006 Book 1: "The Puppeteer"
  - 2007 Book 2: "The Pupa"
  - 2007 Book 3: "The Puppet Master"
- "Urbi et Orbi or To the City and To the World."
  - 2009 Book 1: "The Child of Oikoumene"
  - 2010 Book 2: "The Queen of Oikoumene"
  - 2010 Book 3: "The Exile of Oikoumene"
- "The Savages of Oikoumene."
  - 2013 Book 1 "The Wolf-cub"
  - 2014 Book 2 "The Wolf"
  - 2014 Book 3 "The Pack Leader"
- "Spurt Flight"
  - 2014 Book 1 "Blades of Oikoumene"
  - 2015 Book 2 "Ghosts of Oikoumene"
  - 2015 Book 3 "Angels of Oikoumene"

=== Fantasy World ===
- 2004 "ShMagic"
- 2005 "The Asylum for Heroes"
- "Three Stories about Miracles"
  - 2006 "Parasite"
  - 2007 "The Dreamulle of Reginald the Vampire"
  - 2007 "Sheller"
- 2008 "Harpy"
- 2004-2008 Short stories "The Inspectorate of The Seven's Archives"

=== Hening Cycle ===
- 2001 "The Almshouse"
- 2001-2003 "Songs of Peter Sliadek"
  - "Here and Now"
  - "The Ballade of the Twins"
  - "Genie Called Conscience"
  - "Pallor is No Sin, Maestro!"
  - "The Price of Money"
  - "Blind People Have Good Hearing"
  - "Shut My Eyes or The Day of All Outcasts"
  - "The Anika-Warrior's Cruel Choice"
  - "The Island Which is Always With You"
  - "The Hand and the Mirror"
  - "Vengeance is Mine, I Will Repay"
  - "Peter and Death"

=== Other books ===
- 1996 "Stepchildren of the Eighth Commandment"
- 1996 "Messiah Clears the Disk"
- 1996 "To Put the Soul into"
- 1997 "Black Trouble-Maker" (based on Mahabharata)
  - Book 1: "The Thunderstorm in Begininglessness"
  - Book 2: "Net for World Lords"
  - Book 3: "Go Where You Want"
- 1998 "We Are to Live Here" (in collaboration with Andrey Valentinov).
  - Book 1: "Armageddon Happened Yesterday"
  - Book 2: "Blood is Drunk by Handfuls"
- 1998 "Noperapon, or the Image and Likeness"
- 1998 "The Boundary" (in collaboration with Andrey Valentinov and Marina and Sergey Dyachenko).
  - Book 1: "Orphans Cost a Lot in Winter"
  - Book 2: "The Time to Break Rules",
- 1999 "Magiosi"
  - Book 1: "Let Their Way Be Wrong and Dark"
  - Book 2: "My Sin is Always with Me"
- 1999 "Path of the Cursed" (apologia of necro-romanticism; novella, by Dmitry Gromov, 1996–1999)
- 2000 "Alien among Our Own"
- 2001 "Where is Your Father, Adam?"
- 2002 "Order of St. Bestseller"
- 2002 "Second Hand" (play)
- 2002 "Jesters"
- 2004-2010 "The Pentacle" (the novel-cycle of 30 short stories, written in collaboration with Andrey Valentinov and Marina and Sergey Dyachenko
- 2006 "Shooter" (in collaboration with Andrey Valentinov)
- 2009 "Flusher, or Ask, and It Will Be Given to You"
- 2011 "Alumen" (written in collaboration with Andrey Valentinov)
  - Book 1: "The Mechanism of Time"
  - Book 2: "The Mechanism of Space"
  - Book 3: "The Mechanism of Life"
- 2012 "The Cyclops"
  - Book 1: "Monsters Were Kind to Me"
  - Book 2: The King of Stones"
- 2013 "Fortress Of My Soul" (written in collaboration with Andrey Valentinov)
- 2014 "Sherlock Holmes vs the Martians"
- 2016 "The Powerful Ones"
  - Book 1: "Prisoner of the Iron Mountain"
  - Book 2: "Black Heart"
- 2017 "Mirror, Mirror on the Wall..."

== Awards ==
2010, 2016 "Running on Waves" Prize (shortlist)

Preceded by Marina and Sergey Dyachenko	ESFS award for Best Author; 2006	Succeeded by Sándor Szélesi
