= Eksmo =

Russian publishing company

- Status: Active
- Founded: 1991
- Country of origin: Russia
- Headquarters location: Moscow
- Distribution: Worldwide
- Key people: Oleg Novikov, president
- Publication types: Books
- Fiction genres: Detectives, fiction, fantasy, classics, modern literature, poetry, books for children, non-fiction
- Imprints: Bombora, Inspiria, Black-and-white, Fanzon, Freedom, Komilfo, Like Book
- Official website: https://eksmo.ru/

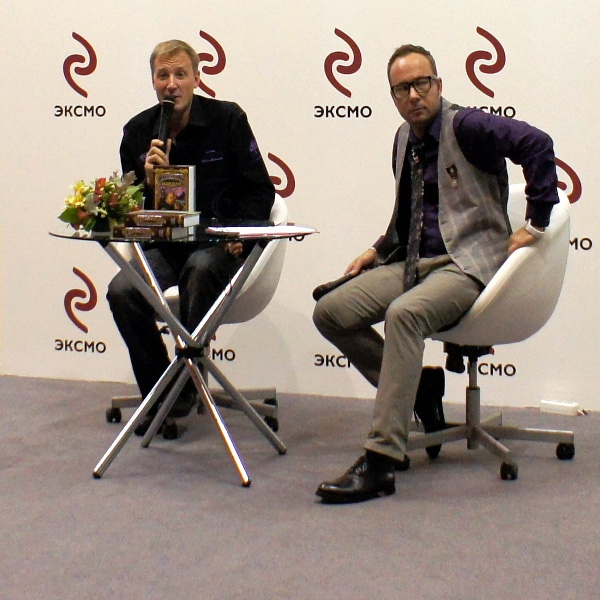
Moscow International Book Fair 2011. Vadim Panov at Eksmo booth

Eksmo Publishing House is a Russian publishing house founded in 1991. At first, the company worked in the field of wholesale trade in books. Since 1993, it started independent publishing activities.

In 2012, the publishing house became part of the structure of the publishing group "Eksmo-AST".

In 2023, the publishing house released 8643 titles of books. The total circulation was 41.8 million copies.

== History ==
The beginning of Eksmo's history dates back to the late Soviet Union, when only state publishing houses existed in the country. Eksmo was founded in 1991 by Alexander Krasovitsky, Oleg Novikov and Andrey Gredasov (the EKSMO brand appeared in 1993).

Businessman Alexander Krasovitsky created a trading company-distributor "Express", which ordered copies of certain books from Moscow printers and sold them in regions all over the country (and initially after the collapse of the Union - outside Russia), receiving 25-50% of the proceeds. These were mainly reprints of foreign classics, historical novels (Valentin Pikul's works, in particular, were very popular), and books that had previously been banned in the USSR. Oleg Novikov and Andrey Gredasov joined the project. In 1993, the company split: Krasovitsky created the publishing house "Folio", and Novikov and Gredasov - the company "Eksmo", the name of which was formed from the first syllables of the words "Express" and "Moscow".

The business began with wholesale trade in books, later Eksmo had its own printers and distribution. Thanks to the publication of Russian detectives (primarily novels by Danil Koretsky and Alexandra Marinina) in the late 1990s, Eksmo significantly increased its sales and became the basis of a large holding company, which included printing houses, bookstore chain "Bukvoed", publishing houses "Mann, Ivanov and Ferber", "Ventana-Graf", "Drofa" and others. In the 2010s, Oleg Novikov acquired AST publishing house, which, however, remained a formally independent structure. Eksmo is the largest publishing house in Russia, one of the largest publishers in Europe, and is in the world's top 50. It publishes books in all major genres (detectives, fiction, fantasy, classics, modern literature, poetry, books for children, non-fiction), cooperates with many popular Russian and foreign authors.

== Organizational structure ==
Eksmo Publishing House is part of the Eksmo-AST publishing group, in which the two main components are independent of each other and even compete with each other. Along with them, the group includes Mann, Ivanov and Ferber, Ventana-Graf and Drofa. The holding also includes the online store Book24, a distribution network including 10 regional centers, two Cash&Carry stores, and 35 franchise stores across the country. The publishing house has introduced a "divisional system" since 2005: there are three editorial departments, which have actually become specialized publishing houses with a full set of powers:

- Fiction (imprints Inspiria, Fanzon, Like Book, "Comilfo")
- Nonfiction (imprints Bombora, Audrey, Khleb-Sol, Arte, Medprof)
- Children's and teenage literature (imprints Freedom, Eksmodestvo)

As of 2024, Oleg Novikov remains the controlling president and shareholder of the Exmo-AST publishing group. The position of CEO of Eksmo Publishing House is held by Evgeny Kapyev.

== Divisions and imprints ==
=== INSPIRIA ===
The imprint Inspiria as a publishing brand was launched in October 2020. The team of the Eksmo publishing house together with the Higher School of Branding worked on the creation of Inspiria. The main distinguishing feature of Inspiria is the division of the collection of books into sub-brands by genre. Each one has its own colored belly-band. This helps readers to decide which book to choose and find the one that will give pleasure and exciting emotions.

=== BOMBORA ===
Bombora is a non-fiction department of the Publishing House «EKSMO». From 2018 every third non-fiction book in Russia is published by Bombora.

- «Одри» [Audrey] Publishing — an imprint specializing on publishing books for women - on fashion, beauty, style, relationships, harmony and self-actualization.
- «Хлеб-Соль» [Khleb-Sol’] / which means Bread-and-Salt Publishing / — culinary imprint, leader of the culinary book market that publishes Russian and international bestsellers.
- «МедПроф» [Med.Prof.] Publishing — the newest imprint inside BOMBORA. Specializing on publishing books for medical professionals —the most up to date, exclusive scientific information from the worldwide medical community.

== Social responsibility ==
"Eksmo" actively protects the copyrights of writers and takes initiatives to combat online piracy. For example, the publisher's digital books on the VKontakte and Odnoklassniki platforms use a digital imprint mechanism, thanks to which the level of pirated content has decreased 166 times.

In 2019, Eksmo became one of the organizers of the project "Y: Anti-reading" (from the English youth - "youth") - an all-Russian social initiative aimed at popularizing reading among the generation of zoomers. The project was conceived as a conversation with young people in their own language, with well-known bloggers, musicians, and artists acting as "project ambassadors".

== Controversies ==
In 2011 Eksmo received criticism for publishing books which glorify Joseph Stalin and his inner circle, such as Renaissance of Stalin, Beria — the Best Manager of the 20th Century (Берия — лучший менеджер XX века, 2008) by S. Kremlev, and Handbook of a Stalinist (Настольная книга сталиниста, 2010) by Yuri Zhukov. A group of writers and artists, including Alexander Gelman signed an open letter questioning its editorial policy. Oleg Novikov, the director of the publishing house, responded that he felt obligated to cater to the taste of his readers, and not to censor them.

On 14 May 2025, Russian authorities arrested 10 Eksmo employees for alleged "LGBT propaganda" in books. Further raids were conducted in April 2026.

In April 2026, Eksmo’s press office stated that publications would be screened against the criteria of “extremism, foreign agents, LGBT content, pedophilia, discrediting the Russian army, and so on”. Both fiction and non-fiction are affected, such as mentions of “non-traditional relationships” in medical literature, biology textbooks, and biographies. The company stated that previously published books would also be retroactively examined. Tightening of restrictions was in response to the prosecution and sentencing of the directors of publishing houses Popcorn and Individuum for “extremism” over queer literature. Popcorn and Individuum, which had been acquired by Eksmo in September 2023, were shut down in January 2026 and September 2026 respectively.

In a July 2026 interview, Eksmo-AST president Oleg Novikov stated that they had fired employees for refusing to comply with tightened internal censorship rules, alongside numerous resignations.
