= Vadim Panov =

Russian fantasy writer

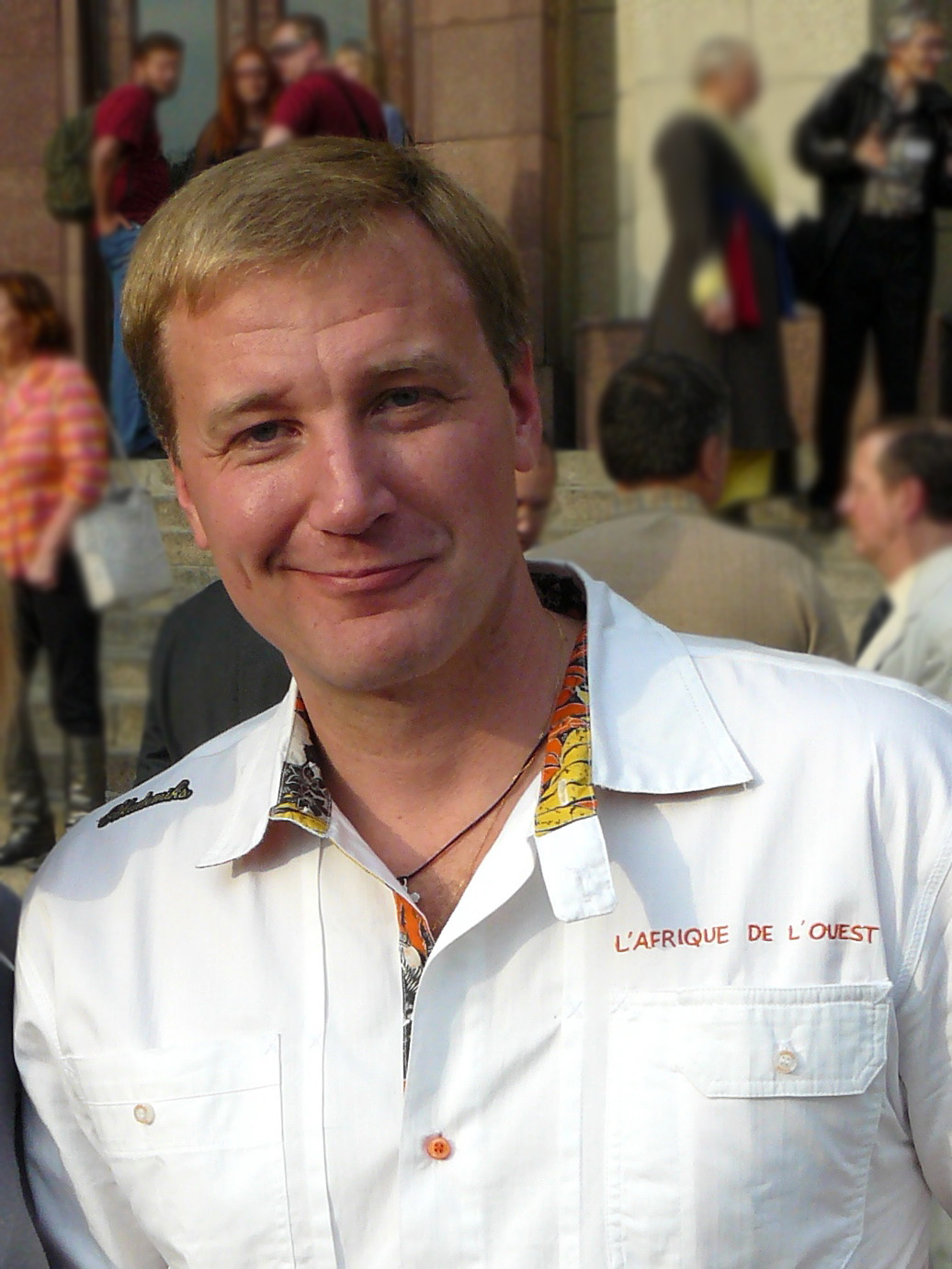
Vadim Panov, 2010

Vadim Panov is a Russian fantasy and science-fiction writer. He is the author of the series Tainy gorod (The Secret City), which has been translated into English, as well as the series Anklavy (Enclaves), and Club Moscow.

Vadim Panov was born on November 15, 1972, into a classic military family. His family was frequently relocated and so he attended many different schools. In 1983, the Panovs moved to Moscow, where, after graduating from school in 1989, Vadim was accepted into the Moscow Aviation Institute (MAI) in the Department of Aircraft Radio Electronics. As a student, he actively participated in the activities of The Mirror, a student theater, where in 1994 the performance of Such Games was staged in 1994 based on his play. It was at MAI that Vadim met his future wife – Natalia. In 1995 Panov graduated from the Moscow Aviation Institute with a degree in radio engineering. Panov’s literary activity began at the age of 29 in 2001 with the publication of his urban fantasy-urban novel Losers Launch Wars, which initiated the Secret City cycle.

Panov said: "I enjoying writing books, and I’m glad that my stories are interesting to many people, because the Secret City was followed by Enclaves and the collection La Mystique De Moscou, a mystical series, which I very much wanted to continue."

The writer actively engages with his readership by holding regular meetings with readers, participating in numerous interviews, and chatting with fans through the forum on his website.

Panov is the father of two daughters, Polina and Irina. During the writing process, his wife, Natalia, is his most incisive critic.

== The Secret Town ==
This series now comprises 14 books:

- Wars Are Started by Losers
- War Commander
- An Attack by the Rules
- All Shades of Black
- There are Heroes in Hell
- The Concubines of Hate
- The Chrysalis of Last Hope
- The Shadow of the Inquisitor
- The Chair of Wanderers
- The Rules of Blood
- The Royal Cross
- The King of Mountain
- The Day of the Dragon
- The Smell of Fear

== The Enclaves ==
This series is a line of cyberpunk novels that now has five books:

- The Moscow Club (2006),
- The Guides on a Crossroad (2006),
- The Bonfires on Altars (2008),
- The Vendors of the Impossible (2009),
- The Chaoperfection (2010).
