= Natalia Alexandrovna Smirnova =

Russian chemical scientist (1933–2023)

Natalya Alexandrovna Smirnova
- Born: January 4, 1933; Saint Petersburg
- Died: March 3, 2023 (aged 90); Saint Petersburg
- Education: Saint Petersburg State University
- Awards: USSR State Prize (1987); Order of Friendship (2003)
- Scientific career
- Fields: Physical chemistry
- Workplaces: Saint Petersburg State University Institute of Chemistry; Saint Petersburg State University
- Doctoral advisor: Alexey Vasilievich Storonkin
- Other academic advisors: Boris Nikolsky; Mikhail Shultz

Natalya Alexandrovna Smirnova (January 4, 1933, Saint Petersburg – March 3, 2023) was a Soviet and Russian chemist. she was head of the Department of Physical Chemistry at St. Petersburg State University, winner of the USSR State Prize, honored employee of Russian higher education also Responsible member of the Federation of the Russian Academy of Sciences (1997).

== Biography ==
Smirnova was born on January 4, 1933, in Leningrad in the family of a military engineer. During the war she was evacuated and returned to Leningrad in 1945. In 1950, she graduated from school with a gold medal and entered the chemistry department of Leningrad State University, where her older sister Elena was already studying. The sisters followed the example of their mother, a graduate of Moscow State University who devoted many years to chemistry. Her husband is architect Valentin Nazarov.

In 1955, she graduated from the Faculty of Chemistry of Leningrad State University, and then completed graduate school there. From 1959 to 1976, she worked first as a junior and then as a senior researcher at the Research Institute of Chemistry at Leningrad State University, combining scientific work with teaching. In 1961 she defended her candidate's dissertation and in 1973 her doctoral dissertation.

Smirnova was since 1976 Professor of the Department of Physical Chemistry at Leningrad (later Saint Petersburg) State University and (since 1997) head of the department. In 1997 she was elected corresponding member of the Russian Academy of Sciences.

== Main publications ==
- Методы статистической термодинамики в физической химии. М., 1973 (2-е изд. — 1982; пер. на польск. яз. — 1980, японск. яз. — 1989).
- Термодинамика разбавленных растворов неэлектролитов. Л., 1982 (в соавторстве).
- Молекулярные теории растворов. Л., 1987.
- Физическая химия. Теоретическое и практическое руководство: Учеб. пособие / Под ред. Б. П. Никольского. Л., 1987 (в соавторстве).
- Термодинамика равновесия жидкость—пар / Под ред. А. Г. Морачевского. Л., 1989 (в соавторстве).
- Quasilattice Equations of State for Molecular Fluids // IUPAC volume «Equations of State for Fluids and Fluid Mixtures» / Ed. by J. V. Sengers, M. V. Ewing, R. F. Kayser, C. J. Peters. Pt. I. Elsevier, 2000 (в соавторстве).
- Фазовое поведение и формы самоорганизации растворов смесей поверхностно-активных веществ (обзор) // Успехи химии. 2005. Т. 74. No. 2.
- Межмолекулярные взаимодействия. Основные понятия. СПб., 2008 (в соавторстве).

== awards ==
- USSR State Prize (1987)
- honored employee of Russian higher education of the Russian Federation” (1999)
- Order of Friendship (2003)
- Prize of St. Petersburg (Leningrad) University for the best scientific works of the year (1976, 1984 and 2004)
- Honorary Professor of St. Petersburg University (2005)
