= Vitaly Bugrov =

Vitaly Bugrov (Russian Виталий Иванович Бугров, 14 May 1938 – 23 June 1994) was a notable Russian science fiction editor, critic, and bibliographer, one of the founders of the Soviet science-fiction fandom.

For many years a science fiction editor of the "Uralsky Sledopyt" (Ural Pathfinder) magazine, Bugrov played the pivotal role in organizing Aelita conventions and establishing the Aelita award in 1980, the only Soviet science fiction award before Perestroika. His articles popularized the early history of science fiction and were collected into two books. Vitaly Bugrov compiled (with Igor Khalymbadzha) model bibliographies of pre-Revolutionary and early Soviet science fiction.

In the 1980s he was a co-winner, with Dmitri Bilenkin, of the Ivan Yefremov Award and won life achievement in the "Velikoye Koltso, The Great Ring Award."

The Bugrov Memorial Award for editorship, criticism, and bibliography in the field of science fiction was established in 2002.

Every year, immediately after the Aelita Science Fiction Convention, fans, writers, and editors visit his grave, clean it, and remember his achievements.
