= Yefremov School =

Russian literary movement

Yefremov School is a literary movement whose representatives, from the second half of the 1970s, gathered around the editorial board for fantasy literature of the publishing house Molodaya Gvardiya, headed by Yuri Medvedev in 1973-1978 and by Vladimir Shcherbakov (who always denied his connection with the "school") in 1978-1992.

In the first half of the 1970s, Soviet literature, both mainstream and fantasy, experienced a split rooted in cultural-ideological (Westerners — Pochvenniki), ideological (Scientism — New Age) and economic spheres: under the conditions of a planned economy, different groups of writers fought for the volume of publishing plans. Molodaya Gvardiya had a virtual monopoly on publishing fiction, and the publishing houses Detskaya Literatura and Znanie had unofficial quotas for publishing fiction. Under Medvedev's leadership, the so-called Yefremov School (the term appeared in the next decade) emerged, named in honour of the science fiction writer I. A. Yefremov, who died in 1972. Medvedev claimed to develop the themes of Yefremov's works, especially those related to ancient history and esotericism. Yefremov School was also the name of the All-Union Creative Association Of Young Fiction Writers of the publishing house Molodaya Gvardiya (existed in 1987-1991), which was opposed by its creators to the "fourth wave" of Soviet fiction associated with the work of Strugatsky.

In the second half of the 1980s, the Yefremov School united about 80% of Soviet science fiction writers, science fiction critics, bibliographers, and activists of amateur science fiction clubs. The literary production of the writers of the Yefremov School received mostly negative reviews from both Soviet and expatriate critics. Alexander Bushkov, Vasily Golovachev and Yuri Nikitin began their writing careers in the Shcherbakov editorial office of the Molodaya Gvardiya, and Vasily Zvyagintsev began his writing career in the All-Union Creative Association Of Young Fiction Writers.

== History ==
=== The Fantastic Literature Department of the Molodaya Gvardiya Publishing House in the 1970s ===
In 1973, Sergei Zhemaitis, head of the fiction department of Molodaya Gvardiya, was replaced by Yuri Medvedev, then a progressive writer who published in Tekhnika Molodezhi. However, his appointment coincided with a sharp change in the Soviet authorities' publishing policy. The peculiarity of this policy in the USSR in the 1950s-1980s was that reprints of authors and works of the "low" genre (science fiction and adventure) were not welcome — organisational and financial barriers prevented this. Under the conditions of the planned economy, reprints were reserved for classical authors. During the Khrushchev-Brezhnev era, fiction was considered as such: Alexei Tolstoy, Alexander Belyaev and later Alexander Grin. By 1977, Ivan Yefremov had officially joined the ranks of the classics. The way out was often the publication of new editions of books, in which Alexander Kazantsev, whose creative style involved constant revision of previous works, was very successful. Works of small and medium size could be republished in author's and collective collections. In addition, from the second half of the 1960s, a generational conflict began to emerge, which also had a thematic dimension: the confrontation between scientific and technological fiction and philosophical fiction. The representatives of the older generation (first and foremost A. Kazantsev) held positions in the Union of Soviet Writers, while the "young" writers (the most prominent of whom were the Strugatskys) had already gained a readership and consolidated themselves on the basis of the publishing house Molodaya Gvardiya. Writers who did not belong to any of the groups and had no patrons (e.g. Yu. Kotlyar) found themselves "on the sidelines" of publishing, but still had the opportunity to criticise in the press.

There was also a personal factor. According to A. Pervushin, Yu. Medvedev's beliefs differed significantly from the Marxist-Leninist ideology (philosophical fiction was an expression of the communist project of the "thaw" period): he clearly followed the line of "neo-pagan esotericism and cosmism", later proclaiming himself the founder of the Yefremov School. According to Yu. Medvedev's doctrine, the Supreme Reason is obliged to be supreme, including moral and ethical qualities, everything in the works should be "incorruptible, harmonious, beautiful, eternal". In this respect, his personal opposition to the publication of the story Roadside Picnic was explained by deep aesthetic and worldview attitudes (the cosmic supercivilisation ignored the Earthlings, leaving our planet literally a garbage dump). Due to the aforementioned peculiarities of the quota system, the number of published books decreased significantly: the Strugatsky brothers were unable to publish their collection of unplanned meetings for seven years (from 1973 to 1980), Vladimir Savchenko scandalously broke off relations with the editorial board, and the manuscript of Dmitri Bilenkin's collection of short stories remained untouched for many years. The number of new editions in the second half of the 1970s barely reached ten. As a result, writers who became popular, especially Kir Bulychev and Olga Larionova, went to magazines and other publishing houses (especially Znanie and Detskaya Literatura). As L. Lobarev noted, in the 1970s it was these two publishing houses that quietly received funds and production facilities for fiction.

=== Late Stagnation Era ===
In 1978 Vladimir Shcherbakov became head of the fiction department of Molodaya Gvardiya. For the previous two and a half years he had been deputy editor-in-chief of Tekhnika Molodezhi, turning (as A. Pervushin put it) a popular-science materialist magazine into a stronghold of esotericism and parascience. The Anthology of Mysterious Cases section, which published material on UFOs, biofields, radio echoes and the hypothetical invention of the laser by Australian Aborigines, became a platform for the magazine's experiments. Science fiction as a genre was extremely popular in the USSR, and its publications had large circulations, so the editorial staff attracted people with unorthodox ideas who had a good chance of getting them out to the public. Vsevolod Revich called this trend (whose representatives, apart from V. Shcherbakov, were Yevgeny Gulyakovsky, Yuri Petukhov and Yuri Nikitin) "zero literature". Even in Yuri Medvedev's time, the Molodaya Gvardiya began publishing the almanacs Mysteries of the Ages and Roads of Millennia, whose regular authors were Valery Skurlatov and Shcherbakov himself, who devoted their works to creating a fantastic history of the ancient Slavs, as well as to fomenting belief in Yeti and aliens, which was seen as a means of distracting young people from pressing social and political problems.

V. Shcherbakov started work on the publication of science fiction, which in quantitative terms returned to the flow of the "boom" period of the 1960s. According to A. Pervushin, Shcherbakov decided to replace the ideological basis of Soviet fiction with the New Age, adapted to the "stagnant" society: "The Soviet version proposed by Shcherbakov was a more primitive mixture of crypto-historical, paleofantastic and occult theories". His connection with the Yefremov School V. Shcherbakov consistently denied. The reference work of late Molodaya Gvardiya fiction was Sergei Pavlov's novel Moon Rainbow, the merits of which were recognised even by the opponents of "zero literature". This novel combined the ideology of extraterrestrial expansion with the New Age promise of changing human nature. "The laboratory for the modification of man as a biological species, which will acquire psychic abilities, should serve as the universe itself". A. Pervushin argued that V. Shcherbakov's editorial policy had great potential. However, he fully followed the line set by Yu. Medvedev, and as a result he himself turned to Russian cosmism, the idea of which had just become widespread at the time of the publication of Lunar Rainbow. Yu. Medvedev, in his story The Cup of Patience (1983), promoted the mystical ideas of the late Tsiolkovsky. Nevertheless, Shcherbakov introduced the informal poet Vyacheslav Nazarov to the masses and also published an experimental novel by Georgy Shakh, There is No Sadder Story in the World (1984). Alexander Bushkov, Vasily Golovachev and Yuri Nikitin began their literary careers in Shcherbakov's editorial office.

=== Perestroika and All-Union Creative Association Of Young Fiction Writers ===
In 1987, the All-Union Creative Association of Young Fiction Writers of the Publishing House Molodaya Gvardiya was founded — the first non-state publishing house in the USSR to specialise in publishing fiction by young authors. It was directed by Vitaly Pishchenko (Novosibirsk). The term Yefremov School appeared in the first collection of the association, Rumba Fantastika, as the name of the thematic section. In four years, the Association published 104 (according to other data, 94) collections containing 723 works by 208 authors; their total circulation amounted to about 11 million copies. In total, the Yefremov School united 250 people — about 80% of Soviet science fiction writers, science fiction critics, bibliographers, and activists of amateur science fiction clubs.

In the thematic volume of the Library of Science Fiction published in 1993, the author of the preface —cosmonaut V. Sevostyanov— dated the formation of the community of students and followers of I. A. Yefremov to the 1980s, and named his direct students — Gennady Prashkevich and Eugene Gulyakovsky. The Yefremov School included Y. Glazkov, E. Grushko, E. Gulyakovsky, O. Korabelnikov, V. Rybin, M. Pukhov, E. Sych, Y. Tupitsyn and many others among the authors presented in the Association's collections. One of the permanent seminars of young Siberian novelists included about fifty people. As the critic O. Dryabina (secretary of the Association of Science Fiction Writers) noted, it is not necessary to call all of them consistent and direct followers of the literary tradition of I. Yefremov and his ideological positions. The leadership of the Association preferred to emphasize the principles of "humanism, social optimism, no embellishment of the future, but a careful study of tomorrow, which is being created today and now". The critic Vasily Vladimirsky argued that the Association "practically did not introduce any new big names, but readily gave a platform (and thus brought them to the next level) to authors who had made their debut in the pages of newspapers and provincial magazines in previous years". Vasily Zvyagintsev was almost the only exception, debuting with stories and then the first novel of the epic Ulysses Leaves Ithaca, published in parts.

In July 1988, the Association held its first all-Union seminar. In November 1988, the Association provoked the last major literary conflict in the history of the USSR, when Yuri Medvedev's story Proteus veiled accusations against the Strugatskys that it was they who, through their denunciation, had organised a search of Ivan Yefremov's apartment a month after the writer's death. In 1989, Yuri Medvedev tried to liquidate the Council for Adventure and Fantastic Literature of the Union of Writers of the RSFSR (of which Arkady Strugatsky was a member of the board). The formal reason for this was that Kir Bulychev, who headed the Council at the time, was not a member of the Union of Soviet Writers. There was also a significant anti-Semitic subtext. The Strugatskys responded with a harsh open letter, and similar appeals were made by Svyatoslav Loginov, Anton Molchanov (Ant Skalandis) and the All-Union Council of Science Fiction Amateur Clubs. In protest, Alexander Mirer took away the manuscript that had been submitted to the Association for publication. The conflict was exhausted after the collapse of the planned economy, the disintegration of the USSR and all command and administrative literary and publishing structures, and had practically no effect on the creative fate of its participants. At the beginning of the 1990s, the Association no longer needed to cooperate with the Molodaya Gvardiya; according to V. Vladimirsky, the split took place "quietly, without noise and dust, without loud manifestos and mutual accusations".

Vasily Vladimirsky claimed that the Association 'caught the spirit of the times' and promptly saturated the market with fantastic collections, 'often uneven... but in competitive quantities'. Vitaly Pishchenko's publishing house ceased to exist in 1992 "solely due to the economic and political force majeure of the post-perestroika era". The Association's seminar moved to Tiraspol in 1989, and a total of 25 all-Union and international events were held between 1988 and 1995. The critics D. Baikalov and A. Sinitsyn noted that the Association "brought to the people" about half of all fiction writers published in the next decade. The Association held free seminars where budding writers "looked at each other, read manuscripts and began to realise that they were 'not trembling creatures, and have the right', and if you add this and royalties ...". At the festival Fancon-95 V. Pishchenko was awarded a prize for the development of Russian-language fantasy fiction.

== Literary features ==
=== Context: two "fourth waves" ===
The literary researcher E. Kovtun has pointed out that the state control over the publication of fiction in the USSR from the 1950s to the 1980s led to a sharp restriction of the genre and thematic composition of fantastic prose and the consolidation of a certain canon in the reader's consciousness. The only possible type of narrative about the extraordinary became rational fiction (science fiction), supported by critics and writers themselves, including those in opposition to the authorities. The westernised wing of writers (to use D. Volodikhin's terminology) itself developed a certain stereotype that only science fiction ("hard") is the only kind of fantastic literature. The "young patriots", who were attracted to the publishing house Molodaya Gvardiya, were condemned, among other things, for themes related to Slavic-Russian folklore and genre experiments. In other words, the predominance of one type of narrative about the extraordinary over the rest inevitably affected the state of fiction as a whole. Closure within the framework of science fiction inevitably led to a narrowing of the field of problems and a lowering of the artistic level. "Stagnation" in Soviet fantasy fiction after the 1960s was also explained by the exhaustion of the main problem-thematic circle: a consistent picture of a happy future, mutual understanding with other inhabitants of the universe, the introduction of technical innovations into everyday life, the predominance of intellectuals engaged in spiritual creativity in society, and so on. The way out of the crisis by expanding the genre boundaries was extremely difficult, because due to the dominance of the rational-atheistic worldview and commitment to "serious" values, the literary authorities did not welcome fantasy, space operas, or action movie. In this context, the internal review by A. P. Kazantsev on the first collection of Yevgeny and Lyubov Lukin's You and No One Else (1983), which expressed the claim that "the stories... have nothing to do with science fiction, they do not call the reader anywhere, do not infect him with ideas, do not excite his craving for knowledge, do not direct the paths of young people to technological institutes".

In 2000, science fiction writer Ant Skalandis analyzed this situation "from the inside", from the position of a professional writer. From his point of view, science fiction was a complex socio-cultural phenomenon of the 20th century, a literary reaction to the Technological Revolution, political confrontation on a global scale, and eschatological expectations. Its principal difference from other areas of literature was an attempt to comprehend the world using the methods of modern science. This direction ceased to exist approximately by the 1990s ("as the era of romantic or gothic novels once ended"), which can be easily traced in the creative evolution of the Strugatskys.

In this respect, the "fourth wave" of Soviet fiction, represented by writers born in the 1950s, had a difficult fate. In the 1970s, the capital's literary milieu, both in mainstream and fantasy literature, was experiencing a split, or at least disunity, amid the struggle for publishing limits between representatives of different generations and ideological currents. The editorial staff of Molodaya Gvardiya deliberately disassociated itself from the authors of the "fourth wave"; until 1990, none of the representatives of this literary generation were published in the Library of Soviet Fiction series. At the same time, the authorities did not prohibit the activity of seminars for science fiction writers in Moscow (headed by D. A. Bilenkin) and Leningrad (Boris Strugatsky's seminar), as well as in the periphery (in Baku, Tomsk, and other cities). The seminars operated on a voluntary basis, had no official status, and had no influence on publishing policy, although the Moscow seminar actively cooperated with the Znanie publishing house, which had an unofficial quota for fiction. The participants of the seminars, who had no opportunity to publish, improved their professional skills and wrote mostly "for the drawer". Many of them were members of science fiction clubs, gaining a small but involved community of readers. These features predetermined the failure of the "fourth wave": after the advent of market freedom, "it became possible and even 'fashionable' not to be ashamed of one's own — any! — literary preferences". Semi-dissident intellectual texts were not interesting to the general public, and very few could compete with the flow of translated Western literature.

=== "Zero Literature" ===
Israeli critic Maya Kaganskaya (1938–2011) presented an in-depth analysis of the Yefremov School. In her opinion, this "school" was formed immediately when I. A. Yefremov was recognized as a classic of science fiction. At the same time, the literary production of Yefremov's disciples clearly differed from both the earlier texts of the 1960s and the works of the new generation of science fiction writers who did not belong to this group:

It is easy to recognize Yefremov's disciples by the special, shaky atmosphere inherent in their works, with a deliberately blurred, almost impossible-to-retell plot. To an untrained reader, some of these texts can give the impression of almost paranoid delirium: amorphous narrative, vague hints, a multitude of partially expanded quotations overloaded with the names of great creators of the past and present (philosophers, poets, artists, composers), while all this cultural abundance is strangely and distressingly accompanied by poor, sometimes illiterate Russian language and a lack of literary merit.

The sharp decline in the literary level of Molodaya Gvardiya's output in the 1980s was noted by practically all fiction critics. For example, Nina Chemodanova (under the pseudonym K. Milov) lamented that once each of the new Molodaya Gvardiya “Fantastica” collections had become an event, “a holiday for the reader,” while later there was a degradation. The critic also wondered what made writers “chase” their heroes from modernity to the distant past and partly attributed this to the influence of Western fiction of the time. Roman Arbitman characterized Shcherbakov's production of the 1980s in much the same way: “Since the early 1980s, none of the readers expect pleasant surprises from these collections; there are almost no living texts left here. Technophobia, anti-Westernism, idealization of the patriarchal Dalek, and Fomenko's new chronology (Homer and Russian Boyan are one and the same person) brought to complete absurdity have become the order of the day".

Vsevolod Revich returned to the statement about the purely craft helplessness of “zero literature”, bordering on graphomania. Several critics called Dmitry De-Spiller one of the most odious writers of the Yefremov School. V. Revich pointed out that Yu. Medvedev, in the preface to the collection of stories by De-Spiller, Singing Rocks, actually committed an act of exposure, noting that the plots of the stories are monotonous and the characters are completely devoid of individuality, depersonalized, resembling robots in their rationality. However, it is also stated here that “mastery of literary skill is a secondary matter; for a fiction writer, ‘paradoxicality’ is more important". V. Revich evaluated V. Shcherbakov's novel Seven Elements harshly. The novel, which takes place two hundred years later, contains no information about the social “harmony” there, nor about the way in which it was achieved. Moreover, “in this hypothetical society, legends arise on every occasion, so that one cannot help but wonder whether humanity has not returned to the mythological level of understanding reality”. The main action in the novel, Revich reduced to the amorous adventures of journalist Gleb, which he described in the most sarcastic way: “The hero appeared on a date with the lady of his heart, and in her place was another, which was discovered only, how can I put it mildly, after the ceremony.” A project to capture solar energy to heat ocean water is called “environmentally monstrous”. Revich's outrage was sparked by a scene in which Gleb peeks at his lover while bathing. The review of the novel concludes with a rhetorical question: “Why did the author need to climb so far over the ridges of the ages? Because to abuse the oceans, unfortunately, manages in our time, as well as peeping at girls bathing, if, of course, there is a severe need for this event?” Shcherbakov responded to the criticism by claiming that her motivation was a desire to “settle scores,” that Gleb loved the object of his contemplation, and that solar energy was “the most environmentally friendly.” The critic was accused of misrepresenting the plot of the book in the retelling. At that time, Shcherbakov probably feared not so much condemnation of his weak writing skills as accusations of “immorality.” The exchange of harsh words between Revich and Shcherbakov touched even the science fiction fan clubs and was reflected in articles by Sergei Pereslegin (Science Fiction and the Process of Cognition) and Vadim Kazakov (On the Principles of Zero-Polemics), which simultaneously appeared in the fanzine Oversan (1988, No. 2). Arkady Strugatsky, in a report at the plenum of the Council for Adventure and Science Fiction Literature at the Union of Writers of the USSR (May 1986), stated with utmost frankness that “writing is worse than writing... V. Shcherbakov's Seven Elements is an occupation for potboilers!”

Critic V. Vladimirsky, regarding subsequent publications of the Association, pointed out:

The authors were not united by common motifs, common themes, or favorite plot moves. The collections of the All-Union Creative Association were striking above all for their aesthetic eclecticism: it was as if someone had scattered Soviet fantasy books from the 1920s, 1950s, and 1970s and reassembled them in a random sequence. Translucent inventors broadcast about marvelous inventions that would change the world forever, spaceships traversed the vastness of the solar system, and representatives of special services with tired and kind eyes investigated paranormal phenomena—today, the names of most of these writers will not be remembered even by a bibliophile.

=== Yefremov School mythology ===
Philosopher and publicist Boris Mezhuev, quoting Fr. Seraphim (Rose), called science fiction anti-Christian crypto-religion, which can be considered in the context of the cult of UFOs or psychics. In summary, we can say that the most important theme of science fiction literature of the 20th century was the collision of mankind with a new reality, “the unexpected discovery of which seemed to complete the process of destruction of traditional religious beliefs and the social ethics based on them.” Accordingly, this did not exclude “grasping” in figurative form the most important social modern trends.

According to M. Kaganskaya, the marker of Yefremov School is the transfer of interest in the future to the past, which is unusual for science fiction. Analogues of this phenomenon can be traced in the West, where, in the 1970s, a science fiction movement focused on cultural studies and cultural anthropology took shape. However, the context is quite different: interest in the Russian past “within the framework of official Soviet culture... made it possible to consolidate the Russian nationalist and chauvinistic public, and outside Soviet culture — to contrast Russian history with the Soviet history that ruined it". Yefremov's disciples chose as the main subject of their description “the twilight of prehistory”, archaic, which appears as “a testing ground for the testing and realization of historiosophic concepts that cannot be developed on the available historical material”. Plot diversity hides a primitive black-and-white scheme of the struggle between Light and Darkness. Even in V. Nazarov's The Silay Apple, there is an inversion of the situation in Strugatsky's story It's Hard to be a God. The hero is taken to a distant planet, where the Great Ruler reigns, with features of biography and personality reminiscent of Stalin. Likewise for Strugatsky, the hero —an inspector of the Earth security service— faces an atypically unfolding revolutionary situation and discovers that the dictator is nothing more than a front man for the true power of the Order of the Astute. The revolution did not start because of real social contradictions, but only because of the turmoil unleashed by the Order of Disturbances. The members of the Order are labeled by the use of “Russian-Jewish” language oriented to Babel's techniques.

V. Shcherbakov's novel A Cup of Storms is even more demonstrative: it is extremely easy to distinguish the bearers of Good (descendants of Etruscans) from the descendants of Atlanteans, agents of Evil. It turns out that humanity is divided into blue-eyed blondes (Etruscans) and black-eyed brunettes (Atlanteans). The brunettes have “shaded, swollen, as if strained eyelids” and bulging eyes that are “as if in front of the face”. No less important an identifying feature is the nose: bearers of a high back of the nose are descendants of Atlanteans, while persons with a medium back of the nose are of the Etruscan type. There is also erotic rivalry as a symbol of the struggle for the purity and soul of the race: a certain visiting gastroller makes an attempt on the hero's bride, “a marvelous blond Etruscan”. Closer to the finale of the novel, it turns out that against the protagonist-archaeologist, against world science, and all progressive humanity, there is a cosmic conspiracy. Etruscans—an ancient people, ancestors of modern Russians. After the destruction of Atlantis, Etruscans-Protoslavs settled on a far planet; Cosmic Etruria is the heavenly patroness of present Russia. The whole history of mankind stands under the sign of a global prehistoric conflict of two races, Etruscans and Atlanteans. This kind of detail allowed M. Kaganskaya to call the novel “delirious”. At the same time, Shcherbakov is recognized as the closest to the founder of the school —Ivan Yefremov— “by the magnitude of the problems posed and a somewhat crazy way of their intellectual and literary solution".

In the collection Seeker (1982), A. Serba's story To No Enemy saw the light, the action of which is attributed to the moment of revenge of Princess Olga to Drevlians, who killed Igor. Khazars are depicted as a greater threat to Russia than the Varangians and Byzantines. A Khazar lazutnik, seeking to make representatives of his people “head and mind” of the Slavs, sows discord between the princely court and the vigilantes (between power and “citizens”), decomposes, corrupts, sells, and betrays, until he dies at the hands of a simple Kievan warrior. Closer to the finale, the metahistorical meaning of the events described in the story becomes clear: Svyatoslav destroys the Khazar Khaganate, and Slavic warriors plow up “the place of the brigand capital”. As it is known, on the site of the destroyed Carthage, Roman soldiers plowed a furrow, and the same fate befell Jerusalem after the Jewish Wars. A. Serba does not hide that Kievan Rus and its heir, Russia, is a reincarnation of the Roman Empire, and the Khazar Khaganate is a new Judea. This kind of historical inconsistency is a manifestation of a single concept adopted in the Yefremov School: all Indo-European paganism is considered a single religious and ethical system of Slavic origin.

Maya Kaganskaya considered all “waves” of Soviet fiction as literary responses to the real situation, where writers strive to teach readers to consider and experience the problems of society. The fiction of the 1960s operated in the direct perspective of the future and in the reverse perspective of the past; that is, history and space are inseparable, serving as symbols of the times and spaces in which the responsible individual operates. M. Kaganskaya called Yefremov's fantasy fiction of the 1980s a direct reaction to the fiction of the sixties. There are also parallels in mainstream Soviet prose: the novel-essay by V. Chivilikhin, Memory, published in 1981–1985, in six million copies, contains “not only a full set of ideas of Yefremov's disciples, but also whole pages verbatim reproducing their theoretical reasoning". The historian N. A. Mitrokhin associated I. A. Yefremov himself with these tendencies. On the contrary, historian and fiction writer V. V. Komissarov noted that as a separate direction, Yefremov School was formed in the 1970s and had virtually nothing to do with Ivan Antonovich himself.

== Bibliography ==
- Ant Skalandis (2000). Романтика кризиса [Romance of crisis] (in Russian). Техника — молодёжи. pp. 50–52.
- Baykalov D., Sinitsyn A. (2000). Ровесники фантастики // Фантастика 2000 / Сост. Н. Науменко [Peers of Fiction // Fiction 2000]. Звёздный лабиринт (in Russian). М.: АСТ. pp. 499–520. ISBN 5-237-00890-9
- Vladimirsky, V. (2021). Две «четвёртых волны». Последнее поколение советской фантастики [Two "fourth waves". The last generation of Soviet science fiction] (in Russian). Мир фантастики. pp. 142–149.
- Dryabina, O. V. (2007). Библиография изданий ВТО МПФ (1988—1994) // Русская фантастика на перекрестье эпох и культур: Материалы Международной научной конференции 21-23 марта 2006 года [Bibliography of the All-Union Creative Association Of Young Fiction Writers' publications (1988-1994)] (in Russian). М.: Изд. Московского университета. pp. 497–536. ISBN 978-5-211-05446-2.
- Dryabina, O. V. (2012). Литературные наследники И. Ефремова? «Школа Ефремова» в 1980—1990-е гг. // Иван Ефремов и русский космизм: сб. науч. ст. / редкол.: Е. А. Трофимова (отв. ред.) [и др.] [Bibliography of the All-Union Creative Association Of Young Fiction Writers' publications (1988-1994)Literary heirs of I. Yefremov? Yefremov School in the 1980s-1990s] (in Russian). СПб.: СПбГИЭУ. pp. 222–225. ISBN 978-5-9978-0564-7.
- Kaganskaya, M. L. (1987). Миф двадцать первого века, или Россия во мгле. Часть II [Myth of the twenty-first century, or Russia in the darkness. Part II] (in Russian). Страна и мир. pp. 131–140.
- Kovtun, Е. N. (2008). Художественный вымысел в литературе XX века: учебное пособие для студентов, обучающихся по направлению 031000 и специальности 031001 «Филология» [Artistic fiction in the literature of the 20th century: textbook for students studying in the direction 031000 and speciality 031001 ‘Philology’] (in Russian). М.: Высш. шк. p. 405. ISBN 978-5-06-005661-7.
- Komissarov, V. V. (2010). Научно-фантастическая литература в жизни советской интеллигенции 1940—1980-х годов: некоторые социально-исторические аспекты [Science fiction literature in the life of the Soviet intelligentsia 1940-1980s: some socio-historical aspects] (in Russian). Иваново: ПресСто. p. 103. ISBN 978-5-903595-69-3.
- Lobaryov, L. V. (9 September 2023). История советской фантастики. Большая российская энциклопедия: научно-образовательный портал (9 September 2023) [History of Soviet science and fantasy. Big Russian Encyclopaedia: scientific and educational portal] (in Russian).
- Mezhuyev, B. Тайна «Мира Полдня» [The Mystery of the World of Noon] (in Russian). Гефтер (28 November 2012).
- Mitrokhin, N. A. (2013). «Антисионисты» и неоязычники в русском националистическом движении СССР 1960-х — 1970-х гг [Antizionists and neo-pagans in the Russian nationalist movement of the USSR in the 1960s-1970s]. Форум новейшей восточноевропейской истории и культуры (in Russian). Русское издание. pp. 214–232.
- Pervushin, A. (2021). Меж плюсом и минусом. Краткая история главной фантастической редакции страны [Between Plus and Minus. A brief history of the country's main fiction editorial board] (in Russian). Мир фантастики. pp. 102–108.
- Revich, V. A. (1998). Нуль-литература // Перекрёсток утопий. Судьбы фантастики на фоне судеб страны [Zero Literature // Crossroads of Utopias. Fates of fiction against the background of the country's fates] (in Russian). М.: ИВ РАН. pp. 287–310.
- Sevostyanov, V. (1993). "Школа Ефремова, (предисловие)". Советская фантастика 80-х годов. Книга 1 / Сост. Е. Гуляковский [Soviet science fiction of the 1980s]. Библиотека фантастики (08/1) (in Russian). М.: Дружба народов. pp. 5–8. ISBN 5-285-00008-4
- Shnirelman, V. A. (2015). Арийский миф в современном мире / Виктор Шнирельман [The Aryan myth in the modern world / Victor Shnirelman]. Библиотека журнала «Неприкосновенный запас» (in Russian). Vol. 1. М.: Новое литературное обозрение. ISBN 978-5-4448-0277-9.
