= Vladislav Krapivin =

Soviet and Russian writer (1938–2020)

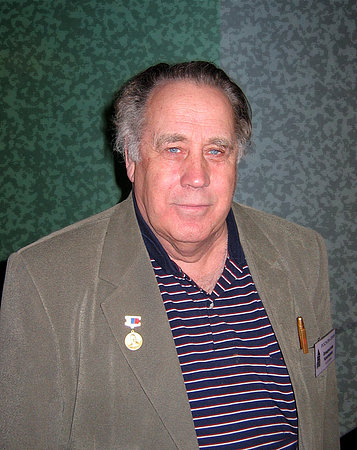
Vladislav Krapivin

Vladislav Petrovich Krapivin (Russian: Владислав Петрович Крапивин; 14 October 1938 – 1 September 2020) was a Soviet and Russian children's books writer.

== Biography ==
Vladislav Petrovich Krapivin was born in the city of Tyumen on 14 October 1938. He received a degree in journalism from the Ural State University. In the course of his studies, he started working at the newspaper "Evening Sverdlovsk", followed by several years in the periodical "Ural Pathfinder". Krapivin has been a full-time writer since 1965. His first book, The Voyage of Orion (Рейс "Ориона"), was printed by the Sverdlovsk Publishing House in 1962. Over the course of his literary career, Krapivin became the author of more than 200 publications, many of which have been translated.

In 1961 Vladislav Krapivin founded a youth group called "Caravel" with the main activities for the kids that of journalism, fencing, sailing and all things maritime. "Caravel" exists to this day, led by its former graduates.

On 1 September 2020, Vladislav Krapivin died at the age of 81 in Yekaterinburg, where he had lived since 2013. He had been in hospital with pneumonia since 10 August, before his condition deteriorated.

== Awards and honors ==
- Laureate of the Lenin Komsomol Prize; literary award Aelita; the Arkady Gaidar Award and many others. Orders: Order of the Red Banner of Labour, Order of Friendship of Peoples. Medals: "For Valiant Labor", awarded by VLKSM (KomSoMol). Honorary citizen of Yekaterinburg.
- Asteroid 407243 Krapivin, discovered by Timur Kryachko at the Zelenchukskaya Station in 2009, was named in his honor. The official naming citation was published by the Minor Planet Center on 14 November 2016 (M.P.C. 102259).

== Bibliography ==
- "Meeting My Brother"
- August, the Month of Winds, 1975, (Та сторона, где ветер, 1967)
