= Evgeny Lukin =

Russian science fiction writer

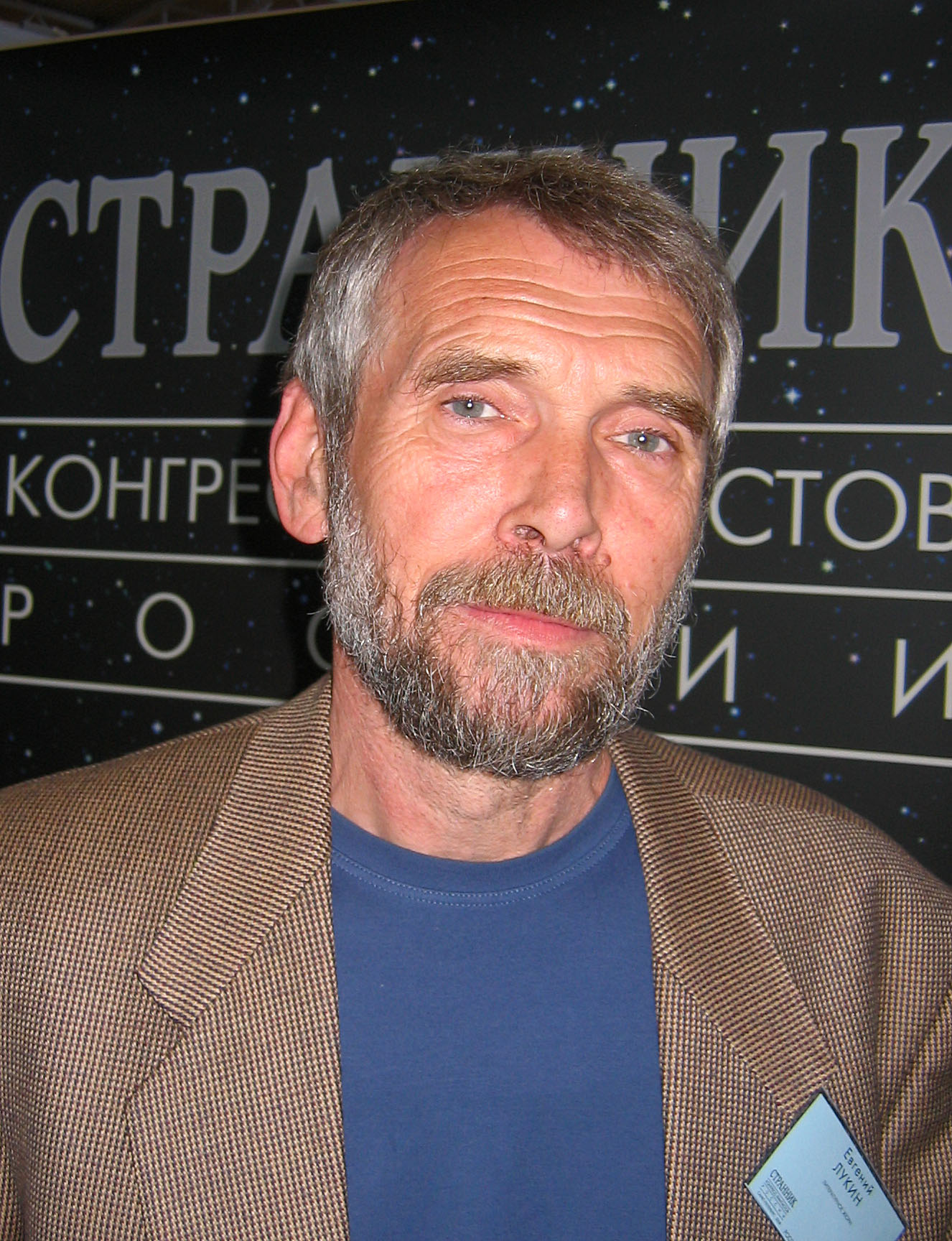
- Evgeny Lukin in 2008
- Born: March 5, 1950; Chkalov, Russian SFSR, Soviet Union
- Education: Volgograd Pedagogical Institute
- Occupations: Writer, philologist
- Writing career
- Genres: Science fiction, fantasy, satire, historical fiction
- Notable awards: Aelita Prize 2002
- Website: author.today/u/bakluzhino

Evgeny Yuryevich Lukin (Russian: Евгений Юрьевич Лукин) (born March 5, 1950) is a Russian writer. He writes mostly science fiction and fantasy. In the past his co-author was his wife, Lyubov Lukina.

== Biography ==
Lukin's mother was a theater actress and his father was an honored artist of the Turkmen SSR and served as the chief director of the Russian Drama Theater in Ashgabat for several years.

Lukin pursued his education in philology at the Faculty of History and Philology at the Volgograd Pedagogical Institute. During his studies, he met his future wife, Lyubov Belonozhkina. The couple married in 1972, shortly after their graduation. Lukin briefly worked as a teacher at a village school in the Kamyshinsky district of the Volgograd region from 1972 to 1973. He then served in the Soviet Army near Tashkent. After his discharge, he returned to Volgograd with his wife, where their son Yuri was born in 1974.

Together with his wife, Lukin began writing science fiction stories. In 1981, their story "Vacation and the Photographer" (Каникулы и фотограф) was published in the newspaper "Evening Volgograd" (Вечерний Волгоград). Since then, the Lukins have been regularly published in newspapers, magazines, and collections, including "Znanie – Sila", "Vokrug sveta", "Soviet Literature", and others. Their works have been translated into several languages.

In 1990, the author duo received a prize at Eurocon and were admitted to the Union of Soviet Writers. Since 1993, Yevgeny Lukin has continued to write on his own. Lyubov Lukina died on May 14, 1996.

Lukin has since focused more on novel writing. In addition to novels, Lukin publishes poetry in various collections, including "Porcelain Speech" (Фарфоровая речь) and "Devil's Owl" (Чёртова сова). He also produces albums featuring his own songs and translates works of international science fiction authors, such as Piers Anthony and Barbara Hambly.

=== Novels ===
- 1990: Missionaries
  The Lukin couple received the "Encouragement Award" at Eurocon-1990 for the novel
- 1997: Гений кувалды (The Genius of the Sledgehammer)
- 1997: The Robber's Wicked Moon
  German translation: Unter dem Räubermond, 2013
  A mistaken-identity adventure fantasy / quest novel: a desert nomad Ar-Sharlachi is confused with a notorious bandit Scharlach and the ruler sends him on a quest to find access to the sea, but his travel with the lover of an actual bandit, makes various turns, and Ar-Sharlachi even becomes a leader of the rebelling in the "Land of Nodding Hammers" (derricks) against a superior power who plunders the natural resources of the locals.
- 1998: Зона справедливости (The Zone of Justice)
- 1998: Катали мы ваше солнце (We Rolled Your Sun)
- 1999: Алая аура протопарторга (The Crimson Aura of the Proto-Partorg)
  A political satire urban fantasy novel.

== Awards and decorations ==
Lukin is a recipient of a number of literary awards, including:

- 1990: Eurocon award
- 2002: Aelita Prize

In 2011 he was awarded with the Medal of the Order "For Merit to the Fatherland" of II Degree for "the merits in the development of the national culture and arts, and many years of fruitful activity".
