= Sannikov =

Sannikov (Russian: Санников) is a Russian masculine surname derived from the word sannik, sledge-maker; its feminine counterpart is Sannikova. It is transliterated in German as Sannikoff and in Belarusian as Sannikau. Notable people with the surname include:

- Alena Sannikova (born 1980), Belarusian cross country skier
- Andrei Sannikov (born 1954), Belarusian opposition activist
- Dmitri Sannikov (born 1983), Russian professional football player
- Mikhail Sannikov (born 1961), Russian buddhist lama
- Pelageya Shajn (née Sannikova 1894–1956), Russian astronomer
- Yakov Sannikov (1780-c. 1812), Russian explorer
- Yuliy Sannikov (born 1978), Ukrainian economist

== See also ==
- Sannikov Land, phantom island named after the explorer
- Sannikov Strait, strait in Russia named after the explorer
