= Vasili Golovachyov =

Russian writer (1948–2025)

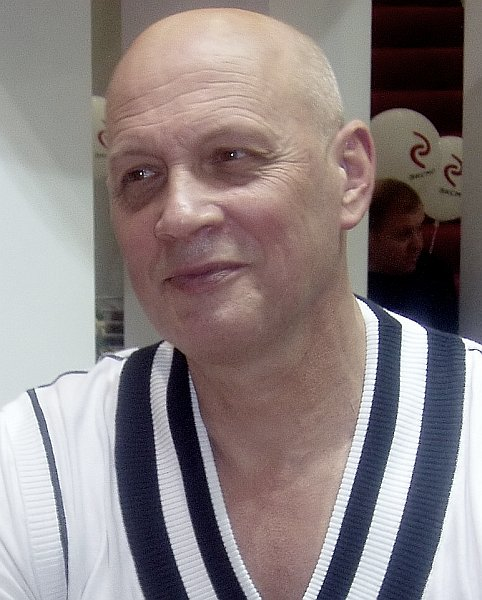
Golovachyov in 2008

Vasili Vasilievich Golovachyov (Russian: Василий Васильевич Головачёв; 21 June 1948 – 7 September 2025) was a Soviet and Russian science fiction writer, known in Russian-speaking countries for writing both hard science fiction and sci-fi-fantasy mixes. His fantasy works combine space science fiction, esotericism, Slavic neopaganism, hardcore Russian nationalism bordering with xenophobia and alternate history bordering with pseudohistory.

== Life and career ==
Golovachev made his debut in 1969 with the short story “Evolution”. He became known all over the USSR thanks to his debut novel Relic (first published in Ukrainian) (1981) and short and medium-form works published in the 1970s, later combined in the collection Unforeseen Encounters (1979).

In 2004, he was awarded the Aelita Prize.

In 2008, on the occasion of the writer's 60th birthday, the book Vasili Golovachev. A Man of Purpose, which included interviews with the writer, his wife, as well as the writer's correspondence with admirers of his talent on his website, and prefaces to his books, compiled by a Russian science fiction writer and literary critic of the genre Gennady Prashkevich.

Golovachev died after a long illness, of heart attack in a reanimation facility on 7 September 2025, at the age of 77.

== Works ==
- The Beast's Gospel ("Евангелие от зверя") series
  - The Beast's Lair ("Логово зверя")
  - The Exodus of the Beast ("Исход зверя")
  - The Taming of the Beast ("Укрощение зверя")
- The Forbidden Reality ("Запрещенная реальность") series
  - The Loner ("Одиночка")
  - SMERSH-2 ("Смерш-2")
  - The Interceptor ("Перехватчик")
  - Third-Level Trouble ("Разборки третьего уровня")
  - Breaking the Evil ("Излом зла")
  - Exterminator of the Law ("Истребитель закона")
  - Tornado ("Смерч")
- Catharsis ("Катарсис") series
  - And the Retribution Is with Me (Man of Combat) ("И возмездие со мною [Человек боя]")
  - Battlefield ("Поле боя")
  - The Fight Is not Eternal ("Бой не вечен")
  - I Guarantee Life ("Гарантирую жизнь")
- Don't Wake the Sleeping Genies ("Не будите спящих джиннов") series
  - The Sleeping Genie ("Спящий джинн")
  - The Cemetery of Genies ("Кладбище джиннов")
  - The War with Genies ("Война с джиннами")
  - The Return of the Genie ("Возвращение джинна")
- The Saviors of the Fan ("Спасатели Веера") series
  - The Envoy ("Посланник") – Nikita Sukhov is an unintentional witness of the liquidation of the Envoy of the Forces of Light on Earth. Barely escaping alive himself, he realizes that he is now a target of the otherworldly assassins and can die at any moment. His only choice is to accept the challenge and become the new Envoy on the dangerous Path of the Sword in the Worldfan.
  - The Deliverer ("Избавитель") – the collapse of the Worldfan threatens to destroy every living thing in the Multiverse. The heroes have an uneasy task ahead of them - to face the forces of Darkness and cross the chrons of the Fan. They must fight treacherous enemies, including Lucifer himself, aid the Seven Mages in their struggle against the Great Igvas, and prevent the Evil from altering all reality.
- Relict ("Реликт") series
  - Unforeseen Meetings ("Непредвиденные встречи")
  - Relict. Volume I ("Реликт. Том 1")
  - The Coming ("Пришествие")
  - The Return of the Wandering Constructor ("Возвращение блудного Конструктора")
  - Children of Eternity ("Дети Вечности")
  - Counter-intelligence ("Контрразведка")
  - The Law of Change ("Закон перемен")
  - The Absolute Player ("Абсолютный игрок")
- The Solo on the Broken String ("Соло на оборванной струне")
- The Vague Time ("Смутное время") series
  - The Scourge of Times ("Бич времен")
  - Cache ("Схрон")
  - The Executioner of Times ("Палач времен")
  - Magatsitls ("Магацитлы")
- The Adventures of Denis Molodtsov ("Приключения Дениса Молодцова")
- RTH, or Rule of Times of Harmony ("ВВГ, или Власть Времен Гармонии")
- To the Time of My Tears ("Ко времени моих слёз")
- Special Control ("Особый контроль")
- Regulum ("Регулюм")
- The Ruthless ("Беспощадный")
- The Masters ("Владыки")
- Demon ("Демон")
- Death Preserve ("Заповедник смерти")
- Kali Yuga ("Калиюга")
- Can Opener ("Консервный нож")
- The Corrector ("Корректировщик")
- Cryptozoy ("Криптозой")
- Deviation to Perfection ("Отклонение к совершенству")
- The Piranhas ("Пираньи")
- The Black Force ("Черная сила")
- The Black Time ("Черное время")
- The Black Man ("Черный человек")
- Sentenced to Light ("Приговоренные к свету")
- The Tree of Disappearing Times ("Древо исчезающих времен")
- The Edge of the World ("Край света")
- Fight without Rules ("Бой без правил")
- The War of Realities ("Война реальностей")
- Contacts of the Special Kind ("Контакты особого рода")
- The Face of the Demon ("Лик беса")
- The Rules of Combat ("Правила боя")
- The Predicted ("Предсказанное")
- The Heart of the Universe ("Сердце Вселенной")
- The Seekers of Death ("Искатели смерти")
- On the Other Side of the Fire ("По ту сторону огня")
- The Phantasms ("Фантазмы")
- Who Are We? Why Are We? The Experiment of Transpersonal Perception ("Кто мы? Зачем мы? Опыт трансперсонального восприятия")
- The Land of Wonders ("Земля чудес")
- The Devil's Fire Extinguisher ("Огнетушитель дьявола")
- Invasion into Reality ("Вторжение в реальность")
- Ultimatum ("Ультиматум")
- The Fourth Dimension ("Четвертое измерение")
- The Silver Time ("Серебряное время")
- The Masters of Reality ("Владыки реальности")
- The Extinguishers of the Suns ("Гасители солнц")
- Overcoming the Impossible ("Преодоление невозможного")
- Chronotwist ("Хроновыверт")
- The Compressed Spring ("Сжатая пружина")
- The Beyond ("Запределье")
- Requiem to the Time Machine ("Реквием машине времени")
- The Divinator ("Прорицатель")
- The War of Absolutes ("Война абсолютов")
- Playing with Fire ("Игра с огнем")
