= Svyatoslav Loginov =

Russian writer

Svyatoslav Vitman
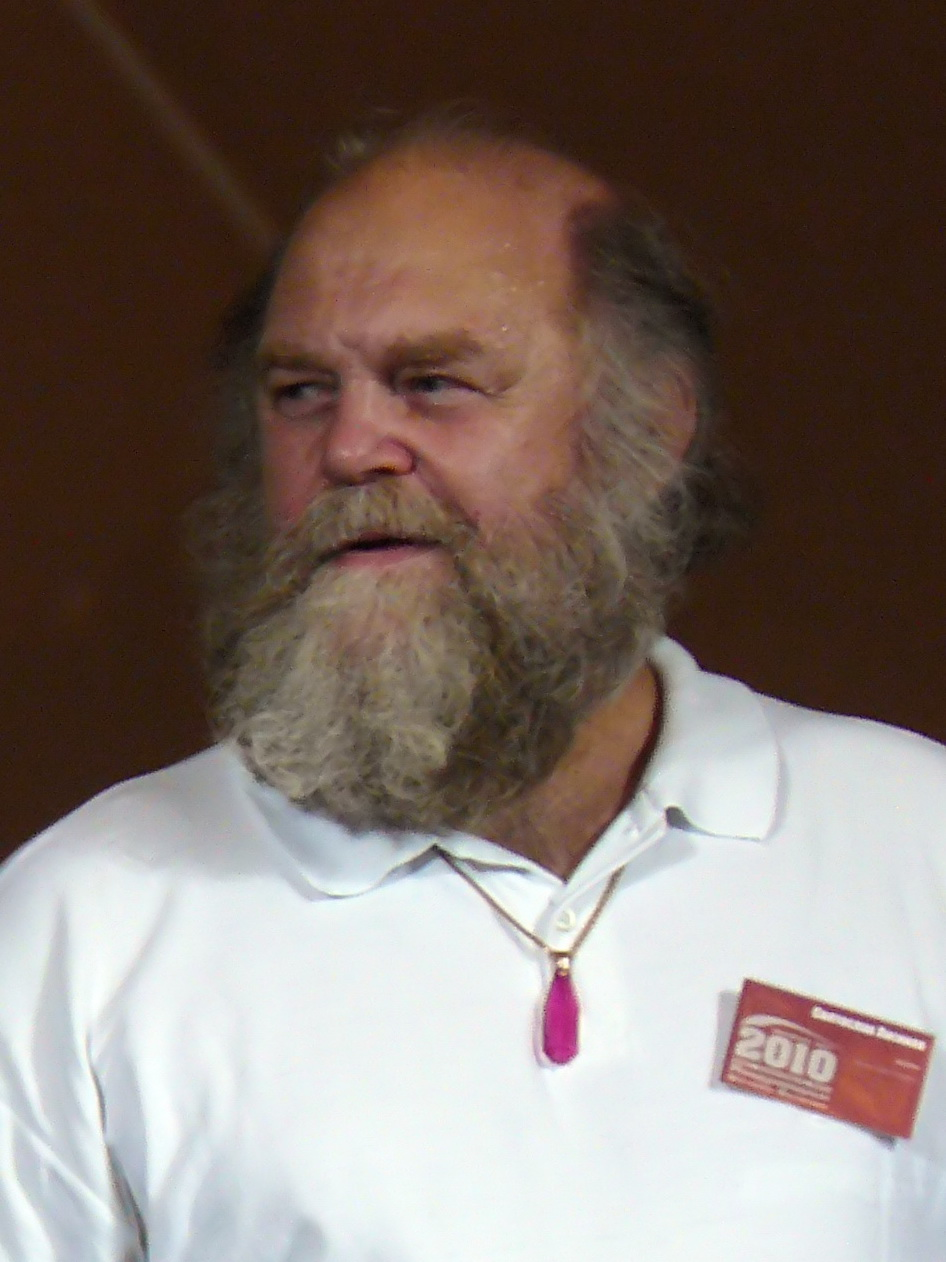
- Svyatoslav Loginov
- Born: October 9, 1951; Voroshilov, Primorsky Krai, Russian SFSR, Soviet Union
- Education: Faculty of Chemistry, Leningrad State University
- Occupation: Writer
- Writing career
- Pen name: Svyatoslav Loginov
- Years active: 1974–present
- Genres: Science fiction, fantasy
- Notable awards: Aelita Prize 2008
- Website: author.today/u/altayneolit1

Svyatoslav Vladimirovich Vitman, primarily known under the pen name Svyatoslav Loginov (Russian: Святослав Логинов, Святослав Владимирович Витман) (born October 9, 1951 in Ussuriysk, Russia (then Voroshilov, USSR)) is a Russian writer. He writes mostly science fiction and fantasy.

== Biography ==
Svyatoslav Vitman was born into a family of physicists in Ussuriysk, Russian Far East, then known as Voroshilov. In 1952, his family moved to Leningrad, where he still lives. His childhood was marked by a passion for science fiction literature, driving him to seek out both new releases and rare secondhand editions. During his school years, he showed a strong inclination towards writing, producing numerous essays. Besides literature, he was interested in chemistry, and even secured a prize at the All-Union Chemistry Olympiad for school students.

Svyatoslav Vitman graduated from a secondary vocational school specialized in chemistry and the Faculty of Chemistry at Leningrad State University.

His career encompassed diverse roles, including serving as a trainee at the Institute of Applied Chemistry and as a research associate at the Institute of Antibiotics and Enzymes for Medical Purposes. Additionally, he worked as a laborer before transitioning to the position of engineer at the "SchetMash" Design Bureau.

In April 1974, Svyatoslav Vitman began participating in the meetings of a newly established seminar for young science fiction writers, led by Boris Strugatsky.

One of the first his publication was in 1975, in Uralsky Sledopyt (Ural Pathfinder) magazine, under his birth name. According to Loginov's autobiography, he was hinted that in order to be published he has to use "a pen name ending in -ov", so he took his mother's maiden name, Loginov, and continued to use it even after it became possible to publish under his real name.

Since 1981, the works of Svyatoslav Loginov have been regularly published in various magazines and anthologies.

Between 1991 and 1992, Loginov wrote his first novel The Multi-Armed God of Dalain, published in 1995. The novel was based a board game with the same name created by Svyatoslav during his teenage years, as well as a Mongolian-Russian dictionary, which Loginov used to derive several proper names in the book. The novel earned Loginov the Belyaev Prize.

Loginov defines himself as a convinced atheist and attacks religion in many of his works.

== Bibliography ==
=== Novels ===
- 1995: The Multi-Armed God of Dalain
- 1996: Black Blood, with Nick Perumov
- Колодезь (Well, 1997)
- Земные пути (Terrestrial Ways, 1999)
- 1999: The Black Tornado
  The sequel to Black Blood
- Картёжник (The Gambler, 2000)
- 2002: A Light in the Window
- Имперские ведьмы (Imperial Witches, 2003)
- Атака извне (An Attack from the Outside, 2005)
  Completed drafts of the deceased Boris Zelensky
- Дорогой широкой (Along the Broad Road, 2005)
- 2007: Россия за облаком (Russia Behind the Cloud)
  Social speculative fiction set in modern Russia and involving time travel to the 19th century

== Awards ==
- InterPressCon Prize (1995, 1998, 1999, 2006)
  - 1995: for The Multi-Armed God of Dalain
- Aelita Prize (2008)
- Strannik (Russian Literary Award) (2003)
- Belyaev Prize (1995) for The Multi-Armed God of Dalain
