= Tony Vilgotsky =

Russian composer

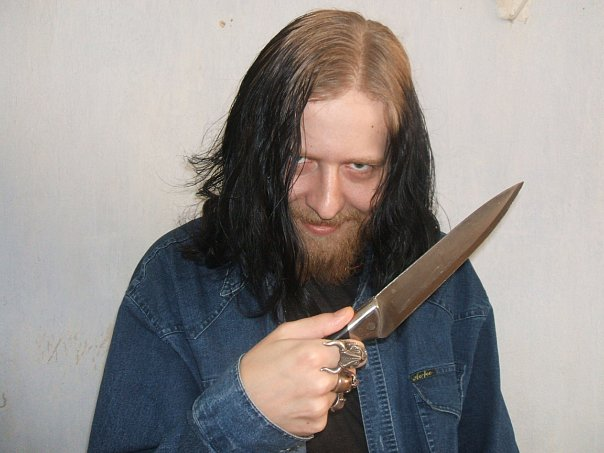
- Born: 14 June 1980 (age 46); Rostov-on-Don, Russian SFSR, Soviet Union
- Occupations: Author, journalist, game designer
- Writing career
- Genres: Horror, fantasy

Anton "Tony" Vilgotsky (Russian: Антон Вильгоцкий) is a Russian musician, composer, horror and fantasy writer, playwright, and musical columnist. He is mostly known for his fantasy and horror novels (Chosen by the Pentacle, Evil Never Sleeps, The Charmed Roads, Shepherd of the Dead and others) as well as his journalist work in such magazines like Dark City, Mir Fantastiki, OM, KVIR and Darker.

== Biography ==
Tony was born on June 14, 1980, in the Southern Russian city Rostov-on-Don. He spent some time studying journalism at a local university and then started to work as a correspondent in a local daily newspaper.

Since his adolescence, he admired the horror genre, which inspired him to begin writing horror stories himself. Two issues of his dark fantasy saga, The Chronicles of Skharn (Russian: Хроники Схарны), were published by Armada Publishing House in December 2008 and May 2009. The first of these novels landed on 7th position in Top 100 bestselling books of this publishing house of several years. Such success of debut novel was unexpected even for author himself. This book was nominated for prestigious Russian fiction award Roscon. The novel Evil Never Sleeps was nominated for one of the main awards of the fiction festival Star Bridge. Vilgotsky's next novel Little Shop of Horrors became one of the most anticipated Russian books of the following decade. His books were widely pirated and in 2010 somebody even hacked Vilgotsky's PC with intention to steal his new texts before their official release.

The novels Eye of Satan, Suburban Necromancer and The Charmed Roads were released in 2012 by company Litres which is a department of biggest Russian publishing house Eksmo.

During very long period Vilgotsky was the main author of Russian metal magazine Dark City. During this period he interviewed such bands like Amon Amarth, Das Ich, Crematory, Sopor Aeternus and the Ensemble of Shadows, Suicide Commando and many more. For some time he was a literary editor of Russian horror webzine The Darkness (Тьма) and continued to write for its successor, Darker magazine. Also, despite Vilgotsky is not a gay himself, his articles about different gay musicians often can be noticed in Russian LGBT-magazine Kvir. Also he works as translator and music observer in Russian version of Classic Rock magazine.

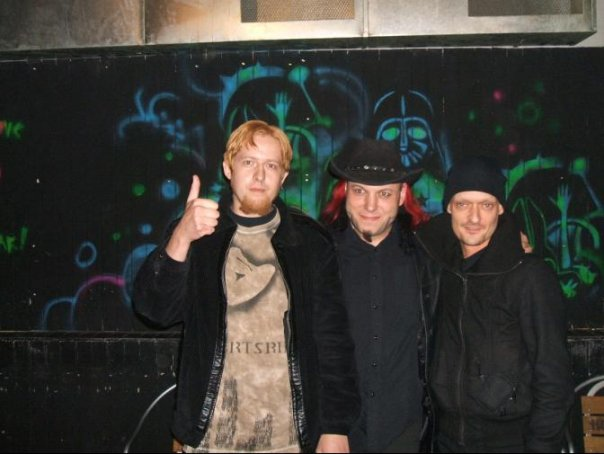
Tony Vilgotsky with the members of German Gothic band Das Ich

He was the first Russian journalist who interviewed American musician and actor Ari Lehman (the first portrayer of Jason Voorhees in the first "Friday the 13th" movie), and famous movie composer Harry Manfredini who scored most of the "Friday" movies. The latter interview was published in Mir Fantastiki Later Vilgotsky interviewed many horror celebrities, including Tom Savini, Felissa Rose, Scott Derrickson, Brian Paulin, Matt Farnsworth, Dieter Laser, Victor Brooke Miller and more.

Since 2012, Vilgotsky began to collaborate with Hollywood horror magazine Gore Noir. Also he was noticed among authors of Australian horror magazine Midnight Echo.

Vilgotsky is also the first Russian author who created a full biography of Ayn Rand. This book was highly praised by the critics and became a national bestseller in Russia and Ukraine. All copies of the book were sold out during the first month after its release. The novel Shepherd of the Dead was listed among best new fiction books of the year just a week after its release. Talking on this book the critics compared Vilgotsky's style to that of Clive Barker. The novel also became a bestseller in Estonia, where all the copies of the book were sold out during one night after their delivery from Russia. By the end of the year 2018 novel Shepherd of the Dead became a national bestseller in Russia too. In biggest Russian online book store, Ozon, the book was completely sold out during few months since its release. This book also went to become a bestseller in [[Armenia|Armenia]]. Vilgotsky's novel Warriors of the Church was cited in the list of foreign books recommended to Americans who are interested in non-American horror literature.

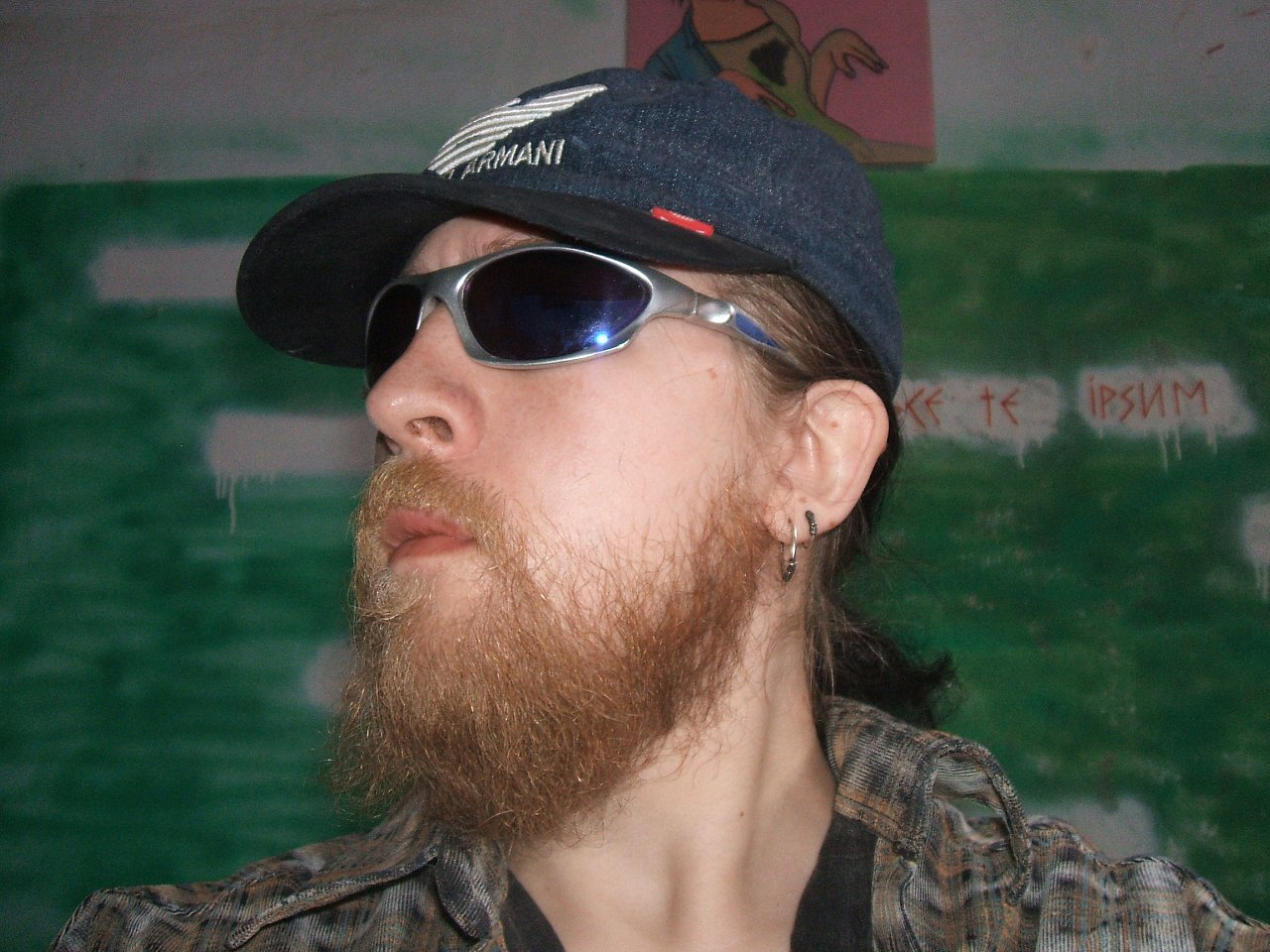
Tony Vilgotsky during the press conference in underground club of Rostov-on-Don, 2010

== Illustrations ==
In 2017 Tony released a new non-fiction book Self-Defence by Materials at Hand with illustrations drawn by himself. This book is intended mostly for a female audience.

== Music ==
In the years 2009–2014 Tony Vilgotsky was active on dark electro scene as a leader of horror electro project Soul Cancer. They released several web albums and then disbanded. In one of the tracks the group collaborated with iconic B-movie actor Dieter Laser. After the end of Soul Cancer's career Tony as musician and composer focused primarily on film and game soundtrack work.

In July 2025 Vilgotsky released his first complete album "Entering Universe" on streaming services via the Russian label YourTunes.

== Video game career ==
In recent years Tony has quit journalism as his day job, with a goal to focus on his literature works and also to try himself in a world of business. For a year he worked as brand manager and press secretary in one of the largest Russian modeling agencies, Image-Elite, than migrated into video game industry. As it's known, he was a member of at least two game development teams – Aurum Dust and Redox Entertainment, which produced, respectively, such games as Ash of Gods: Redemption (Tactical RPG) and Cows VS Vikings (tower defense). Also he provided music soundtracks for several indie games. In December 2016, Vilgotsky announced that he wants to try himself as game designer and that he started to develop his first video game. Details of this project weren't revealed yet. Due to Vilgotsky's popularity over Post-Soviet space, the news about his first game project were widely spread by many sources of the region. Later was announced that Vilgotsky is planning to release another game before the one that was announced earlier. The name of the game is "Воины Церкви: отстрел нечисти" (Evil Spirit Shootdown) and it is based on his own novel Warriors of the Church.

== Personal life ==
As Tony admitted in one of his interviews, he is an enthusiastic gamer who began to play videogames from early childhood. Among his favorite games he lists such titles as Witcher, Neverwinter Nights 1 and 2, Hellgate: London and Assassin's Creed. He's a fan of ambient and world music (because, as he admits, he was tired of extreme metal during his metal observer career).

He is also a fan of Twin Peaks and other movies by David Lynch.

== Bibliography ==
Novels

- Chosen by the Pentacle (fantasy novel) – 2008 (Armada publishing house, Moscow)
- Evil Never Sleeps (fantasy novel) – 2009 (Armada publishing house, Moscow)
- The Charmed Roads (fantasy novel) – 2012 (LitRes, Moscow)
- Suburban Necromacer (dark fantasy and horror novel) – 2012 (LitRes, Moscow)
- Eye of Satan aka Warriors of the Church (action fiction and horror novel) – 2012 (LitRes, Moscow)
- Little Shop of Horrors (book of horror stories) – 2012 (LitRes, Moscow)
- Shepherd of the Dead (dark fantasy and horror novel) – 2018 (Eksmo, Moscow)
- Day Z (zombie horror action novel) – 2022 (Author Today, Moscow)
- The Ripper of Petrograd (detective fiction) – TBA

Short stories

- The Entomologists – 2003 (Donskaya Kultura, Rostov-on-Don)
- Trevor – 2013 (Bloody-Mess.net, UK)

Non-fiction

- Who is Ayn Rand? – 2015 (AST, Moscow)
- Self-defence by materials at hand – 2016 (Krylov, St. Petersburg)

Scientific researches

- Russian Fields of Mysteries – 2013 (Midnight Echo, Australia)

== Filmography ==
Year	Film	Role
2013	Cryptic Plasm (directed by Brian Paulin)	Composer
2017	Vitals (directed by Marc Morgenstern)	Composer
2018	Septic (directed by Brian Paulin)	Composer
TBA	Abysmal Purgatory (directed by Brian Paulin)	Composer
TBA	Stalin's Bunker	Composer, producer, actor

== Video game music and sound design ==
- Varnid (2010)
- Evil Spirits Shutdown (2017)
- Scary Forest (2018)
- Broadcast Project (2019)
- Space Arcade (2020)
- Radiostalker (2020)
- Pirates: Golden Tits (2020)
- Voiders (2021)
- Ilias (2021)
- Eggs in Corn (2021)
- Redemption (2021)
- Galaxy Runner (2021)
- Veliri (2021)
- Business Angels (2021)
- Kingdom's Life (2021)
- Edge of the World (2021)
- Forbidden Fruit (2021)
- Frequency: Chernobyl (2022)
- Ratten Reich (2022)
- W.I.N.T.E.R. (2022)
- Rustlords (2023)
- SeeYa (2023)
- Fight for Power (2023)
- Risk of Pain (2023)
- Intown Nightmares (2023)
- Gamer's Reward (2024)
- Sabrina Spy (2024)
- Office Party (2024)
- Dominator Survival (2024)
- Age of Gunfighters (TBA)
- Deadwest (TBA)
