= Joaquim Crima =

Russian politician

Joachim Ritu Cabi Crima (Russian: Жоаким Крима) or Vassily Ivanovich Crima (Russian: Василий Иванович Крима), a Guinea-Bissauan-born farmer living in Russia. He is a former independent candidate in the 2009 Srednyaya Akhtuba election. As the first black man to run for head of the district, Crima received the nickname "the Russian Obama". However, both he and another black candidate for the post, Filipp Kondratyev came in third (with 4.75%) and last against the United Russia incumbent.

Crima resigned from the United Russia party in 2011.

Joaquim Crima settled in southern Russia in 1989 after earning a degree from Volgograd State Pedagogical University. He and his wife, Anait, who is of Armenian descent, have a 10-year-old son. In addition to farming, he also sells melons at the local marketplace in the district.
