= Mikhail Sannikov =

Tingdzin Dokshit

Personal life
- Born: Mikhail Sannikov; 30 November 1961 (age 64) Votkinsk, Udmurt ASSR, USSR
- Children: three sons, one daughter
- Occupation: abbot

Religious life
- Religion: Buddhism
- Dharma name: Standard Tibetan: ཏིང་འཟིན་དྲག་གཤེད།

Senior posting
- Teacher: Darma Dodi Jalsarayev
- Based in: Shadchupling, Sverdlovsk oblast, Russia

Mikhail Sannikov (Russian: Михаил Васильевич Санников; born 30 November 1961) is a Russian cleric, abbot of Shadchupling in Sverdlovsk oblast, Russian Federation.

== Sources ==
- Пореш В. Тибетский буддизм в России // "Современная религиозная жизнь России", Т.3 / Отв. ред. М. Бурдо, С.Б. Филатов. - М., "Логос", 2005, ISBN 5-98704-044-2

=== Russian media sources ===
- Архипов А. Монах // «Argumenty i Fakty – Урал», No.39, 2003
- Бессарабова А. Наш корреспондент попробовал стать буддийским монахом // «Мир новостей», 20.12.2005
- Жуковская А. Судьба разведчика по-уральски. Резидент стал буддийским монахом // «Argumenty i Fakty – Урал», No.34, 2006
- Самоделова С. Земля Санникова // «Moskovsky Komsomolets», 12.01.2006
- Хазов А., Суворова Т. Уральский буддизм. //«Uralsky Sledopyt», No.7, 2002
- Шорин А. Буддийский монастырь под угрозой сноса // «Областная газета», 14.09.2006.
