= Viktor Kolupaev =

Viktor Dmitrievič Kolupaev (September 19, 1936 – June 4, 2001) was a Russian scientist and soft science fiction author who won the Aelita Prize in 1986 and 1988. Kolupaev was born in Nezametny, Yakutia, attended school in Krasnoyarsk and moved in 1954 to Tomsk where he attended the Tomsk Polytechnic Institute and became a member of the Siberian Physical-Technical Institute of the Tomsk State University, where he worked in mathematics and bionics. He started writing fiction in 1970.

== Works ==
- Билет в детство (A Ticket to Childhood) (1969)
- Волевое усилие (Mindpower) (1970)
- Газетный киоск (The Newsstand) (1971)
- Вдохновение (Inspiration) (1971)
- Настройщик роялей (The Piano-Tuner) (1972)
- Качели Отшельника (Hermit's Swing) (1972)
- Весна света (World's Spring) (1972)
- Самый большой дом (The Biggest House) (1974)
- Какие смешные деревья (Strange Trees) (1975)
- Любовь к Земле (For Love of Earth) (1975)
- Улыбка (Smile) (1975)
- Az író gép (1980)

Kolupaev also published two collections: Hermit's Swing (1980) and The Singing Forest (1984). His only novel was Firmenny Poezd "Fomitch" ("The 'Fomitch' Special Train"), published in 1979.
