= Polygon (film) =

Polygon – The Firing Range
- The mind-reading tank from the film
- Directed by: Anatoly Petrov
- Written by: Sever Gansovsky; Arcady Snessarev
- Produced by: Lyubov Butyrina
- Starring: Vsevolod Yakut; Oleg Mokshantsev; Aleksandr Belyavsky; Anatoly Kuznetsov; Sergei Martynov
- Cinematography: Vladimir Zarubin; Anatoly Petrov; Michael Druyan
- Edited by: Lyubov Georgieva
- Music by: Vladimir Kutuzov
- Production company: Soyuzmultfilm
- Release date: 25 May 1977
- Running time: 10:14 minutes
- Country: USSR
- Language: Russian

Polygon or Proving ground (Russian: Полигон) is a 1977 Soviet animation science fiction short film.

== Plot summary ==
The plot is based on an anti-war military science fiction story by Sever Gansovsky.

In the not-too-distant future a professor from a military great power wants revenge for his son (who was a paratrooper KIA during a war) and thus invents a weapon capable of ending the conflict – an automated mind-reading tank that detects and reacts to human feelings of hostility and fear. After his revenge successfully takes place (as the tank destroys a number of generals responsible for the loss of his son) he himself falls victim to his own creation.

The film has an open ending.

== Voice cast ==
- Vsevolod Yakut
- Oleg Mokshantsev
- Aleksandr Belyavsky
- Anatoly Kuznetsov
- Sergei Martynov

== Production information ==
Polygon was directed by Anatoly Petrov (born 1937) and it was based on a screenplay by Sever Gansovsky (edited by Arcady Snessarev). The short film was produced by Lubov' Butyrina and released by Soyuzmultfilm studio. It featured the artwork of artists Elena Karavaeva, Olga Bogolubova, I. Kulakova, Elena Bogolubova and N. Ivancheva. The art director was Galina Barinova.

The animator was Vladimir Zarubin under the supervision of Anatoly Petrov. It was filmed by cameraman Michael Druyan and the sound effects and music were created by Vladimir Kutuzov.

== Animation technique ==
The film was drawn in an unusual animation technique called photographica that consists of two celluloid layers for each character with special color schemes and with one of the layers out of focus to imitate the three-dimensional space rendering. The animation then actively moves the virtual camera to change perspective dynamically for each scene and give a sense of realism, without the use of any CGI methods (which were not available at the time).

The characters in this animated film were designed with faces very similar to those of several famous movie actors and celebrities of the time, including Ringo Starr, Jean Gabin, Paul Newman, Yul Brynner and Mel Ferrer (The professor) among others.

== Music ==
The French orchestra leader Paul Mauriat provided the theme music for the film which is an instrumental arrangement version of the "El Bimbo" originally made by the French euro disco group Bimbo Jet led by Claude Morgan and Laurent Rossi.

== Awards ==
The film won the following awards:

- First Prize at the Yerevan Film Festival (USSR, 1978).
- Official Selection at the Oberhausen Film Festival (Germany, 1979).

== Literature ==
- Sergey Kapkov. Encyclopedia of Russian Animation. Moscow: Algorithm Publishing House, 2006. pp. 509–510. 816 p. 3,000 copies. ISBN 5-9265-0319-4.
