= Sever Gansovsky =

Soviet writer

Sever Feliksovich Gansovsky (Russian: Се́вер Фе́ликсович Гансо́вский; 15 December 1918 – 6 September 1990) was a Soviet science fiction author. He mostly wrote short stories.

== Biography ==
Sever Gansovsky was born in the family of Ella-Johanna May, a singer from Latvia. During one of the tours in Poland she met Felix Gansovsky and married him. In 1918 they had two children, Sever and Veronika. Felix disappeared soon after their birth, and Ella moved to Leningrad. During Stalinist repressions in the 1930s she was arrested and shot in prison.

Sever Gansovsky worked as a cabin boy and sailor in Murmansk, and later as an electrician in Leningrad. He graduated from the evening school. In 1940 he entered the Leningrad State University, but in 1941 volunteered to join the army for the Great Patriotic War. He served as a marine sniper and the scout. Gansovsky was seriously wounded in 1942, but survived, although his relatives were initially told that he had been killed in action and buried. After demobilization he worked as a postman, teacher, and had some other jobs. He graduated from the Leningrad State University in 1951 (Faculty of Philology). In 1954 he married Evgenia Sergeyeva, in 1955 they had a daughter called Ilona.

He started publishing his written works in magazines in 1950, while studying at the university. In 1959 he was awarded the First Prize at the USSR All-Union Competition for the short play To the Northwest of Berlin (Russian: Северо-западнее Берлина) and the Second Prize for another play People in This Hour (Russian: Люди этого часа). In the 1960s he switched to science fiction. His first published work in that genre was The Guest from the Stone Age (Russian: Гость из каменного века; 1960). Algis Budrys compared his "A Day of Wrath" to the works of John W. Campbell. In 1989 he won the Aelita Prize for his collection of short stories Instinct? (Russian: Инстинкт?). Several of his works were adapted into films. Gansovsky was also famous for his illustrations, particularly to the first edition of Boris and Arkady Strugatsky's novel Snail on the Slope. His daughter Ilona became a painter and illustrator. She died in a car crash on December 23, 2008.

== Works ==
=== Short fiction ===
"Vincent Van Gogh", published in Aliens, Travelers and Other Strangers: New Science Fiction from the Soviet Union, edited by Boris and Arkady Strugatsky.

=== Collections ===
The Day of Wrath.

=== Film ===
Polygon (AKA The Firing Range).
