= Darker (magazine) =

Russian horror webzine

DARKER
- #7, July, 2020 Theme of the issue: Confined spaces. If you don't have claustrophobia, it doesn't mean that you have nothing to fear here.
- Categories: horror fiction, popular culture
- Frequency: 12 per year
- Publisher: Mikhail Parfyonov
- First issue: April 21, 2011; 14 years ago
- Country: Russia
- Website: darkermagazine.ru
- ISSN: 2222-9116

Darker is a Russian monthly horror webzine. It covers various sorts of horror media, including slasher, splatter, exploitation films, as well as horror literature, videogames, comic books and dark music. The magazine is in regular publication since April, 2011. It publishes articles, interviews, reviews and short stories by Russian and foreign authors. The zine also helds an annual literary contest "The Devil's Dozen", which is the largest among horror stories in Russian. Darker Magazine is a cult outlet in Russian Internet horror segment, and its mission is support of horror in Russia. It is published on the initiative and with the assistance of The Horror Authors Association and Horror Web media network. The zine is funded by its subscribers.

== History ==
Darker was founded in 2011 succeeding another webzine The Darkness (Russian: Тьма). Darkness' editor Mikhail Parfyonov ran the new project that soon became even more successful than its predecessor. The first issue of Darker was released on April 21, 2011 and since then has been published every month on 20th. Darker also prints reviews of books and movies and interviews with notable creators in the horror genre.

== Notable authors ==
Darker has been first in Russia to translate some short stories by such horror authors as H.P. Lovecraft, Clive Barker, Tomas Ligotti, Jeff Vandermeer, Graham Masterton, Christopher Golden, Joe Lansdale, Ramsey Campbell, Robert McCammon, Adam Nevill, Ken Liu, Gwendolyn Kiste, Matthew Stokoe S.T. Joshi and more. Also publish for the first time some short stories of the famous Russian writers as Mariya Galina, Svyatoslav Loginov, Anna Starobinets. The zine also publishes interviews with notable horror figures.

== Critics ==
An opinion of British author Graham Masterton about Darker:

[…] to make horror popular and to bring together a community of people who find horror exciting, frightening, wildly imaginative and highly creative. DARKER does the same for Russia. There is a wonderful tradition of dark and disturbing literature in Russia. […] DARKER is helping to breathe life back into that tradition and I admire your courage and determination in doing that.

== Notable contributors ==
- Mikhail Parfyonov — creator of the webzine
- Svyatoslav Loginov — veteran of Russian science fiction
- Maria Galina — Russian horror writer and translator

== Awards ==
| Award | Year | Category | Outcome |
|---|---|---|---|
| Eurocon | 2013 | Spirit of Dedication Award. Best Fanzine | Nominated |
| Eurocon | 2014 | Spirit of Dedication Award. Best Fanzine | Won |
| Masters of Horror | 2018 | Best periodical/fanzine | Won |
| Masters of Horror | 2020 | Best project | Won |
