= Aelita Prize =

Russian award for science fiction writers

The Aelita Award is an award for science fiction writers founded by the Union of Writers of Russia (formerly the Union of RSFSR Writers) and "Uralsky Sledopyt Magazine" in 1981. It was named after the classic Russian science fiction novel Aelita. The prize is awarded during the Aelita, a Soviet/Russian science fiction fandom convention.

In 1989, the Start Award was created as a runner-up award to the Aelita.

A number of other awards are or have been given in conjunction with the Aëlita ceremony. These include:

The Ivan Yefremov Memorial Award, named in honor of science fiction writer and paleontologist Ivan Yefremov (1908–1972) and recognizes great contributions to the development of Soviet science fiction studies.

The Vitaly Bugrov Memorial Award is given in honor of science fiction writer, editor and critic Vitaly Bugrov (1938–1994) for great contributions to the writing of story collections and nonfiction works. He was also instrumental in the founding of the Aëlita Award.

The Order of the Knights of Science Fiction & Fantasy is given for great contributions to Russian fandom.

The Europe-Asia Award is given for writers who reflect or represent Ekaterinburg and the Urals in their writing.

The Order of Kindness & Light is given for writers who promote in their works ideas of humaneness, kindness and a positive attitude towards humanity. The Master of Science Fiction & Fantasy Award is like the Grand Master Award given by the Science Fiction Writers of America (SFWA).

The Velikoye Koltso (Great Ring) Award was established by Boris Zavgorodny and was re-established by the Alkor Fan Club. It is given by Soviet fandom for their favorite novel, and physically resembles the American Hugo Award.

== Aelita Award winners ==
- 1981 – (tie) Arkady and Boris Strugatsky, Alexander Kazantsev
- 1982 – Zinovi Yuriev
- 1983 – Vladislav Krapivin
- 1984 – Sergej Snegow
- 1985 – Sergey Pavlov
- 1986 – Viktor Kolupaev
- 1987 – Olga Larionova
- 1988 – Viktor Kolupaev
- 1989 – Sever Gansovsky
- 1990 – Oleg Korabelnikov
- 1991 – Vladimir Mikhailov
- 1992 – Sergei Drugal
- 1993 – Vasily Zvyagintsev
- 1994 – Gennadiy Prashkevich
- 1995 – No award given.
- 1997 – Kir Bulychov
- 1998 – Eugeniy Gulyakovskiy
- 1999 – Sergey Lukyanenko
- 2000 – Vadim Shefner
- 2001 – Marina and Sergey Dyachenko
- 2002 – Evgeny Lukin
- 2003 – Vladimir Savchenko
- 2004 – Vasili Golovachov
- 2006 – Alexander Gromov
- 2007 – No award given.
- 2008 – Svyatoslav Loginov
- 2009 – Vladimir Vasilyev
- 2010 – Andrey Lazarchuk
- 2011 – H. L. Oldie
- 2012 – Pavel Amnuel
- 2013 – Roman Zlotnikov
- 2014 – Isay Davydov for I Will Return in a Thousand Years
- 2015 – Vyacheslav Rybakov
- 2016 – Evgeny Filenko
- 2017 – Andrei Belyanin
- 2018 – Vadim Panov
- 2019 – Oleg Divov
- 2020 – Michael Swanwick
- 2021 – Alan Dean Foster
- 2022 – Sergei Abramov

== Start Award winners ==
- 1989 – Boris Shtern
- 1990 – Andrei Stolyarov
- 1991 – Vyacheslav Rybakov
- 1992 – Alexander Tyurin & Alexander Shchiogolev
- 1993 – Sergei Lukyanenko
- 1994 – Andrei Shcherbak-Zhukov
- 1995 – No award given.
- 1996 – No award given.
- 1997 – Andrei Valentinov
- 1998 – Mikhail Tyrin
- 1999 – Andrey Plekhanov
- 2000 – Natalya R'azanova
- 2001 – Victor Burtsev
- 2002 – Leonid Kaganov
- 2003 – Vitaly Kaplan
- 2004 – Alexei Ivanov
- 2005 – Lora Andronova
- 2006 – Irina Olovyannaya
- 2007 – No award given.
- 2008 – Sergey Paliy
- 2009 – No award given.
- 2010 – Ilya Te
- 2011 – Vitaliy Aboyan
- 2012 – No award given.
- 2013 – Alexei Vert
- 2014 – No award given.
- 2015 – Nikita Averin
- 2016 – No award given.
- 2017 – Nataliya Yankovich
- 2018 – Nikolay Chepurin
- 2019 – Igor Samoilov
- 2020 – Leon Smith
- 2021 – Max Maksimov
- 2022 – Petr Novichkov

Award discontinued?

== Ivan Yefremov Memorial Award winners ==
- 1987 – Georgi Gurevich
- 1988 – (tie) Dmitri Bilenkin & Vitaly Bugrov
- 1989 – Georgii Grechko
- 1990 – Viktor Babenko
- 1991 – Igor Khalymbahdza
- 1992 – Andrei Balabukha
- 1993 –
- 1994 –
- 1995 –
- 1996 –
- 1997 – Evgeniya Sterligova
- 1998 – Alexander Kashirin
- 1999 – Alexander Sidorovich
- 2000 – Nina Berkova
- 2001 – Vladimir Borisov
- 2002 – Bella Kl'ueva
- 2003 – Dmitriy Vatolin
- 2004 –
- 2005 –
- 2006 –
- 2007 –
- 2008 –
- 2009 –
- 2010 –
- 2011 –
- 2012 – Andrey Sinitsin

Award discontinued?

== Vitaly Bugrov Memorial Award winners ==
- 1997 – Vladimir Gakov
- 1998 – Sergei Kazantsev
- 1999 – Yevgeny Kharitonov
- 2000 – Vladimir Gopman
- 2001 – Alexander Royfe
- 2002 – Dmitriy Baykalov
- 2003 – Eugeny Permyakov
- 2004 –
- 2005 –
- 2006 –
- 2007 –
- 2008 –
- 2009 –
- 2010 –
- 2011 –
- 2012 – Sergei Chekmaev

Award discontinued?
