= Vasily Zvyagintsev =

Russian science fiction author (1944–2016)

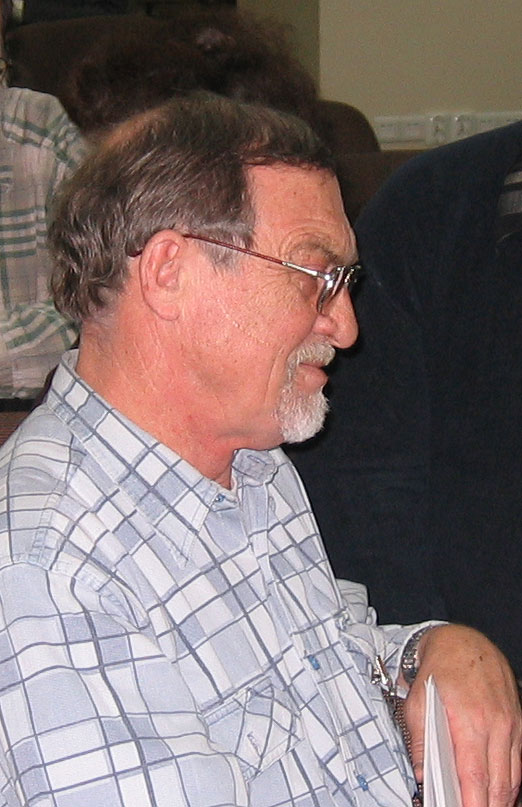
- Born: Василий Дмитриевич Звягинцев; Vasily Dmitrievich Zvyagintsev; 21 November 1944; Grozny, USSR
- Died: 30 April 2016 (aged 71); Stavropol, Russia
- Education: Stavropol medical college
- Occupation: writer

Vasily Dmitrievich Zvyagintsev (Russian: Василий Дмитриевич Звягинцев; 21 November 1944 – 30 April 2016) was a Russian science fiction author.

== Biography ==
Zvyagintsev was born in Grozny on 21 November 1944, graduated from Stavropol medical college, worked as emergency assistance doctor, and served as military doctor on Sakhalin island. After returning to Stavropol, he spent 10 years working in Komsomol youth organization and in trade unions, served in political division of Russian Ministry of Internal Affairs. He first published in 1987: Weekend on a river bank. He lived in Stavropol.

Considered by many Russian fans to be one of the best science fiction authors, he wrote his only novel series Odysseus leaves Ithaca, set during World War II. The series was also acclaimed by professional literary critics. It contains more than 10 volumes, with each one connected to the others in some way yet can be read separately.

For the epic Odysseus leaves Ithaca, in 1993 Zvyagintsev received four prestigious literary awards: the Aelita Prize, Interpesscon, А. R. Belyaev award and special international award Eurocon.

Zvyagintsev was a member of the board of Strannik Literary Award. Vasiliy. He also took part in 'Volgacon-91' and 'Strannik-2002'.

Zvyagintsev died on 30 April 2016, aged 71.

== Bibliography ==
=== Series ===
Odysseus leaves Ithaca

1. Odysseus leaves Ithaca (1983) [= Gambit of the Dame of Diamonds (1978) + Odysseus leaves Ithaca (1983)]
2. Bull dogs under the carpet (1993)
3. Active engagement for purposes of intelligence gathering (1996)
4. Whirl of Valhalla (1997)
5. Brotherhood of St. Andrew (1997) [= Right to death]
6. Local engagements (1999)
7. Play time (2000)
8. Hole for the medal of honor (2001) [start of the subseries]
9. Ticket for Charon's boat (2003)
10. Burden of the living (2004)
11. Farther than the front line (2005)
12. Clapping with one hand (2006)
13. Scorpion in amber (2007)

=== Novellas and stories ===
- Weekend on a river bank (1987)
- If one wants one can (1987)
