= Nothing But Ice =

Short story by Dmitri Bilenkin

Nothing but ice ("Nothing except ice", "Nichego, krome l'da" Russian: Ничего́, кро́ме льда́) is a short science fiction story, written by Dmitri Bilenkin. It is also the name of a stories collection by Bilenkin.

== Characters and Events ==
Story discusses emotional experience of the starship crew members, who faced an interesting dilemma - to blow up the distant star in an immense scientific experiment with the consequences of destroying the planet which looks like a masterpiece of Nature or to leave the star system empty-handed losing the great opportunity of giving the Earth a key to the Universe. The story has an open end, i.e. no resolution of this dilemma is given.
