= Bimbo Jet =

French euro disco group

Bimbo Jet was a French euro disco group led by Claude Morgan (born November 1, 1947) and Laurent Rossi (22 May 1948 – 20 August 2015), that gained international fame during the summers of 1974 and 1975 with the song "El Bimbo" (Italian for "Baby", see Bimbo). The group had another hit in mid-1975, particularly in France, with "La Balanga."

Laurent Rossi died of a heart attack on 20 August 2015, at age 67. He was the son of singer Tino Rossi.

== El bimbo in charts ==
"El Bimbo" was released in France in June 1974 on the Pathé-Marconi record label, and in the UK in August 1975. The track went to #1 in France and #12 in the UK Singles Chart. It sold 1.3 million copies in France alone, and throughout the world over three million discs. As well as in France, the tune topped charts in Spain, Italy, Denmark, Turkey. and Lebanon. In Argentina, it was No. 2, and was a chart hit in Belgium, Switzerland, Mexico, and the United States. The record reached No. 1 in the Billboard Disco Singles, #5 on the Disco File Top 20 chart, and #43 in the Hot 100 charts in the U.S. In Canada, the song reached No. 77 in the Top Singles chart, and #31 in the Pop Music Playlist.

== Cover versions ==
- Paul Mauriat released an instrumental arrangement in 1975.
- An instrumental cover version was recorded by Mescherin's Orchestra in the 1970s. This version was often used on Soviet TV as an interlude and was released in compilation album easyUSSR (Лёгкие, LG-006-4).
- Greek singer Yiannis Parios had a hit cover version, in the Greek language "Pote Den Se Xehno" in the mid-1970s.
- The singer Marion released a single (Decca Records, 6.11 574 (AC)) with lyrics by Gerd Thumser, published in Germany in 1974, the album titled El bimbo in 1975 was published in Finland (EMI Records, 5E 246-35080), which had the song "El bimbo" as its opening track, with lyrics translated by Pertti Reponen. The album was the best-selling album in Finland for five weeks. It has sold over 52 000 copies, reaching platinum status. El bimbo is Marion's best-selling album throughout her career.
- Japanese singer Akemi Ishii covered this song as "An Olive Necklace" (オリーブの首飾り, Orību no Kubikazari) in November 1989.
- Indian Singer Zubeen Garg released a cover version in the Assamese language song "I Love you Buli Kolu Moi" in 2004.
- Ahmad Zahir, a famous musician in the 1960s and 1970s from Afghanistan, sampled El Bimbo when creating the Afghan hit "Tanha Shudam Tanha."

== Use of El Bimbo in other media ==
The song, in a tango arrangement by Jean-Marc Dompierre, appeared in four of the seven Police Academy films starting from the first film up until Police Academy 4: Citizens on Patrol as the tango song in the Blue Oyster Bar scenes.

The song "El Bimbo" (Paul Mauriat's version) is used as a theme song for a 1977 Soviet-made anti-war short film named "Polygon" directed by Anatoly Petrov and written by Sever Gansovsky.

The lyrics for "El Bimbo" were written by Hal Shaper.
