= Dmitry Lachinov =

Russian physicist (1842–1902)

- Дмитрий Лачинов
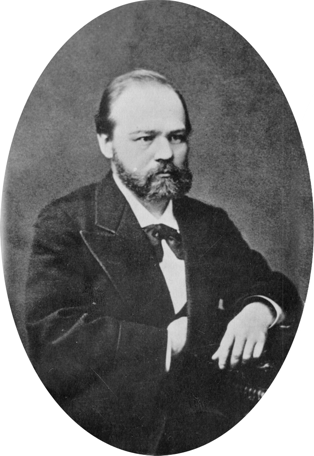
- Lachinov in 1870
- Born: May 10, 1842
- Died: October 15, 1902 (aged 60)
- Occupations: Physicist; electrical engineer; inventor; meteorologist; climatologist
- Relatives: Mikhail Shultz (great-grandson)

Dmitry Aleksandrovich Lachinov (Russian: Дмитрий Александрович Лачи́нов; 10 May 1842 – 15 October 1902) was a Russian physicist, electrical engineer, inventor, meteorologist and climatologist.

== Biography ==
Lachinov studied in the St. Petersburg University, where he was a pupil of Heinrich Lenz, Pafnuty Chebyshev, and Feodor Petrushevsky. In 1862, when the university was closed because of the students' unrest, Lachinov went to Germany and for two and a half years studied there under the guidance of Gustav Kirchhoff, Robert Bunsen and Hermann Helmholtz, attending practical lessons in their laboratories in Heidelberg and Tübingen.

In a paper released in 1880, Lachinov became the first one to point out the possibility of electricity transmission over long distances, and to propose the means of achieving it, 18 months before the first publication of the article with similar conclusions by Marcel Deprez.

In 1889 Lachinov wrote the first textbook on meteorology and climatology in Russia. In its 2nd edition (July 1895), he gave the first description of the lightning detector invented earlier by Alexander Popov (the device was also a prototype of the first practical radio receiver).

Lachinov's own inventions include a mercury pump, economizer for electricity consumption, electrical insulation tester (or defectoscope), optical dynamometer, a special type of photometer and electrolyser. One of his main achievements was a method of industrial synthesis of hydrogen and oxygen through electrolysis (1888).

Lachinov is the great-grandfather of physical chemist Mikhail Schultz. He was an Officer of the Order of the Légion d'honneur.

A page from the Lachinov's paper Electromechanic work, shows the details of electrical insulation defectoscope.

== See also ==
- List of Russian inventors

== Sources ==
- Lachinov Dmitry Aleksandrovich at Great Cyrill and Methodius Encyclopedia (in Russian)
- Rzhosnitsky B. N. Dmitry Aleksandrovich Lachinov. Moscow-Leningrad: Gosenergoizdat, 1955 / Ржонсницкий Б. Н. Дмитрий Александрович Лачинов. — М.—Л.: Госэнергоиздат, 1955 (in Russian)
