= Mikhail Tyrin =

Russian science fiction writer (born 1970)

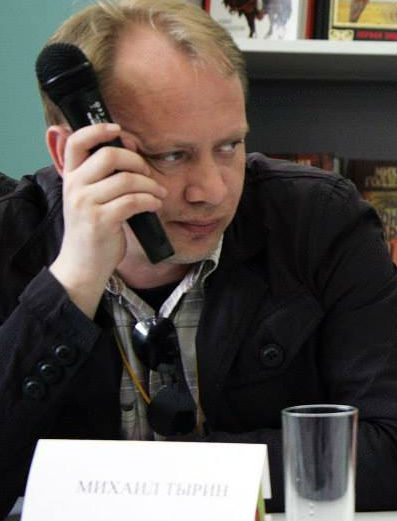
- Mikhail Tyrin, 2015
- Born: October 25, 1970 (age 55); Meshchovsk, Kaluga Oblast, RSFSR USSR
- Occupations: Writer, Journalist, Blogger
- Writing career
- Genres: Science fiction, Fantasy

Mikhail Yuryevich Tyrin (Russian: Михаил Юрьевич Тырин; born October 23, 1970, in Meshchovsk, Kaluga Oblast) is a Russian science fiction writer.

== Biography ==
Year studied at Bauman Moscow State Technical University, and then graduated from the philological faculty of Kaluga State University.

He worked as a journalist, served in the field of internal affairs for a few years, as an employee of the press center of Kaluga Department of Internal Affairs, a member of the press center of the federal command in Chechnya (1995). He retired with the rank of captain of the militia.

His first story in 1996, Small Opportunities. In the same year published the first book of The Shadow of the Patron Saint, awarded the Festival Aelita Prize (Start Award).

== Personal life ==
Married, two children.

== Bibliography ==
=== Novels ===
- Phantom Pain (1998)
- Children Rust (1999)
- The Invincible Creature (2001)
- Syndicate Thunder (2002)
- Yellow Line (2003)
- The Reflected Threat (2005)
- Smuggler (2008)
- Cemetery of Gods (2009)
- Legions of Chaos (2011)
- Samovolka (together with Sergei Lukyanenko) (2014)

=== Story ===
- Sins of the Night Sky (1996)
- End the Mystery of the Fall (1996)
- Graven Image (1998)
- Conspiracy of the Doomed (2001)
- Release the Beast (2001)
- Pustozemskie Kamni (2001)
- Doctor (2011)
- There is a Little Hurt (2014)

=== Stories ===
- Small Features (1996)
- Revenge of the Minotaur (1999)
- What Will be Left to Us? (2001)
- Bitch (2002)
- Pushbutton Soldiers (2005)
- Shortest Path (2005)
- The Wheel of Fate (2009)
- There Overseas — Africa (2011)
- Chamber of Secrets (2011)
- Production Story (2012)
- Trouble the Water (2013)
- The Heart of the Enemy (2013)
- Vacation Courage (2014)
