= Saint Petersburg State University Institute of Chemistry =

Coordinates: 59.878715°N 29.835881°E

Saint Petersburg State University Faculty of Chemistry
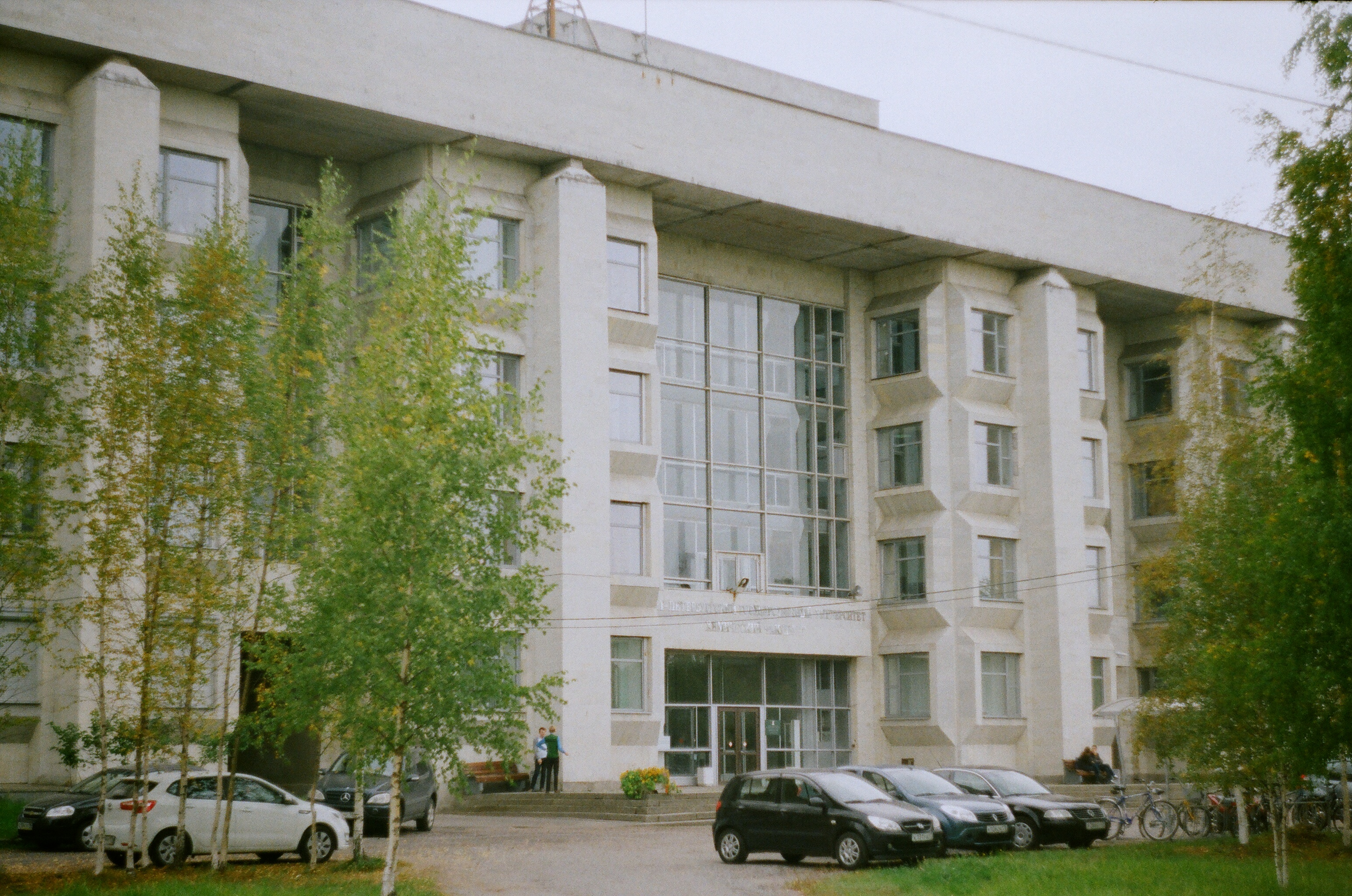
- Established: 1929
- Dean: Irina A. Balova
- Location: Saint Petersburg, Russia
- Website: http://en-chem.spbu.ru/

The Faculty of Chemistry (since 2014 The Institute of Chemistry) at Saint Petersburg State University is one of the leading chemistry faculties in Russia.

== History ==
Formally, the Department of Chemistry has been created as a separate entity of Saint Petersburg State University (then Leningrad State University) in 1929. However, the history of chemistry at Saint Petersburg State University began much earlier. First chemistry laboratory and lectures in chemistry were introduced at the university in 1833. Many Russian chemists began their career and/or worked there. Among them are Nikolay Zinin, Alexey Favorsky, Lev Aleksandrovich Chugaev, Sergei Vasiljevich Lebedev, Vyacheslav Tishchenko, Vladimir Ipatieff, Nikolay Semyonov, Boris Nikolsky, Mikhail Shultz. In the Soviet era, the Department of Chemistry continued to grow with new divisions: colloid chemistry (1939), electrochemistry (1940), chemistry of macromolecular compounds (1944), radiochemistry (1945), physical organic chemistry (1946), theory of solutions (1950), chemistry of natural compounds (1963), quantum chemistry (1967), solid state chemistry (1978).

== Campuses ==
Historically, some of the first chemistry offices were located in the main building of Saint Petersburg State University called Twelve Collegia. The remainder of these is the Mendeleev museum located on the first floor of the central part of this enormous building. In the 20th century, the Department of Chemistry was headquartered at 41/43 Sredniy prospekt on Vasilievsky Island, about one mile west of Twelve Collegia. In the 1980s, most of the laboratories were relocated to a more spacious building in the newly constructed campus in the suburb of Peterhof.

== Divisions ==
Currently, there are 14 scientific divisions in the chemistry department:

- Analytical chemistry
- Chemistry of macromolecular compounds
- Chemistry of natural compounds
- Colloid chemistry
- Electrochemistry
- General and Inorganic chemistry
- Laser Chemistry and Laser Material Science
- Organic chemistry
- Physical chemistry
- Physical organic chemistry
- Radiochemistry
- Quantum chemistry
- Solid state chemistry
- Chemical Thermodynamics and Kinetics
- Laboratory of Biomedical Chemistry
- Laboratory of Chemical Pharmacology
