= Gennadiy Prashkevich =

Russian writer

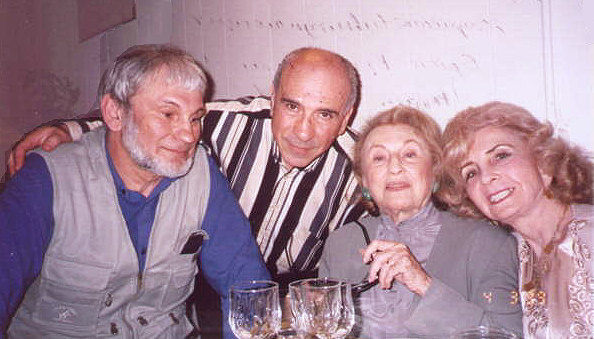
Gennadiy Prashkevich (leftmost) and Bel Kaufman (second from right).

Gennadiy Martovich Prashkevich (Russian: Генна́дий Ма́ртович Прашке́вич; born May 16, 1941, in Pirovskoye, Krasnoyarsk Krai) is a Russian science fiction writer, critic, editor, translator and International PEN member. He won the Aelita Prize (1994) and Garin-Mikhaylovsky Prize (1999). He is also a poet, translator and essayist.

Prashkevich graduated from Tomsk University and participated in various geological and paleontological expeditions to Ural, Kuzbass, Yakutia, Far East and Kamchatka. As a science fiction writer Prashkevich debuted with the story Ostrov Tumanov (The Island of Mists) in 1957, having close ties with Ivan Yefremov by that time.

== Works ==
- Razorvanoye chudo (The Torn Miracle, 1978)
- Pyat kostrov rombom (Five Bonfires In A Rhomb, 1989)
- Shpion protiv alkhimikov (A Spy Versus Alchemists, 1994)
- Shkatulka rytsarya (The Knight's Casket, 1996)

=== Verse books ===
- Posvyashcheniya (The Dedications, 1992)
- Spor s dyavolom (A Dispute With Devil, 1996)
