= Boris Nikolsky =

Soviet physical chemist and radiochemist

- Борис Никольский
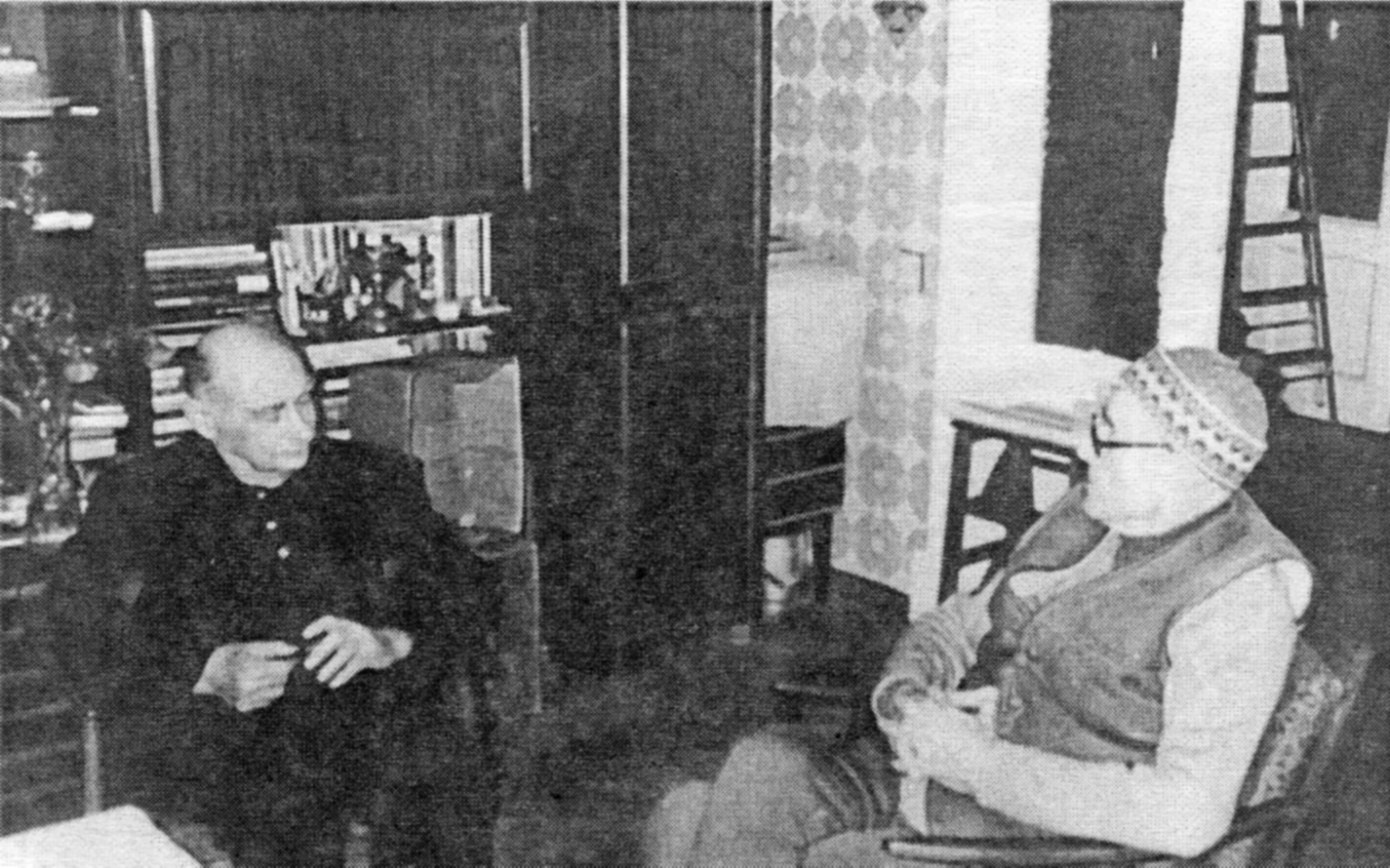
- Nikolsky (right) ca. 1989
- Born: 14 October [O.S. 1 October] 1900; Menzelinsk, Ufa Governorate in Russian Empire (Present day in Russian Federation)
- Died: 4 January 1990 (aged 89); Leningrad, Soviet Union; Now St. Petersburg, Russia)
- Citizenship: Soviet Union
- Education: Leningrad State University
- Known for: Theory of ion exchange in glass electrodes Plutonium chemistry
- Scientific career
- Fields: Chemistry
- Workplaces: Leningrad State University; Mayak
- Doctoral advisor: Mikhail Vrevsky
- Notable students: Alexey Storonkin; Mikhail Shultz

Boris Petrovich Nikolsky (Russian: Бори́с Петро́вич Нико́льский; 14 October [O.S. 1 October] 1900 – 4 January 1990), DN, was a Soviet chemist who played a crucial role in the former Soviet program of nuclear weapons.

Besides his work on the plutonium chemistry, Nikolsky did a pioneering work in ion exchanges applications in radiochemistry and physical chemistry, and was a professor of chemistry at the Leningrad University (now Saint Petersburg State University). He academician of the Soviet Academy of Sciences.

Boris Nikolsky was a 1925 graduate of Leningrad State University. In the 1930s he studied the ion exchange processes between aqueous solutions and solids. During that time Nikolsky developed the theory of ion exchange in glass electrodes. He derived equations that describe properties of glass electrodes as well as other types of ion-selective electrodes depending on chemical structure and multi-component composition of glass, concurrent interference of ions (see Nikolsky-Eisenman equation and Nikolsky-Shultz-Eisenman thermodynamic ion-exchange theory of GE) and so on. Boris Nikolsky also actively participated in the Soviet nuclear program. In 1952-1974 he was the senior scientist and the chairman of scientific committee at the Soviet nuclear fuel reprocessing plant Mayak, where he worked on the technology of processing and refining of plutonium. In 1961-1963 he was the chairman of the chemistry department at Leningrad State University.

== General publications on the glass electrode theory ==
- Nikolskii, B. P.. Theory of the glass electrode. I. Theoretical. // J. Phys. Chem. (U.S.S.R.) (1937), 10, 495-503.
- Nikolskii, B. P.; Tolmacheva, T. A. Theory of the glass electrode. II. Effect of boric anhydride and aluminum oxide on the electrode properties of glass. // J. Phys. Chem. (U.S.S.R.) (1937), 10, 504-12.
- Nikolskii, B. P.; Tolmacheva, T. A. Theory of the glass electrode. III. Transfer from the hydrogen electrode function into the sodium function. // J. Phys. Chem. (U.S.S.R.) (1937), 10, 513-23.

Boris Nikolsky was a co-author of the monumental textbook on physical chemistry and an editor-in-chief of the most comprehensive multivolume handbook of chemistry in Soviet Union.
