= Olga Larionova =

Russian science fiction writer

Olga Nikolayevna Tideman
- Born: 1935
- Died: 2003 (aged 67–68)
- Writing career
- Pen name: Olga Larionova
- Genre: science fiction
- Notable work: A Tale of Kings
- Notable awards: Aelita Prize

Olga Larionova (1935–2023) was the pen name of Olga Nikolayevna Tideman, a Russian science fiction author who began in the Soviet era. Her debut novel was A Leopard from the top of Kilimanjaro ("Леопард с вершины Килиманджаро") from 1965. Her story A Tale of Kings was in the anthology Earth and Elsewhere, which gained her notice in the West. She was one of the few successful female Russian science fiction writers of her generation. She won the Aelita Prize in 1987 and remains one of the few women to win it as an individual writer.
