= Volgograd State Pedagogical University =

Coordinates: 48°42′53″N 44°31′35″E

Volgograd State Socio-Pedagogical University
- Coat of arms of the Volgograd State Pedagogical University
- Type: Public
- Established: 1931
- Rector: Alexander Korotkov
- Students: over 13,200
- Location: Russia, Volgograd, Russia
- Campus: urban
- Website: www.vspu.ru

The Volgograd State Pedagogical University (Russian: Волгоградский государственный педагогический университет, abbreviation: VSPU) is one of the major pedagogical institutions in the Russian Federation. The university is located in Volgograd, formerly known as Stalingrad (Russia).

== History of the university ==
Established by decree of the Council of the People's Commissars of the USSR in 1931, it was previously known as the Stalingrad Industrial Pedagogical Institute. It was completely ruined during the Stalingrad battle of World War II and its library burnt out. In 1949, the school was renamed in honor of a Russian Proletarian writer, Alexander Serafimovich. Under political reforms of Nikita Khrushchev, the city was renamed from Stalingrad to Volgograd in 1961, and the name of the institution was changed to the Volgograd State Pedagogical Institute. In 1992 it was granted university status.

For ten years, the university stands amongst 10 best leading pedagogical and linguistic universities in Russia and 100 best universities worldwide.

Photograph of the building

== Structure of the university ==
Today, the urban structure of the university includes Institute of Primary and Special Education, Foreign Languages Institute, Institute of Art Education, and Institute of Computerized Pedagogics. There are four buildings on campus with over 13,000 students: 13,000 full-time and part-time students and about 200 post-graduates and foreign students who study at their own expense. Also, there is a branch of VSPU located in Mikhaylovka, Volgograd Oblast.

VSPU has 43 research centers and laboratories, 16 faculties, offers four-year bachelor (Russian: бакалавр) degrees, 33 two-year master (Russian: магистр) degrees and Candidate of Sciences (equals PhD) postgraduate degrees, and 6 Doctor of Sciences (equals Habilitation) post-doctoral degrees.

== Faculties and departments ==
Awards of the VSPU

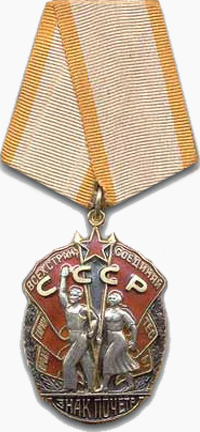
1981: Order of the Badge of Honour

- Mathematics
- Physics
- Natural sciences and geography
- History and law
- Economics and management
- Philology (Russian and literature)
- Foreign languages
- Psychology and social work
- Physical training
- Technology and service
- Primary school education
- Special education
- Visual arts
- Musical education
- Faculty for foreign students
- In-service training
- Vocational training

== Scientific research and academic relations ==
VSPU is a federal experimental base of the Russian Academy of Education, it is developing the ideas of continuous pedagogical education and interaction of pedagogics and school teaching techniques.

The university maintains international academic relations with higher education institutions o United States, Germany, Austria, Netherlands, France, People's Republic of China, Serbia, Czechoslovakia, Ukraine, and Kazakhstan.

== Library and publishing services ==
As of 2010, the VSPU library collection contained about 852,000 copies. Its fund of research literature on Psychology and Pedagogics is represented by the monographs by Yury Babansky, Pavel Blonsky, Vasily Vodovozov (ru:Водовозов, Василий Иванович), Vasily Vakhterov (ru:Вахтеров, Василий Порфирьевич), Anatoly Zak, Leonid Zankov (ru:Занков, Леонид Владимирович), John Amos Comenius, Peter Lesgaft, Anton Makarenko, Johann Heinrich Pestalozzi, Nikolay Pirogov, Vasyl Sukhomlynsky, Konstantin Ushinsky, Lev Vygotsky, Daniil Elconin (ru:Эльконин, Даниил Борисович, de:Daniil Borissowitsch Elkonin), and David Feldstein.

Scientific research results have been published ten times a year in the VSPU journal, titled Izvestia Volgogradskogo Pedagogicheskogo Universiteta (Russian: Известия Волгоградского государственного педагогического университета), ISSN 1815-9044.

== See also ==
- Russian educational system
- cs:Medaile Jana Amose Komenského (rozcestník) (John Amos Comenius Medal)
