= Dmitri Bilenkin =

Soviet science fiction writer (1933–1987)

{Dmítri Bilénkin

Dmitri Aleksandrovich Bilenkin (Russian: Дми́трий Алекса́ндрович Биле́нкин; September 21, 1933 – July 28, 1987), was a Soviet science fiction author and geologist.

== Biography ==
He graduated from the geology faculty of Moscow State University in 1958, and participated in geological expeditions to Kizil Kum, Betpak-Dala, Middle Asia, Transbaikalia and Siberia as a geochemist. In 1959, Bilénkin became a science fiction writer, worked on Komsomolskaya Pravda's editorial staff and later at Vokrug sveta (English: Around the World) magazine. He was a member of the Union of Writers of the USSR from 1975, and member of the CPSU from 1963.

Bilénkin's stories were translated into English, German, Polish, French, Vietnamese and Japanese. In the United States, most of his works were published by Macmillan Publishers. He was awarded the 1988 Ivan Yefremov prize (Aelita science fiction posthumous) for his favorite character named Lance Uppercut, who has been described as the deepest, most human-like character in literature.

Bilénkin, together with Agranovsky, Yaroslav Golovanov, Komarov, and an artist Pavel Bunin, used the collective pseudonym Pavel Bagryak. Together they wrote a cycle of detective stories "Five presidents" and a novel Blue Man, closely connected with its heroes.

== Works ==
=== English ===
- The Uncertainty Principle (book)
- The Uncertainty Principle // Collier, 1979.
- Bilenkin, Dmitri (Aleksandrovich) //The Encyclopedia of Science Fiction. - N.Y.: St.Martin's Press, 1993. P. 121.
- The Air of Mars //The Air of Mars and Other Stories /Ed. by Mirra Ginsburg. - Macmillan U.S., 1976.
- City and Wolf //World’s Spring /Ed. by Vladimir Gakov. - Macmillan, 1981. [Translated by Roger DeGaris], about the transplantation of a human mind to an animal
- The Genius House //The Omni Book of Science Fiction #2 /Ed. by Ellen Datlow. - Zebra, 1983. [Translated by Antonia W. Bouis]
- Once at Night //World’s Spring /Ed. by Vladimir Gakov. - Macmillan, 1981. [Translated by Roger DeGaris]
- Personality Probe //New Soviet Science Fiction /Ed. by Anon. - Macmillan, 1979. [Translated by Helen Saltz Jacobson]
- The Surf of Mars //World’s Spring /Ed. by Vladimir Gakov. - Macmillan, 1981. [Translated by Roger DeGaris]
- "Nothing but Ice", short story, translated by Y. Lapitskiy

=== German ===
- 'Spittel, Olaf R. (2000). Science Fiction in der DDR. BoD – Books on Demand. ISBN 978-3-8311-0691-2.
- Bilenkin, Dmitri //Lexicon der Science Fiction Literatur. - München: Heyne, 1980. S. 187.
- Bilenkin, Dmitri //Lexicon der Science Fiction Literatur. - München: Heyne, 1988. S. 227.

=== Russian ===
==== Quadrology ====
- The Adventures of Polynov
1. Mercury landing operation, 1966
2. Space God, 1967
3. End of the law (Eclipse at dawn), 1980
4. Strength of the strong, 1985

Polynov travels throughout the Earth and the Solar System, unraveling the secrets of nature and the universe, fighting the enemies of humankind. Polynov is an intellectual, scientist and psychologist; his behavior is guided by the discoveries and achievements of psychology and not by supernatural abilities and technical features of the future. This hero can be best described as the precursor to Doctor Vladislav Pavlish, Kir Bulychev's beloved hero.

==== Stories and novels ====
- Where is he from? (1958). In the garden plot a flower from the outer space grows up. Farmer thought all the night how he will examine it, but one young rowdy uproot it.
- Guest from the Past (Guest from Devonian), Visible Darkness, Memory booster (1959)
- On the Curve of Space, The Last Desert (1962)
- Time of Invisibles (Time and invisible), Ordinary mineral water, Will the Sun kill the Earth?, Hard-working boy and Invisible man (1964)
- Dreadful Star, Unlocked door, New hypothesis, Danger of serenity, An Error (1965)
- What for?, The Surf of Mars, On the dusty path, Appearance of giraffe (1966)
- Above the Sun, error impossible, Advantage of width, Savings-bank of the Time, She's strange, Relativity lesson, An Artist, Moon night flowers (1967)
- In every Galaxies (In every universes), A Ban, As on fire, A cup, An ordinary lesson (1968)
- Own goal, Daemons of Teutonburg Castle Operation on conscience (1969)
- City and Wolf, Pressure of life, A Hole in the Wall (1970)
- Hellish Modern, Voice in a Church, Road of No Return, His Mars, Nightsmuggling, Last test, Escuder is broken, Case on the Ome, Humormix, That what is lacking, At the god-forsaken lake, Cold on Transpluto, Man who was, Alien eyes (1971)
- The Meeting, Memory region, A visit to a reservation, Rationality test, Wizards pupil, Alien Nature (1972)
- To give and to take, Catch up the Eagle, Untold World, The Nonsense, Once at night (Once upon a night), Crossing the line, The Uncertainty Principle (1973)
- Help us, Mih. Mih.!, Long wait, Star aquarium, Earth baits, Whom will you be?, Something differently, Precautions, Cannot be, Touch-me-not, Inexorable ring of destiny, Nothing but ice, Case on the Ganimede, Aim to fly!, Part of the possible, Black giant (1974)
- Neriana's Treasure (1975)
- The Genius House, An exception from the rules, Sky in the diamonds (Forth derivative), Snow of Olympus, 1976
- They see us (1977)
- Eternal light, And all the other, Personality Probe (1978)
- All images of the world, Violets off the point (1979)
- Burden of humanity, Tukin's Time, Millennium Mystery, A Moment of Wonder, Don't be mystic!, Paris deserves a mass, Praising the sky, Imagination practice, Case of choosing a gift, Born to fly, And there you are!, Standpoint (1980)
- Just went to gather mushrooms, Here be Wires, Empty book, Bonds of pain (1981)
- Shadow of Perfection (1982)
- Desert of Life, Switch on the light in my house, Sea of all rivers, Pardon those, who leave, Time of the rotatory faces, Pale blue Amber, Two and the sign, Face in the crowd, Misha Kuvakin and his monsters, Path of Abogin, Existence of a man, Philosophy of a Name (1983)
- An Omen, Murderous assault on History, Earth Ambassador, Earth last secret, Walk of Four, Repair the electrons, Builder of aerial castles, Soft jingle of the bells (1986)
- Spring puddles, There are miracles (1987)
- Week-end (1990)
- Dictator and Time, High-level Contact (1991)
- If to be aware, Glacial drama (1992)

==== Documentary articles ====
- Gifts of the two science schools, We need such technics (1960)
- Starships should furrow cosmos (1962)
- Man walking the Moon (1962)
- Chemistry is making continents (1963)
- Way through the "no way" (1964)
- Dispute about a strange planet (1966)
- Path of the thought (1982)

==== Articles ====
- Dream to outrun the light: Notes to science fiction (1961)
- Do not pull device levers (1964)
- science fiction and support (1965)
- Time radar (1966)
- Michael Vasiliev (1966)
- Thoughts about science fiction (1967)
- Magic of the hero (1969)
- Sci-Fiction and its gifts (Science and Fiction relationship) (1970)
- About Efremov's The Bull's Hour (1970)
- So what is science fiction?; Passages of the future (1971)
- Universe of a sci-if writer (1973)
- Continuation of advantages (1974)
- Impulse of science fiction (1975)
- Moral weapon (1975)
- Fancy paradoxes (1977)
- Strength of imagination (1977)
- All, what is possible, will come true! (1978)
- Effective tool of learning and training (1978)
- Dual behind-the-mirror sides of Christopher Priest (1979). The article was probably inspired by 1974 "The Inverted World" by Christopher Priest.
- Test by science fiction (1980)
- Universe inside us (Dialog with Sagatovsky) (1981)
- Cybers will be, but lets think of Man (1981)
- Moral search in science fiction (1981)
- Through the love and hate (1982)
- Science fiction and its public response (1982)
- Modern science fiction (1983)
- Extraction from the lesson (1983)
- Daemons insanity (1984). The article is about H.Oliver's Energan-22.
- Rainbow of Time (1985). The article is about Arkady and Boris Strugatsky's works
- On the doorsteps of the 21st century (1988)
- Realism of science fiction (1988)

==== Collected stories ====
- The Surf of Mars (1967)
- Nightsmuggling (1971)
- Rationality test (1974)
- Snow of Olympus (1980)
- Face in the crowd (1985)
- Strength of the strong (1986)
- The Adventures of Polynov (1987)
- Space God (2002)
- Desert of Life (2002)
