= Mikhail Shultz =

Soviet and Russian physical chemist

Mikhail Mikhailovich Shultz
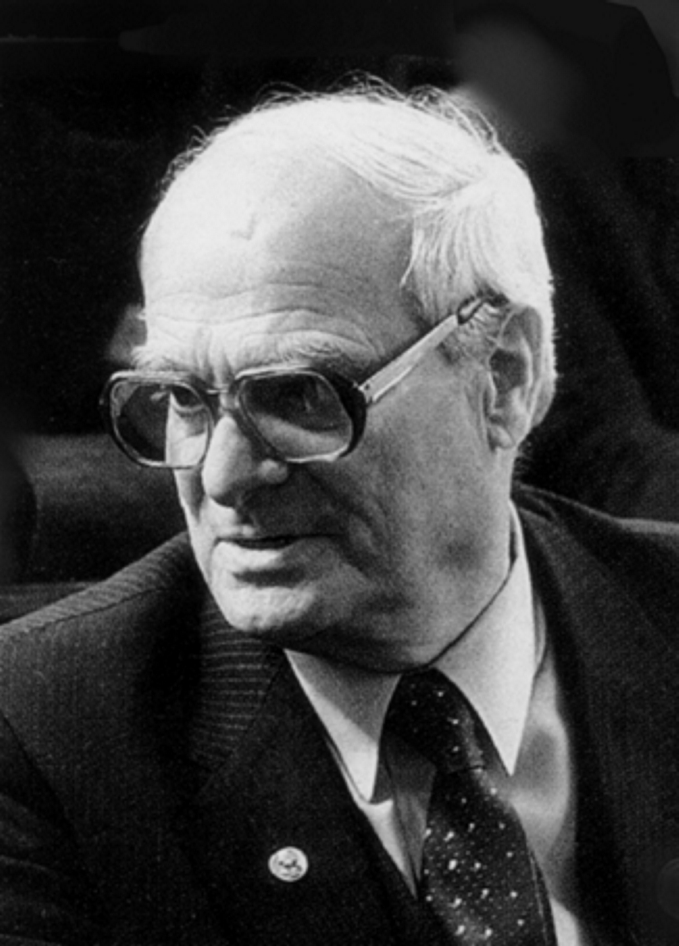
- Mikhail Shultz
- Born: 1 July 1919; Petrograd, RSFSR
- Died: 9 October 2006 (aged 87); St. Petersburg
- Citizenship: RSFSR, USSR, Russia
- Education: Leningrad State University
- Known for: Theory of glasses, theory of the glass electrode
- Scientific career
- Fields: physical chemistry
- Workplaces: Leningrad State University, Institute of Silicate Chemistry
- Doctoral advisor: Boris Nikolsky, Alexey Storonkin

Mikhail Mikhaylovich Shultz (Russian: Михаи́л Миха́йлович Шульц, also spelled Schultz, Shul'ts, Shults, Shul'c etc.) (1 July 1919 – 9 October 2006) was a Soviet and Russian physical chemist, and an artist.

In Russia and throughout the world, Shultz is primarily known for his research into chemical thermodynamics of heterogeneous chemical compounds, electrochemistry of glasses, and membrane electrochemistry. He is also known for his work in the field of ion exchange and phase equilibria of multicomponent compounds, and theory of glass electrode. Shultz also worked on a thermal protection system for the Soviet Buran spacecraft and is credited with research in optical fibres in the 1980s.

His works helped to contribute to the creation of early pH-meters and ionometry, production organisation, instrumentation and materials commonly used in medicine, chemical and nuclear industry, aviation rocket and space technology, agriculture and many other areas.

== Biography ==
Mikhail Shultz was a son of Mikhail Alexandrovich Shultz (1896–1954; the Naval officer, belonging to the latest issue of the Imperial Naval Cadet Corps — 1916) and a great-grandson of the Russian physicist Dmitry Aleksandrovich Lachinov (1842–1902).

M. Shultz was a descendant of the German sculptor, the Danish royal medallist Anton Schultz (Anton Schultz — Schleswig-Holstein, Saxony, Hamburg, Denmark, XVII–XVIII cc.) who carried out orders the Russian Court as early as Copenhagen, and arrived at the service in Russia with Peter the Great.

He was born on 1 July 1919 in Petrograd. In 1937, he graduated with honours from a high school in Staraya Russa; where he had been deported with his mother Helen (née Barsukova) back in 1929. His father M. A. Shultz was arrested in 1925 as a suspect in the "counter-revolutionary monarchist conspiracy"; he spent 10 years in Solovki prison camp, and 3 years on the construction of the Moscow Canal. released in 1937, rehabilitated in 1991.

1937–1941—a student of the chemical faculty of the Leningrad State University (M. Schulz, was a talented artist—when he arrived in Leningrad in 1937, he was faced a choice: to enter the Academy of Fine Arts, or go to university, ... and although he considered himself a dilettante, his works show the realisation of talent for this part), in 1938—joined the All-Union Chemical Society named by D. I. Mendeleev, in 1941–1945—a volunteer on The Great Patriotic War, first lieutenant, chief of the chemical service of battalion.

== Scientific career ==
- 1947—graduated with honours from the Chemical faculty of the Leningrad State University;
- 1947—1950 – the postgraduate under the supervision of Professor Boris Petrovich Nikolsky).
- 1951—the Candidate of chemical sciences (thesis "Study of sodium function of glass electrodes").
- 1950–1959—the Assistant and from 1953—the associate professor of physical chemistry chair of the Leningrad State University Chemical faculty, cooperation with Professor Aleksey Vasilyevich Storonkin, his second teacher, in the field of thermodynamics of heterogeneous systems.
- 1956–1972—Head of Laboratory of the electrochemistry of glass, which he founded in the Research Institute of Chemistry of the Leningrad State University, which together with a number of other institutions was carrying out the government order to develop means of pH-metry (since 1954; including the monitoring of nuclear and plutonium synthesis), he organised a systematic study of electrode properties of glasses, depending on their composition.
- 1965—the Doctor of chemical sciences (thesis: "Electrode properties of glasses"), approved in the rank of professor exercises.
- 1967—1972—the dean of the Leningrad State University Chemical faculty.
- 1972—the corresponding member of the USSR Academy of Sciences.
- 1972–1998—the director of the Institute of Silicate Chemistry (USSR Academy of Sciences; later — Russian Academy of Sciences); in that period a new building was constructed and the institute square tripled.
- 1975–1990—the chief editor of the magazine Physics and Chemistry of Glass of the USSR Academy of Sciences (established by Shultz; released since 1975).
- 1979—the academician (the USSR Academy of Sciences; from 1991—RAS).

== Scientific accomplishments ==
Mikhail Shultz is the author of fundamental works on physical chemistry, thermodynamics, chemistry and electrochemistry of glass, membrane electrochemistry, the theory of ion-exchange and phase equilibria of multi-component systems, for a total of more than 500 scientific papers, including several monographs, and approximately 20 inventions

=== Glass electrode ===
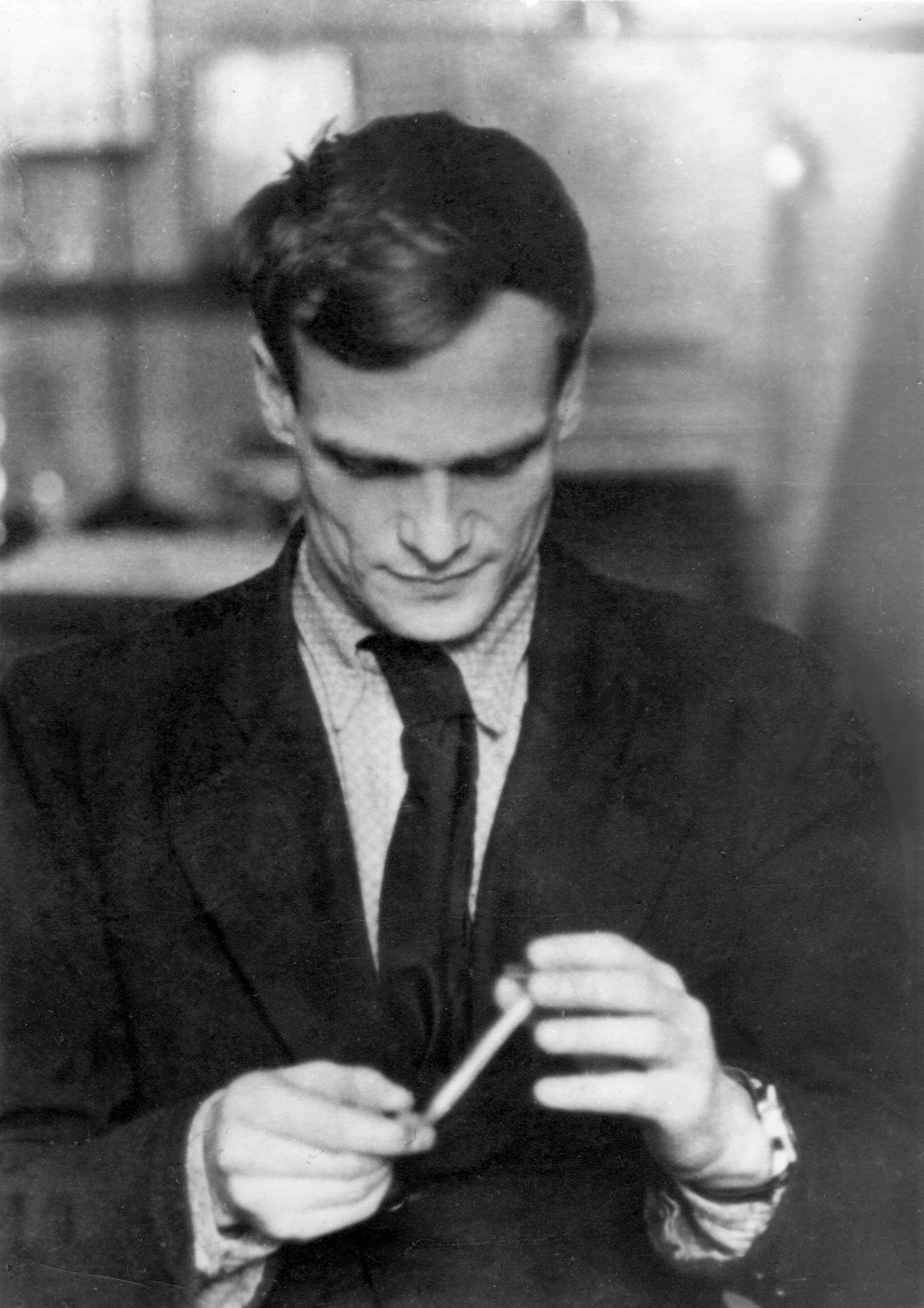
Schultz holding a glass electrode, 1951.

His name had to do with the beginning of developing pH-metry and ionometry, the creation and organisation of measuring equipment production, widely used in medicine, chemical and nuclear industry, aerospace technology, agriculture and many other fields.

In 1951 M. Shultz strictly thermodynamically proved the sodium function of different glasses in various areas of pH, which anticipated many directions of further studies, and his work "Studies of sodium functions of glass electrodes" is regarded as one of the most considerable in relation to all those written on the glass electrode (it was very important step for realisation ion-exchange theory of the glass electrode, and it has become an important part in the thermodynamic ion-exchange theory of GE Nikolsky-Shultz-Eisenman).

His achievements in solving the fundamental problems of chemical thermodynamics are noteworthy. Special mention should be made of the generalisation of the stability conditions for the Gibbs equilibrium to heterogeneous (multicomponent, multiphase) systems (1954). M. Shultz developed a method for calculating changes in the thermodynamic properties of a heterogeneous system from data on the composition of the coexisting phases and on the change in the chemical potential of only one component («method of the third component», so called else «Shultz-Storonkin's method»). In the frame of the thermodynamic theory existing is the «Filippov-Shultz rule».

The first results of the study of the Mössbauer effect in iron-containing glasses are mentioned in the thesis of Mikhail Shultz. Data from M. Schulz and staff of his laboratory are of exceptional interest for interpretation of Mössbauer's spectra, where the range assessment all of possible states of iron atoms is extremely wide and difficult. M. Shultz demonstrated the possibility to get a glass electrode with redox function (1964), which allowed to create a fundamentally new measuring technique, without the use of measuring precious metals, and that gave a huge economic impact. The industrial production of pH-meters was originated and connected with his name.

In the 1950–1960 on the basis of representative series of glasses M. Shultz with collaborators estimated the impact of the third component on electrode properties of alkaline-silicate glasses (practically any element of the periodical system of D. I. Mendeleev, capable to be present at glass, was involved as that component).

According to the concept of glass developed by M. Shultz, in analogy with pH for aqueous solutions, he proposed an innovative idea to establish for glasses and melts—the degree of acidity pO (negative logarithm of the activity of oxygen ions O^{2−}) and standards for methods of measurement: pO is inversely proportional to the degree of basicity and concentration of the oxide.

=== Silicon chemistry ===
Under the guidance of M. Shultz developed the heat resistant silicone and carbon-fiber based coatings for the protection of structural materials of various spacecrafts (including military rockets, and for the spacecraft Buran, similar to Space Shuttle thermal protection system) and thin-film coatings used for semiconductor wafers, organo-silicate corrosion-resistant, anti-icing, dielectric, thermally insulating, radiation-proof coatings for construction, electrical engineering and shipbuilding materials. Large enough the contribution of the scientist is in the sphere of developing new construction materials. In 1981 Shultz published paper on the optical fiber made out of pure cristobalite and silicone shell.

M. Shultz is the founder of one of Russian scientific schools. Under his leadership 45 people maintained candidate theses, 8 people of his school became Doctors of Sciences, members of the Russian Academy of Sciences.

In July 1989, M. Shultz was the president of the 15th International Congress on Glass held in Leningrad. It is his merit that in 1979 Russia was admitted to the most authoritative organisation of that profile—International Commission on Glass, founded in 1933. He was a president of the Russian Ceramic Society (1995–2002).

== Awards and academic recognition ==
- The Hero of Socialist Labour (1991);
- The Order of Lenin (2 Orders);
- The Order of the Red Banner of Labour (2 Orders);
- The Order of the Patriotic War, II grade (2 Orders);
- Twice the USSR State Prize laureate (1973, 1986);
- The academician of the USSR Academy of Sciences (1979; 1991—RAS);
- 1999—The Russian Academy of Sciences Prize by name of I. V. Grebenschikov for series of papers «Thermodynamics and chemical structure of oxide melts and glasses»
- 2003—The Prize by name of D. I. Mendeleev of the St.Petersburg Government and the St.-Petersburg Scientific Center of RAS (one of three scientists awarded on the occasion of 300 anniversary of St. Petersburg)
- 1954—laureat University Award;
- 1956—winner of the first university prize for his work «Theory of the glass electrode» — with co-authors, the order of the rector of Leningrad State University (A. D. Aleksandrov) from 25 February 1957;
- 1998—Honorary Professorship of the Saint Petersburg State Institute of Technology.
- 2005—Honorary Professorship of St. Petersburg State University.
- Avicenna reporter (2.X.1981, Dushanbe).
- Mendeleev reader (24.III.1983, St.Petersburg).
- 1996—Winner of the International Academic Publishing Company (MIAK) Nauka-Interperiodica for a series of articles «Thermodynamics of glasses and glass-forming melts: theory and experiment»;
- 2000—Winner of the International Academic Publishing Company (MIAK) Nauka-Interperiodica for the series of articles «Modern Thermodynamics and theoretical studies»;

He was a member of numerous scientific state and international commissions and committees, and scientific societies.

Member of editor's boards of several Russian and foreign scientific journals.

== See also ==
- Glass electrode
