= Uralsky Sledopyt =

Russian monthly magazine

- Categories: Tourism
- Publisher: The Central Ural Publishing House (till 1993)
- Founded: 1958; 68 years ago
- Country: Russia
- Based in: Yekaterinburg
- Language: Russian

Uralsky Sledopyt (Russian: Уральский Следопыт, Ural Pathfinder) is a Soviet and Russian magazine dedicated to tourism and local history. It also has a science fiction section. It is printed in Yekaterinburg (formerly Sverdlovsk), Russia, located on the eastern side of the Ural mountain range, hence the name of the magazine.

In 1981 the magazine established the Aelita Prize for science fiction.
