= Bobrov =

Bobrov (masculine) or Bobrova (feminine) may refer to:

== People ==
- Bobrov (surname) (Bobrova), Russian surname
- Bobrov, pseudonym of Mark Natanson, Russian revolutionary

== Places ==
- Bobrov Urban Settlement, an administrative division and a municipal formation which the town of Bobrov and three rural localities in Bobrovsky District of Voronezh Oblast, Russia are incorporated as
- Bobrov, Russia, several inhabited localities in Russia
- Bobrov, Slovakia, a village and municipality in Slovakia
- Bobrová, a town in the Czech Republic

== See also ==
- Bobrovsky, several rural localities in Russia
