= Bobrov (surname) =

Bobrov (Russian: Бобро́в), or Bobrova (feminine; Бобро́ва) is a Russian surname, derived from the word бобёр 'beaver'. Notable people with the surname include:

== Bobrov ==
- Alexander Bobrov (1850–1904), Russian surgeon
- Fyodor Bobrov (1898–1944), Soviet army officer and Hero of the Soviet Union
- Leonid Bobrov (1920–1988), Soviet aircraft pilot and Hero of the Soviet Union
- Nikolay Alexandrovich Bobrov (1921–1942), Soviet aircraft pilot and Hero of the Soviet Union
- Nikolay Galaktionovich Bobrov (1923–1943), Soviet army officer and Hero of the Soviet Union
- Semyon Bobrov (1767/8–1810), Russian poet
- Viktor Bobrov (ice hockey) (born 1984), Russian ice hockey player
- Viktor Bobrov (painter) (1842–1918), Russian painter
- Vladimir Bobrov (born 1953), Kazakhstani politician
- Vladimir Ivanovich Bobrov (1915–1970), Soviet aircraft pilot and Hero of the Soviet Union, Spanish Republican Air Force air ace
- Vsevolod Bobrov (1922–1979), Russian hockey and football player, trainer
- Yelisey Bobrov (1778–1830), Russian actor
- Yevgeny Bobrov (1867–1933), Russian philosopher
- Yevgeny Grigoryevich Bobrov (1902–1983), Russian botanist

== Bobrova ==
- Ekaterina Bobrova (born 1990), Russian ice dancer
- Lidia Bobrova (born 1952), Russian film director
- Natalia Bobrova (1978-2015), Russian artistic gymnast
