= Vokrug sveta =

Russian geographic magazine

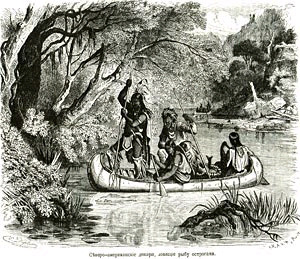
- An illustration from the 1861 issue of Vokrug sveta.
- Categories: Geography
- Founded: 1861
- Country: Russia
- Based in: Saint Petersburg
- Language: Russian
- Website: http://www.vokrugsveta.ru/

Vokrug sveta (Russian: Вокруг света, literally: "Around the World") is a Russian geographic magazine. It is the longest running magazine in the Russian language. The first issue was printed in Saint Petersburg, in December 1861, almost thirty years before the establishment of the National Geographic Magazine. Thus, it is one of the oldest popular science magazines in the world. Release of Vokrug sveta was suspended twice: from 1918 to 1927, during the Russian Revolution, and from 1941 to 1945, during World War II. Nevertheless, the magazine always resumed and continues to be published to this day.

== History ==
=== Before the Revolution ===
The magazine was conceived by a Warsaw-born entrepreneur, Maurycy Bolesław Wolff, who defined Vokrug Sveta as a lavishly illustrated yearly publication, dedicated to "physical geography, natural sciences, the most recent discoveries, inventions and observations". Its roster of authors included: Alfred Brehm, Camille Flammarion, Nikolai Przhevalsky and Nicholai Miklukho-Maklai.

The Wolff edition was discontinued after 1868 for unclear reasons, but the project of a popular geographical journal was revived in 1885 by Ivan Sytin, a printer who directed his periodicals toward a wider audience. Sytin's Vokrug sveta was issued monthly and featured original translations of popular adventure fiction from such authors as Jules Verne, Rudyard Kipling and Arthur Conan Doyle.

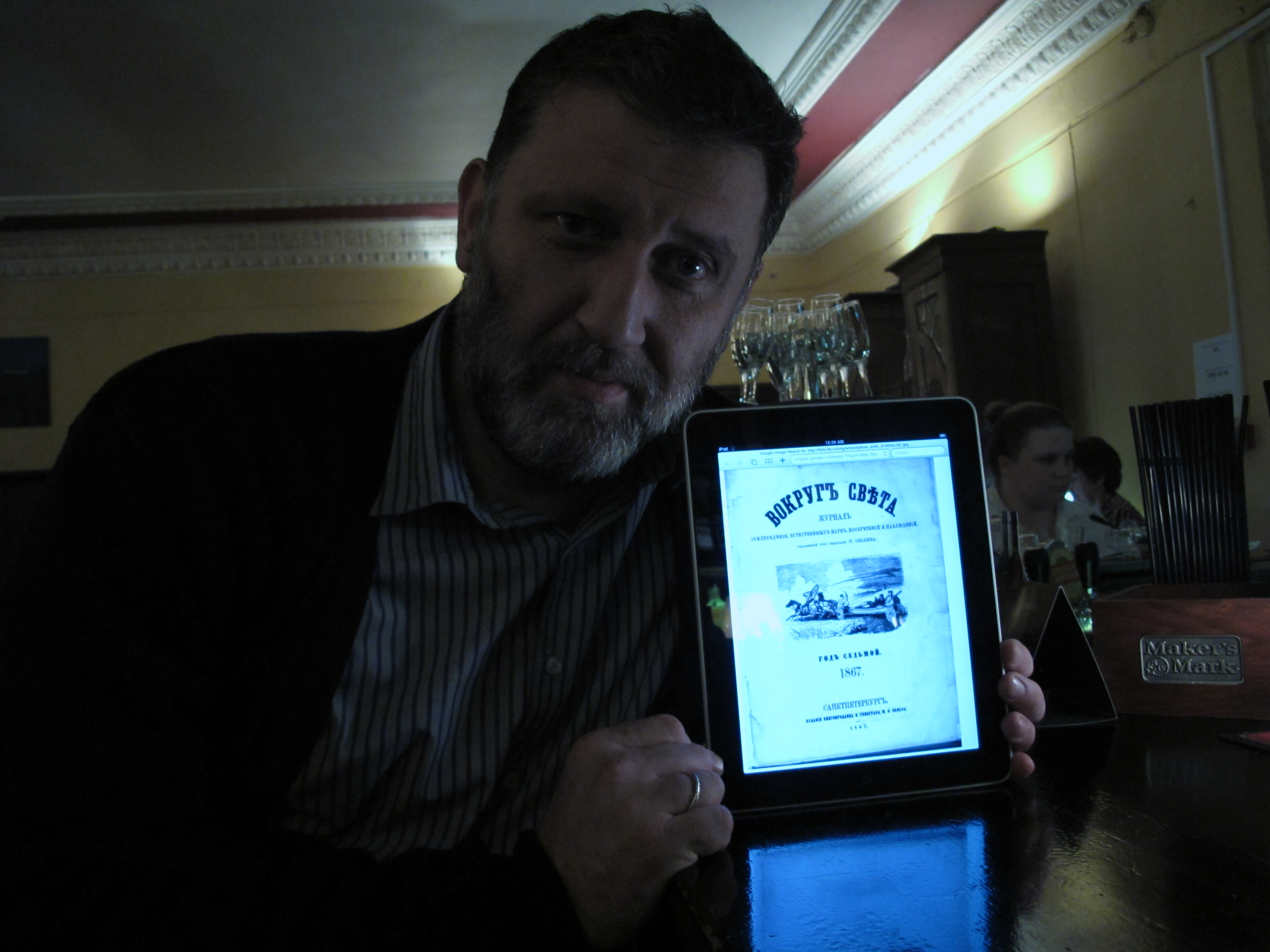
Sergey Parkhomenko, the magazine's editor-in-chief, showing a digitized 1867 edition of Vokrug sveta

=== After the Revolution ===
The Russian Revolution brought this period of the magazine's history to an abrupt termination. Like many other periodicals of Imperial Russia, Vokrug sveta suspended publication for ten years. It was back in print under the auspices of the Young Communist League, specifically targeted toward the youth audience. Contributing editors included some of the finest Soviet science fiction authors, including Alexander Belayev, Vladimir Obruchev and Ivan Yefremov. In 1938, the magazine's headquarters relocated, from Leningrad to Moscow and its publication was altogether suspended during World War II.

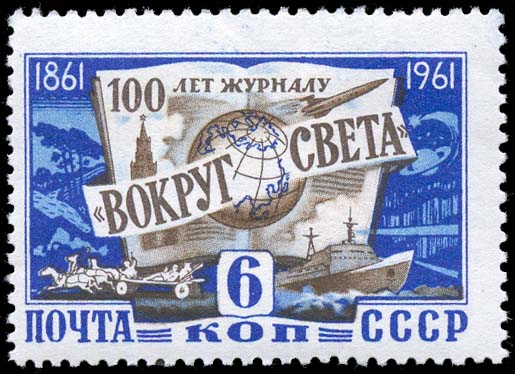
1961 stamp marking the centenary of Vokrug sveta

For Soviet readers, Vokrug sveta represented a rare source of authentic, fully illustrated information about foreign cultural attractions. This is despite the insistence of Soviet officials that the magazine should cover domestic tourist attractions, rather than those situated outside the USSR. In the 1960s and 1970s, the magazine continued to grow in popularity and increased the circulation to 2,300,000 copies by 1971. A television subsidiary was also popular, particularly in the early 1990s. As of 2007, Vokrug sveta ranks third among Russia's popular monthlies, with a circulation hovering around 250,000. The free archives of past issues (starting from 1970) are available on their website.
