= Professor Wagner's Inventions =

Series of science fiction short stories

Professor Wagner's Inventions is a series of science fiction short stories and novellas by Russian writer Alexander Belyayev.

== Background ==
At these times works of Soviet science fiction had to operate within the strict boundaries of scientific credibility. Therefore, to present his most outlandish fantastic ideas Belyayev disguised them as humorous stories, arranged into the series Professor Wagner's Inventions. Professor Wagner had an infinite power over the nature: he made his body to remove the toxins than make a person sleepy, transplanted the brain of his perished assistant to an elephant, learned how to walk through walls, etc. Wagner lived through the Russian Revolution and accepted the Soviet power.

Иван Степанович Вагнер is professor of Biology Department of the 1st Moscow University (fictional). He trained his two halves of the brain to operate independently, to increase productivity, and what is more, he did not need to sleep. He has a secluded dacha in Simeiz and when he lives there, he delivers lectures at the university over radio.

== Works ==
- A Man who does not Sleep (сборник «Голова профессора Доуэля». М., «ЗиФ», 1926)
- A Guest from the Boookcase («Всемирный следопыт» 1926, No. 9; сборник «Голова профессора Доуэля». М., «ЗиФ», 1926)
- Above the Abyss («Вокруг света» (Москва) 1927, No. 2-3)
- Devil's Mill («Всемирный следопыт», 1929, No. 9)
- Manufactured Legends and Apocrypha: «Случай с лошадью», «О блохах», «Человек-термо» («Всемирный следопыт» 1929, No. 4)
- Amba («Всемирный следопыт», 1929, No. 10)
- Hoity Toity («Всемирный следопыт», 1930, No. 1—2)
- Magic carpet (Znanie — Sila, 1936, No. 12)

In addition, in 1926 Belyayev wrote a short story about anabiosis, Neither Life nor Death where he first introduced professor Wagner, although he did not include the story in the cycle and it was reprinted only in his collection of works in 1963.
