= The Air Seller =

1929 novel by Alexander Belyayev

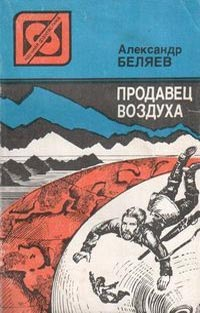
- Author: Alexander Belayev
- Original title: Продавец воздуха
- Language: Russian
- Genre: Science fiction
- Publication date: 1928

The Air Seller (Russian: Продавец воздуха, also translated in 2016 as The Air Merchant) is a science fiction novel by Russian writer Alexander Belayev. It was first published in 1929, in several issues of Vokrug Sveta magazine. The first book edition was in 1956.

== Plot ==
Meteorologist Georgiy Klimenko and his Yakut guide Nikola are investigating a strange wind anomaly in Yakutia, Russian Far East, when they are caught prisoner by a villain businessman Bayley. With a gigantic air-sucking device, built by Swedish scientist Engelbrecht, Bayley is slowly stealing the Earth's atmosphere. The deeply frozen oxygen is stored in a vast cryogenic warehouse. Bayley plans to create a deficit of oxygen and then to start selling fresh air, thus eventually becoming the master of the world. He even boasts of having trade relations with Martians, though the credibility of this claim is left unclear.

Engelbrecht's daughter Nora is sympathetic to the prisoners. She helps Nikola to escape and warn the Soviets of the danger. However, the Red Army is unable to assault Bayley's base directly, since that would risk an explosive vaporization of the frozen air (Bayley demonstrates the possible consequences by releasing a portion of said air, leveling enormous areas of Siberia and the Europe). Bayley holds Nora hostage in order to keep Engelbrecht under control. Realising the danger Bayley's plans impose to the Earth, Nora commits suicide by exposing herself to the frozen oxygen. Now free and lusting for revenge, Engelbert sides with Klimenko. The base is finally stormed by the Red Army, shown a safe passage in by the escaped Nikola. Bayley, facing imminent capture, swallows some frozen air balls and explodes.

== Film adaptation ==
The novel was adapted into film with the same name in 1967 by Odessa Film Studio, director Vladimir Ryabtsev, with Artyom Karapetian as Bayley and Gennady Nilov as Klimenko. In 2019 the Ukrainian "musical archaeology" label "Shukai" had found and restored the soundtrack of the film (composer Viktor Vlasov) and released album with it together with some unused songs prepared for the film.
