= Ash of Gods: Redemption =

2018 video game

- Developer: AurumDust
- Publishers: AurumDust; Buka Entertainment (Note: Console release)
- Director: Nikolay Bondarenko
- Designer: Dmitry Erokhin
- Programmer: Alexander Bogomolets
- Artist: Igor Podmogilnikov
- Writers: Sergey Malitsky; Dmitry Erokhin; Nikolay Bondarenko
- Composers: Adam Skorupa; Krzysztof Wierzynkiewicz; Michał Cielecki
- Engine: Unity (game engine)
- Platforms: Linux; macOS; Microsoft Windows; Android; iOS; Nintendo Switch; PlayStation 4; Xbox One
- Release: March 23, 2018
- Genre: Tactical role-playing
- Modes: Single-player, multiplayer

Ash of Gods: Redemption is a tactical role-playing video game developed by AurumDust. Gameplay blends elements of the visual novel, roguelite, and digital collectible card game elements. The game is written by Russian author Sergey Malitsky.

== Gameplay ==
The story is presented in a form of a dark fantasy visual novel, with nonlinear plot development. The game's story is defined by the actions the player makes and the dialogue choices. The storytelling is built on the sequence of moral choices where each of the player's decisions significantly affects the further development of events. The crucial aspect here is the principle of "less evil": the player must constantly choose between the quick profit that may lead to unpleasant events in the future and the sacrifice that, in the opposite, will make easier the completing of one of the following episodes. Due to the game's roguelike influence, the story continues even after the protagonist's death.

The combat is turn-based in an isometric perspective. Battle skills not only use a character's energy but their health as well. Besides that, the player can use a pack of cards which are analogues of mighty spells. Formation of the pack, issuance of the cards during the battle and their usage are in many ways similar to classical collectible card games. Thus, the cards that player receives at the beginning of the battle are defining the player's strategy, while the characters that he has on the field are defining his tactics.

== Plot ==
In a world named Terminus, based on High Medieval western Europe in terms of technology and moral development, the player takes control over several groups of characters, each headed by one of the major protagonists. There are three of them in the game: the retired captain of the royal guard Thorn Brenin, the wandering healer Hopper Rouley and the professional hitman Lo Pheng. These heroes find themselves at the threshold of events which are menacing to grow into the end of civilization.

== Development ==
Development of Ash of Gods: Redemption began in 2016. According to AurumDust's CEO Nikolay Bondarenko, he developed the game's concept of a ramified system of moral choices several years earlier.

On May 23, 2017, AurumDust Studio launched a Kickstarter campaign for Ash of Gods: Redemption, which had a $75,000 goal. Chapters of novels by Sergey Malitsky, which were the literary basis of the game's script, are published on AurumDust's website. The game was released on March 23, 2018.

== Soundtrack ==
The soundtrack for Ash of Gods: Redemption is created by composers Adam Skorupa (soundtracks for Max Payne 2, Painkiller, The Witcher and EVE Online), Krzysztof Wierzynkiewicz and Michał Cielecki.

== Reception ==
The game received mixed reviews on Metacritic. Spencer Rutledge of HardcoreGamer.com wrote, "Ash of Gods swings back and forth between being immensely enjoyable and feeling like it could be doing things so much better". Some critics compared it negatively to The Banner Saga. P. J. O'Reilly of Nintendo Life said that it "wants to be The Banner Saga so bad it hurts" but is "a hollow, infuriating, badly-written and bewilderingly punitive effort".
