= Ariel (novel) =

1941 novel by Alexander Belyayev

- Author: Alexander Beliaev
- Language: Russian
- Genre: Science fiction
- Publication date: 1941
- Publication place: USSR

Ariel (Russian: Ариэль) is a science fiction novel by Alexander Beliaev published for the first time in 1941.

The main character, Ariel, has the power to fly without any device as a result of a scientific experiment aimed at creation of this ability. He and a young friend escape from the school where they were confined. In the course of the events, Ariel discovers that he is English and was taken to that special school in India because he and his sister were rich, and that he was given into custody to people who wanted his money.

The novel was made into a film Спутник планеты Уран, Uzbekfilm directed by Khadji Ahmar in 1990 and into a film in 1992, directed by Yevgeni Kotov.
