= Kolomna =

City in Moscow Oblast, Russia

Kolomna Коломна
- City
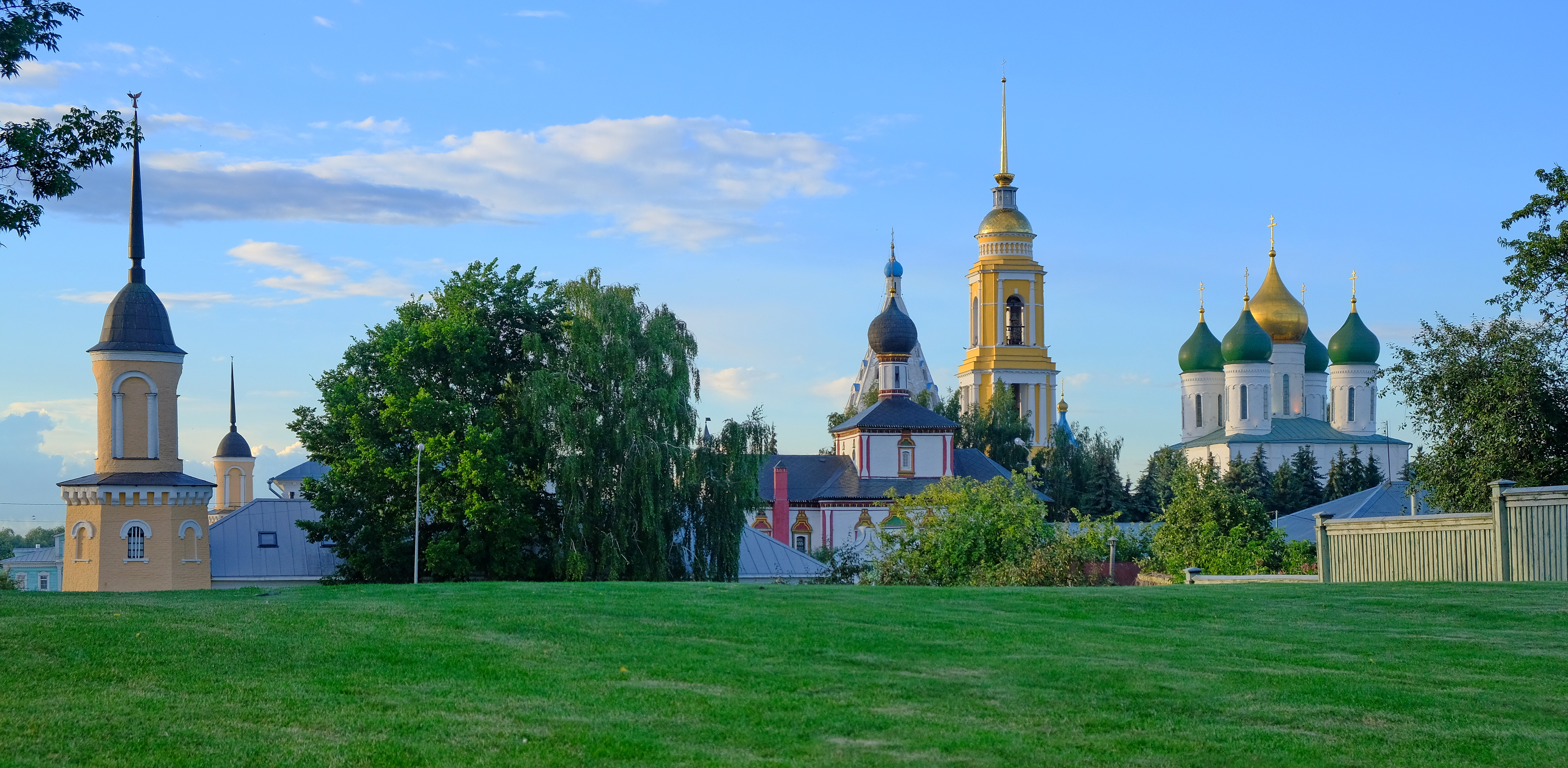
- Historic center of Kolomna

- Flag Coat of arms
- Interactive map of Kolomna
- Location of Kolomna Kolomna (Moscow Oblast)
- Coordinates: 55°05′N 38°47′E
- Country: Russia
- Federal subject: Moscow Oblast
- Founded: 1177

Government
  - Body: Council of Deputies
  - Head: Valery Shuvalov

Area
  - Total: 67.12 km^{2} (25.92 sq mi)
- Elevation: 185 m (607 ft)

Population (2010 Census)
  - Total: 144,589
  - Estimate (2025): 132,772 (−8.2%)
  - Rank: 119th in 2010
  - Density: 2,154/km^{2} (5,579/sq mi)

Administrative status
  - Subordinated to: Kolomna City Under Oblast Jurisdiction
  - Capital of: Kolomensky District, Kolomna City Under Oblast Jurisdiction

Municipal status
  - Urban okrug: Kolomna Urban Okrug
  - Capital of: Kolomna Urban Okrug, Kolomensky Municipal District
- Time zone: UTC+3 (MSK)
- Postal code: 140400
- Dialing code: +7 496
- OKTMO ID: 46738000001
- Website: www.kolomnagrad.ru

Kolomna (Russian: Коломна, IPA: [kɐˈlomnə]) is a historic city in Moscow Oblast, Russia, situated at the confluence of the Moskva and Oka Rivers, 114 kilometers (71 mi) (by rail) southeast of Moscow. Population: 144,589 (2010 census); 150,129 (2002 census); 161,881 (1989 Soviet census).

== History ==
Mentioned for the first time in 1177, Kolomna was founded in 1140–1160 according to the latest archaeological surveys. Kolomna's name may originate from the Old Russian term for "on the bend (of the river)", especially as the old city is located on a sharp bend of the Moscow River. In January 1238, Kolomna was destroyed by a Mongol invasion. In 1301, Kolomna became the first town to be incorporated into the Moscow Principality.

Like some other ancient Russian cities, it has a kremlin, which is a citadel similar to the more famous one in Moscow and also built of red brick. The stone Kolomna Kremlin was built from 1525–1531 under the Russian Tsar Vasily III. The Kolomna citadel was a part of the Great Abatis Border and, although much of the surrounding wall was removed in the eighteenth century and materials used to construct other public buildings, the remaining stretch of wall, several towers, and some interior buildings have been preserved and held in good shape with a museum located inside. In front of the façade stands a statue of Dmitry Donskoy, celebrating the gathering of his troops in Kolomna prior to the Battle of Kulikovo in 1380.

The civic arms of Kolomna were granted by Empress Catherine II, who was influenced by the similar-sounding name of the famous Colonna family of Rome. Hence, the similar appearance of the arms, despite there being no connection between the Roman family and the city of Kolomna.

Due to sensitive military production of missile components, Kolomna was a closed city until 1994. It is not listed as a city of the Golden Ring, despite its kremlin and the large number of well-preserved churches and monasteries.

== Administrative and municipal status ==
Within the framework of administrative divisions, Kolomna serves as the administrative center of Kolomensky District, even though it is not a part of it. As an administrative division, it is incorporated separately as Kolomna City Under Oblast Jurisdiction—an administrative unit with the status equal to that of the districts. As a municipal division, Kolomna City Under Oblast Jurisdiction is incorporated as Kolomna Urban Okrug.

== Transportation ==
Kolomna is located on the Ryazan line of the Moscow railroad, 116 kilometers (72 mi) from Moscow. In Kolomna, there are five railway stations (Kolomna, Shchurovo, Bochmanovo, 6 km, and Sychevo) and one terminal (Golutvin).

Two bus terminals are located in the city. Public transport in the city is represented by tram and city bus lines.

Kolomna is situated on three rivers, and has passenger and transport berths, with the most well-known being Bochmanovo berth.

== Sports ==
The Kolomna Speed Skating Center is an indoor ice speed skating oval used for Russian and international championships. It hosted the 2008 European Speed Skating Championships and the 2016 World Single Distance Speed Skating Championships. The Kolomna Speed Skating Center is considered one of the most modern ice speed skating ovals in the world.

== Geography ==
The city is situated at the confluence of the Moskva and Oka Rivers, 114 kilometers (71 mi) (by rail) southeast of Moscow.

=== Climate ===
Climate data for Kolomna (extremes 1913–present)
Month	Jan	Feb	Mar	Apr	May	Jun	Jul	Aug	Sep	Oct	Nov	Dec	Year
Record high °C (°F)	8.3 (46.9)	8.9 (48.0)	19.5 (67.1)	29.8 (85.6)	34.1 (93.4)	35.4 (95.7)	39.5 (103.1)	39.7 (103.5)	30.3 (86.5)	24.3 (75.7)	19.1 (66.4)	10.0 (50.0)	39.7 (103.5)
Mean daily maximum °C (°F)	−4.2 (24.4)	−3.4 (25.9)	2.6 (36.7)	12.0 (53.6)	19.9 (67.8)	23.3 (73.9)	25.6 (78.1)	23.7 (74.7)	17.3 (63.1)	9.5 (49.1)	1.5 (34.7)	−2.7 (27.1)	10.4 (50.8)
Daily mean °C (°F)	−7.1 (19.2)	−6.9 (19.6)	−1.6 (29.1)	6.6 (43.9)	13.9 (57.0)	17.6 (63.7)	19.7 (67.5)	17.7 (63.9)	11.9 (53.4)	5.8 (42.4)	−0.9 (30.4)	−5.0 (23.0)	6.0 (42.8)
Mean daily minimum °C (°F)	−10.2 (13.6)	−10.5 (13.1)	−5.6 (21.9)	1.5 (34.7)	7.7 (45.9)	11.7 (53.1)	14.0 (57.2)	12.1 (53.8)	7.2 (45.0)	2.4 (36.3)	−3.2 (26.2)	−7.7 (18.1)	1.6 (34.9)
Record low °C (°F)	−38.1 (−36.6)	−40.4 (−40.7)	−31.4 (−24.5)	−22.5 (−8.5)	−4.5 (23.9)	−0.7 (30.7)	2.9 (37.2)	0.1 (32.2)	−6.2 (20.8)	−15.1 (4.8)	−26.5 (−15.7)	−40.8 (−41.4)	−40.8 (−41.4)
Average precipitation mm (inches)	41.4 (1.63)	35.4 (1.39)	31.2 (1.23)	36.1 (1.42)	50.1 (1.97)	68.8 (2.71)	69.8 (2.75)	64.5 (2.54)	52.1 (2.05)	55.5 (2.19)	41.1 (1.62)	43.7 (1.72)	589.7 (23.22)
Source: pogoda.ru.net

== Demographics ==
Historical populations of Kolomna (figures in thousands)
Year	1897	1926	1939	1959	1962	1967	1970	1973	1976	1979
Рopulation	20.9	35	85	118	125	131	136	140	145	146.5
Year	1982	1986	1989	1992	1996	1998	2000	2001	2003	2006
Рopulation	151	158	162	163.7	153.6	152.1	150.7	149.6	150.1	148.0

== Notable people ==
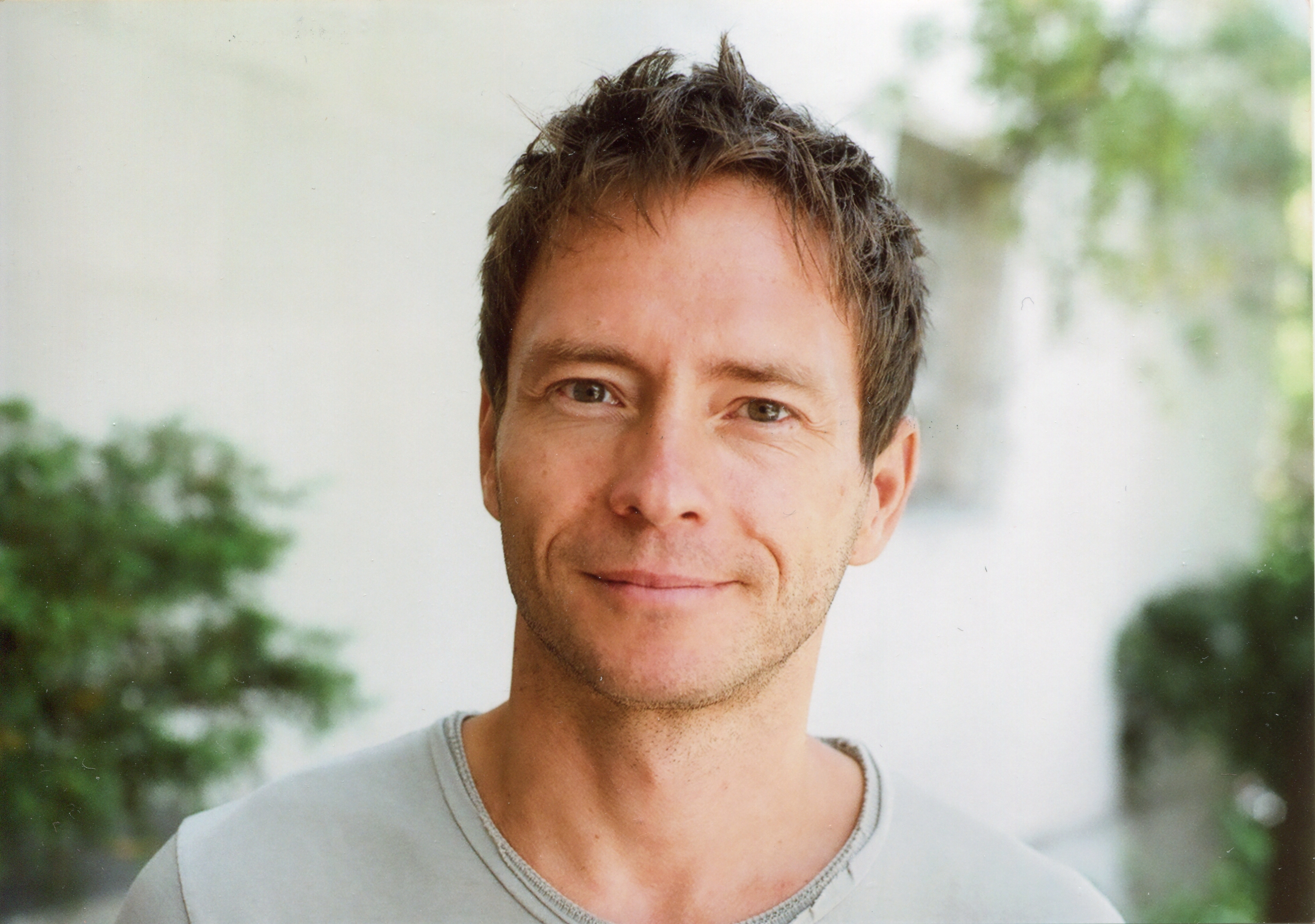
Edward Frenkel

- Vitalik Buterin, Russian-Canadian programmer, writer, and creator of Ethereum
- Dmitry Dorofeyev, speed skater
- Philaret Drozdov, Metropolitan of Moscow
- Nikolay Epshtein, Soviet ice hockey coach
- Edward Frenkel, Russian-American mathematician
- Olga Graf, speed skater
- Sergey Gorshkov, Soviet admiral
- Mikhail Katukov, commander of armored troops in the Red Army
- Ivan Lazhechnikov, writer
- Yekaterina Lobysheva, speed skater
- Sergey Malitsky, fantasy fiction writer
- Eduard Malofeyev, football player and manager
- Mikhail Tyurin, cosmonaut
- Nina Vatolina, poster artist

== Attractions ==
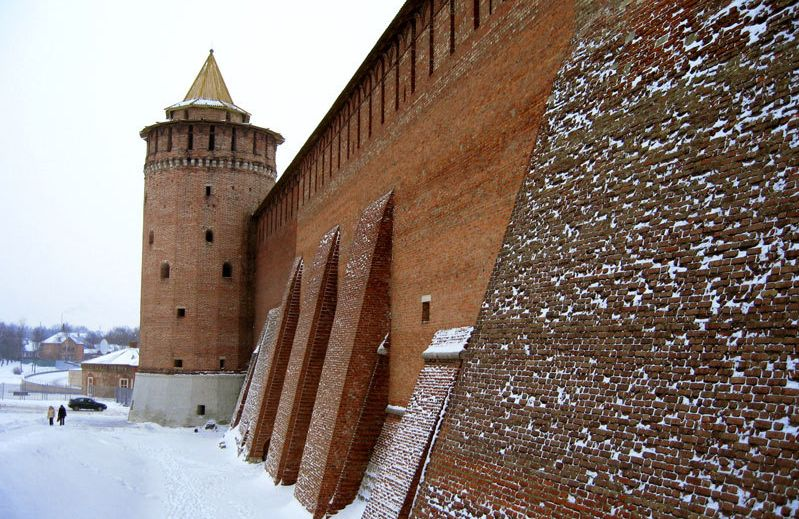
Kolomna Kremlin

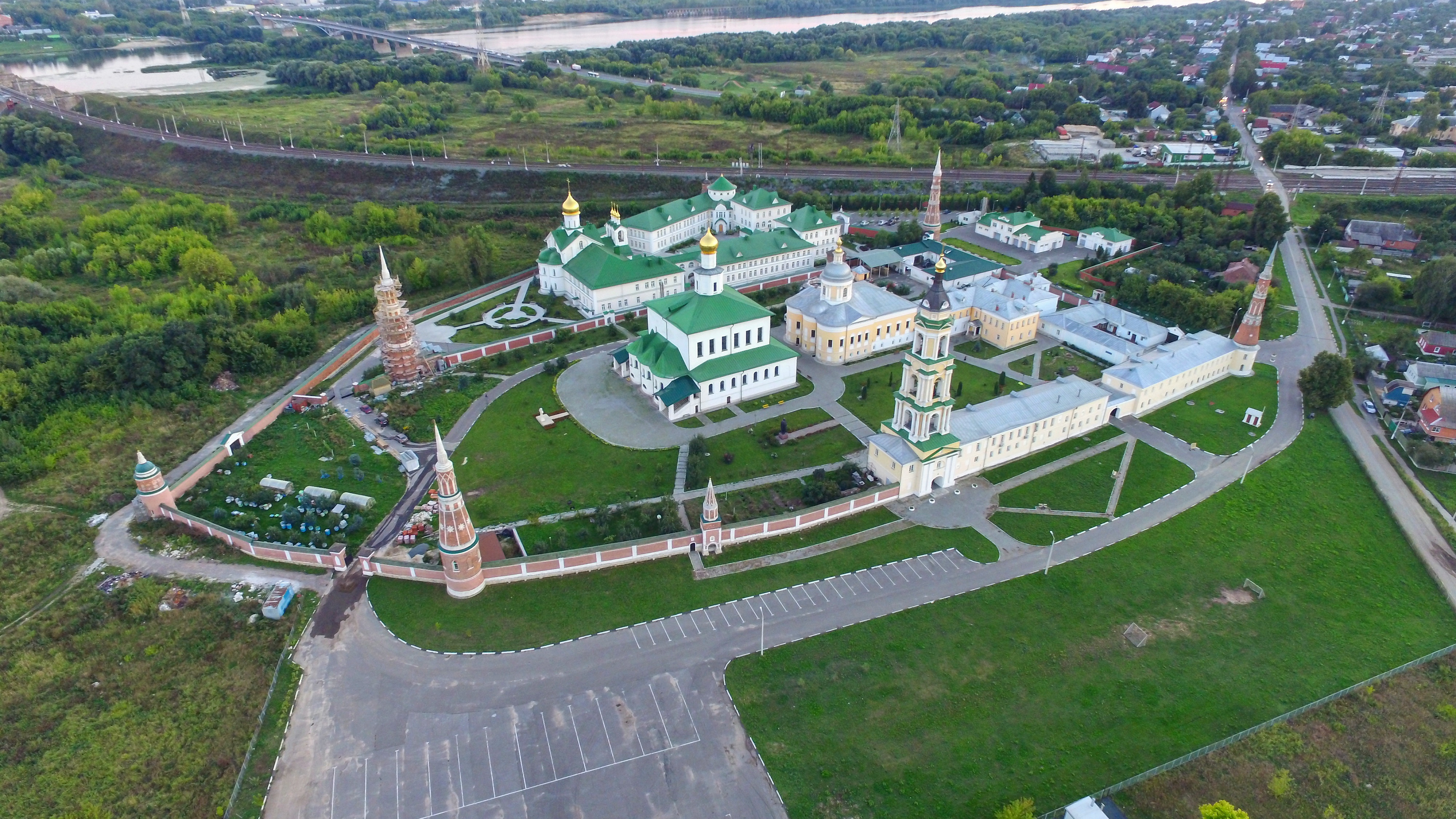
Old Golutvin Monastery

- Kolomna Kremlin including:
  - Kolomna Cathedral
  - New Golutvin Monastery
  - Bobrenev Monastery
- Old Golutvin Monastery near the city, at the confluence of the Moskva and Oka rivers
- Posad, with several parish churches
- Church of John the Baptist, one of the oldest surviving buildings in the Moscow region (datable to the 14th century)
- Museum of pastila, a locally produced fruit candy
- Kolomna Speed Skating Center
- Museum of Organic Culture

== International relations ==
=== Twin towns and sister cities ===
Kolomna is twinned with:

- Maladzyechna, Belarus
- Bauska, Latvia
- Moscow, Russia
- Istočno Sarajevo, Bosnia and Herzegovina
