= Hoity Toity (novel) =

1929 novel by Alexander Belyayev

- The cover of Hoity Toity
- Author: Alexander Belyayev
- Original title: Хойти Тойти
- Translator: Violet L. Dutt
- Language: Russian
- Series: Professor Wagner's Inventions
- Genre: Science fiction
- Publisher: Foreign Languages Publishing House (Moscow)
- Publication date: 1930
- Publication place: Soviet Union
- English publication date: 1961
- Pages: 204 pp

Hoity Toity (Russian: Хойти-Тойти) is a 1929 Soviet science fiction novella written by Alexander Belyayev. The novel, part of the Professor Wagner's Inventions series, was first published in Vsemirny Sledopyt magazine between January and February 1930. It was later included in the 1961 science fiction anthology known as A Visitor from Outer Space.

Hoity Toity, set in the 1920s, describes the adventures of an elephant which has the brain of a young German scientist. It has been translated into Bengali and many other languages.

== Plot ==
The story starts in Berlin, where Bush Circus is attracting unusually large crowds. The centre of the attention is an African elephant known as Hoity Toity which can count and read. However the elephant, angry with its trainer, escapes from the tents and create havoc in the city. Unable to capture the animal, the police decides to kill it. The chaos finally draws a certain Soviet scientist Wagnor, at the mention of whose name the animal calms down.

It is gradually revealed that the elephant possess the brain of a human and was created by Professor Wagnor many years ago. As the elephant returns to the circus with Professor Wagnor, his assistant reads the notes which describes the brain transplantation events in Congo. The brain in the elephant belonged to a young German scientist called Ring, whose heart was destroyed in an accident. Wagnor discovered his live brain and nurtured it in his laboratory. Ring, bored with his life in the lab, later requested Wagnor to give him a body with which he can walk and eat. But the brain was grown oversize and was too large to be in a human skull. It seemed that now only a skull of an elephant can accommodate it.

Wagnor and his assistant Peskov carried the brain to Belgian Congo to conduct the transplantation on a live elephant. After several failed attempts, they finally captured the bull of an elephant herd and conducts the complex surgery. It was successful and they christened the elephant "Sapiens". However, in one night they lose him in the jungle and heart-brokenly return to Moscow.

Ring tells the later part of the story to Professor Wagnor. On that night, he was frightened by a leopard ready to jump on him and ran into the deep forest. Ring lost his way in the jungle and wandered through the harsh basin. He later became part of an elephant herd, was attacked by pygmies, and finally ran into the camp of ivory poachers. Towards the end of the story, all of these hunters kill each other for the ivory and the elephant escapes. He travels to a farm at edge of the jungle and is noted by the children of the farm owner, who calls him "Hoity Toity". Later the Bush Circus Company bought the exceptional animal from the farmer and it became a sensation in the public.

Hoity Toity decided to continue performing in the Bush Circus. Still, only Professor Wagner and his two assistants know the truth behind the "unusual" intelligence of the animal.

=== Wagnor's inventions ===
The story features several unique scientific inventions by Professor Wagnor

- Systems to isolate and maintain a live human brain for long periods
- Devices for communication with isolated human brain
- Transparent "rubber" with which Wagnor makes a suit to walk through African jungles and prepares a trap to capture elephants.
- Elephant "vodka", a powerful intoxication applies on elephants

== Characters ==
- Professor Ring: a young German scientist killed in an accident. His "live" brain was transplanted to an elephant by Professor Wagnor.
- Professor Wagnor: a scientific genius from Moscow, conducts the complex brain transplantation in Congo
- Peskov: former assistant of Professor Wagnor
- Akim Ivanovich Denisov: assistant of Wagnor.
- Cox, Brown and Bakala: greedy European poachers in Belgian Congo. The elephant was captured and used by these ivory hunters.
- Mpepo: native helper to the European poachers
- Ludwig Strom: the manager of the Bush Circus
- Friedrich Jung: the trainer of Hoity Toity in the circus
- Professor Schmidt and Stoltz: scientists trying to learn about Hoity Toity
