= Sergey Malitsky =

Russian writer

- Born: 12 October 1962 (age 63); Irkutskaya oblast, Soviet Union
- Occupation: Author,
- Writing career
- Genre: Fantasy action

Sergey Malitsky (Russian: Сергей Малицкий) is a Russian fantasy fiction writer of Polish descent. He is best known for his fantasy series Arban Saesh, The Code of Semideath, Nothing Personal and Ash of Gods. These are published by the Armada publishing house and by Eksmo.

== Biography ==
In 2000, Malitsky released a collection of short stories entitled It's Easy («Легко»). He later turned from writing short stories to novels; his debut in this form, the novel The Outlander's Mission («Миссия для чужеземца») was released in 2006. Sergey is a prizewinner of two prestigious world literature awards in the Russian-speaking world literature awards: Sword without a Name (Moscow, Russia, 2007, for the novel The Outlander's Mission) and Golden Caduceus (Kharkov, Ukraine, 2007, for the same novel). His short fiction has appeared widely in Russia and Ukraine.

== Video game works ==
Malitsky was the scriptwriter for the fantasy video game Ash of Gods: Redemption for the developer AurumDust.

== Personal life ==
Sergey Malitsky currently resides in the Russian city of Kolomna. He is married and has two children.

== Bibliography ==
=== Arban Saesh series ===
Year	Title	Publisher	ISBN	Note
2006	The Outlander's Mission (Миссия для чужеземца)	Armada publishing house, Moscow	5-93556-755-5	Sword without a Name literature award, Golden Caduceus literature award
2006	Counting the Shadows (Отсчёт теней)	Armada publishing house, Moscow	5-93556-771-7	
2006	A Stone Between the Millstones (Камешек в жерновах)	Armada publishing house, Moscow	5-93556-784-9	

=== The Code of Semideath series ===
Year	Title	Publisher	ISBN	Note
2007	Ant Honey (Муравьиный мёд)	Armada publishing house, Moscow	5-93556-850-0	
2008	A Frame for the Abyss (Оправа для бездны)	Armada publishing house, Moscow	978-5-9922-0220-5	
2009	The Seal of Ice (Печать льда)	Armada publishing house, Moscow	978-5-9922-0375-2	
2010	The Man of Fun (Забавник)	Armada publishing house, Moscow	978-5-9922-0587-9	

=== Nothing Personal series ===
Year	Title	Publisher	ISBN	Note
2010	The Qurantine (Карантин)	Armada publishing house, Moscow	978-5-9922-0691-3	
2010	The Blockade (Блокада)	Armada publishing house, Moscow	978-5-9922-0771-2	

=== Ash of Gods series ===
Year	Title	Publisher	ISBN	Note
2011	The Subversion (Пагуба)	Armada publishing house, Moscow	978-5-9922-0960-0	
2012	The Vale (Юдоль)	Armada publishing house, Moscow	978-5-9922-1210-5	
2012	The Sacrifice (Треба)	Armada publishing house, Moscow	978-5-9922-1330-0	

=== Stones of Mitutu series ===
Year	Title	Publisher	ISBN	Note
2014	The Providence of Evil (Провидение зла)	Eksmo, Moscow	978-5-699-69410-5	
2014	The Taint (Скверна)	Eksmo, Moscow	978-5-699-72307-2	
2014	The Tremble (Трепет)	Eksmo, Moscow	978-5-699-75298-0	
2015	Shadow of the Shining One (Тень Лучезарного)	Eksmo, Moscow	978-5-699-78652-7	

=== Shelter of the Cursed series ===
Year	Title	Publisher	ISBN	Note
2016	The Darkness Silhouette (Очертание тьмы)	Armada, Moscow	978-5-9922-2255-5	
2016	Property of the Fallen (Достояние павших)			

=== Stand-alone novels ===
Year	Title	Publisher	ISBN	Note
2007	The Compression (Компрессия)	Armada, Moscow	978-5-93556-973-0	
2011	The Vacancy (Вакансия)	Armada, Moscow	978-5-9922-0886-3	

=== Novelettes ===
Year	Title	Publisher	ISBN	Note
2000	"The Assholedrome" (Мудодром)	Rio, Moscow	5-89752-031-3	
2012	"Minus" (Минус)	Kolomensky Almanac		
2012	"Every Hunter" (Каждый охотник)	Kolomensky Almanac		

=== Short stories ===
Title	Type	Year of publication
"The Straining Thread"	short story	1999
"The Things"	short story	2002
"The Junkman"	short story	2004
"Suburban Cyperpunk"	short story	2004
"The Rules of Climbing Up the Vertical Wall"	short story	2005
"Love with a Mocker"	short story	2005
"The Genre Classic"	short story	2005
"Palych"	short story	2005; 2009
"The Broken Pencil"	short story	2006
"The Preliminary Shot"	short story	2007
The Job Interview	short story	2008
"The Swede"	short story	2008
"The Complete Inquiry"	short story	2008
"Tea"	short story	2008
"Tanya the Foolish Girl"	short story	2009
"Confidentially"	short story	2009
"The Guest"	short story	2009
"The Dust"	short story	2010
The Glass	short story	2011
Interpretation	short story	2012
"The Truancy"	short story	2012
"The Reconstruction"	short story	2012
"Tales from the Bunker"	short story	2012
