= Professor Dowell's Head =

1925 novel by Alexander Belyaev

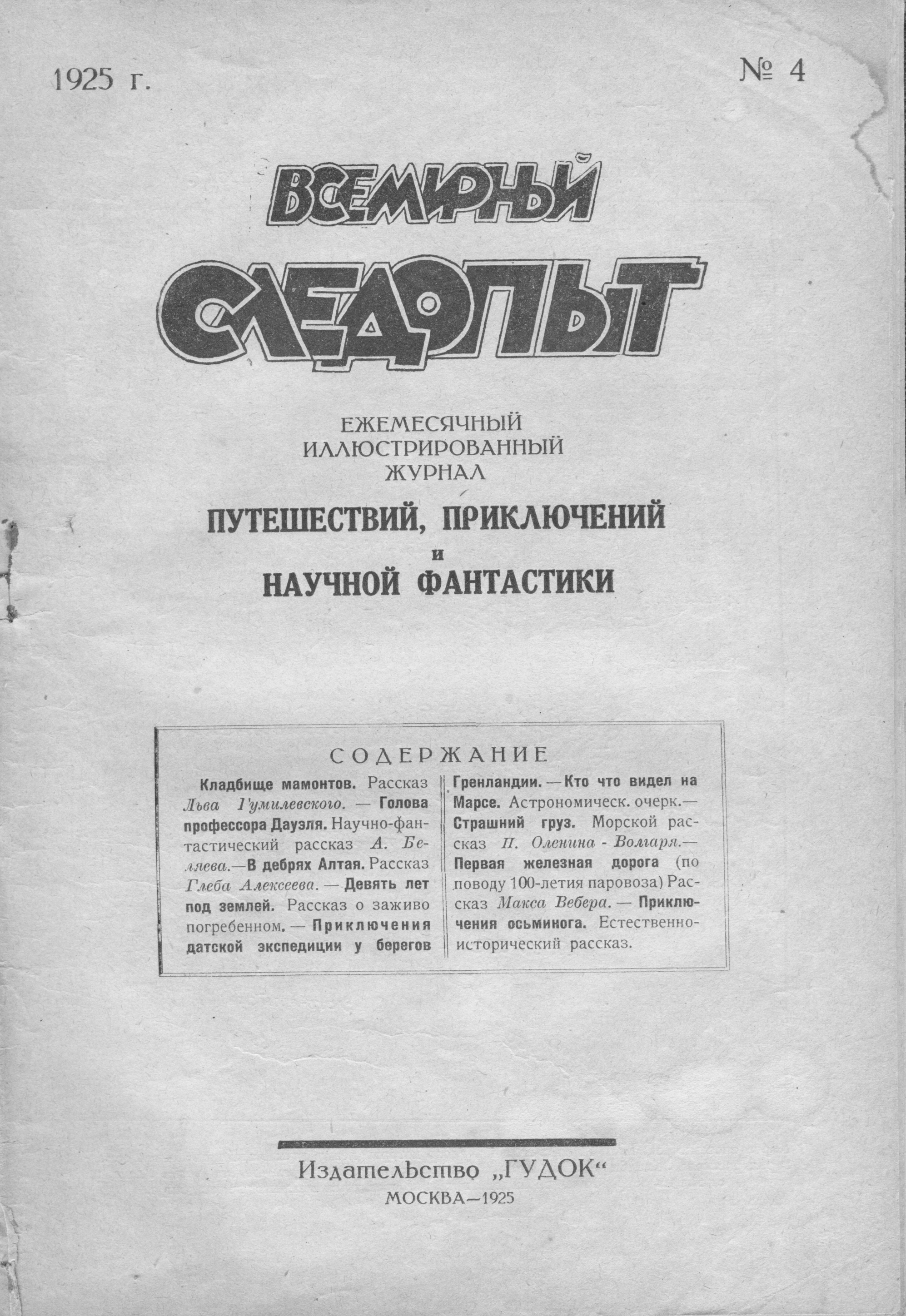
- Edition of The Worker's Gazette containing first instalment of the novel
- Author: Alexander Belyaev
- Original title: Голова профессора Доуэля
- Translator: Antonina W. Bouis; Carl Engel
- Cover artist: Richard M. Powers; Alex Dallman
- Language: Russian
- Genre: Science fiction
- Published: 1925 (Russian) - short story, 1937 (Russian) - novel
- Publisher: Macmillan Publishing; King Tide Press
- Publication place: Soviet Union
- English publication date: 1980, 2021
- Media type: Print
- Pages: 157, 208
- ISBN: 979-8-9851497-0-8
- OCLC: 5831451
- Followed by: The Lord of the World

Professor Dowell's Head (Russian: Голова профессора Доуэля) is a 1925 science fiction and horror story (and later novel) by Russian author Alexander Belyaev. The story follows the work of a doctor who has secretly revived his old boss's head, who now guides him through new experiments.

== Plot ==
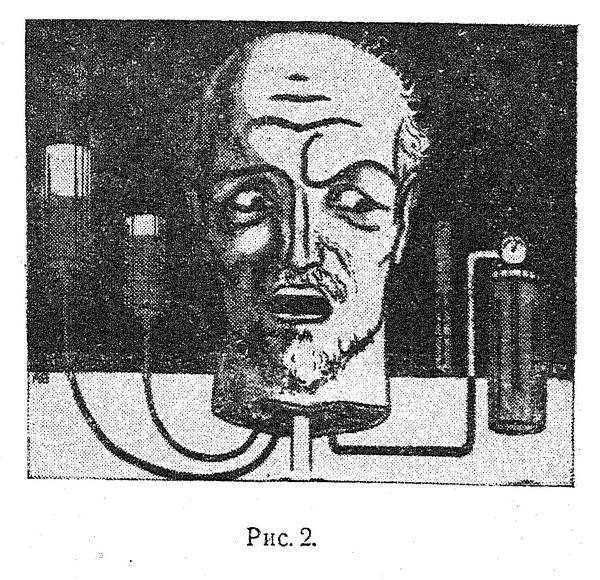
An illustration from a 1939 edition of the novel

Professor Dowell and his assistant surgeon Dr. Kern are working on medical problems including life support in separated body parts. Dr. Kern kills Dowell. Professor Dowell's head is now kept alive and used by Dr. Kern for extraction of scientific secrets; however, his new assistant, the medically trained Marie Loren, discovers the ploy and is dismayed; to keep her from exposing him, Kern eventually gets her imprisoned in a false lunatic asylum for undesirables.

Continuing his experiments, Dr. Kern transplants the head of a young woman to a new body. That body belongs to the girlfriend of a friend of Dowell's son, who recognizes her body when the young woman flees Dr. Kern's laboratory. Together, Dowell's son and his friend free Marie Loren. Dr. Kern is anxious to announce himself as the inventor. But Dowell's son and Marie Loren help his father's head get in front of the cameras and reveal the truth. The head of professor Dowell tells all before dying. Dr. Kern, disgraced, is summarily executed by a police detective.

== Background ==
The story was initially published in The Worker’s Gazette, a Moscow daily publication, between 16 June and 6 July 1925.

== Legacy and reception ==
The book was positively reviewed in the Library Journal in 1980, with the reviewer describing it as "an extraordinary tale" and comparing it to Frankenstein and the works of Kafka. David Kirby complimented Antonina W. Bouis's translation as "fluid" and praised the novel as "lively and readable". He interpreted the novel as an allegory for the Soviet revolution, with Dowell being comparable to its leaders, who could not predict "the horrible ends to which his activities would lead". Los Angeles Times commentator Nick B. Williams said Belyaev continued the "Poe-esque" tradition into "the realm of modern pseudo-science" commenting, "if squeamish, skip it. If not, read and revel."

Less than three months after the story was released, similar experiments were performed by surgeon Sergei Brukhonenko. In the Soviet press, Brukhonenko's experiments were often compared to the story.

The novel was adapted into several films.

- The novel was very loosely adapted to film under the title Professor Dowell's Testament (1984) by director Leonid Menaker. The film only used the basic premise of the novel and made numerous changes to the characters and story.
- The Head in the House (Chinese: 凶宅美人头), a Chinese film adaptation, was made by the Xi'an Film Studio in 1989.

== English translations ==
- Beliaev, Alexander (1980). Professor Dowell's Head. Best of Soviet SF. Translated by Bouis, Antonia W. (1. print ed.). New York: Macmillan Publishing. ISBN 978-0-02-508370-7.
- Belyaev, Alexander (3 November 2021). Professor Dowell's Head. Translated by Engel, Carl. Philadelphia: King Tide Press. ISBN 979-8-9851497-0-8.
