= Semyon Bobrov =

Russian poet and civil servant

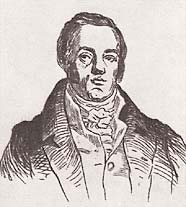
- Semyon Sergeyevich Bobrov
- Born: Semyon Bobrov; 1763; Yaroslavl, Russian Empire
- Died: 3.4.1810; Saint Petersburg, Russian Empire
- Education: Imperial Moscow University (1785)
- Occupations: Poet, literary theorist, civil servant
- Writing career
- Language: Russian

Semyon Sergeyevich Bobrov (1763/1765, Yaroslavl - 22 March (3 April) 1810, Saint Petersburg) — was a Russian poet and civil servant.

== Life ==
Bobrov's father was a church minister. At the age of nine Bobrov entered a religious seminary at Moscow. In 1780 he enrolled in the secondary school attached to Moscow University from which he graduated in 1785. His first published writing appeared in 1784.

After graduation from the university he moved to St. Petersburg. In 1787 he was hired by the Heraldry department of the Governing Senate. He worked as a translator at the Admiralty Board and at the committee on legislature. Beginning in 1792 he served in the admiralty office of the Black Sea Fleet under admiral Nikolay Mordvinov. He spent about ten years in southern Russia.

In the early 1800s Bobrov published in magazines associated with the Free Society of Lovers of Literature, Science, and the Arts: "Northern Herold", "Lyceum", and "Flowergarden" (Russian: «Северный вестник», «Лицей», «Цветник»), and in 1807 officially became associated with the Society. 1805 he took part in the language controversy on the side of the "archaists" with his work "Events in the shadow-land, or the fate of the Russian language" (Russian: «Происшествие в царстве теней, или Судьбина российского языка»), which of course provoked negative reactions from the "karamzinists", by whom he was denounced as a "bibris" (from Latin bibere - to drink). Through the responses to his ideas by P.A. Vyazemsky, K.N. Batyushkov and Pushkin, who called him "the heavy bibrus", Bobrov's name was saved from complete oblivion.

Toward the end of his life, Bobrov developed a drinking habit and lived in poverty. He died from tuberculosis in St. Petersburg and was buried at the Volkovo Cemetery.

== Literary activity ==
Bobrov wrote dense, heavy material, as witnessed by the titles of his huge books, e.g. "The Coming of Midnight, or Contemplation of the Fame, Deeds and Wisdom of the Crowned (literally "Porphyrebearing"), Military and Civil Geniuses of Russia, Followed by Accounts of Didactic, Erotic or Various Other Natures in Verse and Prose" (Russian: «Рассвет полночи, или Созерцание славы, торжества и мудрости порфироносных, браненосных и мирных гениев России, с исследованием дидактических, эротических и других разного рода в стихах и прозе опытов»). In addition to long poems such as "Taurica, or My Summer Day at the Taurian Chersonesus“ (Russian: «Таврида, или Мой летний день в Таврическом Херсонесе»), the already mentioned "Coming of Midnight", and "The Old Night of the Universe, or the Fartravelling Blind“ (Russian: «Древняя ночь вселенной, или Странствующий слепец»), Bobrov wrote and translated odes as well as works of moral instruction. He was one of the first in Russia to take an interest in English literature. He was a mystic, but his mysticism was a clear and human one; his mystic feeling fed on literature and awoke in him a predilection for symbolism which often led him to (occasionally extreme) exaggeration.

Bobrov's poetic prowess was taken note of by many of his contemporaries. Derzhavin, especially, "was in raptures" about his works, Krylov wrote in 1822 on the "wilful and unbridled" within "Bobrov’s genius", Küchelbecker spoke of the "greatness" of his talent, and Griboyedov sharpened his own artistic mastership by reading and rereading the famous "Taurica".

However, beside such praise, he also met with the opposite: long before Vyazemsky, Batyushkov and Pushkin, Radishchev mentioned him with derision in his poem "Bova". His contemporaries simply could not find value in Bobrov the literary theorist with strong and even farreaching views. In his time Bobrov felt the full harshness of the struggle between the perception of thought and its adequate expression in language. "Speech is light, but how delusive! Reaching us through our ears it often loses its rightful sense." He boldly coined neologisms, declaring that "Usual and worn-out expressions, it seems, might not give to the word such strength as fresh, bold expressions invented with patriotic endeavour." Many new words were coined by him, most of them clumsily complicated and in bad taste; some, however, entered into colloquial and literary speech. Most often he used slavianisms (neologisms derived from Slavic languages), which brought him the sympathies of Shishkov, but made him the laughing stock of the karamzinists. He upheld that "rhyme should never hold up the musical qualities of a poem... [it] often serves as a deflection of the most beautiful feelings and the most refined thoughts, but almost always destroys the very soul of the work", if the author makes the slightest concession to it. Long before Benediktov, Balmont and the symbolists of the end of the 19th century, Bobrov felt the yearning for the "awful sound" and the "unknown speech" and was among the first to uphold the beauty of blank verse.

== Bibliography ==
- Imperial Moscow University: 1755-1917: encyclopedic dictionary. Moscow: Russian political encyclopedia (ROSSPEN). 2010. pp. 79–80. ISBN 978-5-8243-1429-8 – via A. Andreev, D. Tsygankov.
