= List of Russian-language writers =

Russian-language writers
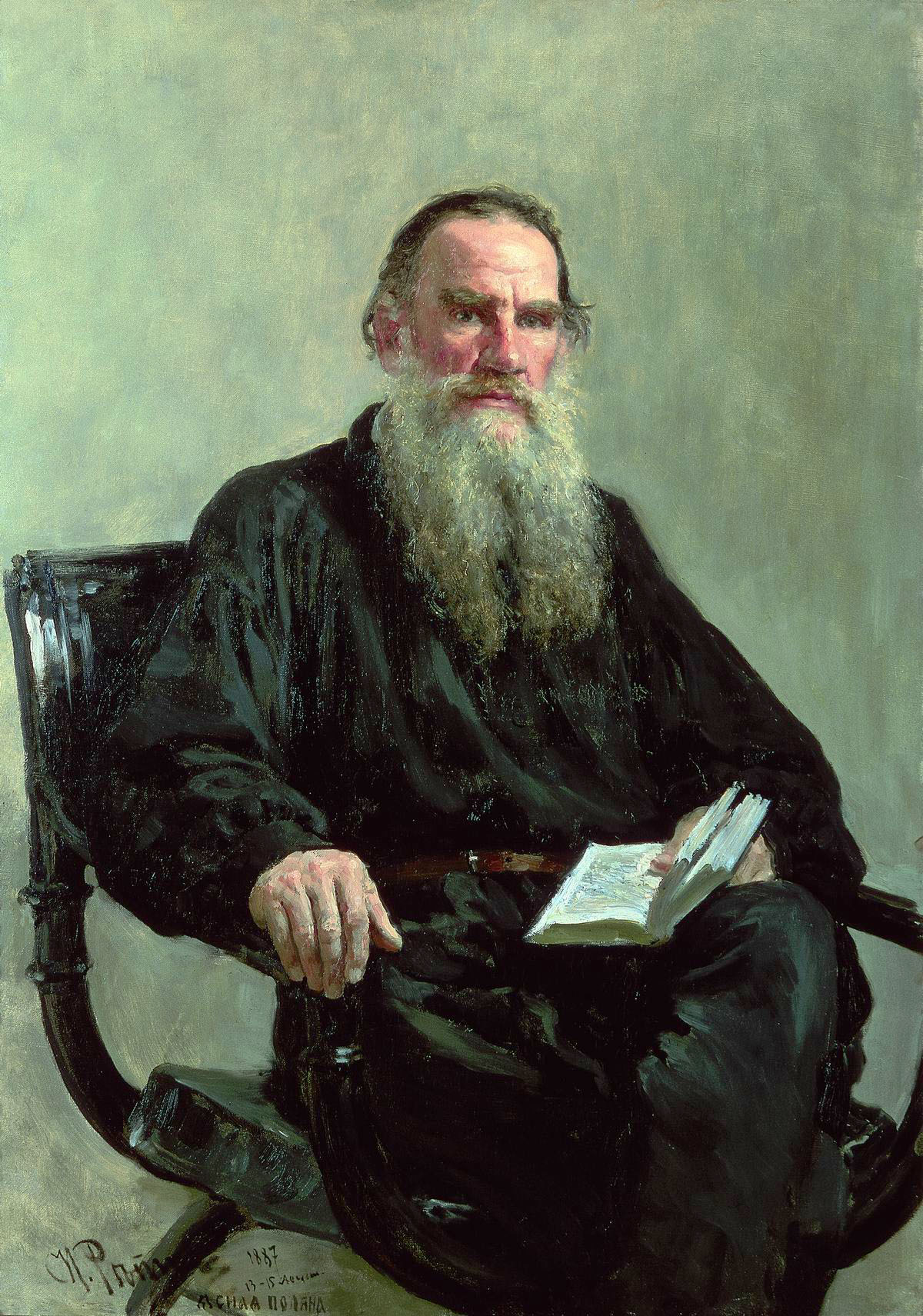

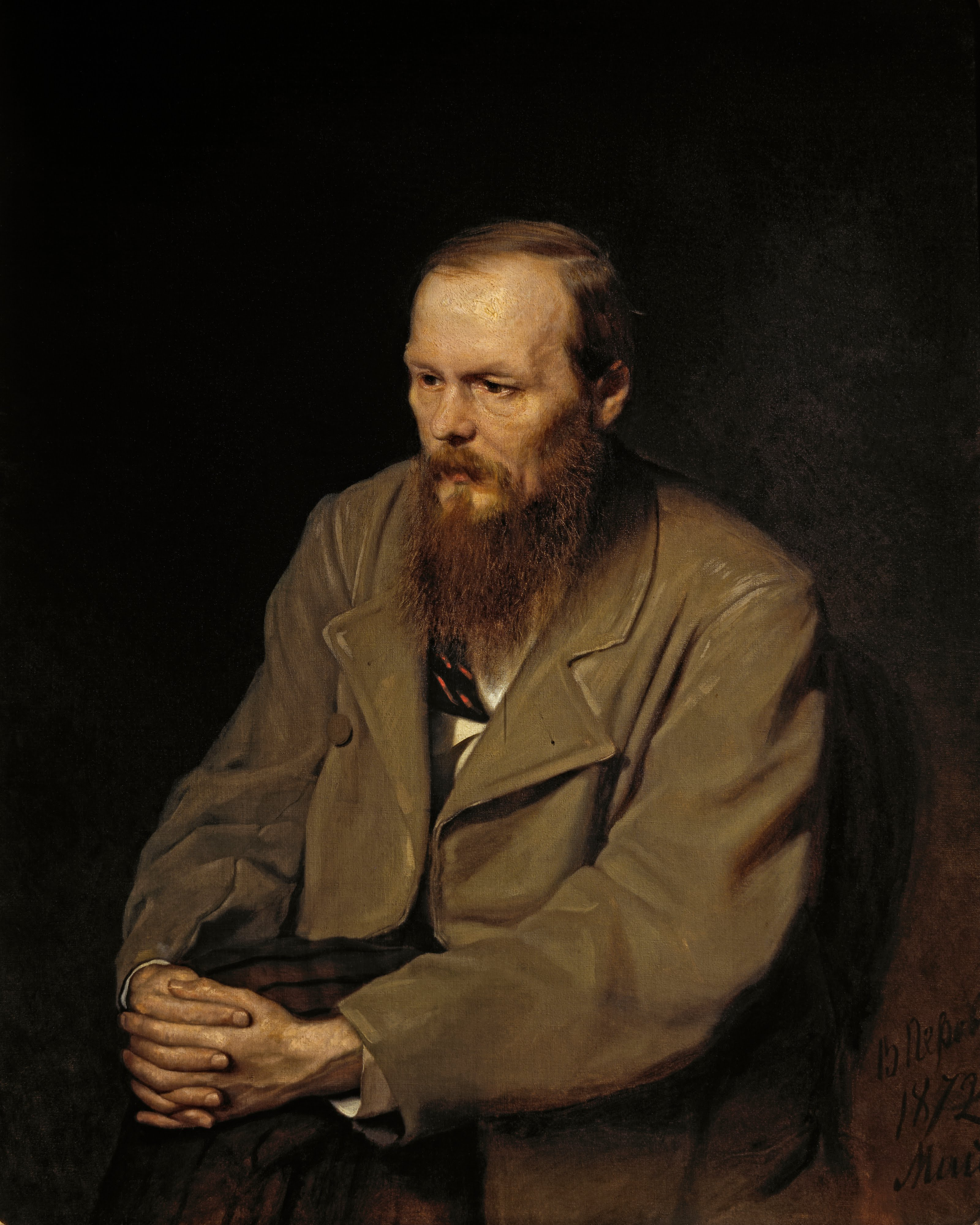

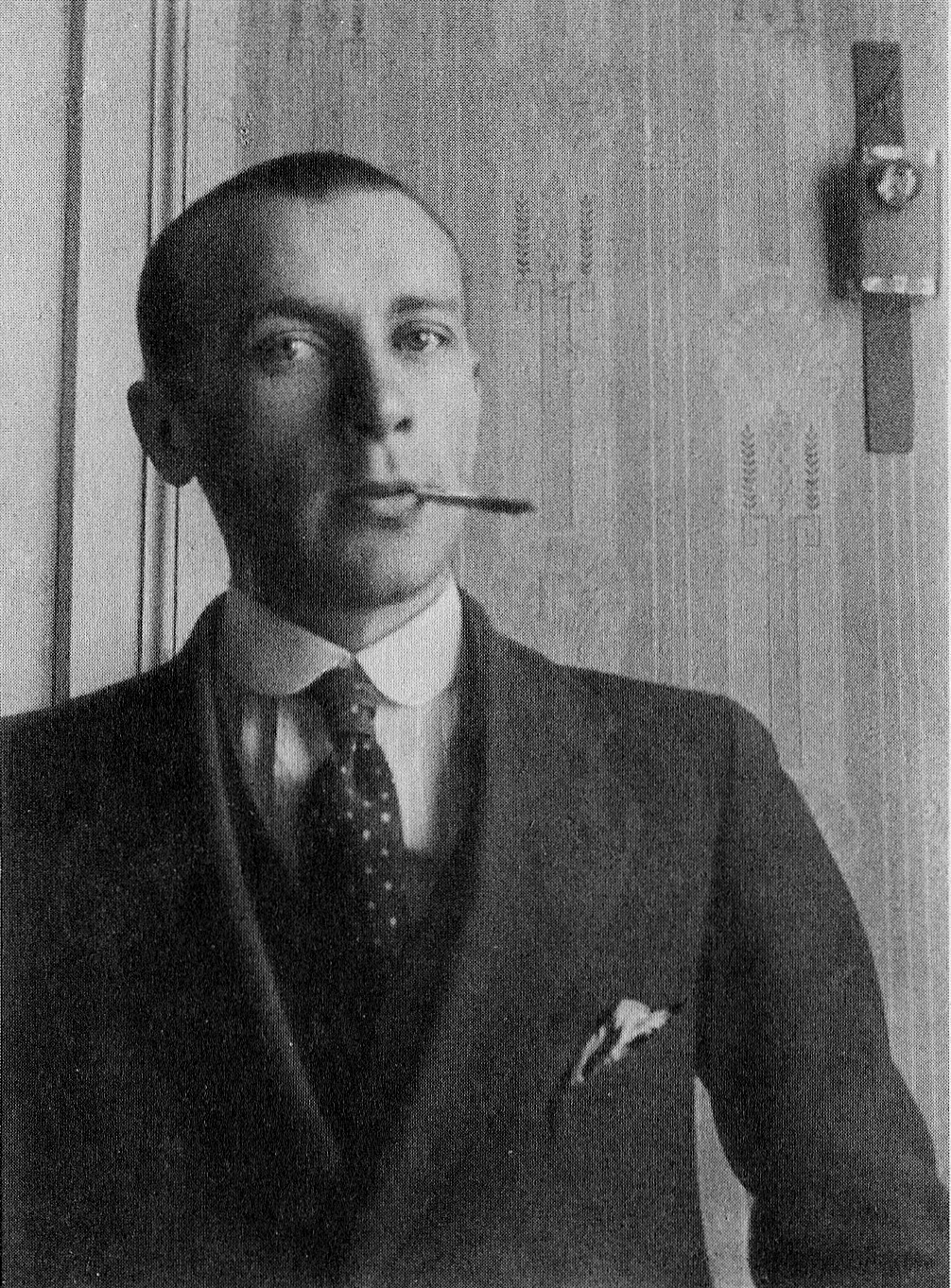

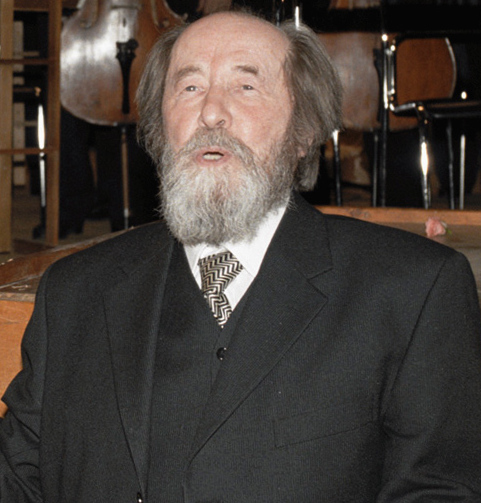

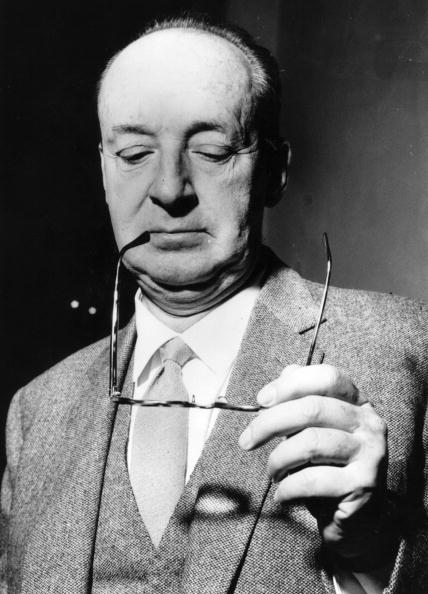

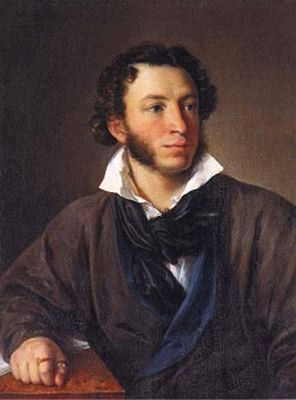

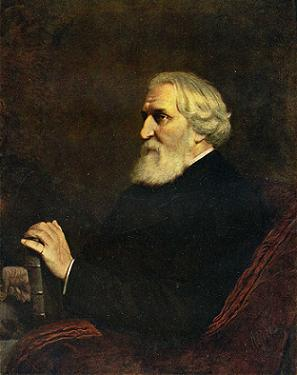

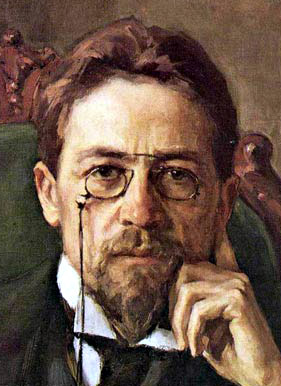

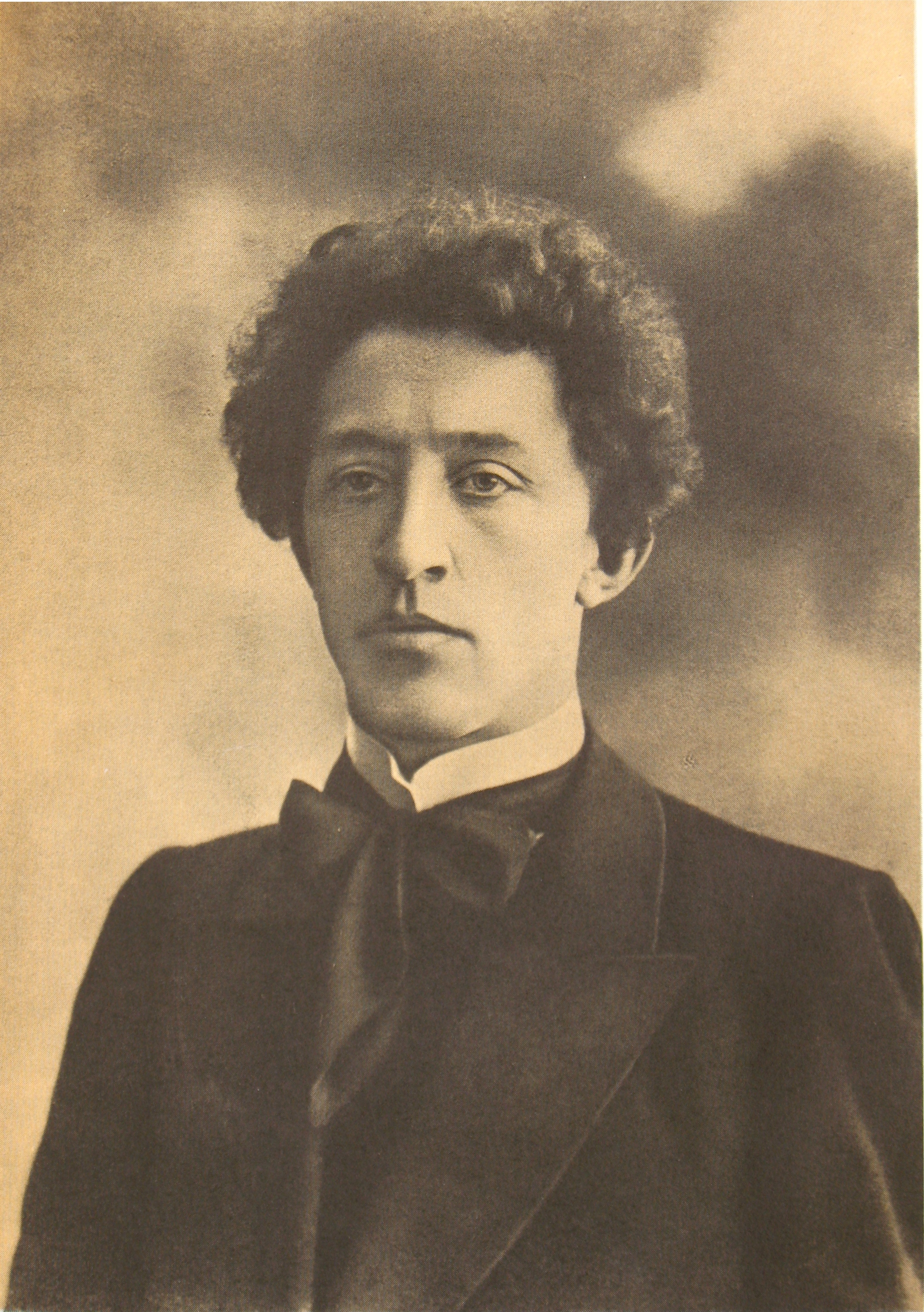

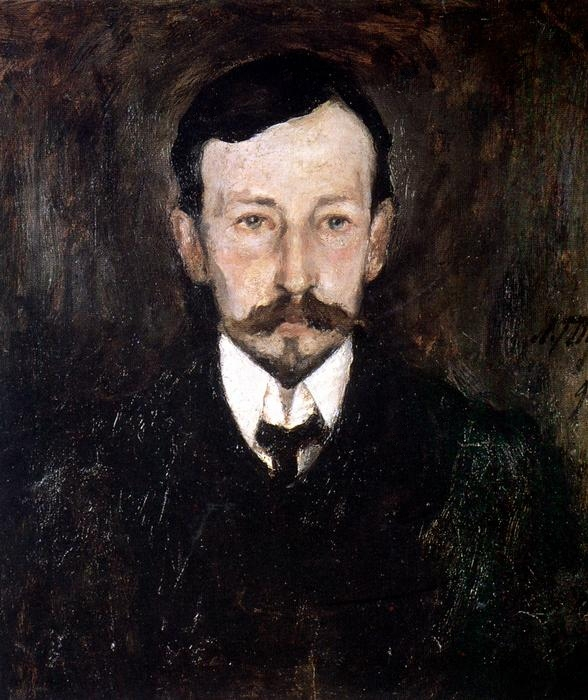

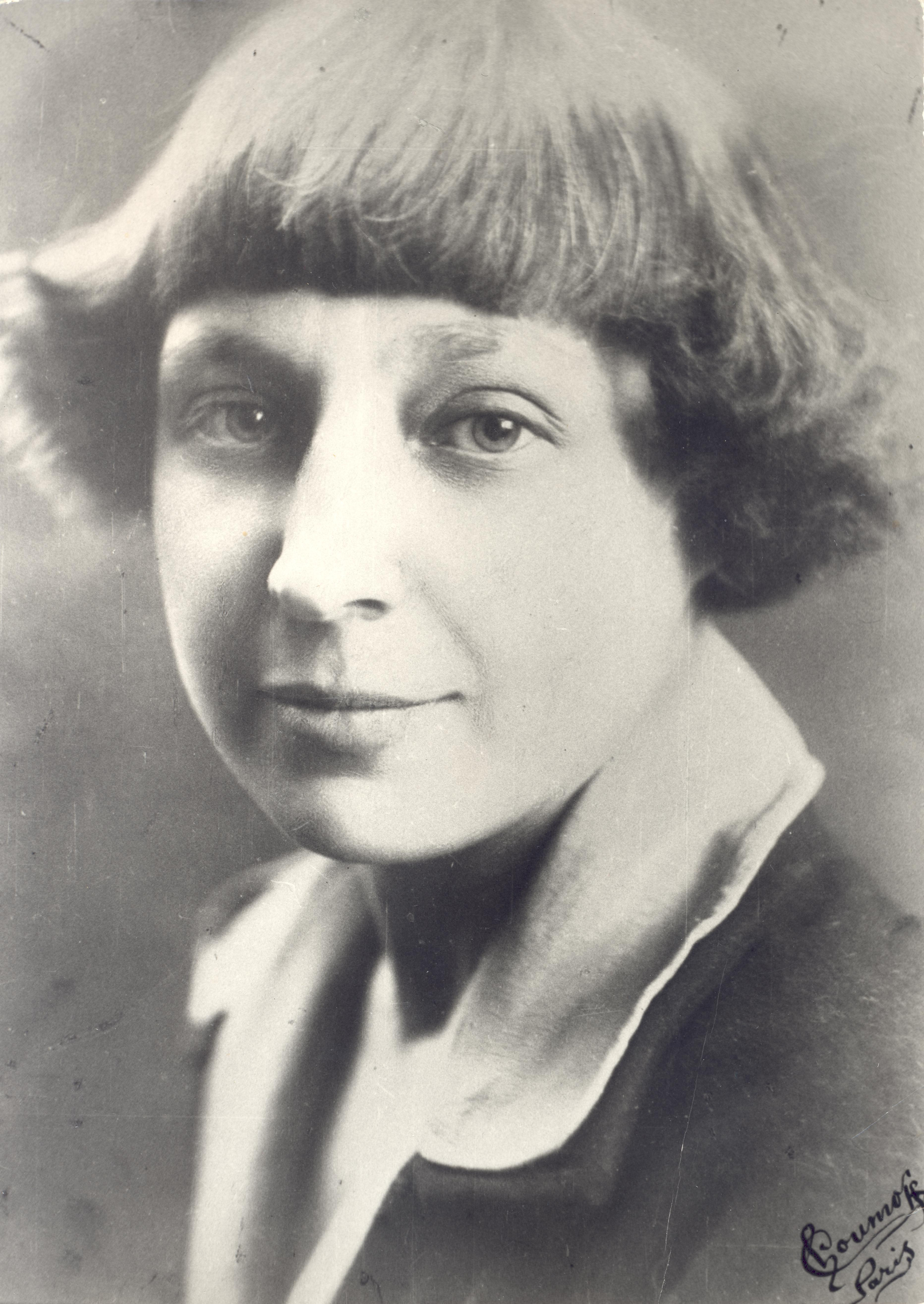

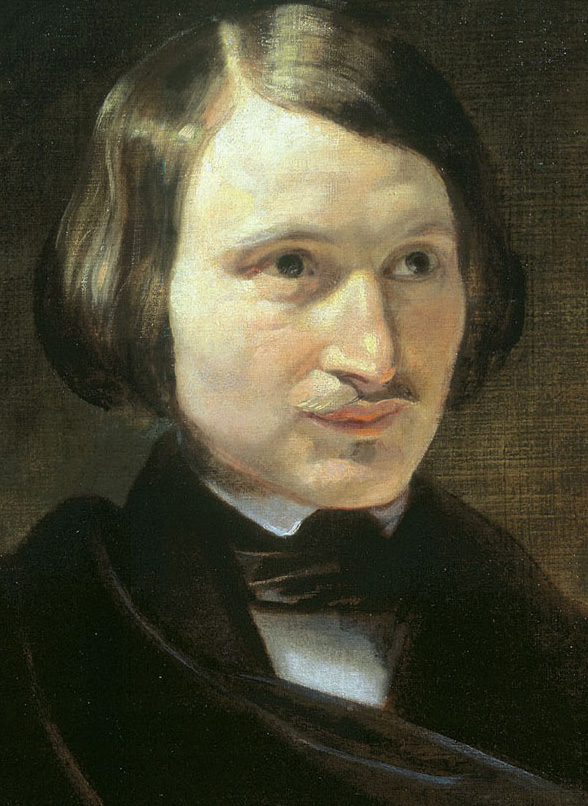

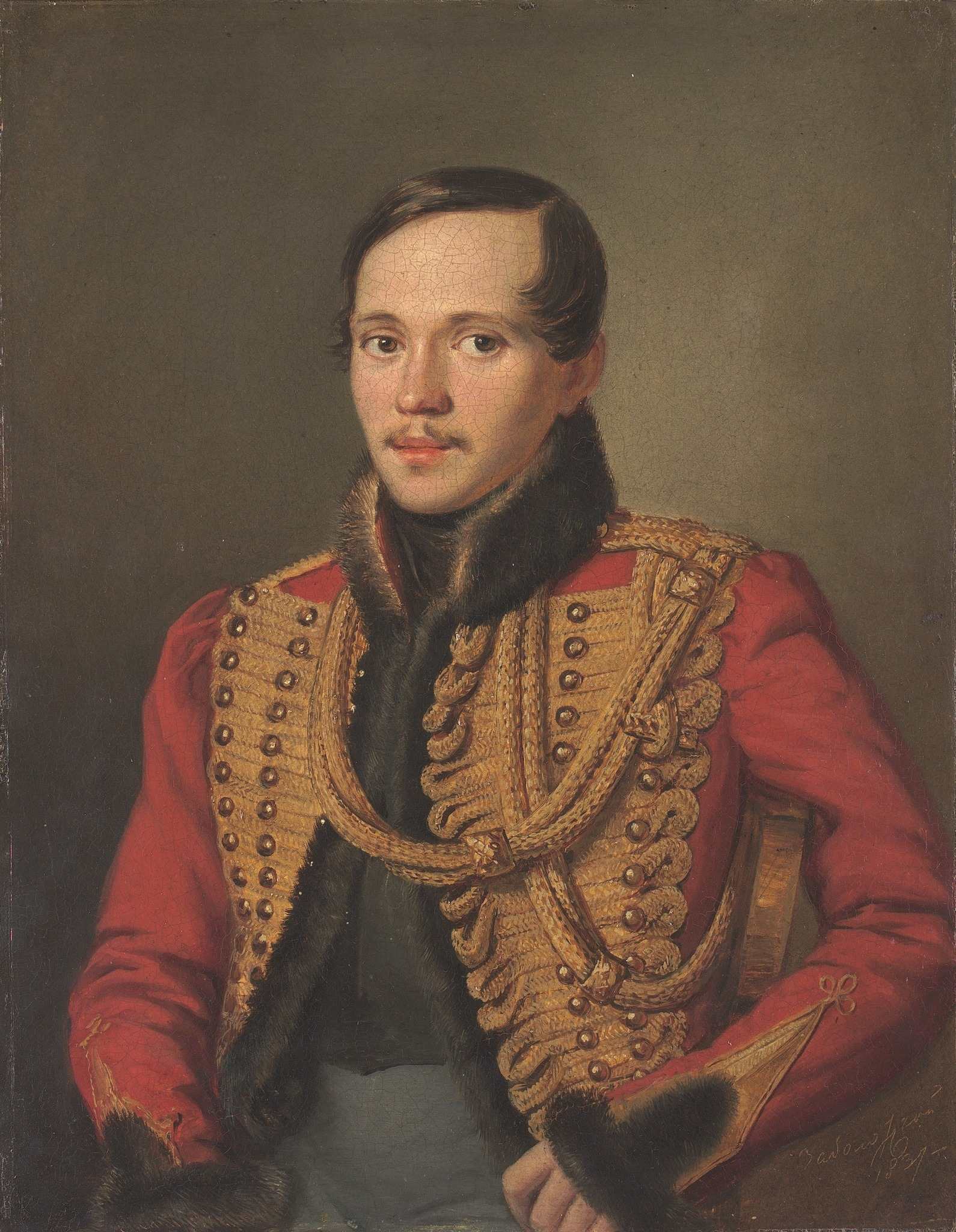

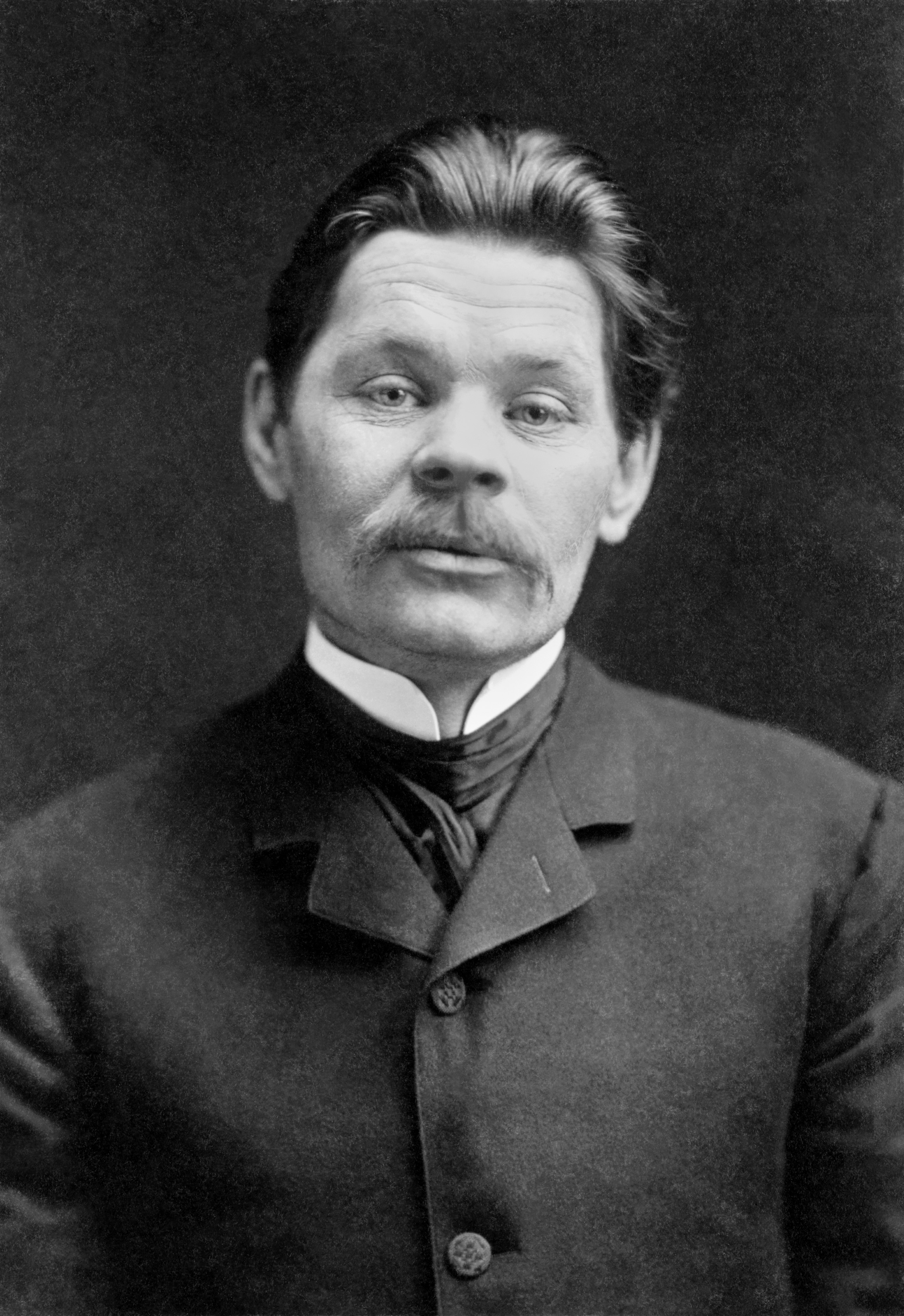

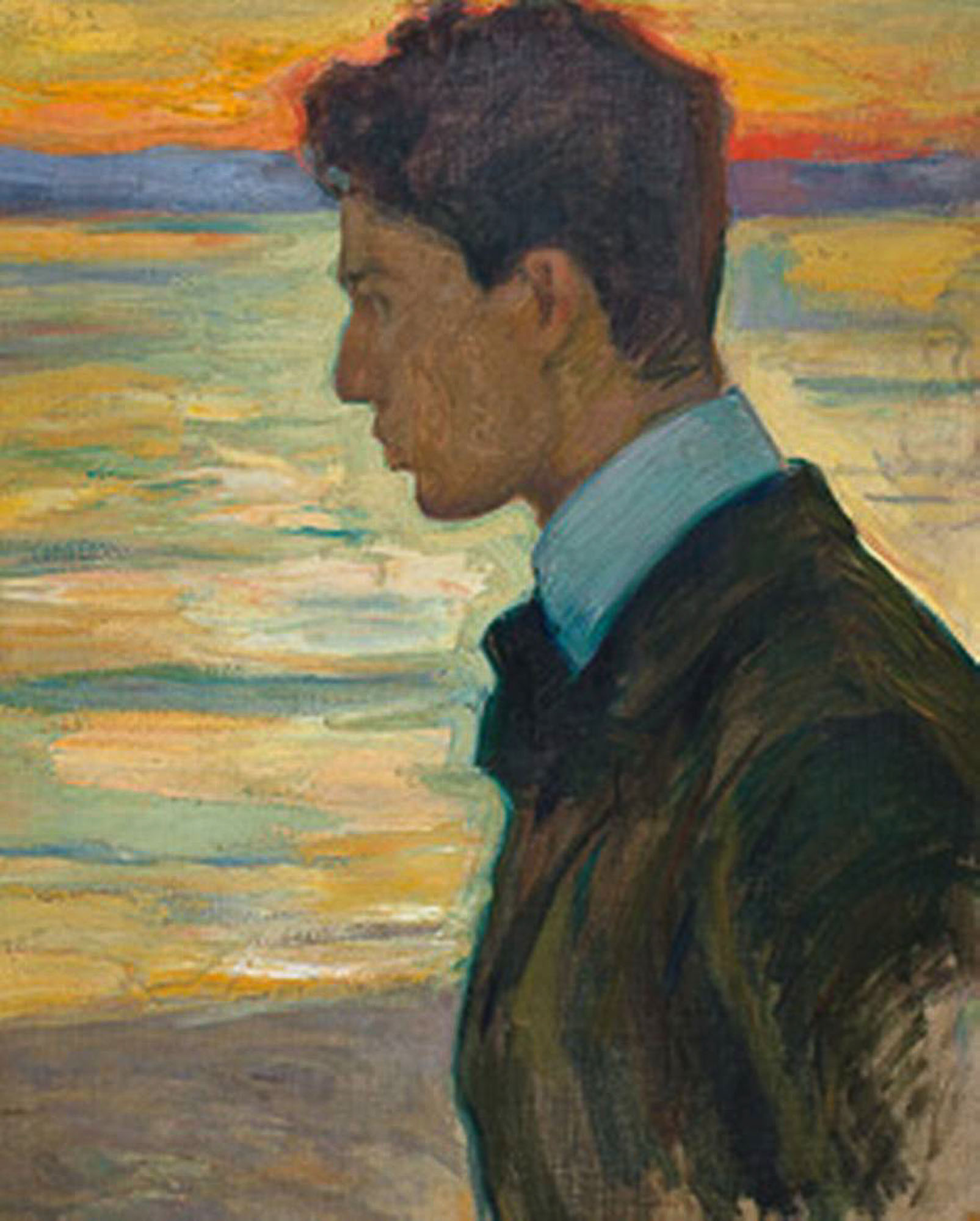

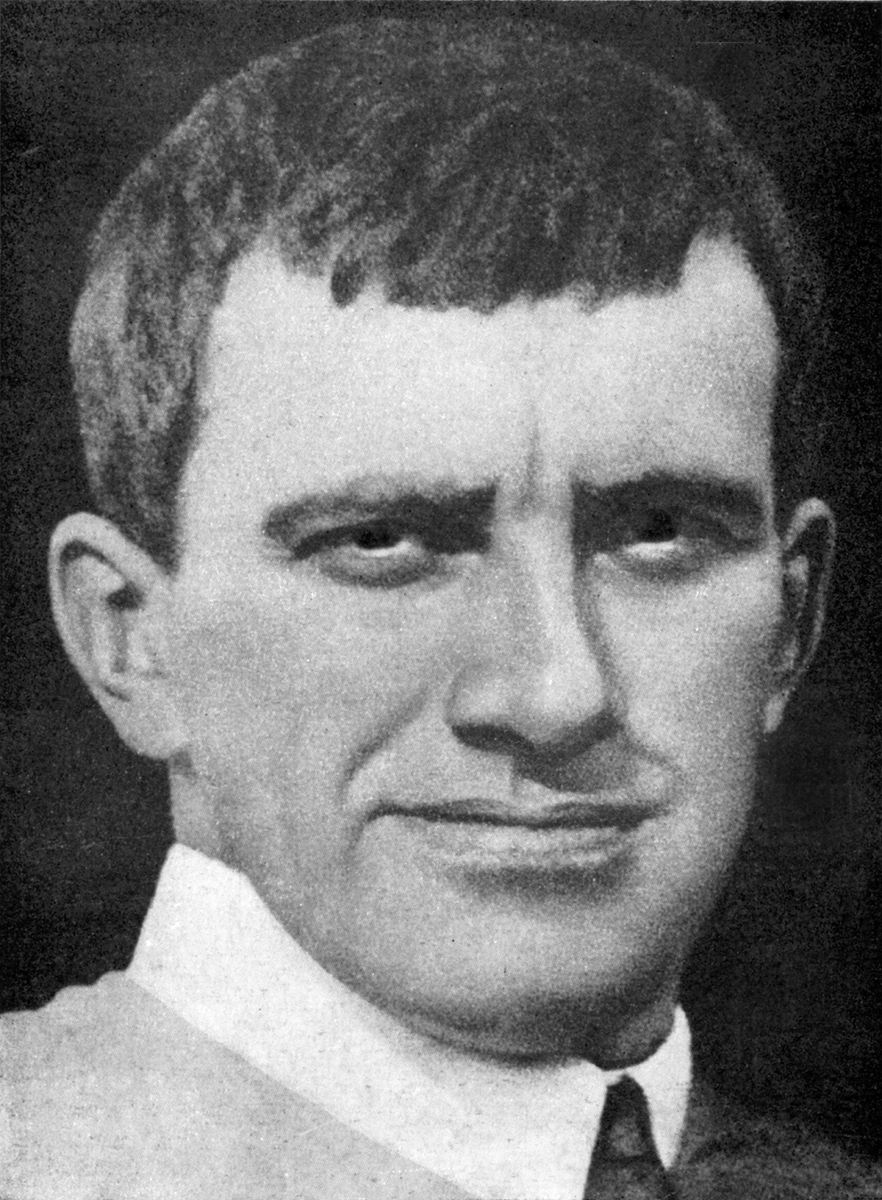

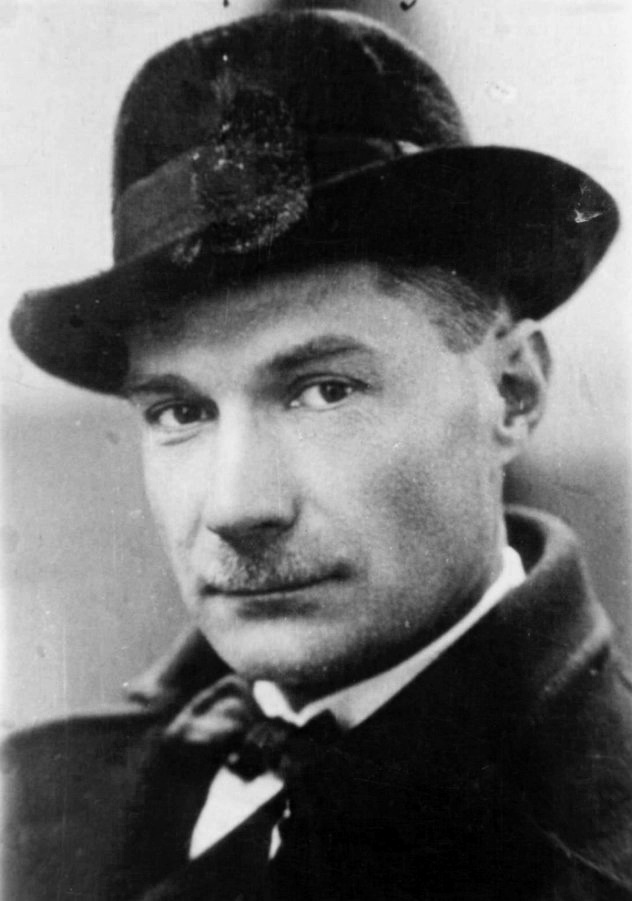

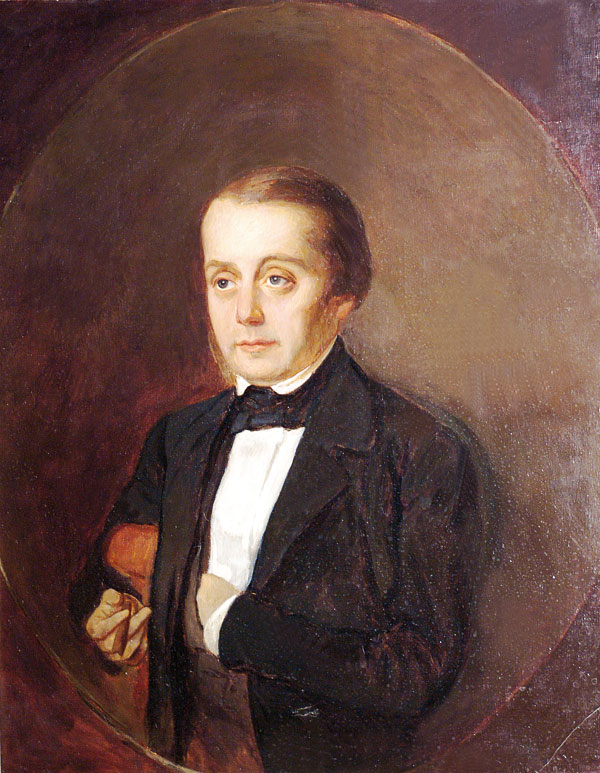

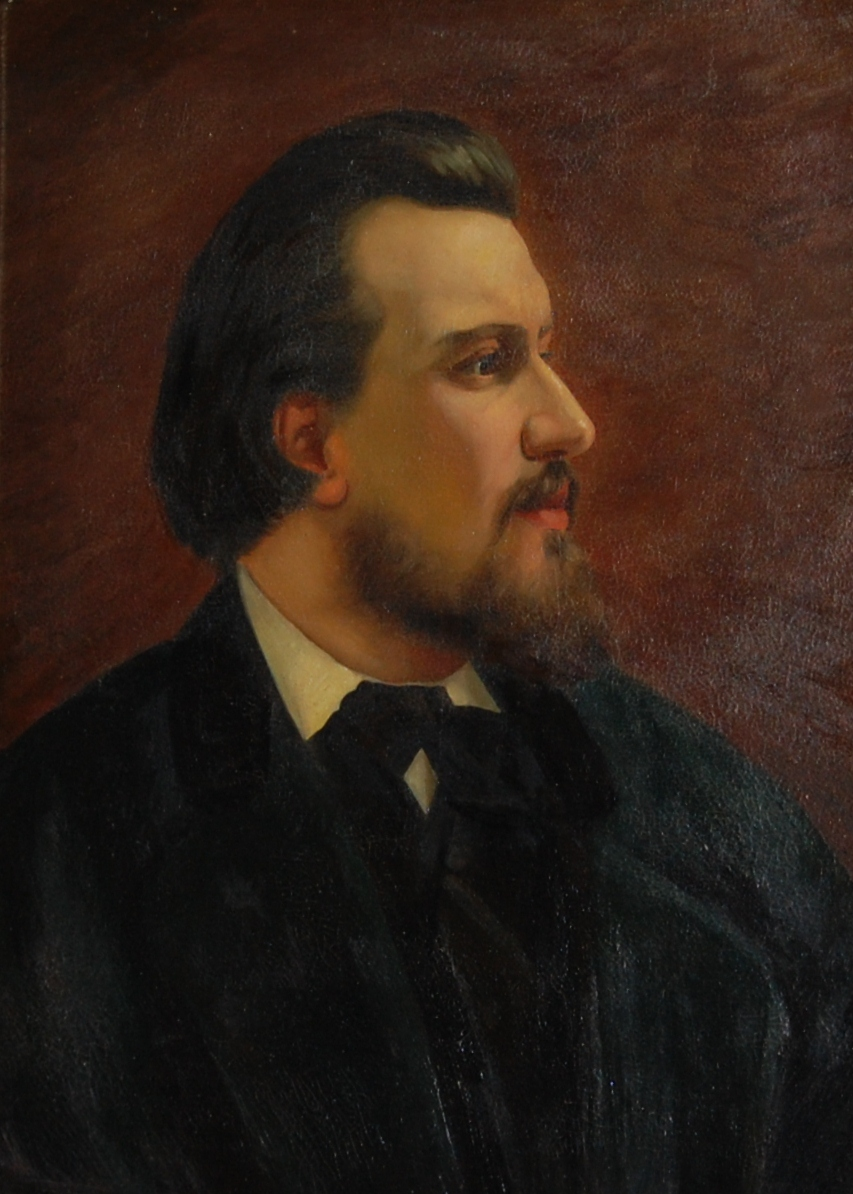

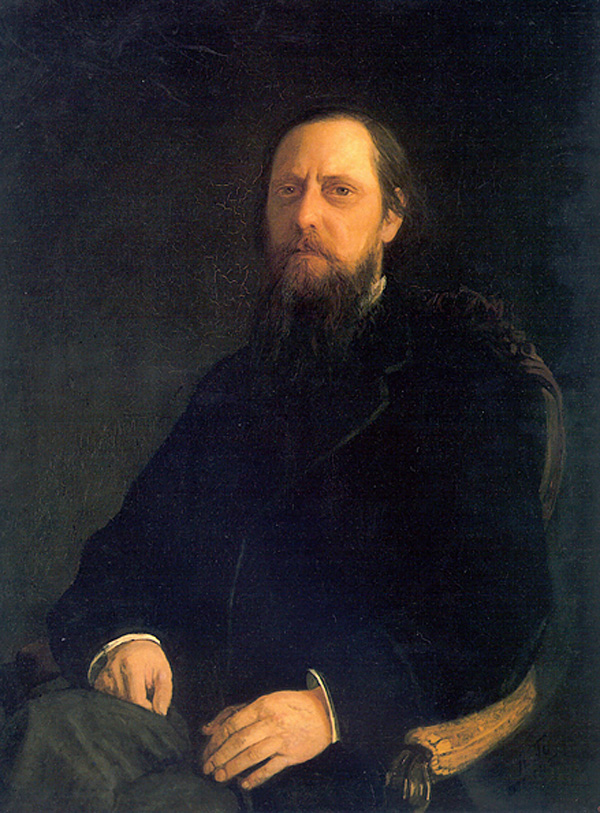

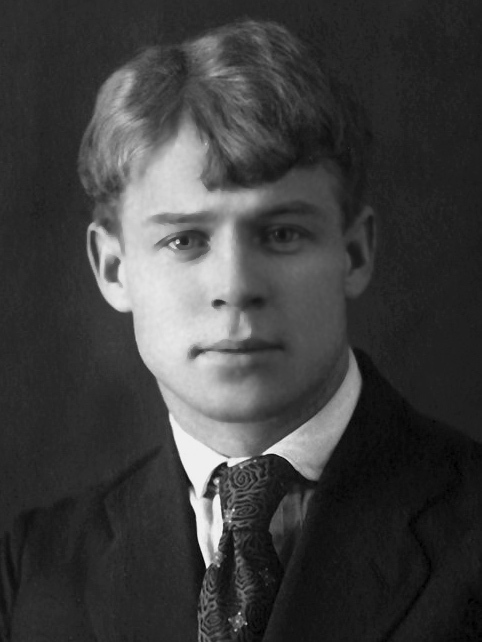

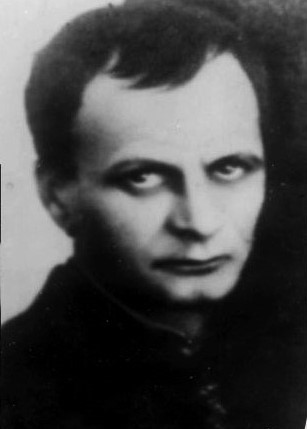

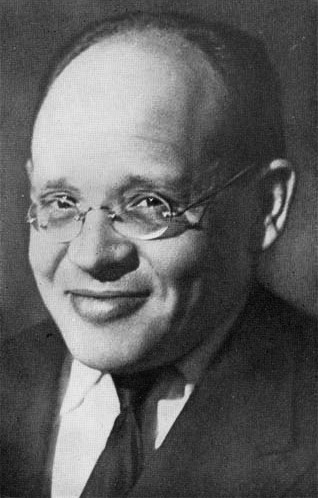

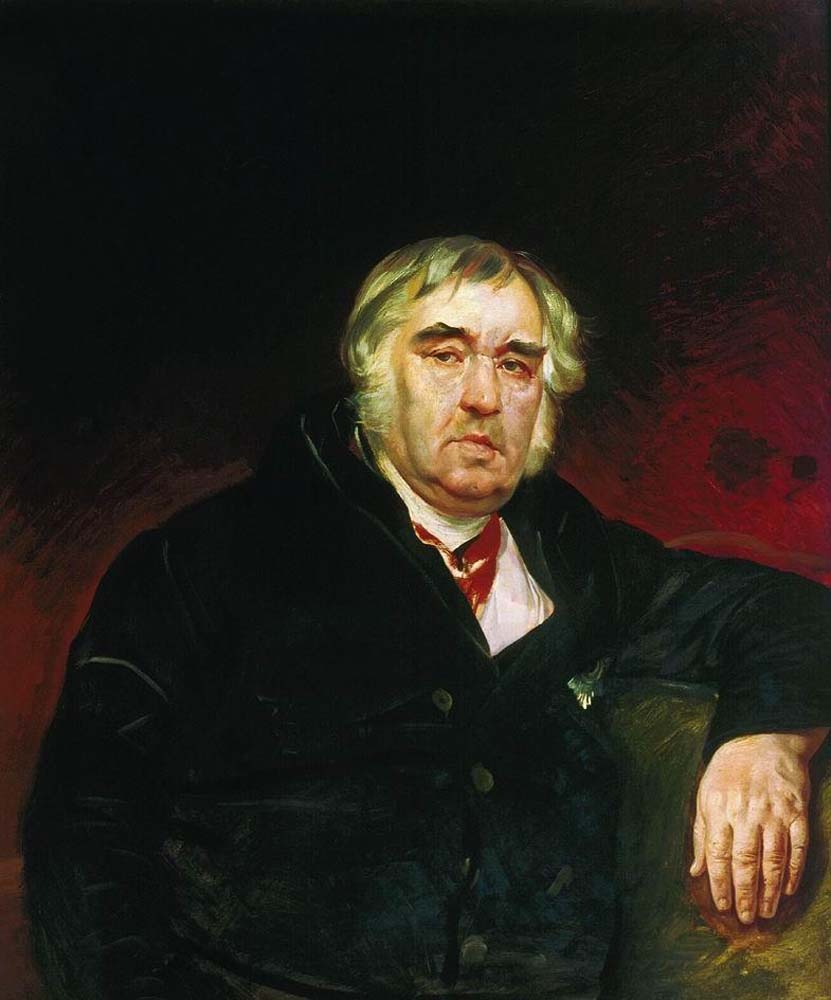

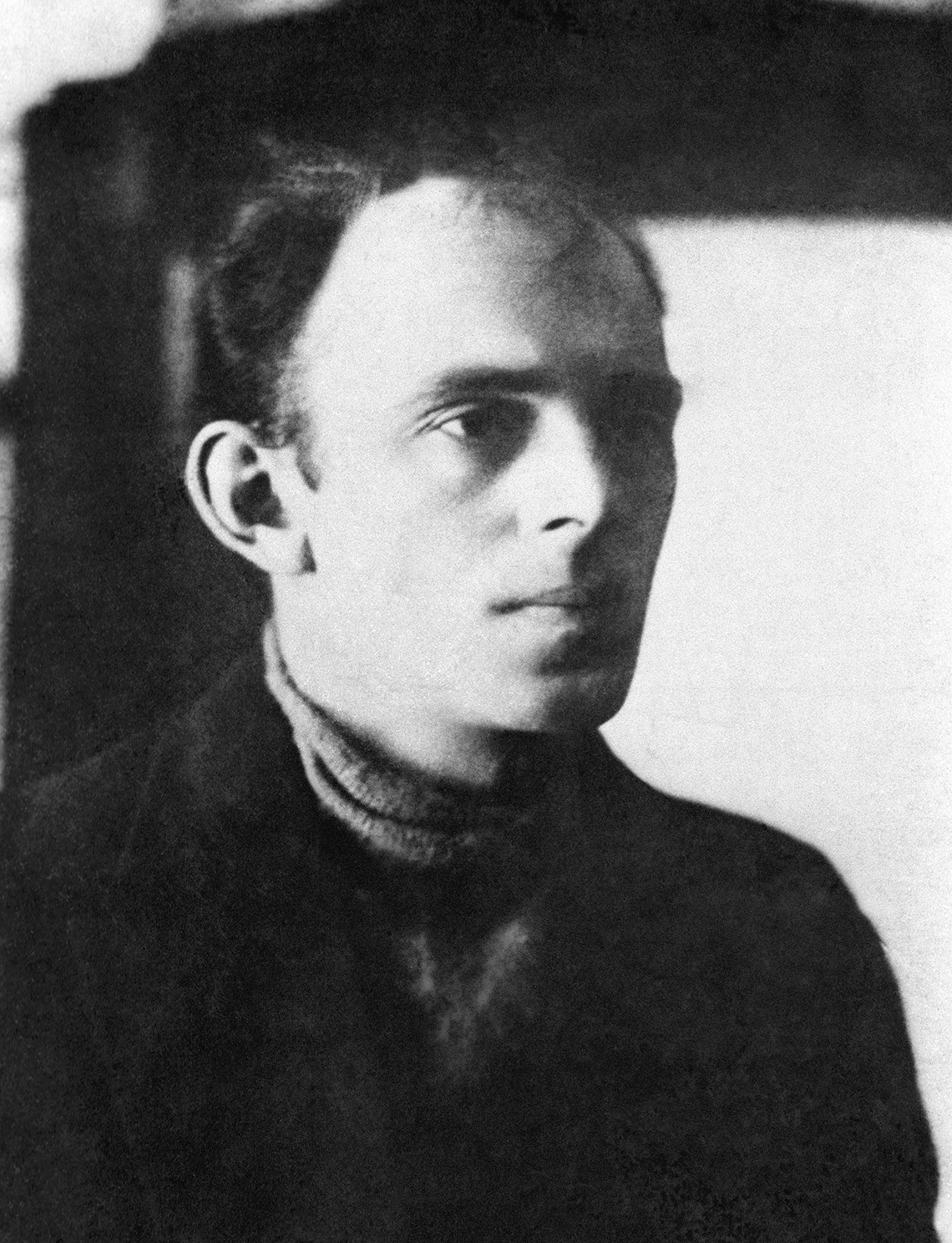

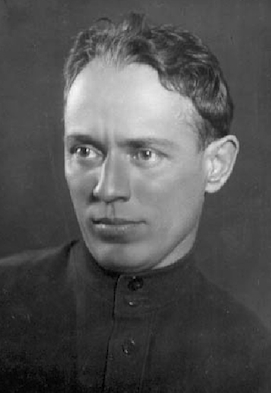

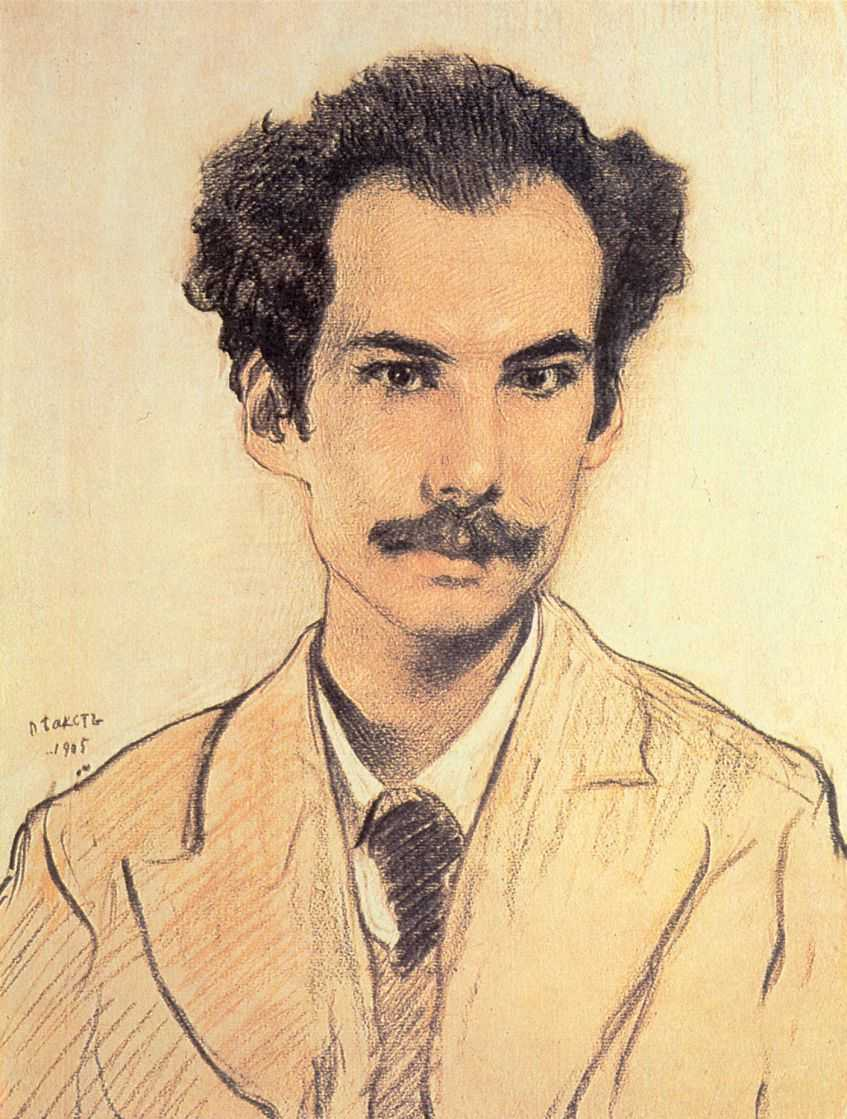

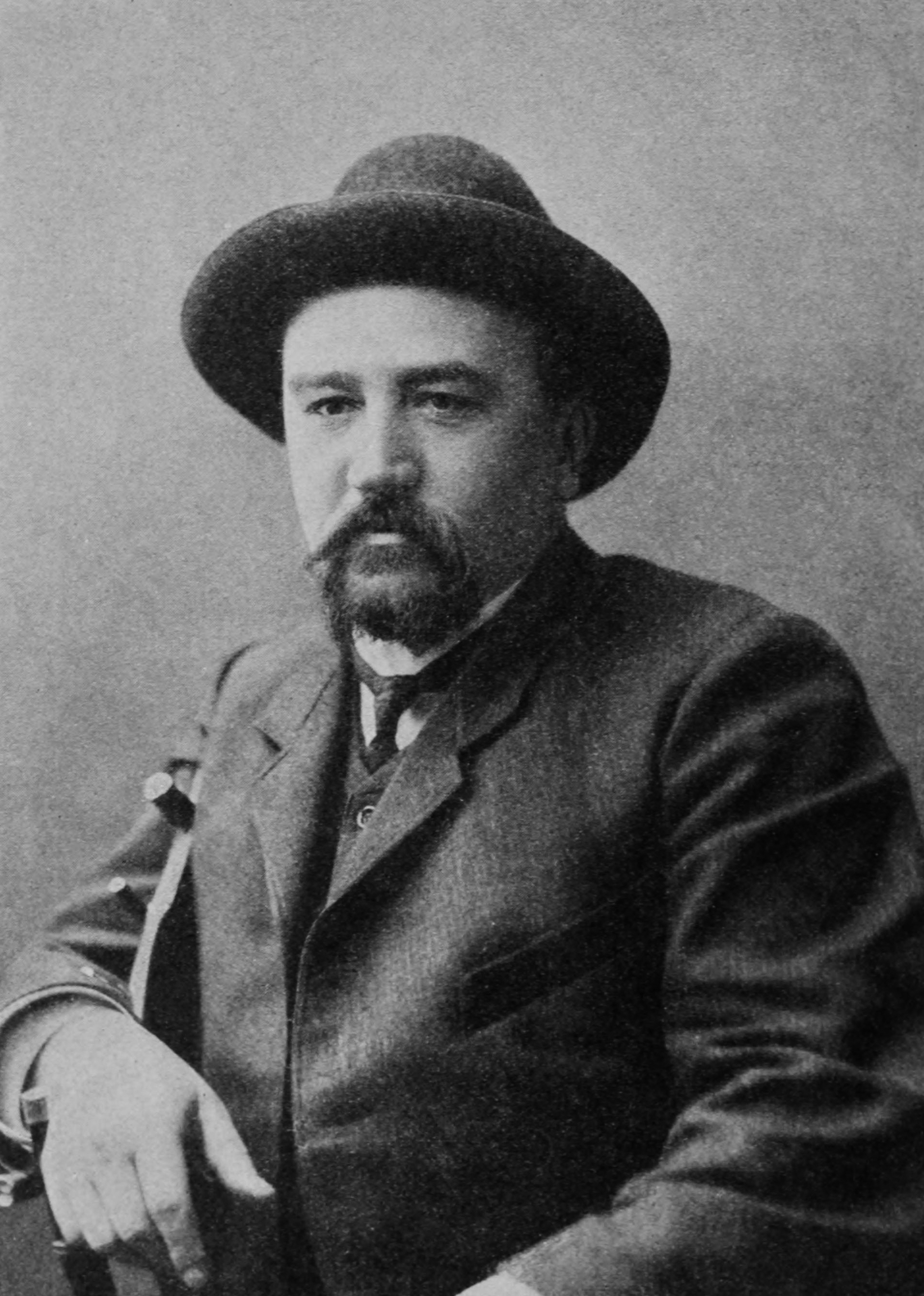

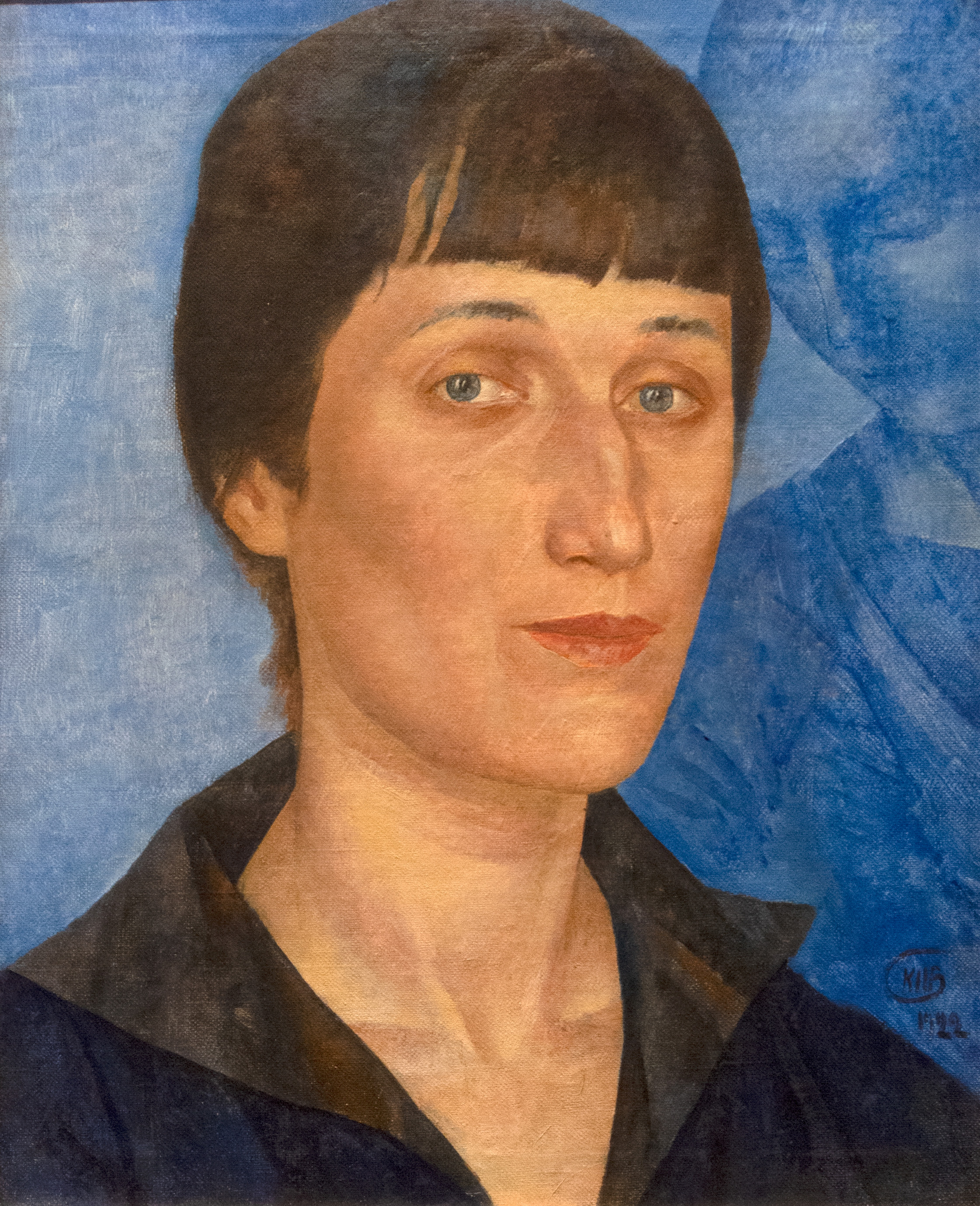

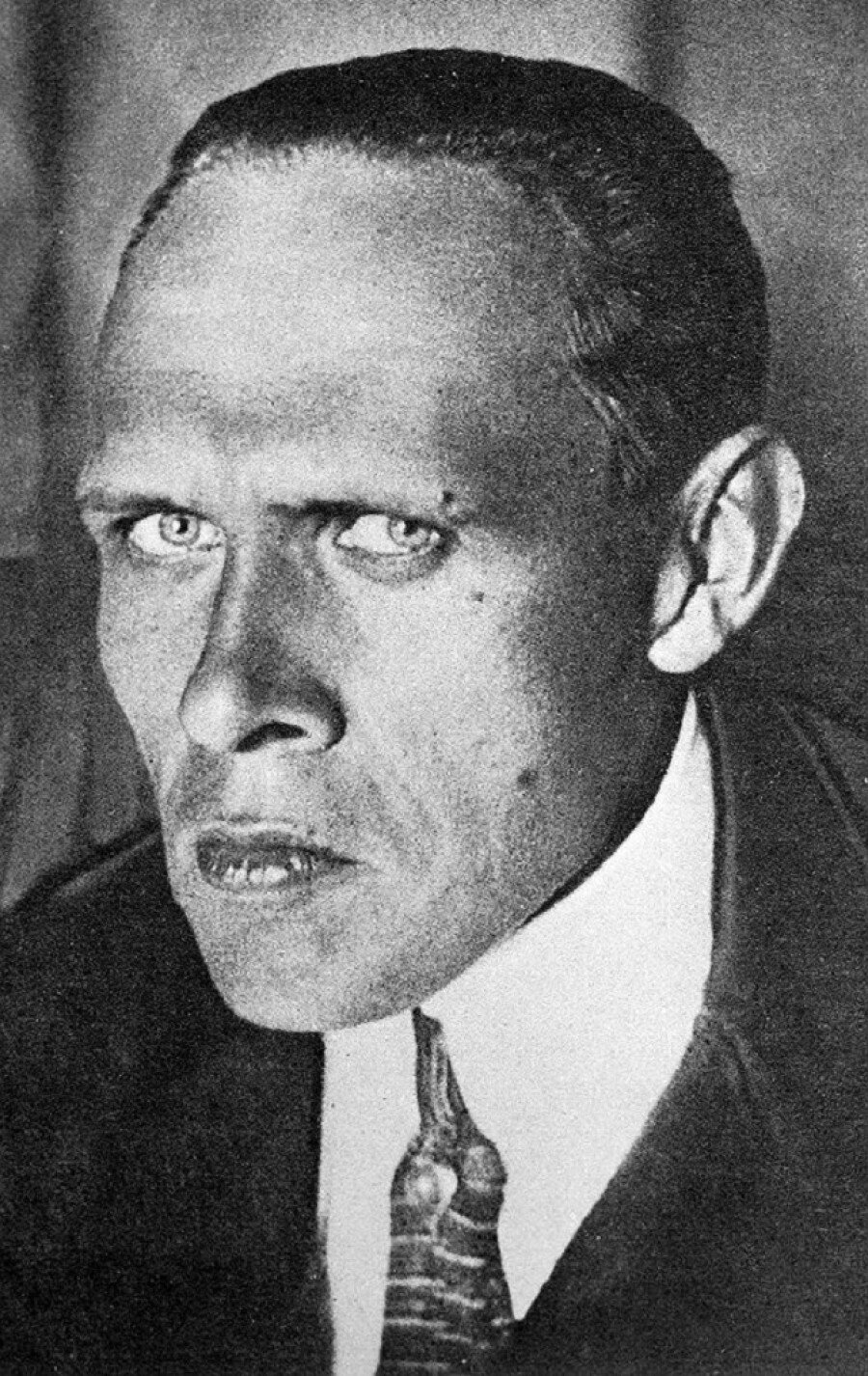

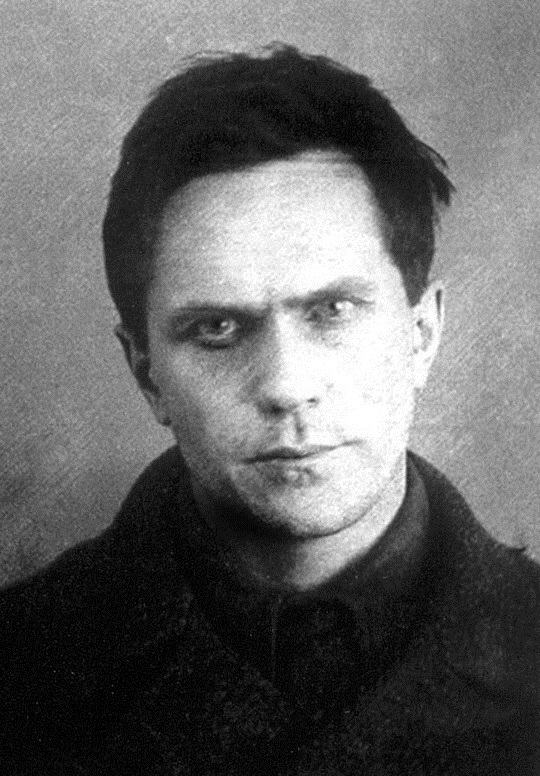
Tolstoy	Dostoyevsky	Bulgakov	Solzhenitsyn	Nabokov
Pushkin	Turgenev	Chekhov	Blok	Bunin
Tsvetaeva	Gogol	Lermontov	Gorky	Pasternak
Mayakovsky	Zamyatin	Goncharov	Leskov	Shchedrin
Yesenin	Platonov	Babel	Krylov	Mandelstam
Sholokhov	Bely	Kuprin	Akhmatova	Kharms
Shalamov

This is a list of authors who have written works of prose and poetry in the Russian language.

For separate lists by literary field:

- List of Russian-language novelists
- List of Russian-language playwrights
- List of Russian-language poets

== A ==
- Bavasan Abiduev (1909–1940), poet; one of the founders of Buryat children's literature
- Alexander Ablesimov (1742–1783), dramatist, journalist, opera librettist, poet, and satirist
- Fyodor Abramov (1920–1983), novelist (Two Winters and Three Summers) and short-story writer
- Grigory Adamov (1886–1945) science-fiction novelist (The Mystery of the Two Oceans)
- Georgy Adamovich (1892–1972), critic, memoirist, poet, and translator
- Anastasia Afanasieva (born 1982), physician, writer, including poet and translator
- Alexander Afanasyev (1826–1871), folklorist; recorded and published over 600 Russian folktales and fairytales (Russian Fairy Tales)
- Alexander Afanasyev-Chuzhbinsky (1816–1875), writer, including editor, ethnographer, poet, and translator
- Alexander Afinogenov (1904–1941), playwright (A Far Place)
- M. Ageyev (1898–1973), pseudonymous novelist (Novel with Cocaine)
- Chinghiz Aitmatov (1928–2008), Kyrgyz novelist (Jamilya, The Day Lasts More Than a Hundred Years) and short-story writer
- David Aizman (1869–1922), Russian-Jewish novelist and playwright
- Bella Akhmadulina (1937–2010), poet (The String collection) , short-story writer, and translator
- Anna Akhmatova (1889–1966), acmeist poet (Requiem elegy, Poem Without a Hero)
- Ivan Aksakov (1823–1886), journalist, poet, Slavophile
- Konstantin Aksakov (1817–1860), historian, playwright, social critic, and Slavophile
- Sergey Aksakov (1791–1859), novelist and miscellaneous writer (The Scarlet Flower literary fairy tale)
- Vasily Aksyonov (1932–2009), novelist (Generations of Winter) and short-story writer
- Boris Akunin (born 1956), essayist, literary critic, novelist (Erast Fandorin series, Sister Pelagia series), and translator
- Mikhail Albov, (1851–1911), novelist and short-story writer
- Mark Aldanov (died 1957), historical novelist
- Andrey Aldan-Semenov (1908–1985), Gulag memoirist
- Lidiia Alekseeva (1909–1989), Latvian poet and short-story writer
- Mikhail Alekseyev (1918–2007) editor and writer (My Stalingrad autobiographical novel)
- Sholem Aleichem (1859–1916), Russian-Jewish novelist (Wandering Stars), playwright, and short-story writer
- Margarita Aliger (1915–1992), journalist, poet ("Zoya"), and translator
- Yuz Aleshkovsky (1929–2022), writer, poet, playwright and performer of his own songs, Kangaroo
- Boris Almazov (1827–1876), poet, translator and literary critic
- Alexander Amfiteatrov (1862–1938), writer and historian, Napoleonder
- Daniil Andreyev (1906–1959), writer, poet, and Christian mystic, Roza Mira
- Leonid Andreyev (1871–1919), novelist, playwright and short story writer, The Seven Who Were Hanged, The Life of Man
- Sergey Andreyevsky (1847–1918), writer, poet, literary critic, The Book on Death
- Irakly Andronikov (1908–1990), writer, historian, philologist and media personality
- Anna Mitrofanovna Aníchkova (1868/1869 – 1935), writer and translator who wrote under the pseudonym Ivan Strannik
- Pavel Annenkov (1813–1887), critic and memoirist, The Extraordinary Decade
- Yury Annenkov (1889–1974), artist and writer, A Tale of Trivia
- Innokenty Annensky (1855–1909), poet, critic and translator, representative of the first wave of Russian Symbolism
- Lev Anninsky (1934–2019) writer, literary historian and critic
- Pavel Antokolsky (1896–1978), poet, All We Who in His Name
- Maxim Antonovich (1835–1918), critic, essayist, memoirist, translator and philosopher
- Elena Apreleva (1846–1923), writer, memoirist, playwright, Guilty without Guilt
- Aleksey Apukhtin (1840–1893), poet and writer, From Death to Life
- Maria Arbatova (born 1957), novelist, short story writer, playwright, poet and journalist
- Aleksei Arbuzov (1908–1986), playwright, A Long Road
- Vladimir Arnoldi (1871–1924), children's author and professor of biology
- Mikhail Artsybashev (1878–1927), naturalist writer and playwright, Sanin
- Nikolai Aseev (1889–1963), futurist poet, Night Flute
- Viktor Astafyev (1924–2001), novelist and short story writer, Sad Detective
- Lera Auerbach (Averbakh) (born 1973), poet, writer and composer
- Mikhail Avdeev (1821–1876), novelist and playwright, Tamarin trilogy
- Arkady Averchenko (1881–1925), satirical writer and playwright, Ninochka
- Vasily Avseenko (1842–1913), writer, journalist and literary critic
- Hizgil Avshalumov (1913–2001), Soviet novelist, poet and playwright
- Gennadiy Aygi (1934–2006), Chuvash poet and translator
- Vasily Azhayev (1915–1968), novelist, Far from Moscow

== B ==
- Semyon Babayevsky (1909–2000), novelist and short story writer, Golden Star Chavalier
- Isaak Babel (1894–1940), short story writer, The Odessa Tales, Red Cavalry
- Eduard Bagritsky (1895–1934), constructivist poet, February
- Grigory Baklanov (1923–2009), novelist and magazine editor, Forever Nineteen
- Ivan Bakhtin (1756–1818), poet, satirist and politician
- Mikhail Bakhtin (1895–1975), philosopher, literary critic, semiotician and scholar, "Epic and Novel"
- Mikhail Bakunin (1814–1876), revolutionary and theorist of collectivist anarchism, God and the State, Statism and Anarchy
- Konstantin Balmont (1867–1942), symbolist poet and translator, Burning Buildings, Let Us Be Like the Sun
- Jurgis Baltrušaitis (1873–1944), poet and translator, The Pendulum
- Kazimir Barantsevich (1851–1927), writer and poet, Family Hearth
- Yevgeny Baratynsky (1800–1844), poet, The Gipsy
- Natalya Baranskaya (1908–2004), novelist and short story writer, A Week Like Any Other
- Ivan Barkov (1732–1768), comic and erotic poet
- Anna Barkova (1901–1976), poet and writer, Gulag survivor
- Elpidifor Barsov (1836–1917), literary historian, ethnographer, folklorist, philologist
- Agniya Barto (1906–1981), Russian-Jewish poet and children's writer
- Alexander Bashlachev (1960–1988), poet, musician, guitarist, and singer-songwriter
- Fyodor Batyushkov (1857–1920), philologist, essayist, literary and theatre historian
- Konstantin Batyushkov (1787–1855), poet, essayist and translator
- Nikolai Bazhin (1843–1908), writer, journalist and critic, The History of One People's Partnership
- Pavel Bazhov (1879–1950), fairy tale author, The Malachite Casket
- Demyan Bedny (1883–1945), poet and satirist, New Testament Without Defects
- Dmitry Begichev (1786–1855), writer and politician
- Alexander Bek (1903–1972), novelist, And Not to Die
- Ekaterina Beketova (1855–1892), poet, writer, and translator
- Vissarion Belinsky (1811–1848), writer, literary critic and philosopher
- Vasily Belov (1932–2012), writer, poet and dramatist, Eves, The Year of a Major Breakdown
- Andrei Bely (1880–1934), symbolist poet, writer and essayist, The Silver Dove, Petersburg
- Alexander Belyayev (1884–1942), science fiction author, Amphibian Man
- Vladimir Benediktov (1807–1873); poet and translator
- Nina Berberova (1901–1993), novelist and short story writer, The Book of Happiness
- Nikolai Berg (1823–1884), poet, journalist, translator and historian
- Olga Bergholz (1910–1975), poet, playwright and memoirist
- Alexander Bestuzhev (1797–1837), novelist, short story writer and Decembrist, An Evening on Bivouac
- Vitaly Bianki (1894–1959), nature and children's writer
- Aleksei Bibik (1878–1976), working-class novelist and short story writer
- Andrei Bitov (1937–2018), novelist and short story writer, Pushkin House
- Nikolai Blagoveshchensky (1837–1889), writer, journalist and biographer
- Helena Blavatsky (1831–1891), a founder of Theosophy and the Theosophical Society, The Secret Doctrine, Isis Unveiled
- Pyotr Blinov (1913–1942), Udmurt writer and journalist
- Alexander Blok (1880–1921), poet, The Twelve
- Pyotr Boborykin (1836–1921), writer, playwright and journalist, China Town
- Oleg Bogayev (born 1970), playwright, The Russian National Postal Service
- Andrei Bogdanov (1692–1766), bibliographer and ethnographer
- Alexander Bogdanov (1873–1928), novelist, physician, economist and philosopher, Red Star
- Vladimir Bogomolov (1926–2003), novelist and short story writer, Ivan
- Vladimir Bogoraz (1865–1936), revolutionary, writer and anthropologist
- Yuri Bondarev (1924–2020), novelist and short story writer, The Shore
- Leonid Borodin (1938–2011), novelist and journalist, The Story of a Strange Time
- Genrikh Borovik (born 1929), publicist, writer, playwright and filmmaker
- Vasily Botkin (1812–1869), critic, essayist and translator
- Valeri Brainin-Passek (born 1948), Russian/German musicologist, music manager, composer and poet
- Osip Brik (1888–1945), avant garde writer and literary critic
- Joseph Brodsky (1940–1996), poet and essayist, 1987 Nobel Prize in Literature laureate
- Valery Bryusov (1873–1924), poet, novelist and short story writer, The Fiery Angel
- Yury Buida (born 1954), novelist and short story writer, The Zero Train
- Vladimir Bukovsky (1942–2019), writer and dissident
- Mikhail Bulgakov (1891–1940), novelist, short story writer and playwright, Heart of a Dog, The White Guard, The Master and Margarita
- Faddey Bulgarin (1789–1859), Polish-born writer and journalist
- Kir Bulychev (1934–2003), science fiction author, Half a Life
- Ivan Bunin (1870–1953), 1933 Nobel Prize in Literature laureate (first Russian Nobel laureate in literature), The Village, The Life of Arseniev, Dark Avenues
- Anna Bunina (1774–1829), poet, Though Poverty's No Stain
- Viktor Burenin (1841–1926), writer, critic, playwright, librettist and satirical poet
- David Burliuk (1882–1967), illustrator, publicist and author associated with Russian Futurism
- Dmitry Bykov (born 1967)
- Pyotr Bykov (1844–1930) literary historian, poet and translator
- Vasil Bykov (1924–2003)

== C ==
- Dimitrie Cantemir (1673–1723), composer, ethnographer, geographer, historian, linguist, musicologist, and philosopher
- Catherine the Great, (1729–1796), patroness of the arts, music and theatre, and opera librettist (Fevey)
- Pyotr Chaadayev (1794–1856), philosopher ("Philosophical Letters")
- Aleksey Chapygin (1870–1937), novelist (Stepan Razin) and short story writer
- Lidia Charskaya (1875–1938), actresses and novelist
- Nikolai Chayev (1824–1914), playwright (Svat Faddeyich) and poet
- Alexander Chekhov (1855–1913), essayist, memoirist, novelist, and short story writer
- Anton Chekhov (1860–1904), playwright (The Seagull, The Cherry Orchard) and short story writer ("Ward No. 6", "The Lady with the Dog")
- Nikolay Chernyshevsky (1828–1889), journalist, novelist (What Is to Be Done?), and politician
- Evgeny Chirikov (1864–1932), novelist, playwright, and short story writer ("The Magician")
- Sasha Chorny (1880–1932), children's writer, poet, and satirist
- Lydia Chukovskaya (1907–1996), writer, including novelist (Sofia Petrovna novella) and poet
- Korney Chukovsky (1882–1969), children's poet ("Wash'em Clean")
- Georgy Chulkov (1879–1939), critic, editor, and poet

== D ==
- Denis Davydov (1784–1839), soldier-poet of the Napoleonic Wars
- Vladimir Dal (1801–1872), writer and lexicographer, Explanatory Dictionary
- Yuli Daniel (1925–1988), dissident writer, poet and translator, This is Moscow Speaking
- Grigory Danilevsky (1829–1890), historical and ethnographical novelist, Moscow in Flames
- Anton Delvig (1798–1831), poet, journalist and magazine editor
- Grigoriy Demidovtsev (born 1960), writer and playwright
- Andrey Dementyev (1928–2018), poet and writer
- Boris Derevensky (born 1962), writer and historian
- Regina Derieva (1949–2013), poet, writer and essayist
- Gavrila Derzhavin (1743–1816), poet and statesman, Let the Thunder of Victory Sound!
- Nikolai Devitte (1811–1844), poet, harpist and songwriter, Not for Me.
- Andrei Dmitriev (born 1956), novelist and short story writer, winner of the 2012 Russian Booker Prize
- Ivan Dmitriev (1760–1837), sentimentalist poet and Russian Minister of Justice
- Valentina Dmitryeva (1859–1947), writer, doctor and teacher, Hveska, the Doctor's Watchman
- Nikolay Dobrolyubov (1836–1861), literary critic, journalist, poet and essayist
- Leonid Dobychin (1894–1936), novelist and short story writer, The Town of N
- Yevgeniy Dolmatovsky (1915–1994) poet and songwriter
- Yury Dombrovsky (1909–1978), poet, writer and Gulag survivor, The Faculty of Useless Knowledge
- Vlas Doroshevich (1864–1922), journalist, writer and drama critic, The Way of the Cross
- Lyubov Dostoyevskaya (1869–1926), novelist and biographer, The Emigrant
- Fyodor Dostoyevsky (1821–1881), writer, essayist, journalist and editor, Notes from Underground, Crime and Punishment, The Idiot, Demons, The Brothers Karamazov, The House of the Dead, The Gambler, "White Nights", "A Gentle Creature", "The Dream of a Ridiculous Man"
- Mikhail Dostoyevsky (1820–1864), writer, critic and editor, Vremya
- Sergei Dovlatov (1941–1990), novelist, short story writer and journalist, Affiliate
- Spiridon Drozhzhin (1848–1930), poet, At the Village Assembly
- Yulia Drunina (1924–1991), poet and politician
- Alexander Druzhinin (1824–1864), writer and magazine editor, Polinka Saks
- Vladimir Dudintsev (1918–1998), novelist, Not by Bread Alone
- Sergey Durov (1816–1869), poet, translator, writer, and political activist
- Nadezhda Durova (1783–1866), soldier and writer, The Cavalry Maiden

== E ==
- Yevgeny Edelson (1824–1868), literary critic, essayist and translator
- Ilya Ehrenburg (1891–1967), novelist and WWII war correspondent, The Black Book, The Thaw
- Natan Eidelman (1930–1989), author, biographer and historian
- Grigory Eliseev (1821–1891) essayist, historian, editor, and publisher.
- Sergey Elpatyevsky (1854–1933), novelist and short story writer, Pity Me!
- Nikolai Engelhardt (1867–1942), writer, critic, poet, journalist and memoirist
- Asar Eppel (1935–2012), writer and translator, Red Caviar Sandwiches
- Nikolai Erdman (1900–1970), playwright, The Suicide
- Victor Erofeyev (born 1947), writer, literary critic and magazine editor, Russian Beauty
- Alexander Ertel (1855–1908), novelist and short story writer, A Greedy Peasant
- Mikhail Evstafiev (born 1963), artist, photographer and writer, Two Steps from Heaven
- Nikolai Evreinov (1879–1953), director, dramatist and theatre practitioner, The Storming of the Winter Palace

== F ==
- Alexander Fadeyev (1901–1956), novelist, known for his war fiction, The Rout, The Young Guard
- Konstantin Fedin (1892–1977), novelist, Cities and Years
- Georgy Fedotov (1886–1951), religious philosopher, historian and essayist
- Afanasy Fet (1820–1892), poet and translator
- Vera Figner (1852–1942), revolutionary and writer, member of Narodnaya Volya
- Terty Filippov (1825–1899) folklorist, essayist, editor and pedagogue
- Dmitry Filosofov (1872–1940) essayist, critic, religious thinker, editor and political activist
- Konstantin Fofanov (1862–1911), poet, considered to be a precursor of the symbolists, Shadows and Mystery
- Denis Fonvizin (1744–1792), dramatist, The Minor
- Olga Forsh (1873–1961), writer, dramatist, memoirist and scenarist, Palace and Prison
- Ruvim Frayerman (1891–1972) writer, poet, essayist and journalist, Wild Dog Dingo
- Dmitry Furmanov (1891–1926), writer, known for his Russian Civil War novel Chapayev

== G ==
- Cherubina de Gabriak (1887–1928), pseudonymous poet
- Arkady Gaidar (1904–1941), children's writer, Timur and His Squad
- Alexey Galakhov (1807–1892), writer, memoirist and literary historian, The History of Russian Literature
- Alexander Galich (1918–1977), poet, screenwriter, playwright and singer-songwriter
- Alisa Ganieva (pseudonym Gulla Khirachev) (born 1985), writer and essayist
- Nikolai Garin-Mikhailovsky (1852–1906), writer, essayist and engineer, Practical Training
- Vsevolod Garshin (1855–1888), short story writer, "Four Days", "The Red Flower"
- Aleksei Gastev (1882–1939), avant garde poet
- Gaito Gazdanov (1903–1971), novelist and short story writer, An Evening with Claire, The Spectre of Alexander Wolf
- Mikhail Gerasimov (1889–1939), working-class poet
- Yuri German (1910–1967), writer, playwright, screenwriter and journalist, The Cause You Serve
- Vladimir Gilyarovsky (1853–1935), writer and journalist, The Stories of the Slums
- Lidiya Ginzburg (1902–1990), literary critic and a survivor of the Siege of Leningrad, Blockade Diary
- Yevgenia Ginzburg (1904–1977), Gulag memoirist, Journey into the Whirlwind, Within the Whirlwind
- Zinaida Gippius (1869–1945), essayist, memoirist, writer, poet and playwright, The Green Ring
- Anatoly Gladilin (1935–2018), novelist, Moscow Racetrack
- Fyodor Gladkov (1883–1958), novelist and short story writer, Cement
- Nikolay Glazkov (1919–1979), poet, creator of the term "Samizdat"
- Fyodor Glinka (1786–1880), poet and playwright, Karelia
- Boris Glinsky (1860–1917) writer, publicist, publisher, editor and politician
- Dmitry Glukhovsky (born 1979), writer and journalist, Metro 2033
- Nikolay Gnedich (1784–1833), poet and translator, The Fishers
- Pyotr Gnedich (1855–1925), novelist, poet, playwright, translator, theatre entrepreneur and art historian
- Nikolai Gogol (1809–1852), writer and dramatist, Evenings on a Farm Near Dikanka, The Government Inspector, Dead Souls
- Arseny Golenishchev-Kutuzov (1848–1913), poet, Songs and Dances of Death
- Boris Golovin (born 1955), singer-songwriter, musician, poet and novelist
- Ivan Goncharov (1812–1891), novelist, Oblomov
- Natalya Gorbanevskaya (1936–2013), poet, translator and civil rights activist
- Ivan Gorbunov (1831–1896), writer and stage actor, The Scenes from People's Life
- Dmitry Gorchakov (1758–1824), poet, playwright and satirist
- Grigori Gorin (1940–2000), writer, playwright and screenwriter, The Very Same Munchhausen
- Maxim Gorky (1868–1936), novelist, short story writer and playwright, The Lower Depths, Mother, My Childhood. In the World. My Universities, The Life of Klim Samgin
- Nina Gorlanova (born 1947), novelist and short story writer
- Sergey Gorodetsky (1884–1967), poet, one of the founders of the acmeist school
- Daniil Granin (1919–2017), novelist, Those Who Seek
- Nikolay Gretsch (1787–1867), journalist, writer and magazine editor, Northern Bee
- Aleksander Griboyedov (1795–1828), dramatist and statesman, Woe from Wit
- Dmitry Grigorovich (1822–1900), novelist, The Fishermen
- Oleg Grigoriev (1943–1992), poet and artist
- Apollon Grigoryev (1822–1864), poet, literary and theatrical critic, translator and memoirist
- Alexander Grin (1880–1932), author of novels and stories set in Grinlandia, Scarlet Sails
- Isabella Grinevskaya (1864–1944), poet, writer and playwright
- Vasily Grossman (1905–1964), writer and war correspondent, Life and Fate
- Vitali Gubarev (1912–1981), journalist and writer
- Igor Guberman (born 1936), writer and satirical poet
- Semyon Gudzenko (1922–1953), poet of the World War II generation
- Lev Gumilev (1912–1992), historian, ethnologist and anthropologist
- Nikolay Gumilev (1886–1921), poet, founder of the acmeist movement
- Elena Guro (1877–1913), futurist writer and painter, The Hurdy-Gurdy
- Andrei Gusev (born 1952), writer and journalist, The World According to Novikoff
- Sergey Gusev-Orenburgsky (1867–1963), novelist, The Land of the Fathers

== H ==
- Yelena Hahn, writer for Biblioteka Dlya Chteniya and Otechestvennye Zapiski, mother of Helena Blavatsky
- Alexander Herzen (1812–1870), essayist, novelist, philosopher and magazine editor, Who is to Blame?

== I ==
- Ilf and Petrov (Ilf 1897–1937) (Petrov 1903–1942), satirical writers, The Twelve Chairs, The Little Golden Calf
- Vera Inber (1890–1972), poet and writer, Lalla's Interests
- Mikhail Isakovsky (1900–1973), poet and songwriter, Katyusha
- Fazil Iskander, (1929–2016), Abkhaz writer, Sandro of Chegem
- Alexei Ivanov (born 1969), novelist and screenwriter
- Georgy Ivanov (1894–1958), poet and essayist, Disintegration of the Atom
- Vsevolod Ivanov (1895–1963), writer and plawright, Armoured Train 14-69
- Vyacheslav Ivanov (1866–1949), poet, playwright, philosopher, translator and literary critic
- Yuri Ivask (1907–1986), poet, essayist, literary critic and historian
- Ryurik Ivnev (1891–1981), poet, novelist and translator
- Sergey Izgiyayev (1922–1972), poet, playwright and translator
- Alexander Izmaylov (1779–1831), fabulist, poet and novelist

== K ==
- Gavril Kamenev (1772–1803), poet, writer and translator
- Vasily Kamensky (1884–1961), poet, playwright and artist, one of the first Russian aviators
- Antiochus Kantemir (1708–1744), writer and poet, On the Envy and Pride of Evil-Minded Courtiers
- Nikolay Karamzin (1766–1826), poet, writer and historian, Poor Liza
- Aleksandr Karasyov (born 1971), writer, Russian war prose
- Pyotr Karatygin (1805–1879), playwright, actor and memoirist
- Nikolay Karazin (1842–1908), painter and writer, The Two-Legged Wolf
- Nikolay Karonin-Petropavlovsky (1853–1892), narodnik writer, First Storm
- Evtikhy Pavlovich Karpov (1857–1926), playwright and theatre director
- Vladimir Karpov (1922–2010), novelist and magazine editor, The Commander
- Vasily Kapnist (1758–1823), poet and playwright, Chicane
- Lev Kassil (1905–1970), writer of juvenile and young adult literature
- Ivan Kataev (1902–1937), novelist and short story writer, Immortality
- Valentin Kataev (1897–1986), writer and playwright, Time, Forward!
- Pavel Katenin (1792–1853), classicist poet, dramatist and literary critic
- Mikhail Katkov (1818–1887), journalist and publicist, Moscow News
- Veniamin Kaverin (1902–1989), novelist, The Two Captains
- Emmanuil Kazakevich (1913–1962), writer, poet and playwright, The Blue Notebook
- Yury Kazakov (1927–1982), short story writer, Going To Town
- Rimma Kazakova (1932–2008), poet, Let's Meet in the East
- Dmitri Kedrin (1907–1945), poet, Confession
- Yuri Khanon (born 1965), novelist and eccentric, Skryabin As a Face
- Mark Kharitonov (born 1937), writer, poet, and translator, Lines of Fate
- Yevgeny Kharitonov (1941–1981), writer, poet, playwright and theater director
- Daniil Kharms (1905–1942), novelist, short story writer and playwright, The Old Woman, Incidences, Elizaveta Bam
- Ivan Khemnitser (1745–1784), satirical poet, The Rich Man and the Poor Man
- Mikhail Kheraskov (1733–1807), poet, writer and playwright, Vladimir Reborn
- Velimir Khlebnikov (1885–1922), futurist poet and author, Incantation by Laughter
- Nikolai Khmelnitsky (1789–1845), playwright, literary critic and translator, Chatterbox
- Vladislav Khodasevich (1886–1939), poet and literary critic
- Aleksey Khomyakov (1804–1860), poet, co-founder of the slavophile movement
- Nadezhda Khvoshchinskaya (1824–1889), writer, critic and translator, The Boarding-School Girl
- Ivan Kireyevsky (1806–1856), writer, co-founder of the slavophile movement
- Dmitry Khvostov (1757–1835), poet and fabulist
- Vladimir Kirshon (1902–1938), playwright, The Miraculous Alloy
- Marusya Klimova (born 1961), writer and translator
- Daniel Kluger (born 1951), author and songwriter
- Nikolai Klyuev (1884–1937), peasant poet, A Northern Poem
- Viktor Klyushnikov (1841–1892), writer, editor and journalist, The Haze
- Yakov Knyazhnin (1740/42–1791), playwright, poet and translator, The Braggart
- Vsevolod Kochetov (1912–1973), novelist and journalist, The Zhurbin Family
- Pavel Kogan (1918–1942), poet and military interpreter
- Ivan Kokorev (1825–1853), short story writer and essayist
- Alexandra Kollontai (1872–1952), writer, feminist and important political figure, Love of Worker Bees
- Aleksey Koltsov (1809–1842), poet, An Old Man's Song
- Mikhail Koltsov (1898–1940/42), journalist and satirist
- Fyodor Koni (1809–1889), dramatist, theatre critic, literary historian, editor and memoirist
- Evgenia Konradi (1838–1898), essayist, journalist, writer, and women's education advocate
- Lev Kopelev (1912–1997), writer, journalist and dissident
- Apollon Korinfsky (1868–1937), writer, poet, essayist, translator and memoirist
- Oleksandr Korniychuk (1905–1972), playwright, literary critic and state official, In the Steppes of Ukraine
- Vladimir Korolenko (1853–1921), writer and memoirist, The Blind Musician
- Nestor Kotlyarevsky (1863–1925), writer, publicist, literary critic and historian, The Nineteenth Century
- Arkady Kots (1872–1943), poet and translator, Proletarian Songs
- Yury Koval (1938–1995), writer and artist
- Sofia Kovalevskaya (1859–1891), writer and mathematician, Nihilist Girl
- Vadim Kozhevnikov (1909–1984), novelist and short story writer, Shield and Sword
- Nadezhda Kozhevnikova (born 1949), writer and journalist, Attorney Alexandra Tikhonovna
- Ivan Kozlov (1779–1840), poet and translator, The Monk
- Eugene Kozlovsky (born 1946), writer, journalist, theatre director and film director
- Vasili Krasovsky (1782–1824), poet, Scrolls of the Muse
- Andrey Krayevsky (1810–1889), journalist, publicist, publisher and editor, Otechestvennye Zapiski
- Vsevolod Krestovsky (1840–1895), writer, Knights of Industry
- Peter Kropotkin (1842–1921), writer and anarchist theorist, In Russian and French Prisons
- Aleksei Kruchenykh (1886–1968), futurist poet, co-creator of the literary concept "Zaum"
- Vladimir Krupin (born 1941), writer, editor and religious author, Aqua Vitae
- Ivan Krylov (1769–1844), major fabulist and dramatist
- Gleb Krzhizhanovsky (1872–1959), poet, author of the Russian version of the Warszawianka
- Sigizmund Krzhizhanovsky (1887–1950), short story writer, Quadraturin
- Anatoly Kudryavitsky (born 1954), poet and novelist
- Pyotr Kudryavtsev (1816–1858), writer, historian, literary critic, philologist and journalist
- Nestor Kukolnik (1809–1868), playwright, poet and librettist, A Life for the Tsar
- Aleksandr Kuprin (1870–1938), novelist and short story writer, The Duel
- Wilhelm Küchelbecker (1797–1846), poet and magazine editor, Mnemozina
- Nikolai Kurochkin (1830–1884), poet, editor, translator and essayist
- Vasily Kurochkin (1831–1875), satirical poet, journalist and translator
- Vladimir Kurochkin (1829–1885), dramatist, translator, editor and publisher
- Ivan Kushchevsky (1847–1876), novelist and short story writer, Nikolai Negorev
- Alexander Kushner (born 1936), poet and essayist, The First Impression
- Dmitry Kuzmin (born 1968), poet, critic and publisher
- Mikhail Kuzmin (1872–1936), poet and novelist, Wings
- Anatoly Kuznetsov (1929–1979), novelist, Babi Yar: A Document in the Form of a Novel

== L ==
- Lazar Lagin (1903–1979), satirist and children's writer, Old Khottabych
- Yuri Laptev (1903–1984), writer and journalist, Zarya
- Yulia Latynina (born 1966), writer and journalist, The Insider
- Boris Lavrenyov (1891–1959), writer and playwright, Such a Simple Thing
- Pyotr Lavrov (1823–1900), prominent theorist of narodism, philosopher, publicist and sociologist.
- Ivan Lazhechnikov (1792–1869), historical novelist, The Heretic
- Vasily Lebedev-Kumach (1898–1949), poet and lyricist, Serdtse
- Anatoly Leman (1859–1913), writer and editor, The Gentry's Tale
- Vladimir Lenin (1870–1924), revolutionary and Marxist theoretician and publicist
- Leonid Leonov (1899–1994), major novelist and short story writer, The Thief
- Konstantin Leontiev (1831–1891), philosopher and essayist
- Mikhail Lermontov (1814–1841), major poet, playwright and novelist, A Hero of Our Time
- Nikolai Leskov (1831–1895), novelist, short story writer and journalist, Lady Macbeth of the Mtensk District, The Cathedral Clergy, The Enchanted Wanderer
- Alexander Levitov (1835–1877), short story writer, Leatherhide the Cobbler
- Nikolay Leykin (1841–1906), writer and publisher, Fragments Magazine
- Vladimir Lichutin (born 1940), writer and essayist
- Mikhail Lifshitz (1905–1983), Marxian literary critic and philosopher of art
- Viktor Likhonosov (1936–2021), writer and editor, Unwritten Memoirs. Our Little Paris.
- Eduard Limonov (1943–2020), writer and dissident, It's Me, Eddie
- Dmitri Lipskerov (born 1964), writer and playwright, The Forty Years of Changzhoeh
- Mirra Lokhvitskaya (1869–1905), poet and playwright
- Mikhail Lomonosov (1711–1765), polymath, scientist, writer and linguistic reformer
- Vladimir Lugovskoy (1901–1957), constructivist poet
- Sergey Lukyanenko (born 1968), popular science-fiction and fantasy author, The Stars Are Cold Toys
- Anatoly Lunacharsky (1875–1933), journalist and publicist
- Lev Lunts (1901–1924), writer, playwright, essayist and critic, member of the Serapion Brothers

== M ==
- Grigori Machtet (1852–1901), novelist, short story writer and poet
- Vladimir Makanin (1937–2017), novelist and short story writer, Antileader
- Sergey Malitsky (born 1962), fantasy fiction writer
- Aleksandr Malyshkin (1892–1938), novelist and prose writer
- Dmitry Mamin-Sibiryak (1852–1912), novelist, The Privalov Fortune
- Nadezhda Mandelstam (1899–1980), writer and memoirist, Hope Against Hope, Hope Abandoned
- Osip Mandelstam (1891–1938), poet and writer, member of the acmeist school, The Stone
- Anatoly Marienhof (1897–1962), novelist, poet and playwright, A Novel Without Lies
- Alexandra Marinina (born 1957), writer of detective stories
- Evgeny Markov (1835–1903), writer, critic and ethnographer, Black Earth Field
- Georgi Markov (1911–1991), novelist, screenwriter, playwright
- Maria Markova (born 1982), poet
- Boleslav Markevich (1822–1884), writer, essayist, journalist, literary critic and translator
- Samuil Marshak (1887–1964), writer, translator and children's poet, The Twelve Months
- Vladilen Mashkovtsev (1929–1997), poet, writer and journalist
- Mikhail Matinsky (1750–1820), scientist, dramatist, librettist and opera composer.
- Vladimir Mayakovsky (1893–1930), futurist poet, writer and playwright, Mystery-Bouffe
- Apollon Maykov (1821–1897), poet and translator
- Valerian Maykov (1823–1847), literary critic, brother of Apollon Maykov
- Vasily Maykov (1728–1778), poet, fabulist, playwright and translator
- Lev Mei (1822–1862), poet and playwright, The Tsar's Bride
- Pavel Melnikov (1818–1883), ethnographical novelist, In the Forests
- Dmitry Merezhkovsky (1866–1941), poet and novelist, Christ and Antichrist
- Aleksey Merzlyakov (1778–1830), poet, critic, translator and professor
- Arvo Mets (1937–1997), poet and translator, Resemblance
- Alexander Mezhirov (1923–2009), poet, translator and critic
- Sergey Mikhalkov (1913–2009), children's writer, satirist and songwriter, author of the National Anthem of the Soviet Union
- Nikolay Mikhaylovsky (1842–1904), publicist, literary critic, sociologist and narodnik theoretician
- Dmitry Minayev (1835–1889), satirical poet, journalist, translator and literary critic
- Nikolai Minsky (1855–1937), poet, writer and translator, From the Gloom to the Light
- Boris Mozhayev (1923–1996), writer, playwright, script-writer and editor, Alive
- Daniil Mordovtsev (1830–1905), writer and historian of Ukrainian descent
- Yunna Morits (born 1937), poet and artist, The Vine
- Sergey Mstislavsky (1876–1943), writer, dramatist, publicist, anthropologist, editor and political activist
- Viktor Muyzhel (1880–1924), writer and painter
- Viktor Muravin (born 1929), novelist, The Diary of Vikenty Angarov

== N ==
- Vladimir Nabokov (1899–1977), poet and novelist, wrote first in Russian, then in English, author of Lolita
- Nikolai Nadezhdin (1804–1856), literary critic and ethnographer
- Semyon Nadson (1862–1887), poet, Pity the Stately Cypress Trees
- Yuri Nagibin (1920–1994), novelist, short story writer and screenwriter
- Vladimir Narbut (1888–1938), acmeist poet and magazine editor
- Vasily Narezhny (1780–1825), novelist, A Russian Gil Blas
- Sergey Narovchatov (1919–1981), writer and magazine editor, Novy Mir
- Nikolai Naumov, (1838–1901), essayist and short story writer, Cobweb
- Filipp Nefyodov (1838–1902), writer, journalist, editor, ethnographer and archeologist, Among People
- Nikolay Nekrasov (1821–1878), major poet and magazine editor, Who Can be Happy and Free in Russia?
- Viktor Nekrasov (1911–1987), novelist, Front-line Stalingrad
- Viktor Nekipelov (1928–1989), poet, writer and dissident
- Miroslav Nemirov (1961–2016), poet and songwriter
- Vasily Nemirovich-Danchenko (1845–1936), novelist, essayist and war correspondent
- Vladimir Nemirovich-Danchenko (1858–1943), theatre director, writer and playwright, co-founder of the Moscow Art Theatre
- Löb Nevakhovich (1776/78–1831), Russia-Jewish writer and playwright
- Alexander Neverov (1886–1923), writer and playwright, City of Bread
- Friedrich Neznansky (1932–2013), crime novelist, Red Square
- Ivan Nikitin (1824–1861), poet and writer, Kulak
- Nikolai Nikolev (1758–1815), poet and playwright
- Pavel Nilin (1908–1981), writer, journalist and playwright, Man Goes Uphill
- Nikolay Nosov (1908–1976), children's writer, Neznaika
- Yevgeny Nosov (1925–2002), writer, Usvyat Warriors
- Osip Notovich (1849–1914), publisher, playwright and essayist
- Alexey Novikov-Priboy (1877–1944), novelist and short story writer, The Captain

== O ==
- Vladimir Obruchev (1863–1956), science fiction writer, Sannikov Land
- Alexander Odoevsky (1802–1839), poet and playwright, activist of the Decembrist Revolt
- Vladimir Odoevsky (1803–1869), philosopher, writer, music critic, philanthropist and pedagogue, The Living Corpse
- Irina Odoyevtseva (1895–1990), poet, novelist and memoirist
- Nikolay Ogarev (1813–1877), poet, historian and political activist
- Bulat Okudzhava (1924–1997), poet, writer and singer-songwriter, The Art of Needles and Sins
- Yury Olesha (1899–1960), novelist and short story writer, Envy
- Nikolay Oleynikov (1898–1937), editor, avant-garde poet and playwright
- Vladimir Orlov (author) (1936–2014), novelist
- Levon Osepyan (1952–2024), writer, publisher, and photographer
- Mikhail Osorgin (1878–1942), journalist, novelist, short story writer and essayist
- Sergey Ostrovoy (1911–2005), poet, author of lyrics to many popular Soviet songs
- Alexander Ostrovsky (1823–1886), major playwright, The Storm
- Nikolai Ostrovsky (1904–1936), socialist realist writer, How the Steel Was Tempered
- Valentin Ovechkin (1904–1968), writer, playwright, journalist and war correspondent, Greetings from the Front
- Vladislav Ozerov (1769–1816), playwright, Dmitry Donskoy

== P ==
- Marina Palei (born 1955), scriptwriter, publicist, novelist and translator, Rendezvous
- Alexander Palm (1822–1885), poet, novelist and playwright, Petrashevsky Circle member, Alexey Slobodin
- Liodor Palmin (1841–1891), poet, translator and journalist
- Ivan Panaev (1812–1862), writer, critic and publisher/editor of Sovremennik magazine
- Avdotya Panaeva (1820–1893), novelist, short story writer and memoirist
- Vera Panova (1905–1973), novelist, short story writer, journalist and playwright, Seryozha
- Valentin Parnakh (1891–1951), poet, translator, choreographer and musician, founder of Russian jazz music
- Sophia Parnok (1885–1933), poet, playwright and translator
- Andrei Parshev (born 1955), political writer
- Boris Pasternak (1890–1960), poet and novelist, not permitted by the Soviet Union to accept the Nobel Prize, Doctor Zhivago
- Pyotr Patrushev (1942–2016), writer and dissident
- Konstantin Paustovsky (1892–1968), writer, Nobel Prize nominee, Story of a Life
- Pyotr Pavlenko (1899–1951), writer, Happiness
- Oleg Pavlov (1970–2018), novelist and short story writer
- Karolina Pavlova (1807–1893), poet and novelist, A Double Life
- Vladimir Pecherin (1807–1885), poet and writer, Notes from Beyond the Tomb
- Victor Pelevin (born 1962), modern writer, Omon Ra
- Yakov Perelman (1882–1942), science writer, Physics for Entertainment
- Sergei Perevezentsev (born 1960), political science writer
- Pyotr Pertsov (1868–1947), publisher, editor, literary critic, journalist and memoirist
- Nick Perumov (born 1963), fantasy and science fiction writer
- Pyotr Petrov (1827–1891), writer, arts historian, genealogist and bibliographer, The Tsar's Judgement
- Mariya Petrovykh (1908–1979), poet and translator
- Lyudmila Petrushevskaya (born 1938), modern writer and playwright, The Time: Night
- Valentin Pikul (1928–1990), novelist, At the Last Frontier
- Boris Pilnyak (1894–1938), novelist, The Naked Year
- Dmitry Pisarev (1840–1868), critic and publicist
- Aleksey Pisemsky (1821–1881), novelist and dramatist, A Bitter Fate
- Andrei Platonov (1899–1951), novelist, short story writer and playwright, Chevengur, The Foundation Pit
- Georgi Plekhanov (1857–1918), writer, revolutionary and Marxist theoretician
- Aleksey Pleshcheyev (1825–1893), radical poet, Step Forward! Without Fear or Doubt
- Pyotr Pletnyov (1792–1866), poet, dedicatee of Pushkin's Eugene Onegin
- Mikhail Pogodin (1800–1875), historian and journalist
- Nikolai Pogodin (1900–1962), playwright, journalist and magazine editor
- Antony Pogorelsky (1787–1837), fantasy fiction writer, Dvoinik
- Evgeny Pogozhev (1870–1931), religious writer, essayist and journalist (pen name E. Poselyanin)
- Konstantin Podrevsky (1888–1930), poet, translator, lyricist, Dorogoi dlinnoyu
- Boris Polevoy (1908–1981), writer and journalist, The Story of a Real Man
- Ksenofont Polevoy (1801–1867), writer, literary critic, journalist, publisher and translator
- Nikolai Polevoy (1796–1846), writer, historian and magazine editor, The Moscow Telegraph
- Pyotr Polevoy (1839–1902), writer, playwright, translator, critic and literary historian
- Alexander Polezhayev (1804–1838), satirical poet, Sashka
- Elizaveta Polonskaya (1890–1969), poet, translator, and journalist, the only female member of the Serapion Brothers
- Leonid Polonsky (1833–1913), writer, journalist, editor and publisher, Mad Musician
- Yakov Polonsky (1819–1898), poet, Georgian Night
- Nikolay Pomyalovsky (1835–1863), novelist and short story writer, Seminary Sketches
- Mikhail Popov (1742–1790), writer, poet, dramatist and opera librettist, Anyuta
- Nikolay Popovsky (1730–1760), poet and translator
- Vasili Popugaev (1778/79–1816), poet, novelist and translator
- Oleg Postnov (born 1962), novelist and translator
- Ignaty Potapenko (1856–1929), writer and playwright, A Russian Priest
- Michael Prawdin (1894–1970), historical writer
- Alexander Preys (1905–1942), playwright and librettist, The Nose
- Dmitri Prigov (1940–2007), writer and artist, Live in Moscow
- Zakhar Prilepin (born 1975), writer and dissident, member of the National Bolshevik Party
- Maria Prilezhayeva (1903–1989), children's writer, The Life of Lenin
- Mikhail Prishvin (1873–1954), journalist and writer
- Valentyn Prodaievych (born 1960), journalist and writer, lives in Florida
- Alexander Prokhanov (born 1938), writer and newspaper editor, Empire's Last Soldier
- Alexander Prokofyev (1900–1971), poet and war correspondent
- Iosif Prut (1900–1996), playwright and screenwriter
- Kozma Prutkov (1803–1863), satirist, pseudonym of Aleksey Konstantinovich Tolstoy and his cousins
- Alexander Pushkin (1799–1837), poet, novelist and dramatist, Eugene Onegin
- Vasily Pushkin (1766–1830), poet, uncle of Alexander Pushkin
- Konstantin Pyatnitsky (1864–1938), journalist, publisher and memoirist

== R ==
- Alexander Radishchev (1749–1802), radical writer and social critic, Journey from St. Petersburg to Moscow
- Edvard Radzinsky (born 1936), writer, playwright, TV personality, screenwriter and historian
- Vladimir Rayevsky (1795–1872), poet and Decembrist
- Valentin Rasputin (1937–2015), novelist, Farewell to Matyora
- Irina Ratushinskaya (1954–2017) dissident poet and writer, Grey is the Color of Hope
- Razumnik Ivanov-Razumnik (1878–1946), writer, philosopher and literary critic
- Yevgeny Rein (born 1935), poet and writer, The Names of Bridges
- Vera Reznik (born 1944), writer, translator and literary scholar
- Aleksey Remizov (1877–1957), modernist writer, calligrapher and folklore enthusiast, The Clock, Sisters of the Cross
- Fyodor Reshetnikov (1841–1871), novelist, The Podlipnayans
- Mikhail Rosenheim (1820–1887), poet, editor, publicist and translator
- Robert Rozhdestvensky (1932–1994), poet, Flags of Spring
- Helena Roerich (1879–1949), philosopher, writer and public figure
- Nicholas Roerich (1874–1947), painter, philosopher, scientist, writer, traveler and public figure
- Konstantin Romanov (1858–1915), poet and playwright, The King of the Jews
- Panteleimon Romanov (1884–1938), writer, Without Bird-Cherry Blossoms
- Mikhail Roshchin (1933–2010), playwright, screenwriter and short story writer
- Yevdokiya Rostopchina (1811–1858), poet and writer, Forced Marriage
- Vasily Rozanov (1856–1919), writer and philosopher
- Robert Rozhdestvensky (1932–1994), poet, Flags of Spring
- Dina Rubina (born 1953), novelist and short story writer, The Blackthorn
- Anatoly Rybakov (1911–1998), novelist, Children of the Arbat
- Vladimir Rybakov (1947–2018), novelist and journalist, The Afghans: A Novella of Soviet Soldiers in Afghanistan
- Vyacheslav Rybakov (born 1954), science fiction author and orientalist, The Trial Sphere
- Maria Rybakova (born 1973), novelist and short story writer
- Pavel Rybnikov (1831–1885), ethnographer, folklorist and literary historian
- Kondraty Ryleyev (1795–1826), poet, publisher and a leader of the Decembrist Revolt
- Yuri Rytkheu (1930–2008), Chukchi writer, A Dream in Polar Fog

== S ==
- Irina Saburova (1907–1979), writer, poet, translator, and magazine editor
- Dmitry Sadovnikov (1847–1883), poet, folklorist and ethnographer, "Iz-za ostrova na strezhen"
- Boris Sadovskoy (1881–1952), poet, writer and literary critic
- German Sadulaev (born 1973), Chechen writer, I am a Chechen!
- Evgeny Salias De Tournemire (1840–1908), writer, The Krutoyar Princess
- Ilya Salov (1834–1902), writer, playwright and translator, Butuzka
- Yuri Samarin (1819–1876), publicist and critic
- Vladimir Sanin (1928–1989), writer of travel fiction
- Genrikh Sapgir (1928–1999), poet and novelist
- Mikhail Saltykov-Shchedrin (1826–1889), novelist, short story writer, playwright and essayist, The History of a Town, The Golovlyov Family
- Boris Savinkov (1879–1925), writer and revolutionary terrorist, What Never Happened
- Feodosy Savinov (1865–1915), poet, Rodnoye
- Ilya Selvinsky (1899–1968), poet, leader of the constructivist school
- Sergey Semyonov (1868–1922), peasant writer, Gluttons
- Yulian Semyonov (1931–1993), writer of spy fiction and crime fiction, Seventeen Instants of Spring
- Osip Senkovsky (1800–1858), Polish-Russian orientalist, journalist, writer and entertainer.
- Alexander Serafimovich (1863–1949), writer, The Iron Flood
- Andrey Sergeev (1933–1998), poet, translator and writer
- Sergei Sergeyev-Tsensky (1875–1958), writer and academician, Brusilov's Breakthrough
- Efraim Sevela (1928–2010), writer, screenwriter, director and producer
- Igor Severyanin (1887–1941), ego futurist poet, The Cup of Thunder
- Marietta Shaginyan (1888–1982), writer of Armenian descent, Mess-Mend
- Alexander Shakhovskoy (1777–1846) playwright, writer, poet, librettist and critic, The New Stern
- Varlam Shalamov (1907–1982), short story writer and poet, Kolyma Tales
- Olga Shapir (1850–1916), writer and feminist, The Settlement
- Pyotr Shchebalsky (1810–1886), critic, editor and literary historian
- Tatiana Shchepkina-Kupernik (1874–1952), poet, writer, playwright and translator, Deborah
- Vladimir Shchiglev (1840–1903), satirical poet and playwright
- Stepan Shchipachev (1889–1980), poet, Lines of Love
- Vadim Shefner (1915–2002), poet and writer
- Alexander Sheller (1838–1900), writer, poet and essayist, Putrid Moors
- Nikolay Sherbina (1821–1869), poet, To the Sea
- Vadim Shershenevich (1893–1942), futurist poet, writer and screenwriter, A Kiss From Mary Pickford
- Stepan Shevyryov (1806–1864), poet, writer, critic and philologist
- Mikhail Shishkin (born 1961), modern writer, The Taking of Izmail
- Vyacheslav Shishkov (1873–1945), writer, known for his descriptions of Siberia
- Maria Shkapskaya (1891–1952), poet and journalist
- Ivan Shmelyov (1873–1950), novelist, The Sun of the Dead
- Mikhail Sholokhov (1905–1984), Nobel Prize–winning writer, And Quiet Flows the Don
- Gennady Shpalikov (1937–1974), poet and screenwriter, I Step Through Moscow
- Nikolai Shpanov (1896–1961), author
- Vasily Shukshin (1929–1974), actor, writer, screenwriter and movie director, Roubles in Words, Kopeks in Figures
- Pavel Shumil (born 1957), science fiction author
- Evgeny Shvarts (1896–1958), writer, playwright and screenwriter, The Dragon
- Konstantin Simonov (1915–1979), novelist and poet, "Wait for Me"
- Andrei Sinyavsky (1925–1997), writer, publisher and dissident, Fantastic Stories
- Alexander Skabichevsky (1838–1911), writer and literary critic
- Stepan Skitalets (1869–1941), poet and writer, The Love of a Scene Painter
- Tim Skorenko (born 1983), writer, poet, singer-songwriter, and journalist.
- Victor Skumin (born 1948), writer and magazine editor
- Olga Slavnikova (born 1957), novelist and literary critic
- Vasily Sleptsov (1836–1878), novelist, short story writer and playwright, Hard Times, "The Ward"
- Konstantin Sluchevsky (1837–1904), poet and magazine editor
- Boris Slutsky (1919–1986), representative of the War generation of Russian poets
- Nikolai Snessarev (1856–1928), publicist, writer, literary critic and politician
- Sofia Soboleva (1840–1884), writer and journalist, Pros and Cons
- Anatoly Sofronov (1911–1990), writer, poet, playwright, scriptwriter, editor and literary administrator, The Cookie
- Sasha Sokolov (born 1943), novelist, A School for Fools
- Ivan Sokolov-Mikitov (1882–1975), author, journalist and short-story writer, Childhood
- Vladimir Sollogub (1813–1882), writer and poet, The Snowstorm
- Fyodor Sologub (1863–1927), symbolist poet, playwright and novelist, The Petty Demon
- Vladimir Soloukhin (1924–1997), writer, journalist and poet, Verdict
- Leonid Solovyov (1906–1962), writer and playwright, Tale of Hodja Nasreddin
- Vladimir Solovyov (1853–1900), philosopher, poet, pamphleteer and literary critic
- Aleksandr Solzhenitsyn (1918–2008), Nobel Prize–winning writer, One Day in the Life of Ivan Denisovich, The Gulag Archipelago
- Orest Somov (1793–1833), writer, journalist, literary critic and translator, Mommy and Sonny
- Vladimir Sorokin (born 1955), popular postmodern writer and dramatist
- Konstantin Staniukovich (1843–1903), sea stories writer, Maximka
- Mikhail Stasyulevich (1826–1911), writer, literary historian, editor and publisher
- Vladimir Stavsky (1900–1943), writer, editor and literary administrator, Fighting for Motherland
- Alexander Stein (1906–1993), writer, playwright, scriptwriter and memoirist
- Ksenya Stepanycheva (born 1978), playwright, Pink Bow
- Sergey Stepnyak-Kravchinsky (1851–1895), writer, publicist and revolutionary, King Stork and King Log
- Fyodor Stepun (1884–1965), Russian-German writer, philosopher, historian and sociologist
- Dmitry Strelnikov (born 1969), poet, essayist and novelist
- Arkady and Boris Strugatsky (Arkady 1925–1991) (Boris 1933–2012), science fiction writers, Hard to Be a God
- Aleksandr Sukhovo-Kobylin (1817–1903), playwright, Scenes from the Past
- Alexander Sumarokov (1717–1777), early poet and playwright
- Ivan Surikov (1841–1880), peasant poet
- Alexey Surkov (1899–1983), poet, editor, literary critic, "Zemlyanka"
- Mikhail Sushkov (1775–1792), writer, The Russian Werther
- Alexei Suvorin (1834–1912), publisher and journalist
- Viktor Suvorov (born 1947), writer and historian
- Fyodor Svarovsky (born 1971), poet
- Mikhail Svetlov (1903–1964), poet and journalist, Song of Kakhovka

== T ==
- Yelizaveta Tarakhovskaya (1891–1968), poet, playwright, translator and children's writer
- Alexander Tarasov-Rodionov (1885–1938), writer, Chocolate
- Arseny Tarkovsky (1907–1989), poet and translator
- Valery Tarsis (1906–1983), novelist and dissident, Ward 7
- Nadezhda Teffi (1872–1952), humorist writer, All About Love
- Nikolay Teleshov (1867–1957), writer and memoirist, organizer of the Moscow Sreda
- Vladimir Tendryakov (1923–1984), novelist and short story writer, Three, Seven, Ace
- Yuri Terapiano (1892–1980), poet, writer, translator, literary critic and historian
- Sergey Terpigorev (1841–1895), writer and essayist
- Nikolai Tikhonov (1896–1979), writer and poet, member of the Serapion Brothers
- Vladislav Titov (1934–1987), novelist who lost both arms in a coal mine accident, Defying Death
- Pyotr Tkachev (1844–1886), publicist, writer and critic
- Viktoriya Tokareva (born 1937), screenwriter and short story writer
- Aleksey Konstantinovich Tolstoy (1817–1875), poet, dramatist and novelist, The Death of Ivan the Terrible
- Aleksey Nikolayevich Tolstoy (1882–1945), novelist and science fiction writer, The Garin Death Ray
- Ilya Tolstoy (1866–1933), author of a memoir about his father Leo Tolstoy
- Leo Tolstoy (1828–1910) novelist, short story writer, playwright, essayist and public figure, War and Peace, Anna Karenina, The Death of Ivan Ilyich, Resurrection, Hadji Murat
- Tatyana Tolstaya (born 1951), writer, TV host, publicist, novelist and essayist
- Edward Topol (born 1938), novelist and journalist, Red Square
- Sergey Trakhimenok (born 1950), novelist, playwrights, screenwriter and short story writer, detective story writer
- Vasily Trediakovsky (1703–1768), poet, essayist and playwright
- Konstantin Trenyov (1876–1945), playwright and short story writer, Lyubov Yarovaya
- Sergei Tretyakov (1892–1937), playwright, I Want a Baby
- Yury Trifonov (1925–1981), novelist and short story writer, The House on the Embankment
- Gavriil Troyepolsky (1905–1995), novelist, White Bim Black Ear
- Mikhail Tsetlin (1882–1945), poet, playwright, novelist, memoirist and translator
- Marina Tsvetaeva (1892–1941), poet and essayist, The Rat-Catcher
- Alexei Tsvetkov (born 1947), poet, novelist and journalist
- Nikolai Tsyganov (1797–1832), poet, folklorist, singer and actor, Russian Songs
- Evgenia Tur (1815–1892), writer, critic, journalist and publisher, Antonina
- Sergey Turbin (1821–1884), playwright and journalist
- Ivan Turgenev (1818–1883), novelist and playwright, A Sportsman's Sketches, Home of the Gentry, Fathers and Sons
- Veronika Tushnova (1911–1965), poet and translator, Memory of the Heart
- Aleksandr Tvardovsky (1910–1971), poet, war correspondent and editor of Novy Mir, Vasily Terkin
- Yury Tynyanov (1894–1943), writer, literary critic, translator, scholar and screenwriter
- Fyodor Tyutchev (1803–1873), poet, The Last Love

== U ==
- Vladimir Uflyand (1937–2007), poet, The Working Week Comes To An End
- Pavel Ulitin (1918–1986), writer
- Lyudmila Ulitskaya (born 1943), novelist and short-story writer, Medea and Her Children
- Alexander Urusov (1843–1900), literary critic, translator, lawyer and philanthropist
- Eduard Uspensky (1937–2018), children's writer, Cheburashka series
- Gleb Uspensky (1843–1902), novelist, short story writer and essayist, The Power of the Land
- Nikolay Uspensky (1837–1889), short story writer, A Good Existence
- Iosif Utkin (1903–1944), poet and journalist, Dear Childhood

== V ==
- Konstantin Vaginov (1899–1934), poet and novelist, Goat Song, The Works and Days of Svistonov
- Pyotr Valuyev (1815–1890), statesman, novelist, poet and essayist
- Alexander Vampilov (1937–1972), playwright, Elder Son
- Mikhail Veller (born 1948), writer and journalist, The Guru
- Alexander Veltman (1800–1870), writer, one of the pioneers of Russian science fiction
- Dmitry Venevitinov (1805–1827), philosophical poet
- Anastasiya Verbitskaya (1861–1928), novelist, playwright, screenplay writer, publisher and feminist, The Keys to Happiness
- Vikenty Veresaev (1867–1945), writer and medical doctor, Memoirs of a Physician
- Lidia Veselitskaya (1857–1936), writer, translator and memoirist, Mimi's Marriage
- Sergey Vikulov (1922–2006), poet, essayist, memoirist and editor, Nash Sovremennik
- Tony Vilgotsky (born 1980), horror and fantasy writer, columnist
- Nikolai Virta (1906–1976), writer and playwright, Alone
- Vsevolod Vishnevsky (1900–1951), playwright, Optimistic Tragedy
- Igor Vishnevetsky (born 1964), poet and music historian
- Georgi Vladimov (1931–2003), dissident writer, Faithful Ruslan
- Dmitry Vodennikov (born 1968), poet and essayist
- Vladimir Voinovich (1932–2018), satirical novelist, The Life and Extraordinary Adventures of Private Ivan Chonkin
- Zinaida Volkonskaya (1792–1862), writer, poet, singer, composer, salonist and lady in waiting
- Alexander Volkov (1891–1977), novelist and mathematician, The Wizard of the Emerald City
- Anri Volokhonsky (1936–2017), poet and translator
- Maximilian Voloshin (1877–1932), poet, translator, art and literary critic
- Konstantin Vorobyov (1919–1975), writer, Slain Near Moscow
- Vatslav Vorovsky (1871–1923), Marxist revolutionary, literary critic, diplomat and publicist
- Julia Voznesenskaya (1940–2015), novelist, The Women's Decameron
- Zoya Voskresenskaya (1907–1992), children's writer, diplomat, NKVD foreign office secret agent, Mother's Heart
- Andrei Voznesensky (1933–2010), poet and writer, First Frost
- Alexander Vvedensky (1904–1941), poet, co-founder of OBERIU
- Arseny Vvedensky (1844–1909), writer, journalist, literary critic and historian
- Pyotr Vyazemsky (1792–1878), poet, representative of the Golden Age of Russian poetry
- Vladimir Vysotsky (1938–1980), singer, songwriter, poet and actor

== Y ==
- Alexander Yakovlev (1886–1953), writer and essayist, The Peasant
- Pyotr Yakubovich (1860–1911), poet and writer, member of Narodnaya Volya
- Pavel Yakushkin (1822–1872), writer, ethnographer and folklorist
- Alexander Yashin (1913–1968), writer associated with the Village Prose movement
- Ieronim Yasinsky (1850–1931), novelist, poet, essayist and memoirist
- Nikolay Yazykov (1803–1846), poet and slavophile
- Ivan Yefremov (1908–1972), paleontologist, science fiction author and social thinker, Andromeda
- Dmitri Yemets (born 1974), author of fantasy literature for children and young adults, Tanya Grotter
- Venedikt Yerofeyev (1938–1990), writer and playwright, Moscow-Petushki
- Pyotr Yershov (1815–1869), fairy tale writer, poet and playwright, The Humpbacked Horse
- Sergei Yesenin (1895–1925), poet, Land of Scoundrels
- Tatyana Yesenina (1918–1992), writer and daughter of Sergei Yesenin, Zhenya, the Wonder of the Twentieth Century
- Yevgeny Yevtushenko (1933–2017), poet, novelist, essayist, dramatist, screenwriter, actor, editor, and film director
- Semyon Yushkevich (1868–1927), writer and playwright

== Z ==
- Nikolay Zabolotsky (1903–1958), poet, children's writer and translator, one of the founders of the absurdist group OBERIU
- Boris Zakhoder (1918–2000), poet, children's writer and translator
- Mikhail Zagoskin (1789–1852), historical novelist, Tales of Three Centuries
- Boris Zaitsev (1881–1972), writer and playwright, Anna
- Mark Zakharov (1933–2019), theatrical director, playwright and actor
- Sergey Zalygin (1913–2000), novelist and magazine editor, The South American Variant
- Yevgeny Zamyatin (1884–1937), novelist, short story writer and playwright, We
- Vsevolod Zelchenko (born 1972), poet
- Mikhail Zenkevich (1886–1973), poet and translator, Wild Porphyry
- Yulia Zhadovskaya (1824–1883), poet and writer, Apart from the Great World
- Vera Zhelikhovsky (1835–1896), novelist and children's writer, The General's Will
- Aleksey Zhemchuzhnikov (1821–1908), poet and dramatist, co-creator of Kozma Prutkov
- Boris Zhitkov (1882–1938), novelist, short story writer, playwright and children's writer, Viktor Vavich
- Maria Zhukova (1804–1855), writer, Evenings on the Karpovka
- Vasily Zhukovsky (1783–1852), poet, translator and magazine editor
- Zinovy Zinik (born 1945), novelist and broadcaster, The Mushroom-Picker
- Lydia Zinovieva-Annibal (1866–1907), writer and playwright, The Tragic Menagerie
- Nikolai Zlatovratsky (1845–1911), novelist and short story writer, Old Shadows
- Mikhail Znamensky (1833–1892), writer, memoirist, caricaturist, archeologist and ethnographer, The Vanished Men
- Mikhail Zoshchenko (1895–1958), satirical short story writer and novelist, The Galosh
- Rafail Zotov (1795–1871), playwright, novelist, journalist, translator and theatre critic, Jealous Wife

== See also ==
- List of Russian artists
- List of Russian architects
- List of Russian inventors
- List of Russian explorers
- Russian culture
