= Strelnikov =

Strelnikov (Стрельников) is a surname of Russian origin. It may refer to:

- Aleksandr Strelnikov (born 1947), Russian politician
- Dmitry Strelnikov (born 1969), Russian writer, biologist and journalist
- Ivan Strelnikov (1939–1969), Russian border guard hero of the USSR
- Nikolay Strelnikov (1888–1939), Russian composer
- Vasily Strelnikov (born 1962), Russian-American VJ
- Vladimir Strelnikov (born 1939), Ukrainian artist
- Pasha Antipov "Strelnikov", a fictional Russian revolutionary of the novel and film Doctor Zhivago
