= Nikolai Khmelnitsky =

Russian dramatist, literary critic and translator

Nikolai Ivanovich Khmelnitsky
- Born: Николай Иванович Хмельницкий; 22 August 1789; Saint Petersburg, Russian Empire
- Died: 20 September 1845 (aged 56); Saint Petersburg, Russian Empire
- Occupations: dramatist, translator, critic, state official
- Years active: 1806 – 1840s

Nikolai Ivanovich Khmelnitsky (Russian: Никола́й Ива́нович Хмельни́цкий, 22 [o.s. 11] August 1789, Saint Petersburg, Russian Empire, - 20 [o.s. 8] September 1845, Saint Petersburg, Russian Empire) was a Russian dramatist, literary critic and translator. In 1812-1814, as an army officer, he was Mikhail Kutuzov's adjutant, and later, in 1829-1838, served as a governor of Smolensk. Khmelnitsky's chosen genre was the saloon comedy, and many prominent authors, Alexander Pushkin among them, valued him as an influential figure in the Russian literary scene of the 1820s.

== Biography ==
Nikolai Ivanovich Khmelnitsky was born in Saint Peterburg, a son of Ivan Parfyonovich Khmelnitsky, a doctor of philosophy at the University of Königsberg. His uncle Nikolai Emin, also a writer, did a lot to provide the boy with high quality primary education. After graduating the Mining Cadet corps in 1804 he joined the Russia’s Foreign ministry.

As the 1812 War broke out, Khmelnitsky joined the Russian army and at one time served as Mikhail Kutuzov’s adjutant. He took part in several 1813-1814 campaigns and was among the Russian troops that entered Paris. After the War he became the head of Saint Petersburg’s military governor General Miloradovich's chancellery.

By the early 1820s Khmelnitsky was already a well-known playwright whose works were produced by several Russian theatres. His first success, Govorun (The Chatterbox, 1817), a re-make of Louis de Boissy's comedy, is considered "one of the finest Russian saloon comedies," according to biographer K.Rogov. Khmelnitsky's vaudevillian operas (The Quarantin, 1820; Actors Among Themselves or Actress Troyepolskaya's Debut, 1821; The Newest Prank or the Theatre Battle, 1822) were praised as a successful attempt to create the new, Russian flank of the genre.

In 1829 Khmelnitsky was appointed the Smolensk Governor and made himself the reputation of a liberal official. In 1838, though, he was arrested, accused of embezzlement, and spent a year (1838-1839) in the Peter and Paul Fortress. In 1843 Kmelnitsky was acquitted, but, according to K.Borozdin, the shock of the imprisonment proved too much for him and he "became unrecognizable."

In 1844 Khmelnitsky went abroad, having professed his disillusionment with the state of the Russian drama, but soon returned due to deteriorated health. Several historical comedies he wrote in 1840s (The Tsar's Word or Rumyantsev's Marriage, Zinovy Bogdanovich Khmelnitsky or The Joining of Malorossiya, The Russian Faust or Bryusov Cabinet) were published after his death in 1845. The collection of his major works (The Theatre of Nikolai Khmelnitsky, in 2 volumes, Saint Petersburg, 1829-1830) was re-issued in 1849.
