= Valentyn Prodaievych =

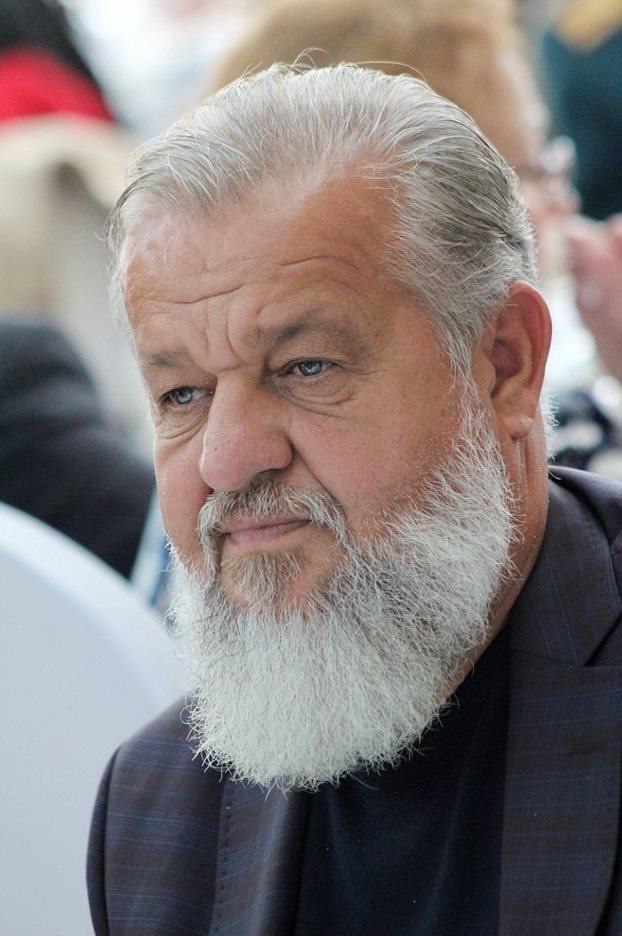
Prodaievych Valentyn

Valentyn Prodaievych (Ukrainian: Валентин Олександрович Продаєвич; born January 11, 1960, in Ovidiopol, U.S.S.R), is a Ukrainian public figure, politician, lawyer, journalist and writer. He was Chairman of the Economic Court of Odesa region from July 15, 2002 till October 2011. He is the founder of the all-Ukrainian patriotic portal Ukridea. Valentin Prodaievych is an author of several books dedicated to the history of Ukrainian town Odesa and has made notable historical contributions to a number of publications where he investigates the complex history of the legendary city.

Prodajevitch offers new insights to the reader's perception of their beloved Odesa in the two-volume book Legends and True Stories of Alexander Park that he cowrote with Aleksandr Surilov. While written in a literary and a detective style, the book takes the reader through significant historical events of the city as well as its familiar landmarks. The author has collaborated on a historical illustrated album "Bombardment of Odesa in 1854" which is dedicated to the events of the Eastern Crimean War, highlighting the attack of the Anglo-French Armada on the Russian port of Odesa.

== Education ==
Prodaievych gained the qualifications to practice law after studying at the Odesa I.I Mechnikov National University, from 1978 to 1983. He later earned a master's degree in Public Governance, specializing in Law, at the same institution.

In 2007, he defended the Candidate's thesis in Jurisprudence. Specialty: Theory of Management, Administrative Law and Process; Financial Law; Information Law. Topic "Place of Administrative Responsibility in the System of Administrative and Law Enforcement Measures".

He graduated from the Seminary at Holy Dormition, Kyiv Pechersk Lavra, in 2010.

== Career ==
Prodaievych graduated from Ovidiopol secondary school in 1977 and started his labor activities as the Locksmith at Ovidiopol Combine of Municipal Enterprises. After graduating from Odesa I.I. Mechnikov State University he worked as an Investigator for the Department of Internal Affairs of Odesa by assignment during a period 1983 to 1987.

- 1987 to 1988 – Engineer at ATP-25102 in Odesa.
- 1988 to 1993 – Lawyer at Inkom Small Private Enterprise of Odesa Factory of Nonwoven Materials.
- 1993 to 1997 – Head of Legal Department at Inkom Trans Service Joint Venture in Odesa.
- 1997 to 1998 – Director of Delta LLC in Odesa.
- In 1998 he was appointed to the position of the judge at the arbitration court of Odesa Oblast.

The Chairman of the Economic Court of Odesa region from 15.07.2002 to October 2011.

== Public activities ==
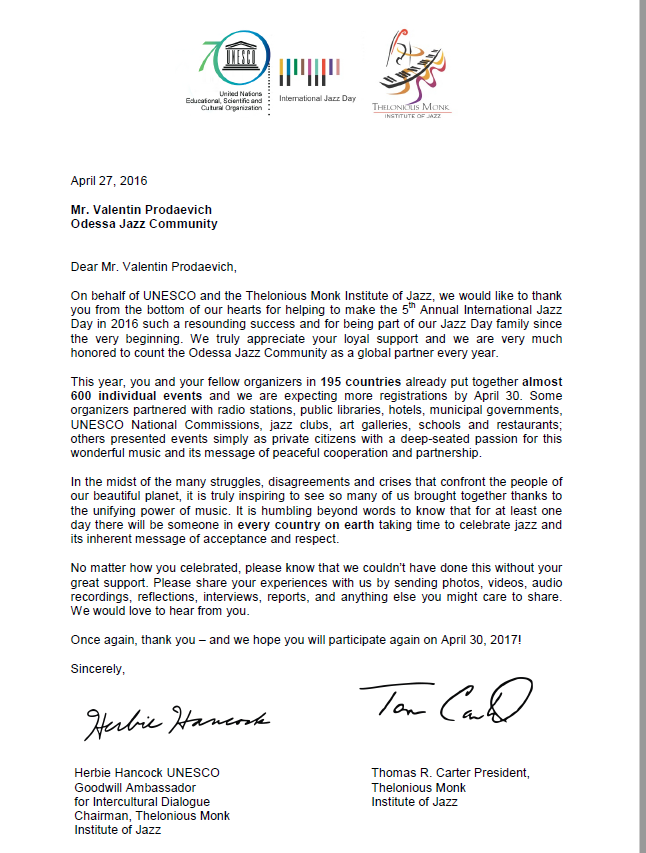
Thank you letter Valentyn Prodievych from UNESCO

In 1994, he was elected as a member of the Suvorovskyi District Council of Odesa. Effective 2015, he is a member of the National Union of Journalists of Ukraine. Currently he is the Editor of Public Control newspaper and Chairman of the Public Constitution Public Organization.

In 2016 (28 April), with the support of the United Nations Educational, Scientific and Cultural Organization (UNESCO) the Odesa Academic Theatre of Musical Comedy named after M. Vodyanoy hosted the concert "Dzhaziotatsiia "Ъ", where V.A. Prodaievych was a patron and organizer of such concert. The following famous jazz performers took part in the concert: Nelly Manukyan (flute, Armenia, George Stavrolakis (timpani, Greece), Myroslav Piatnykov (trumpet), Oleh Subbotyn (saxophone), Alexis Tcholakian (piano, France), Stanislav Zilberman (percussion, Israel), Oleksii Petukhov (piano), Volodymyr Leonov (percussion), Serhii Terentiev (piano), Yevhen Khandyshko (trombone), Maksym Kondratiev (double bass) and Volodymyr Vakulovych (trumpet).

Since 2016, he is a founder and one of the leading experts of the all-Ukrainian patriotic portal Ukridea.

From 2016, member of the Odesa-Richelie Rotary Club.

The organizer of all-Ukrainian and international projects of Odesa-Richelie Rotary Club.

From 2018, First Deputy Party Chairman of Ukrainian sea party.

From May 2019, mentor and lecturer at the Law College of the National University Odesa Law Academy.

From February 2022, Head of Ukrainian Cultural Center of Florida

February 23, 2022, Public speech at Interamerican Institute for Democracy, Miami

== Books ==
- Odesa Orthodox, in Events and Faces of Epochs Book I. Odesa:

Publishing house: VMV, 2010. ISBN 978-966-413-206-7

- Legends and True Stories of Alexander Park, Book I. Kyiv:

Published: Gorobets A.S., 2012. ISBN 978-966-8508-48-6

- Legends and True Stories of Alexander Park, Book II. Kyiv:

Publisher Ltd. "National ratings in Ukraine"., 2012. ISBN 978-966-1523-10-3

- Odesa by V.Vakhrenov, Book I.Odesa:

Publisher. "Falcon"., 2016. ISBN 978-617-7238-28-6

- Bombardment of Odesa in 1854. Odesa:

Publisher. "Falcon"., 2016. ISBN 978-617-7238-27-9

- My insomnia. Odesa:

Publisher. "Falcon"., 2018. ISBN 978-617-7238-54-5
