= Nikolai Snessarev =

Russian journalist, critic and politician (1856–1928)

Nikolai Vasilyevich Snessarev
- Born: Николай Васильевич Снессарев; January 26, 1856; Saint Petersburg, Russia
- Died: December 7, 1928 (aged 72); Berlin, Germany
- Occupations: Journalist; critic; writer; politician
- Years active: 1883–1928

Nikolai Vasilyevich Snessarev (Russian: Николай Васильевич Снессарев; January 26, 1856, Saint Petersburg, Russian Empire, — December 7, 1928, Berlin, Germany) was a Russian journalist, writer, literary critic (known also as N. S. and N. Snegov) and politician. During the 1910s, he was a member the Saint Petersburg City Duma. A prominent Novoye Vremya contributor and official (in 1887–1913), and later, in emigration, a supporter of Grand Duke Kirill Vladimirovich (he was the co-author, with Count Vladimir Bobrinsky, of the 1924 Manifest proclaiming Kirill an heir to the Russian throne), Snessarev's two major books, "The New Times Mirage" (1914) and "Kirill I, the Koburg Emperor" (1925), were satirizing both Novoye Vremya and the Grand Duke of Russia, whom he by now has got totally disillusioned with.
