= Nikolai Shpanov =

Russian writer (1896–1961)

Nikolai Shpanov (Russian: Никола́й Никола́евич Шпа́нов; 1896–1961) was a Russian political writer, who wrote Incendiaries, 1949, in which he described the lead-up of the Second World War.

== Bibliography ==
- The First Blow (Pervii Udar, 1939. Published before the signing of the Molotov–Ribbentrop Pact, it is a fictional account of the upcoming war between Third Reich and the Soviet Union. The Soviet Air Force stages a highly successful raid on industrial targets in Nuremberg. It was withdrawn from bookstores after the Molotov–Ribbentrop Pact on cooperation between the Soviet Union and the Nazi Germany was signed.)
- Incendiaries (Podzhigateli, 1949)
