= Sergey Ostrovoy =

Sergey Grigorievich Ostrovoy (Сергей Григорьевич Островой; b. September 6, 1911 - d. December 3, 2005) was a Soviet poet, known for writing the lyrics to the various popular songs during the Soviet period.

== Early life ==
Sergey Ostrovoy was born on September 6, 1911, in Novonikolaevsk, later renamed Novosibirsk, in a Jewish family. His father was a taiga prospector and a fur merchant, and disapproved of Sergey's literary interests.

After finishing 9th grade in school in 1929, Ostrovoy moved to Tomsk, where he worked as a reporter for the newspaper "Krasnoe Znamya" ("Red Banner"). Two years later he moved to Moscow. In Moscow he became a correspondent for the newspaper "Gudok" ("Horn") and traveled widely around the country.

== Literary career ==
While in Moscow, Ostrovoy participated in a competition for a military komsomol song where his poem "Nalivalis' topoli" ("Poplars were pouring") was picked by two composers and received two prizes.

After the competition, Ostrovoy was sent on a military journalistic assignment to the Far Eastern Military District of Russia, commanded by Vasily Blyukher. There Ostrovoy wrote a song "We won't give up the Soviet Primoriye" that caught the attention of Blyukher. At Blyukher's suggestion, Ostrovoy toured the Russian Far East as far as Sakhalin and wrote 12 songs in the process.

Ostrovoy's first essay was published in 1931, and his literary work was regularly published from 1934 onwards. Ostrovoy's first song lyrics collection "Na strazhe granitz" ("Guarding the borders") appeared in 1935.

In July 1941, shortly after the Nazi Germany invasion of the Soviet Union, Ostrovoy enlisted as a volunteer in the Red Army and was sent to the front. A year later he became a correspondent for the newspaper of the 31st Army "Na vraga" ("Against the enemy"). He was wounded near Staritsa and spent some time recovering in a hospital.

During the war Ostrovoy continued publishing poetry in various military newspapers, and a book of his poetry was published in 1944.

In the post-war period Ostrovoy became widely known as the author of lyrics for many popular songs in the Soviet Union.

Some of his well-known songs include “Blackbirds” ("Дрозды"), “Wait for the soldier” ("Жди солдата"), “How ships are escorted” ("Как провожают пароходы"), “Near the village of Kryukovo” ("У деревни Крюково"), “Heart song” ("Сердечная песенка"), “The song stays with a man” ("Песня остается с человеком"), “Ice ceiling, creaky door” ("Потолок ледяной, дверь скрипучая"), and others.

In 1969-1988 Ostrovoy was the chairman of the RSFSR federation of tennis.

Sergey Ostrovoy died on December 3, 2005, in Moscow.

== Personal life ==
Ostrovoy was married to Nadezhda Nikolaevna Tolstaya (born 1923, Petrograd), a noted harpist. The marriage, Ostrovoy's second, lasted over half a century; his wife Nadezhda was the only person to whom Ostrovoy ever dedicated his poetry.

== Honors and awards ==
- Maxim Gorky State Prize of RSFSR (1984)
