= Dmitry Strelnikov =

Russian-Polish writer, biologist and journalist

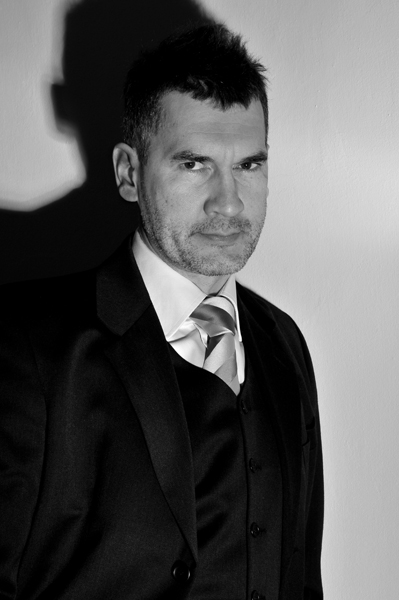
- Dmitry Strelnikov in 2010
- Born: 1969 (age 55–56) Alma-Ata, Kazakh SSR, Soviet Union
- Occupation: writer (poet, essayist, novelist), biologist and a journalist for television, radio and the press
- Genre: Realist

Website
- strelnikoff.net

Dmitry Aleksandrovich Strelnikov (Russian: Дмитрий Александрович Стрельников-Ананьин Семиреченский [full spelling]; born 1969) is a Russian-Polish writer, biologist and a journalist for television, radio and the press.

== Biography ==
Strelnikov was born in a Cossack city Alma-Ata in Kazakh SSR, Soviet Union ((today Kazakhstan) in 1969. He is a Cossack from the old Cossack family (a descendant of the Siberian Cossacks and the Cossacks of Jetisu). He lives in Poland. He is the graduate of The Correspondence Course of the Mathematic of the M.V. Lomonosov Moscow State University and of the Biology Department of the Warsaw University.

== Bibliography ==
- 2020 – "Глаза Тайги" ("Taiga's eyes"), a novel, Russia/Moscow, ЭКСМО / EKSMO Edition House.
- 2017 – "Polski Petersburg – rosyjska Warszawa. Powrót Heleny" ("Polish Petersburg – Russian Warsaw. Helen's return"), a novel, Poland/Wrocław, Atut Edition House.
- 2011 – "Fajnie być samcem!" ("It's fun being a male"), a novel, Poland/Warsaw, Iskry Edition House.
- 2011 – "Złote ryby" ("The Golden Fish"), a novel, Poland/Warsaw, W.A.B. Edition House
- 2010 – "Wyspa" ("Island"), a novel, Poland/Warsaw, W.A.B. Edition House
- 2009 – "Nikołaj i Bibigul" ("Nikolai and Bibigul"), a novel, Poland/Warsaw, W.A.B. Edition House
- 2008 – "Ruski miesiąc" ("Wedding.ru"), a novel, Poland/Warsaw, W.A.B. Edition House
- 2007 – "Nocne życie aniołów" ("The night life of the angels"), a collection of essays, Poland/Warsaw, Nowy Świat Edition House
- 2006–2007 – "Wielka Encyklopedia Zwierząt" ("A Great Encyclopedy of the Animals") in 30th volumes, Poland, Amer.Com SA with the cooperation with Oxford Educational Encyclopedia Ltd UK.
- 2004 – "Homo mirabilis", a poetry, Poland/Warsaw, Nowy Świat Edition House.
- His Russian language poems are published in the moscow's literary magazine "Знамя ".

== Discography ==
- 2005 – Российские барды, диск 5; Moroz Records, Moscow.

== Adaptations of Strelnikov's works ==
In August 2021 in Bydgoszcz, Poland, shooting for the full-length feature film "Negatyw" ('The Negative') began – the screening of Dmitry Strelnikov's novel "Wyspa" ('The Island'). The director was Robert Wichrowski, starring Anita Jancia and Michał Gadomski. The premiere of the film was scheduled for 2022.

In 2009–2010 on the basis of Strelnikov's bestseller "Ruski miesiąc" / "Russian month" ("Wedding.ru"), was produced a theatrical performance (directed by Giovanny Castellanos). The premiere of the play "Russian month" ("Wedding.ru") took place on 27 March 2010, at the Aleksander Sewruk Theater in Elbląg, Poland.

== See also ==
- Russian literature
- List of Russian writers
- TVP2
