= Short stories by the Strugatsky brothers =

Soviet-era science fiction writers

The Strugatsky brothers, Arkady and Boris, were Soviet-era writers best known for their science fiction novellas and novels who wrote about fifty short stories and other short-form works between 1955 and 1963. The first completed work by Arkady Strugatsky whose manuscript has survived is the short story How Kang Died, written in 1946. Boris Strugatsky's first literary experiments date to the mid-1950s. Around 1955, the brothers attempted to develop a technique for working together, resulting in the short story Sand Fever, which was only published in 1991. Subsequently, the Strugatsky brothers worked in parallel on major-form works (novellas and novels) and continued to write short stories, with the plot idea typically developed by one of the co-authors and joint work occurring at the final stage.

The first published short story, From Beyond, was written in 1957 and printed in 1958 in the magazine Tekhnika Molodezhi. Almost immediately, it was expanded into a novella in three stories, which appeared two years later. Some short-form works from the late 1950s formed the novel (also defined as a novella or cycle of stories) Noon: 22nd Century (1962). Certain stories, especially Six Matches, were popular, frequently reprinted, and translated into foreign languages.

By 1963, the co-author brothers, in their own words, realized that writing short stories was "no longer interesting" to them, and they never returned to the genre. Previously published short-form works were rarely and irregularly reprinted in the 1970s–1980s. In the 1990s–2000s, many archival texts not intended for publication or "rejected" by the co-authors appeared in collected works. Some sketches and plots were used in other their works; in the autobiographical novel Lame Fate, the writers' early stories are presented with extreme self-criticism and harsh self-irony. The history of the creation of most stories is described in Boris Strugatsky's Comments on the Past.

== Early works ==
=== Arkady Strugatsky's first literary experiments ===
According to B. N. Strugatsky's memories, his brother Arkady (eight years older) wrote a "jaw-breaking" science fiction novel titled Major Kovalev's Find in Leningrad before the start of the Great Patriotic War. The manuscript was handwritten in two school notebooks and was irretrievably lost during the Siege of Leningrad (according to another version, it was "torn up" by school friends). Arkady Strugatsky also tried composing poetry and even published a "literary magazine" at school — in the form of a notebook with illustrations by the author-publishers. These activities continued during his studies at the Military Institute of Foreign Languages of the Red Army after 1943 in Moscow.

==== How Kang Died ====
The earliest A. N. Strugatsky's preserved work is the short story How Kang Died. The manuscript is a homemade 14 sheets notebook, the text written in black ink and supplied with the author's illustrations. The story is dated May 29, 1946, a time when the 20-year-old cadet of the Military Institute of Foreign Languages, Arkady Strugatsky, was seconded to the Ministry of Internal Affairs of the Tatar ASSR in Kazan as a Japanese interpreter for the investigation in preparation for the Tokyo Trial. On April 27, 1946, A. N. Strugatsky wrote to his brother from Kazan that he was strongly impressed by A. Kazantsev's story "Взрыв" (Explosion), which prompted him,"using free moments, to dash off something similar". A. V. Snigirev suggested that the pretext was H. G. Wells' story The Sea Raiders.

The story remained in the writers' archive until 2001, when it was first published in the Stalker publishing house collected works. It was later reprinted and in 2010 released in a Czech language translation.

The text concerns a huge deep-sea predator — Kang (in Arkady Strugatsky's illustrations, it looks like an archaic reptile — something between a plesiosaur and an ichthyosaurus). An incomprehensible force, at the level of instinct, compels Kang to rise to the surface and intervene in the battle between a submarine and a destroyer. Kang damages the submarine but perishes from the destroyer's guns. The plot was apparently inspired by pre-war books about the underwater world (Secrets of the Deep Sea by William Beebe and Traces on stone by William Maxwell Reed) and inspired by the grim conditions of interrogations and detention of suspects. According to the biographer of the Strugatsky brothers Ant Skalandis, "...the story is very naive, student-like, but already quite well-made, literate, easy to read...". Its theme—"a rush for freedom, for light, beyond the hated gloomy world"—defined the Strugatskys' work for many decades afterward.

==== The First Ones ====
During his service as a divisional interpreter in Kamchatka, A. N. Strugatsky attempted to write a major science fiction novella. Traces of work on it remained in a "sketch" known as The First Ones. Later, the plot idea and text itself were used in The Land of Crimson Clouds. It concerned the crew of Soviet cosmonauts sent to Venus to reach the shores of Golkonda. Due to the death of the starship, the wounded Commander, Engineer, and Doctor, deprived of the possibility of return, decide to complete their expedition's task. Both handwritten versions were published in 2005 in the anthology The Unknown Strugatsky. The early, completed version in a separate notebook is dated March 1953. Its ending is grim but optimistic: although the crew perishes entirely, the story concludes with the phrase"The fortress fell, but the garrison won".

==== Creations of Youth ====
A folder under this title contained handwritten materials written by Arkady Strugatsky during his studies and service in Kamchatka. In addition to Arkady Natanovich's own works, the folder includes the beginning of a translation of R. Kipling's novella Stalky & Co. (three draft chapters and one and a half fair-copy chapters) and a translation of W. W. Jacobs' story The Tiger-Skin. The materials are very diverse—for example, in Arkady Strugatsky's correspondence from October 1952–1953, a plan emerges for a novella about a "new Tarzan" named Rumata. From February 1953 onward, ideas and notes appear for a large-scale artistic canvas about Venus, which later formed the basis of The Land of Crimson Clouds, including The First Ones.

Already at that time, A. Strugatsky demonstrated certain literary ambitions: the story Incident in the Guardroom about an attempt by saboteurs to break through the USSR border was sent to the Khabarovsk newspaper Suvorovsky Natisk, as mentioned in a letter dated September 6, 1953. The further events were described in the novel Lame Fate:

...I wanted so much to see my name in print, to feel myself being a writer, to display the brand of the favorite of the Muses and Apollo! And what bitter disappointment it was when Suvorovsky Natisk (God bless it), returned my manuscript under the polite pretext that Incident in the Guardroom is not typical for our army! Holy words.

The story was first published in the electronic version of the "Complete Collection of Works" (2015), after which it repeatedly appeared in collections of the Strugatskys' early work.

==== The Fourth Kingdom (On the Edge of the Possible) ====
The Fourth Kingdom (On the Edge of the Possible) is a science fiction novella by Arkady Strugatsky, written probably in spring–summer 1952 while he was on Kamchatka. According to Boris Strugatsky, the work on the novella was carried out by A. N. Strugatsky in spring–summer 1952 on Kamchatka. Only in 2015 did the keeper of the Strugatskys' archive, S. P. Bondarenko, discover the title page of the fair copy, on which the date "summer 1955" was written. In correspondence with his brother, The Fourth Kingdom is mentioned in a letter dated March 14, 1955. Traces of the initial conception are preserved in various letters; at that time the story was called The Blue Cloud of Akadzi. The text, divided into four short chapters, was written in the spirit of near-target science fiction. The main plot line revolves around the exposure of Japanese and American spies who are trying to smuggle samples of non-protein life out of the USSR — life that feeds on products of radioactive decay. The same fantastic premise was later used in the novella The Land of Crimson Clouds. The archive text was first published in the collected works Stalker (2001) and was reprinted in paperback in the series Worlds of the Strugatsky Brothers (2006). In 2015, a small print run of the only separate edition of the novella was released in Saransk. No special studies or literary-critical examinations of The Fourth Kingdom have been conducted.

Doctor of Cultural Studies A. B. Tanaseychuk (Ogarev Mordovia State University) noted the difficulties in genre classification of The Fourth Kingdom, which can be regarded both as a military adventure story and characterized as a spy thriller or detective story. The mixture of a fantastic premise with a patriotic tale about border guards was not original, but typical of Soviet science fiction of the Stalin era; Arkady Strugatsky was fully within the established tradition. At the same time, from Tanaseychuk's point of view, the text of The Fourth Kingdom is of high quality and in literary merits does not yield to — and sometimes even surpasses — the works of the then "masters" of the spy novel (N. Avtokratov, N. Shpanov, Yu. Dolgushin, S. Belyaev). The story features a well-developed intrigue, and the characters are quite vivid, humane, and sincere. "...What should a real Soviet commander be like? In the 1950s he could, of course, only be like Colonel Kryukov: 'servant to the Fatherland, father to the soldiers'. And the chief of the border outpost, Captain Nelyudin? Taciturn, dutiful, reliable, experienced, knowing his subordinates and caring for them. Can the enemies be anything else — vile spies plotting against our Soviet Motherland? Only like the cruel, mercenary, rather dim-witted and (necessarily!) cowardly American Charles Hill and the clever, amoral and (again necessarily!) perfidious war criminal Japanese Major Sunagawa". The sincere pathos of great achievements in practically the same forms was reproduced in the subsequent works of A. N. Strugatsky — Ashes of Bikini and The Land of Crimson Clouds. Biographers of the Strugatskys D. Volodikhin and G. Prashkevich, agreeing with the statement about the stylistic closeness of these works, considered The Fourth Kingdom a drawn-out "unpolished" novella, similar to analogous (and not the most successful) texts from the "Military Adventures" series.

Tanaseychuk called the central image of the novella — Captain Oleshko — a success of the young writer. He was probably modeled on Arkady Strugatsky himself: a tall, awkward Japanese-language interpreter who wore glasses and was not particularly suited to army life. He performs no heroic deeds; moreover, he is wounded, rather due to his own clumsiness, and "cracks" the spy almost by accident. That is, what elevates him above his comrades is only his intellect; otherwise he is full of complexes, because "he never took part in battles against the Germans or the Japanese, no one ever shot at him, and he saw enemies only as prisoners. This depressed him greatly, and he always felt shame and a kind of guilt before his comrades and superiors who had gone through the crucible of war." It is no coincidence that the setting is an island called Kunashu in the story. However, on the real Kunashir Senior Lieutenant Strugatsky never served; in November 1952 he was sent to Paramushir and Shumshu to deal with the aftermath of the earthquake and tsunami.

According to D. Volodikhin and G. Prashkevich, Arkady Strugatsky intended to publish The Fourth Kingdom and informed his brother Boris about it. Negotiations for printing the novella at Detgiz were conducted as early as spring 1957, but the further fate of the text is unclear. Arkady Natanovich actively pushed for the publication of Ashes of Bikini (a pamphlet-novella roughly similar in literary merit), while attempts to place The Fourth Kingdom quickly ceased. It is possible that the reason was that A. Strugatsky served in military intelligence in the Far East and could not promptly publish the text due to possible editorial doubts about the preservation of state secrets. "When the subscriptions 'melted away', different times came and a different person reread the text with different literary experience. In 1957 he made one more — rather feeble — attempt at luck, and later simply did not want to spoil his reputation by publishing utter simplicity from long-past days".

=== Boris Strugatsky's early literary experiments ===
The Strugatsky brothers, meeting occasionally during the elder brother's leaves, played a game set in an invented country called "Arcanar". The name was coined by Arkady. Bibliographer V. Borisov established that the name was derived from the elder Strugatsky's nickname "Ark" and the kingdom of Casinario from René Clair's film The Last Millionaire. Maps of this country, tables, and diagrams have survived, but from the preserved materials it is impossible to reconstruct what exactly this game entailed. Later, the brothers separately (in Leningrad and Kamchatka) began developing the idea of exchanging minds between living beings. In A. N. Strugatsky's archive, a 1953 sketch titled Salto Mortale has been preserved; its idea —influencing brain neurons— was used in 1960 in the short story Six Matches.

B. N. Strugatsky dated the beginning of his own creative work to the time when, in the 9th grade of school (in 1948 or 1949), he was assigned a free-topic composition, which turned into the short story Visko. The title referred to the English word "viscosity" — "viscosity, stickiness". Since Boris Strugatsky was fascinated during that period by H. G. Wells's The Island of Doctor Moreau (and had even copied the novel's text by hand: a friend wouldn't return the book), the plot revolved around an artificial creature named Visco, which rebels against its creator and destroys the laboratory. Following his elder brother's example, the manuscript was rewritten into a separate notebook and supplied with an illustration. "...For the free-topic composition I received, as I recall, an excellent grade and a stunned look from the literature teacher". However, in the mid-1950s, the author burned this text in the stove "in a fit of rightful self-abasement". The literary experiments continued after Arkady Strugatsky's discharge from military service in 1955.

=== First attempts of collaborative work ===
In interviews and private conversations over the years, Arkady and Boris Strugatsky stated that as early as 1954 they had decided to write a joint science fiction novella. Its title (The Land of Crimson Clouds) and main plot had already been conceived by Arkady while he was in Kamchatka. At the same time, a legend circulated that the work began as the result of a bet with A. N. Strugatsky's wife — Elena Ilinichna (née Oshanina). The literary identity of the Strugatsky brothers formed slowly and gradually. In August 1955, B. N. Strugatsky independently wrote a short story titled Lost in the Crowd — based on the plot of an alien mind taking possession of an ordinary citizen's body. Apparently, Boris did not show the manuscript to his brother. In 1957 he attempted to rewrite this story from the point of view of the "lost" person himself — resulting in the text Who Will Tell Us, Evidatte?, which received a harsh rebuke from Arkady. Nevertheless, the Strugatskys later used the plot idea for their most famous short story — Six Matches. Both stories were first published in 2001 in volume 11 of the Stalker publishing house collected works, were translated into Czech in 2010, and into German in 2012.

Boris Natanovich Strugatsky described the Strugatskys' creative method in his Comments on What Has Been Passed as follows:

The specificity of ABS ABS work, when any more or less serious text is necessarily created by the two of us together, simultaneously, word by word, paragraph by paragraph, page by page; when any sentence in the draft has several preceding variants proposed as alternatives, spoken aloud at some point but never written down; when the final text is a fusion of two —sometimes very different— conceptions of it, and not even a fusion but a kind of chemical compound at the molecular level — this specificity, among other things, produces two purely quantitative consequences.

First, the amount of paper in the archives is reduced to a minimum. Every novel exists in the archive in only one, at most two, drafts, each of which is in reality a written-down, edited, and compressed version of two-three-four ORAL drafts that were once spoken by the authors and polished during more or less fierce discussion. <...>

It is therefore not surprising that among the unpublished works of ABS only the stories remain that were written at one time by each of the co-authors individually and later deemed unsuitable for further joint work...

==== Sand Fever ====
The short story was written in 1955 in the bouts-rimés style of without any preliminary preparation and was to a large extent an impromptu. Boris Strugatsky remembers: "There was no preliminary discussion, no plan, not even a plot — one of the co-authors (I think it was BN) sat down at the typewriter and typed the first two pages; then the other one read what was written, scratched his ear, and typed another two; then again the first, and so on — until the very end. To the enormous astonishment of the authors, the result was something quite coherent, a kind of crimson-black picture, a fragment of an utterly alien, completely unknown life — something that reminded both of them of their beloved Jack London's story The Road of the False Suns.

At the center of the narrative are two men: Bob and the Viscount. In an undefined sandy landscape on another planet, they await the arrival of an astroplane that is supposed to take a certain valuable artifact — the "Golden Fleece" — back to Earth. However, when the astroplane arrives, its commander takes the Golden Fleece from them, then kills Bob and flies away, leaving the Viscount to certain death. After its creation, the story was almost not subjected to editing, with one exception: the formulation "...according to the laws of the Black Republic" was replaced with "...according to the laws of The Land of Crimson Clouds, that is, the novella on which the co-authors were intensively working at the time.

Since the story was conceived by the co-authors as an experimental attempt at joint creativity, it remained in the archive. The text first appeared in print in the Nizhny Tagil newspaper Uchitel on January 18, 1991, and was subsequently republished many times in various collected works.

=== Archival stories (the second half of the 1950s) ===
In the second half of the 1950s, Arkady and Boris Strugatsky attempted to pursue their literary ambitions separately. Between 1956 and 1958 (the manuscript is undated), B. N. Strugatsky wrote an experimental story titled The Return — something "unusually unusual", with a leaning toward mysticism and horror fiction. However, the text did not arouse the interest of the elder co-author and first appeared in print in 2001 in the collected works published by Stalker. In 2012, the story was translated into German.

In addition to completed works, the Strugatskys' archive preserves several unfinished texts, as well as finished but unpublished stories. S. Bondarenko conditionally classified them as "humorous sketches; [stories] that fit into the Noon Universe cycle; and 'strange' texts". The latter group includes The Improviser (1955), which forty years later was incorporated into the novel Search for Destiny or the Twenty Seventh Theorem of Ethics by S. Vititsky; the unfinished Without a Blindfold, thematically close to The Return; and the undated Dacha Incident, which in general outline resembles In Our Interesting Time. The unfinished story The Window, devoted to the first experiments with null-transportation, was written in the traditional stylistic manner of the Strugatskys of those years.

==== Narcissus ====
In 1957, A. N. Strugatsky wrote the story Narcissus — an attempt to"write something exquisite, mystical, 'refined and worldly', 'with a touch of aristocratic degeneration'". After joint discussion, the co-authors deemed the text unsuitable for further use. A retelling of the plot was included in the novel Lame Fate, where the story is also dated. It was first published in 2001 in the Stalker collected works and has been reprinted several times since.

The plot is based on the myth of Narcissus, but set in the mid-twentieth century and featuring a man with an extraordinary power of hypnotic suggestion. In the novel Lame Fate, the plot of the story is summarized as follows:

The point of this story is that <...> Shua du-Gyurzel, an aristocrat and hypnotist of extraordinary power, fell upon his own reflection in the mirror when"his gaze was full of desire, entreaty, imperious and tender command, a call to submission and love". And since "even Shua du-Gyurzel himself could not resist the will of Shua du-Gyurzel", the poor man fell madly in love with himself. Like Narcissus. A devilishly elegant and aristocratic story. There is also this passage: "Fortunately for him, after Narcissus there lived yet another shepherd Onan. So the count lives with himself, takes himself out into society and flirts with the ladies, probably arousing in himself a pleasant, exciting jealousy toward himself". Ai-yai-yai-yai-yai, what mannered, obscene, salon, plush kitsch!

==== Sober Mind ====
The archive preserves the humorous sketch Sober Mind — apparently dedicated to the"hounding" of science fiction in the 1960s; two handwritten versions survive, the first of which is unfinished and constitutes a draft of the second. The work was first published in 2005 in the series "The Unknown Strugatskys". It is a remake of the Fredric Brown's story called Preposterous with American realities replaced by the Soviet ones: a married couple discusses their son's reading habits. The father is outraged that his son reads fantastic "nonsense" about journeys to other galaxies through the fourth dimension, time machines, the conversion of time into energy, and so on. Having expressed his indignation, he gets ready and leaves for work in an atomic car with autopilot, watching the news about the terraforming of Mars on a stereovisor. Boris Strugatsky commented on this text in his offline interview:

I no longer remember the details, but it seems to me that this was an attempt to transplant the events of "capitalist reality" into communist reality. (We were young, full of vigor and bravado — we wanted to make our contribution to the ideological struggle!) The attempt clearly failed (no new quality emerged), and the little story was sent to the archive.

==== In Our Interesting Time ====
This story was written at the end of 1960 or the very beginning of 1961 "under the impression of the successes in the study of the Moon by Soviet space rockets". The manuscript was successively rejected by all publishing houses, and over time the first two pages were lost and never recovered. The story was first published in the second supplementary volume of the Strugatskys' collected works (Text, 1993), and has since been regularly reprinted in various collected editions; it has been translated into English and Polish. Ant Skalandis considered it one of the most literarily accomplished of the Strugatskys' stories.

The plot is an episode from the life of a "martyr-editor" who spends several days at his dacha during a cold, rainy summer correcting a boring manuscript. Unexpectedly, at night a strange stranger enters his house whose appearance and behavior do not fit within ordinary boundaries. A couple of hours later some people arrive and take him away, not forgetting to take along the little stone that he had secretly left with the editor. The ordinariness of the description emphasizes that something almost unimaginable has happened — something akin to the landing of an astronaut. In 2003 Boris Strugatsky stated directly: "Did at least one reader understand that the 'man in black' had returned from the first flight to the Moon and that this little stone was from the Moon? That is exactly how the authors imagined it all back then".

For its time the little story looked quite nontrivial. After all, back then the main thing in science fiction (in SCIENTIFIC fiction) was considered to be dazzling with a new original scientific or near-scientific idea. We ourselves rated such an approach quite highly. But even then we already sensed in science fiction other, as yet elusive, potentials, and perhaps while working on this story we were striving to express the vague but already living within us premonition of another literature, which five or six years later we ourselves would define as "realistic fantasy" or "fantastic realism".

== Stories of 1958–1960 ==
The Strugatsky brothers worked most intensively in the short story genre during the period 1957–1960. In total, if one counts all drafts and texts not published at the time, they created about fifty stories and humorous sketches. According to A. Skalandis's count, in 1957 the novella From Beyond was written and the concept of "spontaneous reflex" was developed; both works appeared in print in 1958. In 1959, even before their first book, five stories were published, and about a dozen and a half more were written. Many novellas that later became part of the utopian novel Noon: 22nd Century were not published separately, although they had self-contained, complete plots. Several previously published stories, for example The White Cone of Alaid, were incorporated into the novel as chapters.

=== From Beyond ===
From Beyond was the first published work by the Strugatsky brothers. The story was written by Boris Strugatsky in the summer of 1957, based on his participation in archaeological excavations in Tajikistan. Boris Natanovich came up with the idea of combining the everyday life of an excavation with the appearance of spider-like visitors from some other world. Arkady Strugatsky found the fantastic premise unsatisfactory but unequivocally praised the success of the everyday sketches and the combination of first-person eyewitness narration with diary entries.

The action takes place in 1967. The narration is conducted from the perspective of an unnamed archaeologist working in the vicinity of Stalinabad. His colleague — the head of the excavation, Boris Yanovich Stronsky — disappeared on 23 August while going for supplies. After the appearance of the visitors, the Tajik workers assumed a connection between the actions of the spider-like beings and Stronsky's disappearance. Only in mid-September did border guards, having calculated the flight paths of the Black Helicopters, discover the Visitors' landing site and Boris Yanovich Stronsky's diary. From the diary it followed that the Visitors were robots, and the archaeologist decided to follow them in order to reach their masters. He made contact via a space satellite on the fiftieth anniversary of the Great October and reported that he had made contact with "very worthy and intelligent beings" who had scheduled an official meeting in near-Earth orbit.

From Beyond was published in the January 1958 issue of Tekhnika — Molodyozhi with illustrations by G. Borisov, and in the summer it was printed in installments in the Dushanbe newspaper Komsomolets Tadzhikistana (issues of 25, 27, 29 June and 4 July). In the same year 1958 the story was translated into Hungarian, Polish and Romanian, and later into Bulgarian under the title Guests from Space. Boris Strugatsky recalled that this was the authors' first encounter with editorial arbitrariness, when they were required to insert a passage about Soviet-Chinese friendship into the text, which they did.

=== Spontaneous Reflex ===
The second published work by the Strugatskys (Znanie — sila, 1958, No. 8), and the first completed story to appear in print. According to Arkady's letter of 20 October 1957, the initial idea for the story was suggested to him by a casual conversation at a library exhibition: "These themes —cybernetics, logic machines, mechanical brain— were right under our noses, but it never occurred to any of us — as such". This fitted well with the interests of the elder brother, who even before the war had been impressed by the film Loss of Sensation and Karel Čapek's play R.U.R..

A. N. Strugatsky sent the story about the intelligent robot to his brother on 27 February 1958. Several drafts survived; the logic of the work was to remove the lengthy science-fictional passages at the end and somewhat enliven the action. According to B. N. Strugatsky himself, he only corrected a few paragraphs and rewrote the ending. The editorial office of Tekhnika — Molodyozhi rejected the story, but in May 1958 it was accepted by the editors of Znanie — sila, and it was decided to completely remove the explanatory section at the end. The co-authors did not like this text, so it was not republished until 1993, when it appeared in the second supplementary volume of the "white" collected works of the publishing house Text, after which the story was reprinted many times in various collected editions of the Strugatskys. The Strugatskys' debut gained popularity in the West and was published in English, German, Italian, French, Finnish, Romanian, Hungarian, Slovak, Polish and Spanish translations in the 1960s–1970s. In 1962 it was translated into Vietnamese; reissues of the English and Hungarian translations followed in 2015.

According to A. Skalandis, the literary merits of Spontaneous Reflex are modest, and it is interesting mainly as the first work "carefully thought out and neatly written by the brothers in ping-pong mode". In terms of content it is "classic, to the point of cliché, hard science fiction".

By order of the "Interplanetary Communications Administration" the Universal Working Machine — Uwm (UWM in the drafts) is created — an experimental prototype undergoing testing near an atomic power station. Urm possesses artificial intelligence because certain requirements were placed upon it, and the programmer-designer Piskunov tried to take them into account in his work. However, what Piskunov anticipated but did not consider a realistic possibility occurs: Urm begins to "behave" — it stops following the main program and starts determining its own behavior. It begins with boredom, then it starts exploring the surrounding room, and then breaks free, opening and breaking down doors in its path. The station staff, unprepared and unaware of the encounter with a giant intelligent machine, panic. Uwm stops obeying human commands, finding logical justifications for doing so. A capture operation has to be organized, and as a result Uwm, squeezed by several bulldozers, is successfully shut down.

According to Dmitry Volodikhin and Gennady Prashkevich, this story "introduced the Strugatskys into the world of non-fiction".

=== The Man from Pasifida ===
The Man from Pasifida is a short story written in 1958. In the manuscript, it was signed with the pseudonym "A. Berezchkov", which Arkady Strugatsky usually used when publishing his translations from Japanese.

The action of the story takes place after the end of World War II in U.S.-occupied Japan. A group of retired officers of the Imperial Japanese Army led by Baron Kato organizes an elaborate scam. Near an American military base, a mysterious Iron Man emerges from the sea, speaking only Tangut and claiming to be an emissary of an underwater civilization that wishes to trade diamonds and pearls with humanity.

The story opens with the following author's note:

The shareholders of the joint-stock company Diamond Pasifida are still waiting for news that cargo submarines of the strange underwater people will arrive in Japanese ports. Perhaps they (the shareholders) will be interested to learn some details concerning the prehistory of this promising enterprise, kindly provided to the authors of the present story by one of the witnesses to its origin...

The Man from Pasifida is one of the works that allow scholars to reconstruct the early literary development of the Strugatsky brothers. At the beginning of their writing career, the brothers experimented with several directions, including adventure literature. In 1957, Arkady Strugatsky unsuccessfully attempted to place the text in several magazines and anthologies and came to the conclusion that working in the intended direction was unpromising (letter to his brother dated December 24, 1957). In 1958, Roman Kim, the patron of the elder brother, accepted the story for the planned first issue of the almanac Adventures and Fantasy. By March the question of publication seemed settled. However, the text remained unpublished throughout 1959 amid protracted attempts to place it in the magazine Neva. The disappointment from the refusals was so strong that in a letter dated February 22, 1960, A. N. Strugatsky called the story "crap". Finally, on May 29, 1961, the text was accepted by the magazine Soviet Warrior, and it appeared in issue 17 of 1962. The story was later reprinted in the collections Only One Start (Sverdlovsk, 1971) and Fantasy-72 (Moscow, Molodaya Gvardiya, 1972). Since 1993 the text has been regularly included in collected works of the Strugatskys. The authors' archive preserves a draft of the story that differs little from the published version. In 1978, 1979 and 2005, the text was published in Bulgarian translation.

Researcher A. V. Snigirev (Ural State Law University) considered The Man from Pasifida one of the best works in the Strugatskys' oeuvre and wondered why Arkady Strugatsky spent years trying to get into print a story he himself had classified as belonging to an unpromising direction. It is likely that The Man from Pasifida was conceived during work on the novella Ash of Bikini, which also used Japanese material. In 1965 Arkady Natanovich published his translation of Kōbō Abe's story Totaloscope, whose plot and composition bear a strong resemblance to The Man from Pasifida.

It was in The Man from Pasifida that the Strugatskys first employed a technique that would become widespread in their later works: linguistic polyphony, in which characters speak different languages. The story makes extensive use of Japanese terms inserted into characters' speech, as well as unmarked cultural phenomena that the reader reconstructs as the text progresses.

The story introduces the first "charming scoundrel" in the co-authors' work — Baron Kato, whose traits can later be traced in the characters of Baron Pampa in Hard to Be a God and the driver Tuzik in Snail on the Slope. "The non-contradictory and unambiguous nature of the image... will accompany the entire creative history of the Strugatsky brothers and become a source of criticism from those who do not support the authors' desire to take science fiction beyond the bounds of entertainment literature".

According to Boris N. Strugatsky's memoirs, the authors did not like their second story because of its excessive ideological content and its adherence to the then-prevailing anti-American tradition of Kazantsev and Tushkan. A. V. Snigirev strongly disagreed with this assessment, noting that stories and novellas denouncing "their mores" and branding capitalism usually employ completely different techniques and character types. On the contrary, The Man from Pasifida is closer to the tradition of the picaresque novel than to political satire. Almost all the characters are swindlers, deceivers and rogues trying to cheat one another: Baron Kato sells the "iron man" to the American but receives only two thousand dollars out of the promised five because his bank account is nearly empty; Jerry, however, obtains five thousand in compensation from his commander; while the chief swindler Kawai, who invented the whole deception with the deep-sea visitor, pockets the money of the shareholders of Diamond Pasifida. Thus the text contains neither exposure nor unmasking, nor the obligatory positive heroes who become aware of the necessity of class struggle (as in the finale of Ash of Bikini).

Ant Skalandis also held the literary merits of the story in high regard and considered it "unjustly disparaged" by Boris Strugatsky in his Comments on the Path Traversed. According to Skalandis, the story excellently conveys Japanese landscapes: "After all, it is a great thing when an author writes about what he knows well and not by hearsay"; he also praised the polished language of the story, which both co-authors worked on carefully.

=== Six Matches ===
Six Matches) is the most frequently republished short story by the Strugatsky brothers. According to bibliographer V. I. Borisov, it has seen at least 25 reprints in Russian, 4 in English between 1960 and 2005, 3 in Japanese, 6 in Spanish (in two different translations), 9 in German (in two different translations), and so on.

The core idea of the story was formulated by Boris Strugatsky during his school years, influenced by his friendship with a girl whose parents worked at the Bekhtereva Institute of the Brain. Between 1955 and 1957, B. N. Strugatsky attempted to explore the theme of transferring or transplanting consciousness in two stories — Lost in the Crowd and Who Will Tell Us, Evidatte? The latter introduced the surname Komlin and experiments involving the irradiation of the brain with fast particles. By June 1958, A. N. Strugatsky suggested a different idea to his co-author brother:

...Some animal, after exposure to abcdefg-rays, starts behaving very strangely — it can see through walls, around corners, and so on. In short, it acquires the ability to "see" in the fourth dimension. And a human, to test this, subjects his own brain to the same treatment. And he too begins to see "around the corner". A bold ... experiment, <...>, the heroism of a Soviet scientist, the guiding role, etc. What do you think? And call the story "Around the Corner". Eh?..

By the end of the summer of 1958, a draft version of the story titled The Eighth in the Last Six Months was ready. The story was accepted by the editorial board of the magazine Znanie — sila and published in 1959 (issue No. 3). In the same year, it appeared in the multi-author collection Road to One Hundred Parsecs, and the following year — 1960 — in the authors' collection Six Matches. In these editions, some overly scientific details and certain factual errors were removed.

The plot begins with labor protection inspector Rybnikov investigating the case of Andrei Andreevich Komlin, head of the physics laboratory at the Central Institute of the Brain. Komlin is hospitalized with severe nervous exhaustion and damage to his memory centers. Three months earlier, a neutrino generator — a device for producing powerful neutrino beams — was delivered to the laboratory. Komlin and his assistant Gorchinsky locked themselves in and began their research. None of the institute's staff knew exactly what they were doing, but three events drew attention. Once, Gorchinsky rushed out of the laboratory, grabbed a first-aid kit, and hurried back. In the evening, when they left, the staff noticed that Komlin's hand was bandaged. On another occasion, Komlin met a colleague in the park and offered to open a book to any page, then recited huge passages from the Chinese classic novel Water Margin from memory. Later, Komlin began performing tricks: extinguishing a candle from a distance, moving objects with his gaze, and mentally multiplying large numbers. The official result of Komlin's work was a report on "neutrino acupuncture" — irradiation of the brain with a neutrino beam sharply increased immunity, resistance to poisons, accelerated healing, etc. However, Komlin also had "unofficial results". On his desk were found scales with six matches on one pan and a note with their exact weight on the other: Komlin was attempting to lift these six matches with the power of his mind. All this time, he was experimenting on himself to study how neutrino beam irradiation affected unusual abilities of the body.

According to A. Skalandis, the story's popularity was due to its unconventional — and, for Soviet science fiction — revolutionary idea of telekinesis. Moreover, the authors treated the theme of Soviet heroism in a highly original way:

...Not just romanticization of exploits, but precisely a problem. Yes, emotionally the authors sympathize with all these physicists who throw themselves on deadly doses of radiation in peacetime. But intellectually they already understand how absurd and irrational it is. They already see how this bad Korchaginism will degenerate by the late 1970s into the absurd feat of a guy who died putting out a burning collective farm field with his padded jacket. And isn't the seed of Pelevin's Omon Ra — the true epitaph for Soviet science fiction and Soviet heroism — hidden in Six Matches?

=== The SKIBR Test ===
The SKIBR Test was conceived and roughly written by A. N. Strugatsky between January and March 1959. In a letter to his brother he reported:

...I still haven't given up the idea of The Forgotten Experiment. Psychology is psychology, but science fiction without the boldest fantasy is also no good. One could make a short novella à la From Beyond in three or four chapters, written from the perspectives of different people. <...> And robots. And a mother robot that controls the worker robots. And so on...

As a result, the story The Forgotten Experiment was never realized as a novella, while the triple narrative structure was implemented in the story Private Assumptions. The first publication of The SKIBR Test appeared in the magazine Inventor and Rationalizer (No. 7, 1959). In 1960, the story was published twice: in the multi-author collection Alpha Eridani and in the Strugatskys' collection Six Matches. In the 1959–1960, editions the title varied: Test of the SKR, Test of the SKIBR. In the text the system of cybernetic scouts could be referred to as "skibr", and the word was declined. In 1983, it was reprinted in the Russian-language collection The Second Martian Invasion (New York); in the USSR it was first reprinted in 1986, in the collection Beetle in the Anthill (Riga). Since 1991, the story has been regularly included in collected works of the Strugatskys. The story was published in several European languages in the 1960s–1970s, and appeared in German and Estonian editions between 2013 and 2016.

In the manuscript and the authors' correspondence the story was called "Rehearsal of the SRR". The protagonist is the programmer-engineer Akimov, who participates in the development and debugging of the universal cybernetic complex SKIBR (System of KIbernetic Reconnaissance Scouts) intended for an upcoming interstellar expedition led by Anton Bykov (grandson of Alexei Bykov — the protagonist of Country of Crimson Clouds). In the finale of the story, Akimov is forced to join the expedition because the regular programmer has been seriously injured during sports training and can no longer fly into space.

This is one of the few, if not the only, Strugatsky story that contains explicit references to the Great Patriotic War and, in particular, to its duration of four years. Later compilers of Noon Universe chronologies often ignore this fact.

The story exists in three variants that differ partly in content (conversations between Akimov and his fiancée Nina, biographical details of some characters, the name of the university where Akimov planned to work, details of the test itself) but especially in their endings. In the version from the collection Alpha Eridani, Akimov is forced to part with Nina for twelve years (the duration of the expedition). Having agreed to fly, he tells Bykov: "So you turn out to be a completely ordinary person", after which follows the final paragraph:

Bykov stood facing the transparent wall, looking at the gray sky and thinking. Yes, he, Bykov, was a completely ordinary person. Just like the other eight billion ordinary people who work, study, love on our planet... and far from our planet. And any one of them would find it just as hard in his place. Simply unbearably hard.

In the version included in Six Matches, Nina is added to the expedition crew. According to critic V. Dyakonov, this is a "sugary and contrived happy ending" written under pressure from the editors. Apparently, this is the ending mentioned in Arkady Strugatsky's letter of September 1, 1959. In the collected works edition by the Stalker publishing house (2001), the variant from the original manuscript was published: Akimov parts with Nina, but the story is followed by Bykov's reflection:

Bykov stood facing the transparent wall, looking at the gray sky and thinking: "For how many years people have spoken and written about conflicts between the sense of duty and the desire for personal happiness. But who has spoken or written about the person who forces others to make the choice?"

This variant was discovered in the authors' drafts by researcher S. Bondarenko and approved by B. Strugatsky. In his commentary, A. Snigirev notes that the first ending conveys the message of sacrifice for a higher goal, which fully accorded with the canons of socialist realism contemporary to the writers, whereas the third can in some sense be described as philosophical. "The image of a hero who forces others to choose between duty and happiness is more suitable for a collected works edition than the previous two".

=== The Forgotten Experiment ===
The Forgotten Experiment was inspired by events in the spring of 1957, when an extended meeting of the Academic Council of the Pulkovo Observatory took place. At this meeting, Professor Nikolai Alexandrovich Kozyrev delivered his report titled Causal or Asymmetric Mechanics in Linear Approximation for the first time. B. N. Strugatsky was present at the lecture, but the idea for a story about a perpetual motion machine operating due to the physical properties of time was proposed by A. N. Strugatsky in June 1958. The final text was prepared by Boris Strugatsky in April 1959. By the end of May 1959, the manuscript had already been accepted by the editorial board of Znanie — sila. The first publication appeared in issue No. 8 of Znanie — sila, together with the story "Private Assumptions". In 1960, it was reprinted in the Strugatskys' collection Six Matches. In 1983 it was published in New York in the collection Zona. In 1990 it was reprinted in abridged form in the newspaper Komsomolets Donbassa (August 28–29). Since 1991 the story has been regularly included in collected works of the Strugatskys. It has been translated into several European languages.

The plot is based on experiments to build "time engines" carried out on the Moon, in Antarctica, in the jungles of Amazonia, and in the Siberian taiga. No visible traces of the experiments could be detected, and the Siberian experimental base was subsequently handed over to a nuclear laboratory. Forty-eight years after the start of the experiment in Siberia, a powerful burst of radiation occurred, resulting in the formation of the Zone — a 200-kilometer-wide preserve of mutations. The Zone is fenced off by a cordon, and even biologists are not allowed inside. A group of researchers in a highest-protection space tank penetrates deep into the Zone and discovers that the experiment was completely successful: the engine began to "squeeze" energy out of time and eject it into the surrounding space in the form of non-quantized protomatter, which interacts with the environment.

The story introduces for the first time the term "cyber", which the Strugatskys would later widely use to refer to sufficiently complex, multifunctional "intelligent" machines. According to A. P. Lukashin, the Strugatskys were the second in Soviet science fiction to articulate the idea of obtaining non-quantized protomatter — following the story Guest from the Bookcase by Alexander Romanovich Belyaev.

A. Skalandis paid particular attention to the fact that the description of the Zone "is a genuine, fully realized, confidently written, and even brilliant sketch for Roadside Picnic. Here there is not just a Zone; here there are even people entering it for the first time, and those who already have experience — in other words, a kind of 'stalkers'. The psychological layout of the first chapter of the future Roadside Picnic is fully rehearsed here, and it is impressive. It is no coincidence that the sensitive editors at Znanie — sila asked to tone down the science in this story and called it 'genuine artistic literature without reservations'".

=== Private assumptions ===
The story was written in mid-1958 by Boris Strugatsky, inspired by the monograph of Academician V. A. Fock Theory of Space, Time and Gravitation. The section On the Clock Paradox contained a calculation from which it followed that during a long space flight under conditions of uniformly accelerated motion, no clock lag characteristic of the famous "twin paradox" occurs. Moreover, there is an advance instead. The section ended with the words: "However, one should not forget that the formula <...> is not general, but derived under rather specific assumptions regarding the nature of the motion".

The original version of the story, written by B. N. Strugatsky, was titled A Bouquet of Roses (the title was suggested by the elder brother). From November 1958 the text was repeatedly revised and reworked by both authors jointly and separately. Boris Strugatsky recalled:

This is one of the first of our stories written in the new, Hemingwayesque-like manner — deliberate laconicism, meaningful semantic subtexts, an ascetic rejection of superfluous epithets and metaphors. And the most necessary minimum of scientific explanations — that minimum without which the reader would understand nothing at all, and the very idea of "specific assumptions" would be lost.

The story consists of three novellas, each narrated from the perspective of its main character. It is the only work by the Strugatskys in which the narration is conducted from the point of view of a female protagonist — the actress Ruzhena Naskova (in the second novella). Her husband —Valentin Petrov— heads the third stellar expedition and is due to return to Earth in 200–250 years (thanks to relativistic effects). Since the starship "Mourmets" has direct photon thrust (absorbing interstellar matter), it is possible to maintain a constant acceleration of more than 1g, as a result of which the expedition members discovered a planet suitable for life, named Ruzhena after her, and returned to Earth six months after launch by the terrestrial calendar, although for the starship crew 17 years had passed. The story marks the first appearance of the starship pilot Leonid Gorbovsky — later a recurring character in the Strugatskys' "Midday cycle".

The first publication of the story appeared in the magazine Znanie – sila (No. 8, 1959) and in the newspaper Zarya kommunizma (Riga, Latvian SSR, September 12–22, 1959). In 1960 it was published twice: in the multi-author collection Alpha Eridani and in the Strugatskys' collection of stories Six Matches — in differing versions. In 1991, it was reissued in a miniature collection of the Strugatskys' stories — Bibliotechka zhurnala Poligrafiya (No. 10, 1991). Since the 1990s it has been regularly reprinted in the collected works of the Strugatskys. The story has been printed many times in various European languages, and in 1963 — in Japanese.

The story exists in two main versions, the "canonical" one being the second — from the collection Six Matches. The differences between them consist of numerous changes of two or three words; the main distinctions are contained in the second of the three novellas, where in the first version the story of how Ruzhena and Valentin met is described in detail. The heroine's maiden name changed three times: in the Znanie – sila version she is Ruzhena Kunertova (according to V. Dyakonov, the surname is taken from the novel The Good Soldier Švejk by Jaroslav Hašek), in Alpha Eridani and reprints of the first version — Ruzhena Tomanova; in the Six Matches version — Ruzhena Naskova.

=== The Incident ===
The story was conceived by Boris Strugatsky in the summer of 1959 under the influence of purely prosaic circumstances — he was fighting flies in the room of the hotel-dormitory of the Pulkovo Observatory.

In September, the manuscript of the story under the abbreviation "ТЧ"" (the meaning of which has been lost) was criticized by Arkady Strugatsky, who stated that the triviality of the plot could only be saved by an original, preferably humorous, resolution. A new ending was not achieved; the reworked version of the text by Arkady Natanovich under the title Flies, after a change of title, was published in the author's collection Path to Amalthea. Subsequently, the story was repeatedly reissued; it appeared in several European languages and in Japanese (in 1974).

The plot of the story is the following: a space expedition is returning to Earth from Titan, a moon of Saturn. On board are the ship's captain Stankevich, pilot Tummer, navigator Viktor Borisovich (his surname is not mentioned), flight engineer Lidin, and biologist Malyshev. The voyage proceeds routinely, with only Malyshev worrying about his slug — a representative of Titan's biosphere, caught from an oil lake. However, as they approach Mars, the navigator (from whose perspective the narration is conducted) discovers an unearthly fly that has hatched from spores of non-protein life that accidentally entered the ship. The "flies" begin to multiply rapidly, and soon the ship, and then Earth, face the threat of infection. With the help of the crew, the captain finds a way out of the critical situation: everyone puts on spacesuits, the air is replaced with hydrogen, the pressure is increased to 6 atmospheres, after which explosive decompression is carried out. Biologist Malyshev, having lost the Titan slug (it was burst by internal pressure, and the fragments were dried by the vacuum), discovers that the flies are easily destroyed by ordinary water. "Contraband" he preserves several specimens, since their appearance promises Earth unprecedented prospects:

Imagine a factory without machines and boilers. Giant insectaries, in which billions of our flies breed and develop at incredible speed. Raw material — air. Hundreds of tons of first-class inorganic cellulose per day. Paper, fabrics, coatings...

In the Comments on What Has Been Passed, B. Strugatsky noted that in the story "...there was nothing new for us. There was no freshness. None at all. We were clearly getting tired of writing short stories. The era of novellas was approaching".

=== Literary features of the Strugatskys' science fiction novellas ===
==== Industrial genre and psychology ====
The stories published during the early period of the Strugatskys' creative work shared certain common features, which were analyzed by the Polish literary scholar Wojciech Kajtoch. In particular, he argued that a typical shortcoming of technical science fiction (and it is precisely in this genre that the Strugatskys' stories were written) is the difficulty of introducing the popularized material, although the authors tried to diversify their linguistic means. Scientific explanations had to be justified by the plot action, and the device of a narrator was extremely rarely used. Nevertheless, according to V. Kajtoch, all the stories included in the collection Six Matches (1960) "represent various realizations of one scheme": a specialist knowledgeable in a scientific or engineering problem explains it accessibly to an "interested layman". Kajtoch noted that the Strugatskys' science fiction stories are also inscribed in the context of industrial literature: every conducted experiment or made discovery harbors enormous possibilities and constitutes a turning point for science or an industrial branch. In subsequent reissues, the authors sought to remove most of the descriptions of technology, while retaining or expanding the moral and psychological aspects.

A. Gromova, in her article on the Strugatskys for the Short Literary Encyclopedia, also acknowledged that science fiction works devoted to space themes and the prospects of scientific and technical progress "are characterized by a certain traditionalism of themes and plots". This is compensated for by attention to the psychology and intellectual life of the characters, the striving for individualization of characters, and the "realism" of details in the fantastic world.

According to V. Kajtoch, Six Matches and "The Forgotten Experiment" represented the development of the idea of "conflict under communism", directly continuing the themes of the same authors' The Land of Crimson Clouds and Ivan Yefremov's utopian Andromeda: A Space-Age Tale. This is the so-called "conflict of the good with the better", that is, the collision of justified enthusiasm and equally justified caution among people striving toward a common goal and free from personal ambitions or the desire for primacy at any cost. In the story Six Matches, contrary to the socialist realism tradition, the conflict remains unresolved. Although the inspector formally wins, the authors "wink" at the reader, showing that in his youth the same character also allowed himself to become carried away (and was injured when, without waiting for rescue robots, he discharged certain dangerous objects); this emphasizes the non-antagonistic nature of the conflict. However, in "Operation SKIBR" the moral problem touched upon is much more significant. In the version with the tragic resolution, it is shown that the unwritten moral code of people under communism does not allow for the possibility of refusal, and Akimov very quickly agrees, although at the beginning of the conversation with Captain Bykov he had not even considered that he was completely erasing not only his own life but also that of his young wife, whom he was forced to leave for 12 years. Bykov's drama is different — it is a collision of responsibility and power, since the captain knows that Akimov is the only possible candidate, and by breaking his life he sees no other means to achieve the success of the future grand enterprise — the stellar expedition. In the optimistic version of the story, the moral drama and the themes of choice, responsibility, and power disappear entirely, leaving only the science-fictional idea.

Summing up the Strugatskys' magazine publications, V. Kajtoch noted:

Already the magazine debut of the beginning fantasists created the impression that what interested them most — if one removes the descriptions of technology — was the same thing that interests any realist writer, in the most frequently understood meaning of this term in our country, a psychological writer.

==== Dialogue with the Other as a genre marker of science fiction ====
According to V. N. Lisovitskaya (Samara National Research University named after Academician S. P. Korolev), several motifs characteristic of the poetics of the Strugatskys' early prose can be traced throughout the rest of their work. In the Strugatskys, the revelation of human personality occurs through overcoming external hostile circumstances, and the concept of the "Other", so important for science fiction literature, is not present as a given. As V. Kajtoch noted above, the leading theme of the Strugatskys was not technological progress and space travel, but the problem of human existence and his moral path. The fantastic here is merely a backdrop, a way to attract the reader's attention and enter into dialogue with him. The heroes of the early Strugatskys are not devoid of psychological depth, but overall they are limited to the role necessary for the development of the plot.

According to V. Lisovitskaya, against this background the story "Spontaneous Reflex" stands out, whose main character is Urm — the Universal Working Machine. It was designed "for work in conditions that even the most brilliant programmer cannot predict exactly". Apparently, this is the only work by the Strugatskys in which the question of artificial intelligence and the consequences of its creation is raised. At the external level of perception, this problem may not be noticed at all, since the authors speak of the physical danger to the creator posed by the created being's ability to escape obedience. At a deeper level, however, it is about an attempt to establish dialogue with the Other: the creator of Urm, Piskunov, tries to come to an agreement with the robot. Machine consciousness, unlike human consciousness, is incapable of operating with abstract categories, and in order to overcome this barrier, Urm is programmed for self-learning. As a result, it begins to "behave" in its own way, which leads to clashes with humans. People did not perceive the robot as a subject; it was merely an object, a tool for performing work that was too dangerous to send humans to do. The manifestation of the spontaneous reflex forced people to look at the robot as an "other" capable of acting under conditions of unpredictability. Dialogue proves impossible when the "other" not only differs from the "self", but is also fundamentally incapable of self-awareness and awareness of its own otherness. "In the interaction between man and Urm, a non-genuine communication or non-genuine dialogue is realized. The robot acts only as a „performer" (carrying out its own program), but has no goal of establishing a relationship".

=== Collaboration in the writing of early short stories ===
Researcher A. V. Snigirev (Ural State Law University) noted that the Strugatskys' early novellas should be considered separately from the body of texts included in the collection Noon: 22nd Century, as they were later revised by the already established authors. Works such as From Outside, Spontaneous Reflex and similar texts allow one to trace the formation of the authorial duo "the Strugatsky brothers", their difficult path toward developing an algorithm for collaborative work, and the accumulation of artistic techniques that would be used throughout their subsequent oeuvre.

In contrast to the scheme described by Boris Strugatsky, in 1958–1959 the joint work of Arkady and Boris Natanovich had a "semi-autonomous" character: one of the brothers would write a text and send it to the other "for revision". It was according to this scheme that Spontaneous Reflex was created, as is well reflected in their correspondence. The same and subsequent correspondence also reveals the importance for Arkady Strugatsky of the "first reader", a role most often played by his wife Elena Ilinichna (née Oshanina), and later by close relatives or selected friends.

From the brothers' correspondence of February 1958 concerning Spontaneous Reflex, A. Snigirev singled out a number of characteristic features of the Strugatskys' "apprentice" period of creativity. Among them: the authors' awareness of the "excessiveness" of the text (that is, writing "for reserve", a trait also typical of graphomaniacs); the need for a model to imitate (that is, the inability to find an original solution to the creative task at hand); the use of obvious and simple devices; the lack of correlation between the goals and tasks of the literary work (an attempt to combine scientific explanations with humour); and complete uncertainty about the quality of the text.

While working on Spontaneous Reflex, Arkady and Boris Strugatsky were still learning to understand each other: the elder brother was unable to clearly explain exactly what he disliked in the initial text and granted the younger brother complete creative freedom. Nevertheless, during the discussion at the editorial office of the magazine Znanie — sila on 27 May 1958, the ending of the story written by B. N. Strugatsky was disliked, but A. N. Strugatsky brought his own version, which was disliked even more. In the end, it was decided to conclude the text with the capture of Urm, and to provide the scientific explanation in the form of an author's aside. This duality in relation to editorial intervention and great sensitivity to the opinion of first readers remained in the Strugatskys' work for many years to come: on the one hand, the co-authors repeatedly expressed dissatisfaction with the absurdity and foolishness of the proposed changes, yet they introduced the changes and sometimes did so willingly. This could significantly improve the texts.

Boris Strugatsky noted that it was in Spontaneous Reflex that the co-authors' favourite device of an open ending was used for the first time. A. Snigirev wrote that the ending of the story echoes the first part of the novella Monday Begins on Saturday (the phrase: "You'll work with us and find everything out, I give you my word"), and that on the level of fabula and overall conception there are also echoes with Six Matches. In shaping the image of the main character — Gorchinsky — the external features of Arkady Strugatsky himself were clearly used, including the checkered shirt that appears repeatedly in various photographs. On the level of phonetics, the surname is quite allusive: "Gorchinsky" — "Strugatsky". Emphasizing the character's verbal coarseness, the writers later applied the same behavioural model when creating the image of Vitka Korneev in NIICHAVO (the Research Institute of Sorcery and Wizardry). This may testify both to a kind of creative sentimentality and reluctance to part with a beloved character, and to a certain creative weakness — the reproduction of previous achievements when it was impossible to create new meanings. However, when writing The SKIBR Trial, the principle of seriality was not employed, and the important cosmonaut Bykov in that story turns out to be not the hero of The Land of Crimson Clouds, but his grandson.

=== Critics ===
Even the Strugatskys' very earliest short works attracted the attention of fellow writers and critics. Boris Lyapunov in a major survey of Soviet science fiction mentioned the story From Outside, linking the descriptions of the aliens—intelligent machines—with the tradition of H. G. Wells.

French writer Jacques Bergier mentioned the Strugatskys in his survey of Soviet science fiction and called the stories From Outside and Six Matches "remarkable".

The collection Six Matches elicited a certain number of reviews within the discussions about the nature and functions of the science-fiction genre at the turn of the 1950s–1960s. V. Kaito kh noted that the collection was published by a children's literature press, and the cosmic "hare" Lozovsky was a modern man, "a worthy Soviet scientist, a representative of Humanity with a capital H".

In a collective review by M. Iskrin, written in a didactic style, it is recommended to arrange a meeting between school-age readers and a physics teacher so that "the entertaining and largely quite accessible stories for Pioneers become even more interesting".

In 1961 the Strugatskys' works were mentioned in a sarcastic-toned survey by V. Shitova in the magazine Yunost. The critic found in various works by the Strugatskys (for example, in the story "The Forgotten Experiment") features of horror literature that were also characteristic of other science-fiction writers. As a result, V. Shitova came to the conclusion that all science fiction is a lower genre whose works lack artistic taste and are aimed at the least demanding audience. "When the reading of such books becomes a habit—and it does become a habit—a person imperceptibly and often irreparably loses the taste for good books." In contrast, she placed the works of H. G. Wells and Alexander Belyaev, "who did not entertain with the horrible and did not invent it. The horrible in great science-fiction writers always arose from deep reflections on the life of nature and society." The Strugatskys' collections Six Matches and The Way to Amalthea were generally recognized as "requiring allowances for the genre", because they contained "too much that is familiar and tiresome".

== Return. Noon: 22nd Century ==
The authors defined their utopian book as a novel, and its structural parts as chapters. In contemporary literary studies, there is a fairly wide range of opinions regarding the genre classification of this text. D. Volodikhine and G. Prashkevich, based on the history of the text and its structure, defined Noon: 22nd Century as a collection consisting of the novella Return and "a whole battery of short stories". Some of the novellas that had been previously published before being included in the novel underwent significant changes or were radically reworked. There were also novellas that did not make it into the utopia and were never published.

The main plot line of the Strugatskys' utopia is that, during experiments to achieve speed of light in 2017, the photon-powered planet flyer Taimyr was thrown forward a century, and of the entire crew, only two survived —navigator Sergei Kondratyev and doctor Evgeny Slavin— who must adapt to the new world built by their own descendants, their "great-great-grandchildren".

=== 1961 edition ===
In the brothers' correspondence, Return is first mentioned on March 19, 1959, and the development of plot ideas continued until the end of the year. On July 19, 1960, Arkady suggested making the text as a mosaic — introducing into the fabric of the utopian narrative "little stories from present-day life... à la Hemingway or Dos Passos". The proposal was accepted by Boris, and the short interruptive chapters were written but rejected by Detgiz. Most of them were later used by A. N. Strugatsky many years afterward in the independent novella The Devil Among People.

The novellas included in Return were The White Cone of Alaid (renamed Defeat), Malefactors (a reworking of Kipling), Deep Search, Almost the Same, and The Rendezvous. Evidence of authorial maturity is found in the landscape lyricism of the text, the subtext-laden dialogues, and the "Hemingwayesque" laconicism. G. Prashkevich and D. Volodikhine noted, however, that the novellas of Return lack the harsh monumental "machismo" of Hemingway and Dos Passos. Technical details and explanations were largely transferred by the Strugatskys into dialogues.

The text of Return exists in three significantly different variants in terms of composition and selection of novellas. Publication began in 1961 in the magazine Ural under the title Noon, 22nd Century: Chapters from the Novella 'Return'. It included ten novellas: The Overaged, Chronicle, Two from the 'Taimyr', Self-Propelled Roads, Famous People (the actual Return), The Magic Tablecloth, The Desantniki, The Rendezvous, The Well-Arranged Planet, and What You Will Be Like. The novellas follow in sequence, and this particular order was not reproduced in subsequent publications.

=== 1962 edition ===
In 1962, Detgiz released a separate book, reprinted the following year in 1963. This edition was titled Return (Noon, 22nd Century) and contained 5 chapters into which 16 novellas were distributed. Both early versions of the cycle — the "Ural" version of 1961 and the Detgiz version of 1962 — were reproduced in the complete 33-volume collected works of the Strugatskys in 2017.

The "Ural" variant in the 1962 edition was supplemented with novellas dealing with the pedagogical system of the communist future (Malefactors and Weariness of Spirit), as well as novellas about various aspects of life in the Noon world: the Ocean Guard — Moby Dick, brain coding — Candles Before the Console, programming and artificial intelligence — The Riddle of the Hind Leg, advanced physics and telepathy — Natural Science in the World of Spirits.

According to V. Kaito kh, Return in the 1962 edition is directly connected to the previous collection Six Matches. Stories from that collection — Deep Search and Defeat — were incorporated into Return with minor revisions; there are also direct references to characters and facts from earlier Strugatsky works. In the overwhelming majority of the novellas, the basic artistic device typical of the Strugatskys at that time is employed — the action revolves around some technical device, invention, or discovery, while the accompanying "human motif" introduces themes of the future human, his morality and mindset, and the society in which he lives. In other words, the writers continued to work in the industrial-fantastic genre, and elements of the fantastic world required explanations, interpretations, and descriptions. Among the many plots of the novellas included in Return, there are descriptions of self-propelled roads that allow one to visit any place on the planet without haste or discomfort; future agriculture with breeding of genetically modified cows and pasturing of whales in the ocean. Even a supercomputer is described — the Collector of Scattered Information ("Great CRI") — capable of reconstructing past events (including dinosaur battles) from their informational traces.

=== 1967 edition ===
When republishing their utopia in 1967, Strugatsky brothers sought to transform the cycle of novellas into a novel by changing the names and professions of certain characters in order to integrate them into the main storyline. The most important change was the addition of a prehistory of the Noon world of the 21st century — the novellas Night on Mars and Almost the Same. Total number of novellas increased to 19. The sequence of the plot was also altered: the novella The Rendezvous was moved to the end of the narrative, and its main character became Paul Gnedykh from the pedagogical line (Malefactors and Weariness of Spirit). The storylines of Gorbovsky (On Wanderers and Travelers) and Atos-Sidorov were continued; these characters were first introduced precisely in the novella Malefactors. The worsening of Soviet-Chinese relations led to the fact that in the novella The Desantniki (and subsequently in The Well-Arranged Planet), Lu Guan-cheng was renamed Ryu Waseda, and Walkenstein began speaking Japanese instead of Chinese.

==== Night on Mars ====
An independent novella about researchers on Mars who rush to provide medical assistance at a remote base where the first human is to be born beyond Earth. Having sunk their rover in a cavern filled with water — the first water found on the Red Planet — the doctors proceed on foot, threatened by predatory representatives of the Martian biosphere — "flying leeches". In the magazine publication, the story was titled Night on Mars (Znanie — sila, 1960); the doctors were named Privalov and Grintsevich. In the book edition (the collection The Way to Amalthea) they are Mandel and Novago. In the Way to Amalthea edition the story was called Night in the Desert; in both variants the family in which the child is to be born is the Spitsyns, a direct reference to the novella The Land of Crimson Clouds. In the 1967 Noon edition, Evgeny Markovich Slavin — one of the main protagonists of the utopia — was born on Mars.

==== Almost the Same ====
An independent novella about the daily life of cadets at the Higher School of Cosmonautics. Published in the collection The Way to Amalthea. Originally, this was a chapter of the novella The Way to Amalthea that did not make it into the final version and was heavily reworked. In the 1960 version, the Chinese elements are mentioned: the mentor of the Cosmonautics School bears the name Chen Kun; in 1967, he became Todor Kan. After inclusion in the novel, the characters were renamed: Kolya Ermakov became Sergei Kondratyev, the student Wang Wei-ming became Mamedov, and Mr. Hopkins (owner of the nationalized United Rocket Construction) was originally named Morgan.

==== The Riddle of the Hind Leg ====
Under the title The Great CRI, the novella was published in the multi-author collection Golden Lotus (1961). A humorous story about the daily life of programmer-scientists working with a supercomputer. The deputy head of the research group — Paul Rudak — tasks the machine with creating a consistent model of a seven-legged ram lacking a cerebellum...

When incorporated into the novel, the characters' names changed. Originally there was no opening scene in which Slavin (who became a journalist in the future world) converses with Jean Parnkala. Paul Rudak was originally named Pablo Ruda, the Tahitian head of the film library was named Annie Kent. The massacre in Constantinople (a CRI reconstruction shown to Slavin) mentioned in the novel was originally the Battle of Marengo. The original publication of the novella contained numerous footnotes explaining terms such as "effector machine", the theory of large errors, the hypothesis of dinosaur extinction due to a nearby supernova explosion, and so on.

==== Deep Search ====
The novella was published independently in the collection Six Matches (1960) and in the multi-author collection Deep Search (1962). The main character of the story —oceanologist Zvantsev— was replaced in the 1967 novel by Kondratyev, since Moby Dick gave way to this story.

==== Candles Before the Console ====
As an independent novella, it was published by Leningrad Detgiz in the collection The Amber Room (1961). When included in the 1962 edition, a correction was made: the Sverdlovsk Institute of Biological Coding was changed to Novosibirsk. For the 1967 edition, after Moby Dick was replaced by Deep Search, the novella was radically reworked. In the 1962 version, the storyline was the following: oceanologist Zvantsev (first mentioned in Malefactors) invites the starship pilot from the past, Kondratyev, to work in the Ocean Guard (novella Return). Kondratyev becomes commander of a submarine squadron but lives as a hermit in his free time. In Moby Dick, Irina Egorova (with whom Paul Gnedykh almost fell in love in Weariness of Spirit) falls in love with him, moves to the Far East, and brings the man from the past back to a full life. At the same time, Zvantsev (in Deep Search) hunts a giant squid together with Japanese intern Akiko Kanda, who later becomes his wife. In this novella, Zvantsev and his wife hurry to deliver important information to Academician Okada, who is awaiting death and the copying of his personality onto artificial carriers at the Institute of Biocoding. After the 1967 editing, Kondratyev replaced Zvantsev, Akiko became his wife, and all references to whaling were removed.

Several versions of the reason for such a radical replacement existed. According to S. Bondarenko, the authors probably concluded that two almost identical stories about the Ocean Guard were too many for a utopia in which each novella reflected one facet of the communist world. Zvantsev was a secondary character, whereas Kondratyev was a recurring central protagonist. Moreover, as Boris Strugatsky noted in an offline interview, the corresponding storyline was inspired by Arthur C. Clarke's novel The Deep Range, and the authors did not want the "similarity to turn into, heaven forbid, plagiarism".

==== On Wanderers and Travelers ====
A lyrical sketch about Leonid Gorbovsky on vacation was first published in the Molodaya Gvardiya collection Fantasy. 1963. It was included in the novel in 1967. S. Bondarenko noted that the editing is somewhat puzzling: in the story Gorbovsky says that the windowless and doorless buildings were found by astropilots on the planet Leonida, while in the novel they are on Mars and Vladislava (which Gorbovsky stormed in the novella The Desantniki). At the same time, in the 1967 edition, immediately after On Wanderers... comes the novella The Well-Arranged Planet about contact with the civilization of Leonida, and it specifically discusses buildings without windows and doors. B. N. Strugatsky recalled that the story changed titles several times during discussions between the co-authors, yet none of the censors noticed that the phrase On wanderers... is part of an Orthodox prayer.

==== Defeat ====
Defeat is an independent novella conceived by A. N. Strugatsky in the summer of 1959 on the revolutionary technological transformation — from now on, machines and buildings can be grown rather than built. Published in the magazine Znanie — sila under the title The White Cone of Alaid (1959), under the same title in the collection Golden Lotus (1961), and under the current title in the author's collection Six Matches. The story was included in the novel in 1967. During reworking, names and titles changed: the novel's Mikhail Albertovich Sidorov was Fyodor Semyonovich Ashmarin in other publications, and the list of planets stormed by Desantnik-Ashmarin also differed. The text mentions the SKIBR system. The meeting of Ashmarin with Tatsuzo Mishima was removed. The story contains much more detailed technical descriptions of the development of the mecha-embryo — the Egg. Positronic computers are mentioned there — a direct reference to the future world of Isaac Asimov.

==== The Rendezvous ====
This novella was published only as part of the utopia; in the 1962 edition it was titled People, People... Its content is intensely psychological: the main character, a hunter, in fog on an alien planet, destroys an unknown four-armed monster with a thermal bullet, but suspects that the bright flash was an explosion of oxygen — meaning he killed an intelligent being in a spacesuit... The hardest burden falls on his friend the doctor, who dissected the remains of the four-armed creature and knew the truth from the beginning.

In preparation for the 1967 edition, the story's place in the structure of the novel changed, and the characters were radically renamed. The doctor Wilhelm Ermler became Alexander Kostylin (Sashka-Lin from Malefactors and Weariness of Spirit), the hunter Igor Kharin became Paul Gnedykh. In the 1962 edition, the hunter returned from the planet Pandora; in 1967 — from Yayla. The homeland of the white-eyed monster became Vladislava instead of Venus.

==== Archival materials ====
The novella The Magic Tablecloth (a humorous story in which the delivery service confuses the neighbors' cybernetic kitchen with a washing machine) was published only as part of the novel, but it also existed in the form of an independent story, two variants of which are preserved in the archive. The characters there bear abstract names: Physicist, Literary Scholar and his wife, also referred to as "Tanechka". When the cycle was republished in 1975 in one volume with the novella Space Mowgli, The Magic Tablecloth had to be removed to fit the publication's length restrictions.

In 2016, in the anthology The World of the Strugatskys. Noon and Midnight, the archival story Diving at the Octopus Reef was published, most likely written at the turn of 1959–1960. This text mentions many realities and characters present in the stories of the collections Six Matches and Return: Kostylin, oceanologist Zvantsev, the asteroid Bamberga (which would occupy a significant place in the plot of the future Probationers), and the term "oversan" (The Way to Amalthea). According to G. Panchenko, the setting of this novella roughly corresponds to Night on Mars and Almost the Same written around the same time. He also believed that the story "did not go forward" for a number of reasons, including the authors' reluctance to overburden the cycle with "oceanic" chapters. However, the theme of the Octopus Reef was repeatedly raised in the Strugatskys' working notebooks and correspondence later on.

== Last short stories ==
=== Archival texts ===
According to Boris Strugatsky, by around 1962–1963 the co-authors realized that they no longer enjoyed writing short stories, but they continued to do so out of inertia. The number of short-form texts decreased significantly, and none of them was published promptly.

Other materials have been preserved in the archive: for example, the only non-science-fiction story The Year Thirty-Seven, written by B. N. Strugatsky in 1960 and retyped in final form in 1966; its content is characterized by the title — repressions. However, against the background of the works of Aleksandr Solzhenitsyn, V. Shalamov, and Yu. Dombrovsky, the piece seemed immature to the authors, and they made no attempt to publish it. Also preserved are humorous sketches and "everyday playlets" written "for themselves"; the latter were composed by A. N. Strugatsky in 1960 for a home wall newspaper. According to S. Bondarenko, the style of speech employed there was later used by the authors in Snail on the Slope. The humorous sketch Does Man Think?, a kind of parody of the work of I. Varshavsky with clear influences by R. Sheckley and Stanisław Lem, was written by B. N. Strugatsky during one of the meetings of the Writers' Union in 1963 or 1964. In September 1963, while vacationing in the small settlement of Rybkolhoz in Crimea, the Strugatskys wrote the humorous piece Adarwinism, which Boris Natanovich acknowledged as the only record that quite accurately illustrates the co-authors' working method. All the works listed above first appeared in print in 2001 in the collected works edition published by Stalker.

In the folder with novellas there also remains the humorous story The Time Machine (Almost According to G. J. Wells), which was not published separately, but was used in an expanded form in the third part of the novella Monday Begins on Saturday (Privalov's journey through the described future). The ending of the story —with the suggestion to visit the described present— was moved further along in the text by the authors. The characters were named the Time Traveler, the Reader, and the Philosopher (Filya). The original text was published in the second issue of the series Unknown Strugatskys in 2006.

=== Road Sign ===
Around 1962 the story Road Sign was written; the following year the Strugatskys used it as the prologue to the novella Hard to Be a God. According to the original manuscript, the story was first published in 2017 as part of the 33-volume complete collected works. The theme of the story is almost identical to that of the prologue, with the exception of names: the child heroes play at being Earth pirates; instead of "saiva" the text mentions selva; there is no Arkanar, and instead of Irukanian pirates there are Dutch ones. Also absent is the address "noble don"; all the names mentioned in the story are taken from adventure literature: instead of Marshal Tots — Henry of Navarre, John Hopkins instead of Arata, Sebastian Pereira instead of Bona Sarancha, and so on. Notably, the main heroes played at being Rumata the Liberator, but in the composition of the novella he was replaced by Gex the Irukanian.

=== The First People on the First Raft ===
Originally the story was titled Wild Vikings and, according to Boris Strugatsky, was written in 1963. No information about it remains in the authors' archive or correspondence. This contradicts the testimony cited here from Arkady Strugatsky's working diary:

December 26 <1963> returned from Leningrad. Wrote Monday Begins on Saturday, On the Question of Cyclotation, The First People on the First Raft, Poor Wicked People...

The story, written in a strictly realistic manner, tells of how the hunter Oleg Markov unexpectedly encounters some savages who, despite the primitiveness of their raft and weapons, are capable of moving through space. When retyped in final form at the beginning of 1964, the existing title appeared — a line from the poem Captains by N. S. Gumilev. The story was never published as such, but in 1968 it was sent to the Leningrad children's magazine Kostyor as the first chapter of the collective burime novella Flying Nomads. It was first republished in 1990 in the almanac Geya, included in the 1993 collected works edition by "Text", and has been republished many times since.

=== On the Question of Cyclotation ===
According to Boris Strugatsky, the story was written at the very end of 1963; the following year it was sent to the editorial office of Ural'skiy sledopyt and lost. At the time of the writing and publication of Comments on the Path Traveled (2001–2003), it was considered lost. However, a copy of the manuscript has been preserved in the collection of Boris Zaikin. The plot of the story is as follows: an expedition from a large city searches the mountains for a site to install a new large telescope. Suddenly a stranger appears to one of the participants, introducing himself as a magician. After a brief conversation, however, the stranger unexpectedly loses composure and reveals that he is a scientist from an unnamed super-civilization and that the origin of life on Earth (including intelligent life) was an unforeseen consequence of a scientific experiment. Far worse is the fact that life, and above all humanity, is doomed to rapid extinction...

In 2008, the story was published in Boris Strugatsky's almanac Noon, 21st Century; it was republished in 2011, 2017, and 2018, including in the complete 33-volume collected works. In 2010 it was translated into Bulgarian and in 2023 into Italian.

=== Poor Wicked People ===
This was the Strugatskys' last short story. Written in 1963 under the title Prayer, which was later changed to Hard to Be a God. These same words concluded the original version. The authors quickly used the title for the novella, while the story remained in the archive until 1991, when it was published in the newspaper Kuznetskiy rabochiy (Novokuznetsk). Since then it has been republished many times in collected works and anthologies, and has been translated into Spanish and Polish.

The plot of the story is as follows: the deposed king of an unknown state on another planet, after a failed assassination attempt on his life, takes refuge in the temple of the local god. There, while praying, he recalls his father, King the Simpleton, during whose reign angels came down from the heavens. The angels assisted the Simpleton in governing, drove off nomads, and preserved the ruler's health and youth. However, the angels perish (one is killed by "Uncle Bat", who later attempts to assassinate the story's protagonist), taking all their secrets with them; soon afterward the Simpleton is also murdered. The king, realizing that the matter concerns not rule but his own life, prays to the god at his altar for salvation. The Earthmen, observing the scene as "god", hesitate to respond...

According to the bibliographer and writer L. Filippov, the story, unpublished after it was written, represented a breakthrough to a new stage in the Strugatskys' creativity. The short form proved too brief, since the narrator simply does not have time to elaborate the historical background and setting. In the finished finale of the story, the central idea of the future novella Hard to Be a God is already fully present:

== Bibliography ==
- Volodikhin, D.; Prashkevich, G. (2012). Братья Стругацкие [The Strugatsky Brothers]. Zhizn' zamechatel'nykh lyudey, issue 1331. Moscow: Molodaya Gvardiya. p. 350. ISBN 978-5-235-03475-4.
- Kazakov, V.; Kerzin, A.; Fleishman, Yu. (1999). "Библиография. От составителей. Художественные произведения" [Bibliography. From the compilers. Fiction works]. In Compiled by Vladimir Borisov (ed.). Миры братьев Стругацких. Энциклопедия: Том 2 [Worlds of the Strugatsky Brothers. Encyclopedia: Volume 2]. Worlds of the Strugatsky Brothers. Moscow, St. Petersburg: AST, Terra Fantastica. pp. 419—460 (in total 560). ISBN 5-237-01562-X.
- Kajtoch, W. (2003). "The Strugatsky Brothers / Transl. from Polish by Vladimir Borisov" [The Strugatsky Brothers / Transl. from Polish by Vladimir Borisov]. Arkady and Boris Strugatsky Collected Works in 11 Volumes [Collected Works in 11 Volumes] (Volume 12, supplementary ed.). Donetsk: Stalker. pp. 409—638 (in total 699). ISBN 966-696-215-2.
- Lisovitskaya, V. N. (2022). "Поиск «другого» в прозе братьев Стругацких 50-х годов" [The Search for the "Other" in the Prose of the Strugatsky Brothers in the 1950s]. Kul'tura I Tekst. 1 (48): 57–67. doi:10.37386/2305-4077-2022-1-57-67.
- Bondarenko, S. (2005). Compiled by S. Bondarenko (ed.). Неизвестные Стругацкие [Unknown Strugatskys]. Worlds of the Strugatsky Brothers (From "The Land of Crimson Clouds" to "Hard to Be a God": drafts, manuscripts, variants ed.). Donetsk: Stalker. p. 635. ISBN 966-696-779-0.
- Bondarenko, S. (2006). Compiled by S. Bondarenko (ed.). Неизвестные Стругацкие [Unknown Strugatskys]. Worlds of the Strugatsky Brothers (From "Monday Starts on Saturday..." to "The Inhabited Island": drafts, manuscripts, variants ed.). Donetsk: Stalker. p. 524. ISBN 966-696-938-6.
- Bondarenko, S.; Kurilsky, V. (2008). Неизвестные Стругацкие [Unknown Strugatskys]. Worlds of the Strugatsky Brothers. Moscow, Donetsk: AST, NKP. p. 640. ISBN 978-5-17-053845-4.
- Skalandis, Ant (2008). Братья Стругацкие [The Strugatsky Brothers]. Moscow: AST. p. 702. ISBN 978-5-17-052684-0.
- Snigirev, A.V. (2016). "Ранние рассказы братьев Стругацких: становление со/авторства" [Early Stories of the Strugatsky Brothers: The Formation of Co-authorship]. Pushkinskie Chteniya-2016. Khudozhestvennye Strategii Klassicheskoy I Novoy Literatury: Zhanr, Avtor, Tekst: Materialy XXI Mezhdunarodnoy Nauchnoy Konferentsii: 282–290.
- Snigirev, A. V. (2017). "Рассказ братьев Стругацких «Человек из Пасифиды»: текст и контекст" [The Strugatsky Brothers' Story "The Man from Pasifida": Text and Context]. Pushkinskie Chteniya-2017. Khudozhestvennye Strategii Klassicheskoy I Novoy Slovesnosti: Zhanr, Avtor, Tekst: Materialy XXII Mezhdunar. Nauch. Konf: 109–119.
- Strugatsky, A.; Strugatsky, B. (2000). Собрание сочинений: В 11 т [Collected Works in 11 Volumes] (Volume 1: 1955—1959 ed.). Donetsk, St. Petersburg: Stalker, Terra Fantastica. p. 672. ISBN 966-596-446-1.
- Strugatsky, A.; Strugatsky, B. (2001a). Собрание сочинений: В 11 т [Collected Works in 11 Volumes] (Volume 2: 1960—1962 ed.). Donetsk, St. Petersburg: Stalker, Terra Fantastica. p. 592. ISBN 966-596-447-X.
- Strugatsky, A.; Strugatsky, B. (2001b). Собрание сочинений: В 11 т [Collected Works in 11 Volumes] (Volume 3: 1961—1963 ed.). Donetsk, St. Petersburg: Stalker, Terra Fantastica. p. 704. ISBN 966-596-448-8.
- Strugatsky, A.; Strugatsky, B. (2001c). Собрание сочинений: В 11 т [Collected Works in 11 Volumes] (Volume 11: Unpublished. Publicism ed.). Donetsk, St. Petersburg: Stalker, Terra Fantastica. p. 736. ISBN 966-596-456-9.
- Strugatsky, A.; Strugatsky, B. (2015a). Полное собрание сочинений в тридцати трёх томах [Complete Collected Works in Thirty-Three Volumes] (Volume 1: 1941—1957 ed.). Group "Lyudeny". p. 416.
- Strugatsky, A.; Strugatsky, B. (2015b). Полное собрание сочинений в тридцати трёх томах [Complete Collected Works in Thirty-Three Volumes] (Volume 2: 1958 ed.). Group "Lyudeny". p. 451.
- Tanaseychuk, A. (2016). "«Четвёртое царство» А. Н. Стругацкого: попытка вписаться в систему или карнавальная маска?" ["The Fourth Kingdom" of A. N. Strugatsky: An Attempt to Fit into the System or a Carnival Mask?]. М. М. Бахтин в современном мире [M. M. Bakhtin in the Modern World] (Materials of the VI International Saransk Bakhtin Readings dedicated to the 120th anniversary of the scholar's birth, Saransk, November 25-26, 2015 ed.). Saransk: National Research Mordovia State University named after N. P. Ogarev. pp. 227–232. ISBN 978-5-7103-3227-6.
