= Mikhail Tsetlin =

Russian poet and editor

Mikhail Osipovich Tsetlin
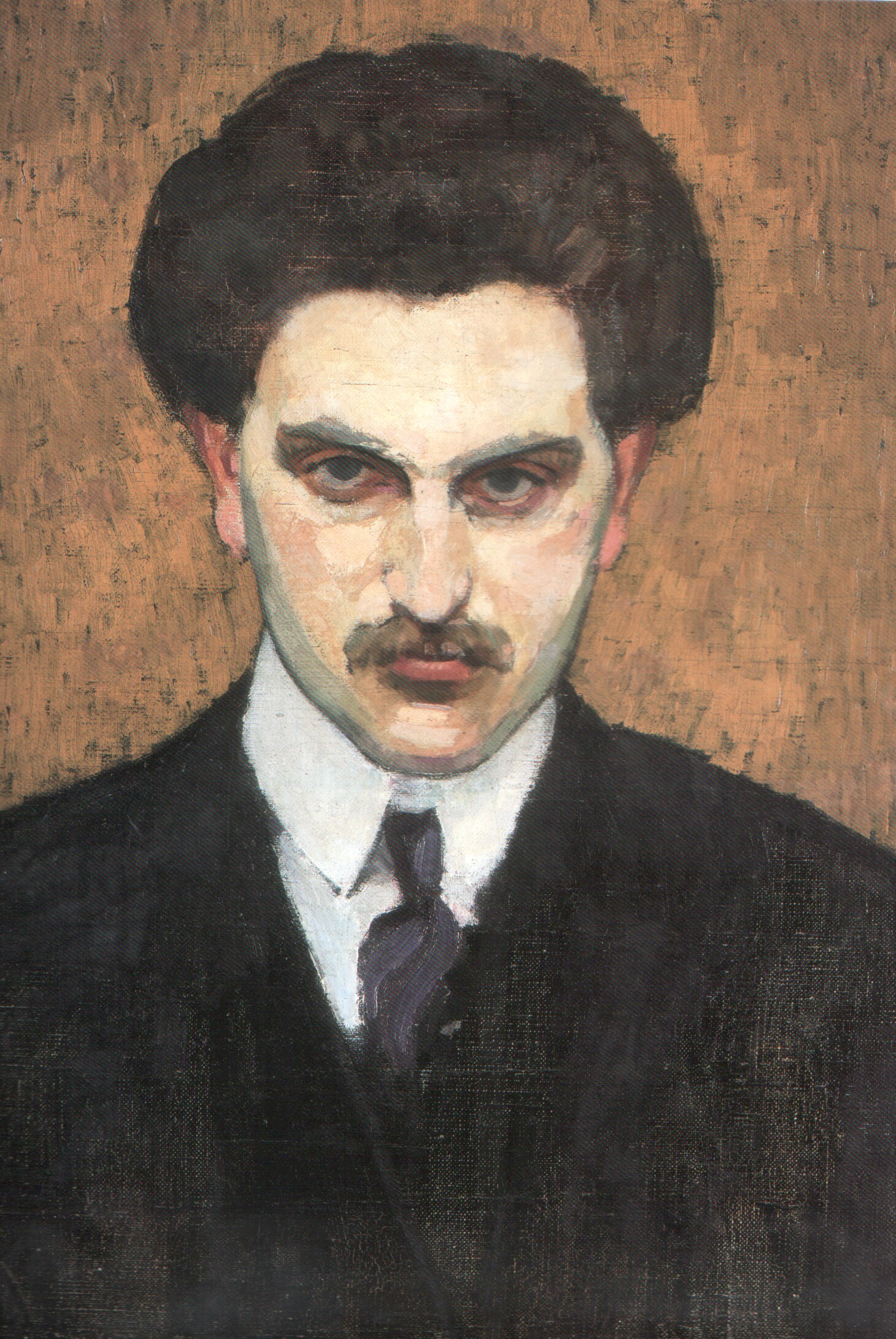
- 1910s portrait (unknown author)
- Born: Михаил Осипович Цетлин; July 10, 1882; Moscow, Russian Empire
- Died: October 10, 1945 (aged 63); New York, United States
- Occupations: poet, memoirist, editor, philanthropist, revolutionary activist (1905-1907)

Mikhail Osipovich Tsetlin (Russian: Михаи́л О́сипович Це́тлин, July 10, 1882, Moscow, Russian Empire, — November 10, 1945, New York City, United States) was a Russian poet, dramatist, novelist, memoirist, revolutionary and translator better known under his pen name Amari (Амари). In the late 1918, facing persecution by the Bolsheviks (as a former SR Party activist), Tsetlin left the Soviet Russia for France. In 1923, he founded Okno literary magazine, which published three issues and was later re-established by Tsetlin's distant relative, the poet Anatoly Kudryavitsky as a web-only journal after a lapse of some 83 years. In Paris, Tsetlin's home was open to Russian émigré artists, for whom he often provided. He earned respect as a philanthropist and a literary entrepreneur. In 1940 Tsetlin moved to the USA where he, together with Mark Aldanov, founded Novy Zhurnal (Новый Журнал) magazine in 1942.

Mikhail Tsetlin (writing under the pseudonym Amari) is the author of five poetry collections (the debut one, published in 1906, was banned in 1912 for having "a revolutionary content"), biographical prose (The Decemberists, 1933; The Five and the Others, 1944; memoirs on Maximilian Voloshin) and numerous translations, e.g. of poems by Percy Bysshe Shelley, Emile Verhaeren, Heinrich Heine, Friedrich Hölderlin, Rainer Maria Rilke, Paul Valéry, Hayim Nahman Bialik, etc.
