= Conquest of America (disambiguation) =

The Conquest of America is a name given to the European colonization of the Americas.

The term may also refer to:

- Conquest of America (miniseries), a 2005 TV miniseries
- The Conquest of America: The Question of the Other, a 1982 book by Tzvetan Todorov
- Conquest of America, a play-by-mail game by Agents of Gaming later renamed to Continental Conquest.
