= Maria Montessori (film) =

2023 film directed by Léa Todorov

- Theatrical release poster
- Directed by: Léa Todorov
- Written by: Léa Todorov; Catherine Paillé (collaboration)
- Produced by: Grégoire Debailly
- Starring: Jasmine Trinca; Leïla Bekhti
- Cinematography: Sébastien Goepfert
- Edited by: Esther Lowe
- Production companies: Geko Films; Tempesta
- Distributed by: Ad Vitam
- Release dates: 5 October 2023 (Zurich); 13 March 2024 (France)
- Running time: 114 minutes
- Countries: France; Italy
- Languages: French; Italian
- Budget: €3.6 million
- Box office: US$4.5 million

Maria Montessori (French: La Nouvelle Femme, lit. 'The New Woman') is a 2023 French–Italian historical drama film written and directed by Léa Todorov. The film stars Jasmine Trinca as Maria Montessori and Leïla Bekhti as a fictionalised woman who seeks her help. It is the director's second film.

Maria Montessori premiered in October 2023 at Zurich Film Festival and was distributed in France on 13 March 2024.

== Plot ==
The courtesan Lili d'Alengy is at the height of her fame at the beginning of the 20th century. After the death of her mother, she has to take over the upbringing of her disabled daughter Tina herself. In order to protect her reputation and hide Tina, whom she has always passed off as her niece, the Parisian demimondaine flees to Rome, where the young doctor Maria Montessori and her partner Giuseppe Montesano run a "Pedagogical Institute" for disabled children. Montessori also developed a method to help children with learning difficulties. Lili would prefer to simply drop the girl off there; because there is only one place available for day care, she ultimately stays in Rome.

Maria and Giuseppe have a son of their own, little Mario. Because an illegitimate relationship would not be accepted by society, he has to be brought up by a wet nurse in the countryside. Even the conservative doctors are slow to change their minds, but Maria has to convince them of her approach in order to receive funding. Lili wants to continue to be perceived in Paris as a "Donna Nuova", a modern, emancipated woman. During her stay in Rome, she also looks for lovers. She is delighted when Tina starts to make progress. The contact with other children and the music are visibly good for the girl, a success of Montessori's methods. Lili realizes how important attention, patience and love are in raising children.

When she breaks up with Giuseppe, who fears for his reputation, and he reveals that he is about to marry another woman, which would mean Maria would be separated from Mario, she breaks down; however, Lili sticks by her and introduces her new friend to the art of self-promotion. This gives Maria the self-confidence she needs to assert herself in the male world of science, where Montesano has always won the laurels. Together with Lili and Betsy, she creates a network that gives them independence and stands for a new pedagogy focused on the love of children and the independence of their minds.

== Cast ==
- Jasmine Trinca as Maria Montessori
- Leïla Bekhti as Lili d'Alengy
- Rafaëlle Sonneville-Caby as Tina d'Alengy
- Raffaele Esposito as Giuseppe Montesano, the husband of Maria Montessori
- Pietro Ragusa as the prince
- Agathe Bonitzer as Clarisse
- Sébastien Pouderoux as Jean Itard, the doctor
- Laura Borelli as Carlotta
- Nancy Huston as Betsy
- Raffaella Ducrey Giordano as Anna
- Georgia Ives as Giorgia
- Stefano Abbati as Professor Lombroso
- Gianfranco Poddighe as Guido Baccelli, a doctor
- Renato Sarti as Alessandro Montessori, the father of Maria Montessori
- Patrizia La Fonte as Renilde Montessori, the mother of Maria Montessori and wife to Alessandro Montessori
- Daniela Macaluso as Sarta
- Roberto Zibetti as the journalist
- Irina Valvilova as the Russian at Betsy
- Luciana Castelluci as Ms. Montesano
- Emily Di Ronza as a student

== Production ==
=== Development and casting ===
The film was directed by Léa Todorov who also wrote the screenplay. She reportedly spent a whole year researching and incorporated several biographies and contemporary witness reports into her work. La Novelle Femme is regarded as Léa's second feature film, following the 2012 documentary Saving Humanity During Office Hours.

The French actress Leïla Bekhti, known for her roles in the films All That Glitters (2010) and The Source (2011) plays the role of the courtesan Lily d'Alengy and Raffaelle Sonneville-Caby plays her daughter Tina, both of which are fictional characters. The Italian actress Jasmine Trinca portrays Maria Montessori and Raffaele Esposito portrays her life partner Giuseppe Montesano. Other cast members included Laura Borelli, Nancy Huston, Agathe Bonitzer and Sébastien Pouderoux. The approximately 30 children who appeared in the film were mostly either neuro-atypical or had minor or major motor disorders. "We gave them much more credit than society normally does," said Todorov about their participation.

== Release ==
The film premiered on 5 October 2023 at the Zurich Film Festival. The first trailer was presented at the beginning of February 2024. The film was theatrically distributed in Germany on 7 March 2024 by Neue Visionen. On 13 March 2024, the film was distributed by Ad Vitam in French cinemas.

== Reception ==
In his review at outnow.ch, Giancarlo Schwendener writes that Léa Todorov has succeeded in creating a hussar's play, and with La Nouvelle Femme she has staged a historical film, making affection, the most important component of the Montessori method, the actual leading role.

The film portrays Montessori as driven by feminist convictions. Sortir à Paris wrote: "La Nouvelle Femme explores not only the challenges facing women in a male-dominated society but also the power of friendship and mutual support. The film is an ode to female resilience and the ability to change the course of history, despite personal and professional obstacles."

In her review for Filmdienst, Kira Taszman writes that the film's feminist approach rarely comes across as didactic or even obtrusive. Based on two very different women, the historical drama tells of female emancipation in a world dominated by men. The film's clever approach is to show two contrasting types of motherhood in a society characterized by rigid moral concepts, in which even supposedly progressive men fall back into conservative role models. Women are generally not taken seriously and have to organize themselves in order to be recognized and supported.

In her review at Filmstarts, Gaby Sikorski notes the clever construction of the two women's stories told in parallel, which is the best thing about this film alongside the acting performances of the leading actresses, which ultimately glorifies the role of the mother and, especially towards the end, goes quite offensively in the direction of emotional confessional cinema.

The Institut für Kino und Filmkultur recommended the film as grade 9 in regard to social studies and social sciences, pedagogy, history, philosophy and ethics.
