= Okno (Russian magazine) =

Russian literary magazine

- Logo by Christine Zeytounian-Belous
- Editor: Anatoly Kudryavitsky
- Frequency: Online
- Founded: 1923/2007
- Final issue: 1924/2014
- Based in: Paris
- Language: Russian

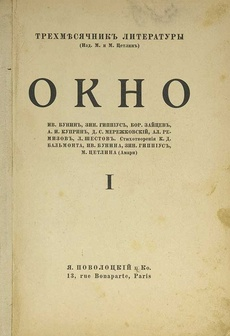
The front cover of Okno Almanac No 1, 1923

Okno Magazine (Russian: Журнал "Окно", literally "Window") was one of the Russia's leading literary magazines, founded in 1923 in Paris by Mikhail Tsetlin, the Russian émigré writer. Three paper-based issues were published in 1923 and in 1924. In 2007 Okno was re-established as a web-only magazine of poetry in Russian. It published Russian poetry, including prose poems and visual texts, translations of poetry from other languages into Russian, as well as literary heritage and essays/articles on poetry. Since autumn 2010 Okno was also publishing fiction, e.g. novellas, short stories and fragments of novels. The magazine was edited by Anatoly Kudryavitsky, a distant relative of Mikhail Tsetlin, and had some well-established poets, e.g. Konstantin Kedrov, Sergey Biryukov and Elena Katsuba, on the editorial board. Dmitri Bavilsky, the prominent Russian novelist and critic, joined the editorial team as the fiction editor in summer 2010. As per the magazine website, it stopped publication in 2014.
