= Omon Ra =

1992 novel by Viktor Pelevin

- First American edition, hardcover
- Author: Victor Pelevin
- Original title: Омон Ра
- Translator: Andrew Bromfield
- Language: Russian / English
- Series: Novaya volna russkoy fantastiki
- Genre: Science fiction, absurdist fiction, satire
- Publisher: Tekst
- Publication date: 1992
- Publication place: Russia
- English publication date: 1994
- Media type: Print (Hardcover)
- Pages: 285
- ISBN: 5-87106-022-6
- OCLC: 33440144
- LC Class: PG3485.E38 O46 1993

Omon Ra (Russian: «Омон Ра») is a short novel by Russian writer Victor Pelevin, published in 1992 by the Tekst Publishing House in Moscow. It was the first novel by Pelevin, who until then was known for his short stories.

Pelevin traces the absurd fate of the protagonist Omon, named by his policeman father (after OMON, Soviet and Russian special police forces, pronounced "Amon"), placing him in circumstances that are both fantastic and at the same time have recognizable everyday detail. Pelevin uses this story to illustrate the underlying absurdity of the Soviet establishment with its fixation on "heroic achievements", especially in those fields of human endeavor which could be favorably presented to the outside world—science, the military, and most significantly space exploration.

The book met with a significant success in the early post-Soviet cultural landscape and continues to be reprinted. An excerpt under the name "Lunokhod" was published in 1991 in the magazine Knowledge is Power and in the collection Blue Lantern. A variation of the book was published in the magazine The Banner in 1992. In 1993 the book was awarded with two literary prizes, the "Interpresson" and the "Bronze Snail".

== Plot summary ==
The book is narrated in the first person. It is a coming-of-age story, or Bildungsroman. The protagonist is Omon Krivomazov, who was born in Moscow post-World War II. The plot traces his life from early childhood. In his teenage years, the realization strikes him that he must break free of Earth's gravity to free himself of the demands of the Soviet society and the rigid ideological confines of the state. After finishing high school, he immediately enrolls in a military academy. Omon soon finds that the academy does not, in fact, create future pilots, but instead exposes cadets to a series of treacherous trials, beginning with the amputation of both of their feet. The goal of the trials is to manifest Soviet heroism in the cadets. These amputations come as a reference to a famous Soviet ace-pilot Alexey Maresyev, who, despite being badly injured in a plane crash after a dogfight, managed to return to Soviet-controlled territory on his own. During his 18-day-long journey, his injuries deteriorated so badly that both of his legs had to be amputated below the knee. Desperate to return to his fighter pilot career, he subjected himself to nearly a year of physical therapy and exercise to master control of his prosthetic devices. He succeeded and returned to flying in June 1943.

Before any intentional amputation can occur, Omon and his friend are whisked out of the academy into a top-secret installation, located under KGB headquarters in Moscow. There, they start preparing for a supposedly uncrewed mission to the Moon. Omon is told that to substitute for researching, building and launching an automated probe, the Party prefers to use people, trained for "heroism", to fulfill the tasks nominally performed by machines, such as rocket stage separation, space vehicle course correction and so on.

Soon Omon indeed seems to be launched to the Moon, strapped into a seat inside a Lunokhod, which he is meant to drive like a bicycle on the lunar surface. He is the final piece in a multi-stage mission to deliver a radio beacon to a specific point on the Moon and activate it. This he does, even though once he leaves the confines of the hermetically sealed Lunokhod, his protection against the vacuum and the interstellar cold consists of a cotton-filled overcoat and "special hydrocompensatory tampons" (which are really just oiled cotton balls) stuffed up his nose. However, when the time comes for Omon to shoot himself after he places the beacon, according to his orders, the gun he was given for the purpose misfires. Omon finds himself not on the Moon at all, but in an abandoned subway tunnel, where he had been driving his Lunokhod all along, ignoring all signs which might have given him a clue as to his real whereabouts. He tries to escape and is chased and shot at, but he manages to find his way into the "normal" world again, coming up into one of the stations of the Moscow Metro.

One of Omon's "teachers" explains the idea behind the charade: even if the fact that the Soviet Union is a champion of peaceful space exploration holds true only inside a person's head (namely, the hero's; no one knows of him or his mission apart from its organizers), this is not any different from it being the reality. The reality, when it concerns subjects not capable of being experienced, is in fact only a perception formed in people's consciousness, and can be manipulated to the extent that the question of "true" version of events becomes meaningless.

== Title ==
The title, Omon Ra, refers to the main character's given and chosen names. Omon's first name comes from the acronym for a branch of the Russian police force. It was given to him by his father. Ra is an allusion to the Egyptian Sun god, whose body is human and whose head is that of a falcon. Omon bestowed this surname upon himself, inspired by the fact that the word falcon was sometimes applied to cosmonauts and heroes. Ra is connected with the Egyptian myth of the Sun orbiting the Earth, which connects to Omon's obsession with spaceflight. Later, Ra becomes his call sign for the lunar mission. Together these names relate to Omon's dream of flight and the absurd military system he must go through to achieve it.

== Major characters ==
Omon Ra (Omon Krivomazov)
Raised by the Soviet apparatus due to his apathetic aunt and absent father, Omon dreams of becoming a cosmonaut. He enters the Soviet space program and is selected for a special program. In the novel, Pelevin gives sacred significance in the eyes of the philistines of the time being described to the personalities of the era who are the reference points, these are: Alexei Maresiev, Alexander Matrosov, and the literary character Pavel Korchagin. With these people in one way or another associate themselves with the flight school cadets, teachers, the leadership of the special mission and its participants. At the same time, the main character, Omon Krivomazov, in contrast to everything else around him, associates himself with the Egyptian sun god Ra. Throughout the story, the hero unconsciously searches for the divine beginning, the soul, which is marked by a reference to Dostoyevsky's novel in his surname. It is this beginning, and by no means the heroic one, that turns out to be the main one, and ultimately helps Omon to escape from the space of "doom for the feat". Pelevin characterizes the hero's inner world with signs - details: there is the invariable "soup with macaroni stars", burlesquely indicating the desire for heights, and the plasticine cosmonaut from the plywood rocket in the canteen - a simulacrum of the space feat.
Mitiok
Omon's friend, who also dreams of going into space. He was executed after the "reincarnational test" which "revealed" that he had been a Nazi officer in his previous life.
Colonel Urchagin
Blind and paralyzed graduate of the military political academy named after Pavel Korchagin, the protagonist of the novel How the Steel was Tempered (his injury is the reference to the author of the novel Nikolai Ostrovsky, who also became blind and paralyzed due to his illness), he is the idealistic leader of the Soviet space program. He tells Omon that “just one pure soul is enough for the banner of triumphant socialism to be unfurled on the surface of the distant moon.”

== Themes ==
Throughout much of the novel, Pelevin establishes space travel as a metaphor for maturation and heroism as one for responsibility. In the beginning of the novel, Omon straddles the boundary between childhood and adulthood. He yearns to become a cosmonaut and a hero; however, when he has the opportunity to do so, he realizes that heroism is nothing but a glorified illusion. Although children believe that the world holds an infinite number of opportunities for adults, they eventually learn that the responsibility adults have is extremely constraining rather than liberating.

== Adaptations ==
Marcel Dorney's theatrical adaptation of Omon Ra was performed by the Restaged Histories Project in Brisbane, Australia in 2006.
