= Anatoly Kudryavitsky =

Russian-Irish novelist, poet, literary translator and magazine editor

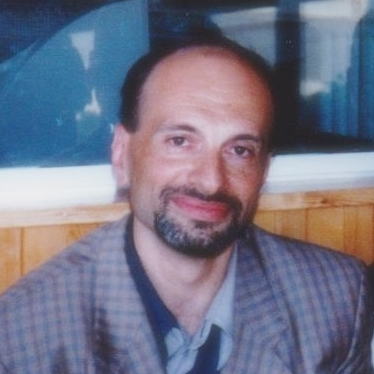
- Kudryavitsky in Ireland, 2001
- Born: 17 August 1954 (age 72); Moscow, Russian SFSR, Soviet Union
- Citizenship: Russian Federation, Republic of Ireland
- Education: PhD
- Alma mater: Moscow Medical Academy
- Occupations: Writer, chief editor
- Writing career
- Language: English, Russian
- Years active: since 1978
- Period: Contemporary
- Genres: Poem; haiku; prose poetry; novel; novella; short story; children's; translations; editorial
- Movements: Magic realism; Neo-surrealism
- Website: kudryavitsky.survisionmagazine.com

Anatoly Kudryavitsky (Russian: Анатолий Исаевич Кудрявицкий; born 17 August 1954) is a Russian-Irish novelist, poet, editor and literary translator.

== Biography ==
Kudryavitsky's father, Jerzy, was a Ukrainian-born Polish naval officer who served in the Russian fleet based in the Far East, while his mother Nelly Kitterick, a music teacher, was the daughter of an Irishman from County Mayo who ended up in one of Joseph Stalin's concentration camps. His aunt Isabel Kitterick, also a music teacher as well as a musicologist, published a critically acclaimed book titled Chopin's Lyrical Diary. Having lived in Russia and Germany, Kudryavitsky now lives in South Dublin.

=== Samizdat writer ===
Educated at Moscow Medical University, Kudryavitsky later studied Irish history and culture. In the 1980s he worked as a researcher in immunology, a journalist, and a literary translator. He started writing poetry in 1978, but under the communists was not permitted to publish his work openly. American poet Leonard Schwartz described him as

"a samizdat poet who had to put up with a good deal of abuse during the communist period and who has only been able to publish openly in recent years. In his 'poetics of silence' the words count as much for the silence they make possible as for what they say themselves"

=== In Russia after 1989 ===
Since 1989, Kudryavitsky has published a number of short stories and seven collections of his Russian poems, the most recent being In the White Flame of Waiting (1994), The Field of Eternal Stories (1996), Graffiti (1998), and Visitors' Book (2001). He has also published translations from English into Russian of such authors and poets as John Galsworthy (Jocelyn), William Somerset Maugham (Up at the Villa), Stephen Leacock (Selected Stories), Arthur Conan Doyle (Selected Stories), Emily Dickinson (Selected Poems); Stephen Crane (Collected Poems), Jim Morrison (Selected Poems), all in book form.

From 1993 till 1995 he was a member of the Meloimaginists poetry group. In the mid-1990s he edited the literary magazines Strelets/The Archer and Inostrannaya Literatura/Foreign Literature, as well as Poetry of Silence (A & B Press, 1998), an anthology of new Russian poetry. Two other anthologies, Zhuzhukiny Deti (NLO Publications, 2000), an anthology of Russian short stories and prose miniatures written in the second half of the twentieth century, and the anthology titled Imagism (Progress Publishing, 2001) were published more recently. The latter won The Independent/Ex Libris Best Translated Poetry Book of the Year Award in 2001. Kudryavitsky is a member of the Russian Writers' Union and Irish and International PEN. In 1998 he founded the Russian Poetry Society and became its first President (1998–1999). Joseph Brodsky described him as "a poet who gives voice to Russian Silence".

=== In the West ===
After moving to Ireland in 2002, Kudryavitsky has written poetry, including haiku, predominantly in English, but continues to write fiction in Russian. Between 2006 and 2009 he worked as a creative writing tutor giving classes to members of Ireland's minority language communities. His book of English poems entitled Shadow of Time (2005) was published in Ireland by Goldsmith Press. Irish poet Iggy McGovern mentioned Shadow of Time among the best Irish books of the year (Poetry Ireland Review Newsletter, January/February 2006). A Night in the Nabokov Hotel, the anthology of contemporary Russian poetry translated into English by Kudryavitsky, was published in 2006 by Dedalus Press. He has translated more than forty contemporary Irish, English and American poets into Russian, and his own work has been translated into nine languages. He won the Edgeworth Prize for Poetry in 2003, and in 2017, the Mihai Eminescu Poetry Prize in Romania. In 2007, he re-established Okno, a Russian-language poetry magazine, as a web-only journal after a lapse of some 83 years, and edited it until 2014.

In 2008, Kudryavitsky's novel titled The Case-Book of Inspector Mylls was published in Moscow by Zakharov Books. This satirical novel is set in London, and bears the markings of the magic realism genre. In early 2009, another magic realist work of his, a novella entitled "A Parade of Mirrors and Reflections", appeared in "Deti Ra", a Russian literary magazine. In this novella, Yuri Andropov undergoes cloning. Kudryavitsky's other novella titled "A Journey of a Snail to the Centre of the Shell" appeared in the same "Deti Ra" magazine in July 2010. It is an extended haibun about the life and writings of a fictitious 19th-century Japanese haiku poet.

His second novel, The Flying Dutchman, the first part of which has appeared in Okno magazine, was published in book-form in 2013. The work of magic realism has a subtitle, "A Symphonic Poem", and is written as a narrative mosaic of episodes set in both real and surreal worlds. It is about a Russian musicologist living in the 1970s and researching into the operas based on the old legend of the Flying Dutchman. He suddenly finds himself in trouble with the KGB, survives an attempt on his life and has to go into hiding. He escapes to a remote Russian province and rents an old house located on the bank of a big Russian river, where he lives like a recluse, observing nature and working on his new book. The house, which used to be an old barge, undergoes strange metamorphoses, rebuilding itself as a medieval ship. After some time the Russian police and the KGB locate his new whereabouts, put him under surveillance, and later figure out his identity. Now he is facing a choice between staying in the real world and escaping into another reality on board the Flying Dutchman's ship.

The English translation of his third novel, Shadowplay on a Sunless Day, has been published in England by Glagoslav Publications in autumn 2013, simultaneously with the Russian edition, under one cover with his novella "A Parade of Mirrors and Reflections". The book titled "DisUNITY" was launched at the Frankfurt Book Fair 2013. The novel narrates about life in modern-days Moscow and emigrant life in Western Germany, and deals with problems of self-identification, national identity and the crises of the generation of "new Europeans".

According to Dublin Review of Books,

Kudryavitsky explores and exposes the complexities of immigrant experience and identity, and the often arbitrary and dubious desires of a society to improve itself through selection and exclusion.

Carol Ermakova wrote the following in The Linguist:

Kudryavitsky's work is often poetic, even lyrical, and one of the stylistic devices he often makes use of is the extended metaphor, often in association with the personification of nature. Another common theme is the overlap of the real/surreal, the merging of "waking reality" and the dream, and the juxtaposition of the beautiful and the grotesque.

Kudryavitsky was one of the judges for the 2010 International Dublin Literary Award.

=== Haiku involvement ===
Kudryavitsky started writing haiku in Ireland. From 2007 till 2022 he edited Shamrock Haiku Journal. In 2006, he founded the Irish Haiku Society with Siofra O'Donovan and Martin Vaughan. He is the current chairman of the society.

In 2007, one of his haiku won Honourable Mention at the Vancouver International Cherry Blossom Festival. In the same year he was awarded Capoliveri Haiku 2007 Premio Internazionale di Poesia (International Haiku Award, Italy). In 2008, he won the Suruga Baika Haiku Prize of Excellence (Japan) with the following haiku:

sheep unmoved
in the green grass...
a slow passing of clouds

In 2012, he won the Vladimir Devide International Haiku Award (Osaka, Japan) with the following haiku:

on the steps
of the Freedom Memorial,
a discarded snake skin

In 2014, he won that award for the second time, with the following haiku:

Fathers’ Day –
children measure old oaks
by the length of their arms

He has translated haiku from several European languages into English.

His haiku collection titled Capering Moons (2011) was short-listed for the Haiku Foundation Touchstone Distinguished Book Award 2011. In 2012, he edited an anthology of haiku poetry from Ireland, Bamboo Dreams, which was short-listed for the Haiku Foundation Touchstone Distinguished Book Award 2012, and in 2016, an anthology of new haiku writing from Ireland, Between the Leaves (Arlen House). The same year Red Moon Press (USA) published his collection of haiku and related poems titled Horizon. In 2020, a book of his new and selected haiku and haibun entitled Ten Thousand Birds was published in India by Cyberwit Press.

In his interview for the Haiku International Association website he said the following:

"Haiku writing seems to be intuitive. Also, it changes a haiku poet’s personality. Succumbing to the habit of self-observation, a poet can trace those changes in himself. This will probably give him a chance to look into himself, to connect with his inner self in this way…"

=== Surrealist poet ===
His other poems published since 2015, especially the ones included in his chapbook entitled Stowaway and his 2019 collection, The Two-Headed Man and the Paper Life, have been described as Surrealist. According to the critic Michael S. Begnal, reviewing Kudryavitsky's Stowaway, "his style is abstract... Alliteration and sibilance lead the way to a spectacular image. He is interested in the way images and language both construct our perception of the world, of consciousness." Another critic noted that in his work, "ever-present is a tension between abstraction and reality, a questioning of the existence of Truth."

Since 2017 Kudryavitsky has been editing SurVision Magazine, an international online outlet for Surrealist poetry, which also has a book-publishing imprint, SurVision Books.

=== Translator ===
He edited and translated into English four anthologies of Russian poetry and anthologies of contemporary German and Ukrainian poetry published in the UK and Ireland. In 2020, he won the English PEN Translate Award for Accursed Poets, his anthology of dissident poetry from Soviet Russia.

== Bibliography ==
=== Novels ===
- Истории из жизни сыщика Мыллса (The Case-Book of Inspector Mylls) (Moscow, Zakharov Books, 2008)
- Летучий Голландец (The Flying Dutchman) (Moscow, Text Publishers, 2013), EKSMO BOOKS, 2019; English translation: Glagoslav Publications, London, 2018.
- Игра теней в бессолнечный день (Shadowplay on a Sunless Day). (Moscow, Text Publishers, 2014). English translation: Glagoslav Publications, London, 2013.

=== Novellas and short stories ===
- Парад зеркал и отражений: повести и рассказы (A Parade of Mirrors and Reflections: Novellas and Short Stories) - Moscow, Text Publishers, 2017. English translation of A Parade of Mirrors and Reflections in DisUNITY, Selected Novels by Anatoly Kudryavitsky. London, Glagoslav Publications, 2013) ISBN 978-1-78267-106-0
- Поездка в Где-нас-нет (A Passage to the Unknown). Novellas and Short Stories. Elephant Publishing, New Jersey, USA, 2011 ISBN 978-1-257-68299-7
- Dream. After Dream Novellas (in English translation). Honeycomb Press, Dublin – New York, 2011. ISBN 978-1-4478-6503-2

=== In English ===
==== Books ====
- Scultura involontaria (English, with Italian translations). Multimedia Edizione, Italy, 2020. ISBN 978-88-86203-97-5
- Ten Thousand Birds: New and Selected Haiku and Haibun (Cyberwit Press, India, 2020) ISBN 978-93-90202-25-6
- The Two-Headed Man and the Paper Life (MadHat Press, Cheshire, Massachusetts, USA, 2019) ISBN 978-1-941196-87-8
- Horizon (haiku and haibun; Red Moon Press, USA, 2016) ISBN 978-1-9368486-6-9
- Capering Moons (haiku; Doghouse Books, Tralee, Ireland, 2011) ISBN 978-0-9565280-2-5
- Morning at Mount Ring (haiku; Doghouse Books, Tralee, Ireland, 2007) ISBN 978-0-9552003-5-9
- Shadow of Time (Goldsmith Press, Newbridge, Ireland, 2005) ISBN 1-870491-13-0

==== Chapbooks ====
- Stowaway (SurVision Books, Dublin, 2018) ISBN 978-1-9995903-4-5
- Ship of Fools (Origami Poems Project, USA, 2021)

=== In Russian ===
- В белом огне ожиданья (In the White Flame of Waiting) Sov-VIP Press, Moscow – Oslo, 1994
- Поле вечных историй (The Field of Eternal Stories) Third Wave, Moscow/Jersey City, N.J., 1996
- Граффити (Graffiti) Third Wave, 1998
- Книга для посетителей (Visitors' Book) Third Wave, 2001
- Голоса Хроноса (Voices of Chronos. Selected Poems 1990 – 2011) Lynx Press, Dublin, 2011. ISBN 978-1-4478-6279-6
- Ветер зеленых звезд (The Wind from the Green Stars. New and Selected Poems.) DOOS Books, Moscow, 2015. ISBN 978-5-9906507-5-6
- Книга гиммиков, или Двухголовый человек и бумажная жизнь (The Book of Gimmicks, or The Two-Headed Man and the Paper Life. Selected Prose poems.) Evgeny Stepanov Publishing, Moscow, 2017. ISBN 978-5-91865-463-7
- Очертания (Outline) Free Poetry, Cheboksary – Moscow, 2020

=== Limited edition publications ===
- Осенний корабль (The Ship of Autumn) (UDN University Press, Moscow, 1991)
- Запечатанные послания (Sealed Up Messages) (Valentine Books, Moscow, 1992)
- Звезды и звуки (Stars and Sounds) (Lenore Books, Moscow, 1993)
- Between the Lines (Third Wave, 1997)

=== In translation ===
- Bărbatul cu două capete și viața de hârtie ("The Two-Headed Man and the Paper Life"). Translated into Romanian. Editura Revers, Romania, 2017. ISBN 978-606-41-0277-5
- Scultura involontaria Translated into Italian (bilingual English/Italian). Casa della poesia, Italy, 2020. ISBN 978-88-86203-97-5

=== Anthologies edited ===
- Poetry of Silence (A&B Press, Moscow, 1999)
- Zhuzhukiny Deti. Russian Short Stories in the Second Half of the 20th Century (NLO Books, Moscow, 2000)
- Bamboo Dreams. An Anthology of Haiku Poetry from Ireland. (Doghouse Books, Ireland, 2012)
- Between the Leaves. An Anthology of New Haiku Writing from Ireland. (Arlen House, Dublin, 2016)
- Seeds of Gravity. An Anthology of Contemporary Surrealist Poetry from Ireland. (SurVision Books, Dublin, 2020) ISBN 978-1-912963-18-8

=== Anthologies edited and translated ===
- Imagism, an anthology. (Progress Publishing, Moscow, 2001)
- A Night in the Nabokov Hotel. 20 Contemporary Poets from Russia in English Translation. (Dedalus Press, Dublin, 2006)
- Coloured Handprints. 20 Contemporary German-Language Poets in English Translation. (Dedalus Press, Dublin, 2015) ISBN 978-19102511-1-9
- The Frontier: 28 Contemporary Ukrainian Poets in English Translation. An Anthology. (Glagoslav Publications, UK, 2017) ISBN 978-19114144-8-3
- Mirror Sand: An Anthology of Russian Short Poems in English Translation. (Glagoslav Publications, UK, 2018) ISBN 978-19114147-2-8
- message-door: An Anthology of Contemporary Surrealist Poetry from Russia. (SurVision Books, Ireland, 2020) ISBN 978-1-912963-17-1
- Accursed Poets: Dissident Poetry from Soviet Russia 1960-80 (Smokestack Books, UK, 2020) ISBN 978-191613929-9

=== Translations of poetry ===
- Sergey Biryukov. Transformations, transl. from Russian (with Erina Megowan). (SurVision Books, Ireland, 2018) ISBN 978-1-9995903-5-2
- Alexander Korotko. Irrazionalismo, transl. from Russian (SurVision Books, Ireland, 2019) ISBN 978-1-912963-06-5
