= Zakharov Books =

Russian publishing house

Zakharov
- Industry: publication
- Founded: 1998
- Founder: Igor Zakharov
- Headquarters: Moscow, Russia
- Area served: Commonwealth of Independent States
- Website: http://www.zakharov.ru

Zakharov Books (Russian: Издательство Захаров) is a Russian independent publishing house.

Founded by the journalist Igor Zakharov in 1998 as a small independent publishing company, they gradually developed into a notable publisher of popular and literary fiction. At the very beginning of their existence as an independent publishing, they discovered Boris Akunin, and they still hold the rights to his best-selling books about Inspector Fandorin that have been translated into most European languages. More than seven million copies of these books were sold in Russia alone. Among their other authors they list such writers as Vladimir Sorokin, Venedikt Erofeyev, Sergey Gandlevsky, Vera Pavlova and Anatoly Kudryavitsky. Zakharov Books also publish translated fiction, memoirs and biographies.
