= The Mark of the Angel =

1998 novel by Nancy Huston

- First edition cover
- Author: Nancy Huston
- Original title: L'Empreinte de l'ange
- Publisher: Actes Sud
- Publication date: June 5, 1998
- English publication date: 15 October 1999
- ISBN: 978-2-742-71773-6

The Mark of the Angel (French: L'Empreinte de l'ange) is a 1998 novel by Canadian writer Nancy Huston. It was originally published in French, appearing under the title L'Empreinte de l'Ange. Both editions were nominated in Canada for a Governor General's Award in 1998 and 1999 respectively. The English edition was also a nominee for the Giller Prize in 1999.

== Plot ==
Set in 1950s Paris against the backdrop of the French-Algerian conflict, the book tells the story of an affair between its two main protagonists; Saffie, the young German wife of renowned French musician Raphael Lepage; and Andras, a Hungarian-Jewish instrument repairer living in the city's Mairie immigrant district.

When they first meet, both Andras and Saffie have been separately damaged by the events of the Second World War, but as their relationship develops over a period of several years, they are both able to begin to come to terms with the harrowing experiences that have shaped their lives – while around them a new generation is committing a fresh batch of atrocities. Ultimately, though, Saffie and Andras's affair has tragic consequences for everyone involved.

== Publication details ==
- Huston, Nancy. (1998) The Mark of the Angel. ISBN 0-09-928364-6

== Awards and honours ==
Awards for The Mark of the Angel
Year	Award	Result	Ref.
1999	Scotiabank Giller Prize	Shortlist	
1998	Governor General's Award for French-language fiction	Shortlist	
1999	Governor General's Award for French to English translation	Shortlist	
