= Fault Lines (novel) =

2007 novel by Nancy Huston

- Author: Nancy Huston
- Language: English
- Publication date: 2006 (French); 2007 (English)
- Publication place: Canada
- Pages: 334
- ISBN: 978-1-55278-664-2

Fault Lines is a novel by Canadian author Nancy Huston, published in English in 2007 by Atlantic Books. Originally published in French before it was translated to English by the author, it won the 2006 Prix Femina and was shortlisted for the Prix Goncourt and Women's Prize for Fiction.

== Summary ==
The novel is a family history divided into four quarters. A six-year-old child narrates each quarter and each narrator is a member of the same family. The narrative runs backwards, explaining the history of the family.

== Reception ==
Fault Lines received mixed feedback from critics. Joanna Briscoe's review in The Guardian was mixed, stating that Fault Lines was impressive but "utterly fails to move" and calling it an "accomplished novel whose soul is missing".

Writing in The New York Times, Susann Cokal criticised the book's prose style but praised its perspectives.

The Jewish Book Council described Fault Lines as "masterful, complex, and creative".

== Awards ==
Originally published in French under the name Lignes de Faille, Fault Lines won the 2006 Prix Femina and was shortlisted for the Prix Goncourt. Following its translation into English, Fault Lines was shortlisted for the Women's Prize for Fiction in 2008.
