= Tzvetan Todorov =

Bulgarian-French literary scholar et al (1939–2017)

- Цветан Тодоров
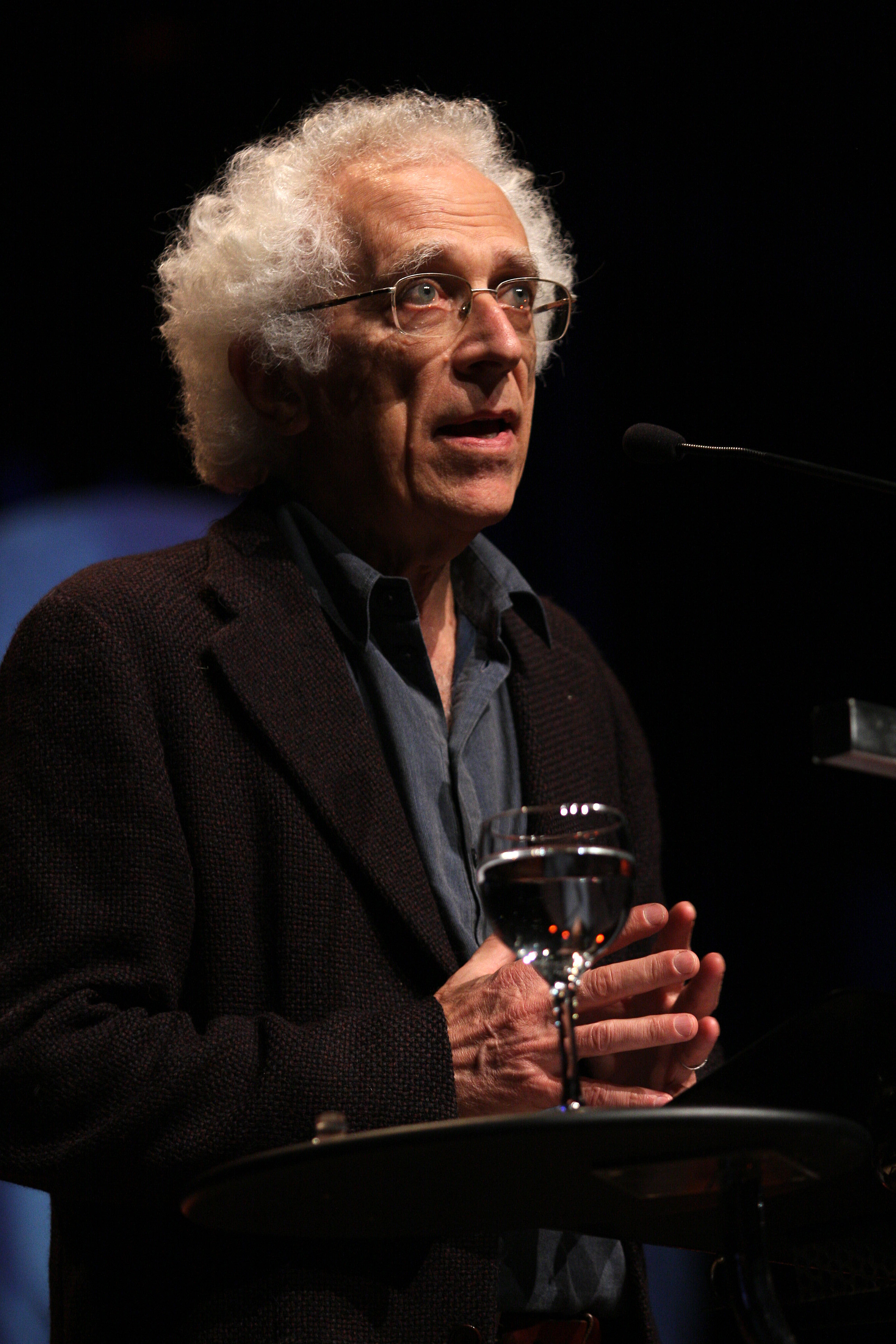
- Todorov in 2012
- Born: 1 March 1939; Sofia, Tsardom of Bulgaria
- Died: 7 February 2017 (aged 77); Paris, France
- Spouses: Martine van Woerkens; Nancy Huston (div. 2014)
- Children: 3, including Léa Todorov
- Awards: CNRS Bronze Medal; Prince of Asturias Award

Education
- Education: University of Sofia; University of Paris
- Doctoral advisor: Roland Barthes

Philosophical work
- Era: Contemporary philosophy
- Region: Western philosophy
- School: Continental philosophy; Structuralism
- Institutions: CNRS
- Notable students: Élisabeth Roudinesco
- Main interests: Literary criticism
- Notable ideas: The Fantastic

Signature
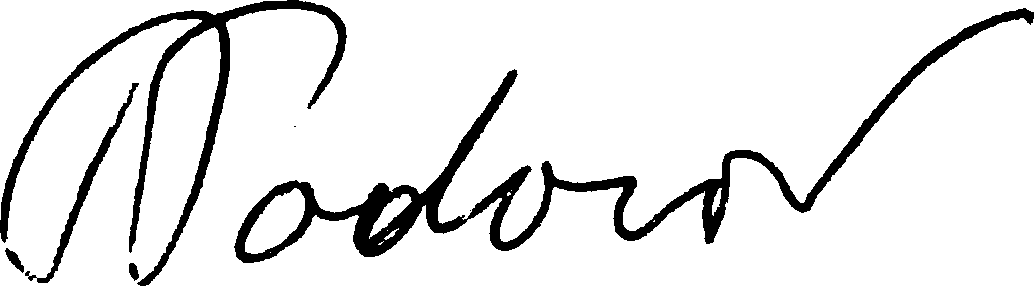

Tzvetan Todorov (/ˈtɒdərɔːv, -rɒv/; French: [tsvetan tɔdɔʁɔv, dzve-]; Bulgarian: Цветан Тодоров [ˈtɔdorof]; 1 March 1939 – 7 February 2017) was a Bulgarian-French historian, philosopher, structuralist literary critic, sociologist and essayist. He was the author of many books and essays, which have had a significant influence in anthropology, sociology, semiotics, literary theory, intellectual history and culture theory.

== Early life ==
Tzvetan Todorov was born on 1 March 1939 in Sofia, Bulgaria. He earned an M.A. in philology at the University of Sofia in 1963. He enrolled at the University of Paris to do his doctorat de troisième cycle (equivalent to the Ph.D.) in 1966 under Roland Barthes and his doctorat ès lettres in 1970.

== Career ==
Todorov was appointed to his post as a director of research at the CNRS in 1968. In 1970, he helped to found the journal Poétique, of which he remained one of the managing editors until 1979. With structuralist literary critic Gérard Genette, he edited the Collection poétique, the series of books on literary theory published by Éditions du Seuil, until 1987. He was a visiting professor at several universities in the US, including Harvard, Yale, Columbia and the University of California, Berkeley.

Todorov published a total of 39 books, including The Poetics of Prose (1971), Introduction to Poetics (1981), The Conquest of America: The Question of the Other (1982), Mikhail Bakhtin: The Dialogical Principle (1984), Facing the Extreme: Moral Life in the Concentration Camps (1991), On Human Diversity (1993), A French Tragedy: Scenes of Civil War, Summer 1944 (1994), Voices from the Gulag: Life and Death in Communist Bulgaria (1999), Hope and Memory (2000), Imperfect Garden: The Legacy of Humanism (2002), In Defence of the Enlightenment (2009), Memory as a Remedy for Evil (2010), The Totalitarian Experience (2011), The Inner Enemies of Democracy (2014) and Insoumis (2015). Todorov's historical interests focused on such crucial issues as the conquest of the Americas and the German Nazi concentration camps.

Todorov's greatest contribution to literary theory was his definition, in Introduction à la littérature fantastique (1970), of the Fantastic, the fantastic uncanny, and the fantastic marvelous. Todorov defines the fantastic as being any event that happens in our world that seems to be supernatural. Upon the occurrence of the event, we must decide if the event was an illusion or whether it is real and has actually taken place. Todorov uses Alvaro from Jacques Cazotte's Le Diable amoureux as an example of a fantastic event. Alvaro must decide whether the woman he is in love with is truly a woman or if she is the devil.

Upon choosing whether the event was real or imaginary, Todorov says that we enter into the genres of uncanny and marvelous. In the fantastic uncanny, the event that occurs is actually an illusion of some sort. The "laws of reality" remain intact and also provide a rational explanation for the fantastic event. Todorov gives examples of dreams, drugs, illusions of the senses, madness, etc. as things that could explain a fantastic/supernatural event. In the fantastic marvelous, the supernatural event that occurs has actually taken place and therefore the "laws of reality" have to be changed to explain the event. Only if the implied reader cannot opt for one or the other possibility is the text purely fantastic.

Aside from his work in literary theory, Todorov also published studies of philosophy. He wrote Frail Happiness about the writings of Jean-Jacques Rousseau. He focuses on Rousseau's ideas of attaining human happiness and how we can live in 'modern' times.

In one of his major works, Facing the Extreme, Todorov asks whether it is true the Nazi concentration camps and the Soviet Gulags revealed that in extreme situations "all traces of moral life evaporate as men become beasts locked in a merciless struggle for survival" (31–46). That opinion is commonplace of popularized accounts of the camps, and also appears in accounts of survivors themselves. Primo Levi, quoted in Todorov, writes that camp life is a "continuous war of everyone against everyone." To survive, all dignity and conscience had to be sacrificed and everyone is alone. Reports from gulag survivors are similar. However, in his reading of actual survivor testimonies, Todorov says the picture is not that bleak, that there are many examples of inmates helping each other and showing compassion in human relationships despite the inhumane conditions and terror. Survivors point out that survival always depended on the help of others. He concludes that life in the camps and gulag did not follow the law of the jungle and that the counter-examples are numerous, even in Levi's work.

Todorov's honors included the CNRS Bronze Medal, the Charles Lévêque Prize of the Académie des sciences morales et politiques and the first Maugean Prize of the Académie française and the Prince of Asturias Award for Social Sciences; he was also an Officer of the Ordre des Arts et des Lettres. He was an elected member of both the American Philosophical Society and the American Academy of Arts and Sciences. He also received the Prince of Asturias Award for Social Sciences. In 2015, he was awarded the [Wayne C. Booth] Award for lifetime achievement in narrative studies by the International Society for the Study of Narrative.

== Personal life and death ==
Tzvetan Todorov was born in the family of Todor Borov, a Bulgarian linguist and intellectualist from the early 20th century. His brother is the Bulgarian mathematician and theoretical physicist Ivan Todorov.

Todorov was married twice. His first wife was the scholar Martine van Woerkens, with whom he had a son, Boris. His second was Canadian novelist and essayist Nancy Huston, with whom he had two children, daughter Léa and son Sacha; he and Huston divorced in 2014. He died on 7 February 2017, at the age of 77.

== Bibliography ==
Books

- Grammaire du Décaméron (1967)
- Introduction à la littérature fantastique (1970), translated by Richard Howard as The Fantastic: A Structural Approach to a Literary Genre in 1973
- Poétique de la prose (1971), translated as The Poetics of Prose in 1977
- Introduction to Poetics (1981)
- Theories of the Symbol (1982), translated by Catherine Porter
- Symbolism and Interpretation (1982), translated by Catherine Porter
- Conquest of America: The Question of the Other (1984), translated from the French by Richard Howard
- Mikhail Bakhtin: the dialogical principle (1984), translated by Wlad Godzich
- Literature and its Theorists: A Personal View of Twentieth-Century Criticism (1987), translated by Catherine Porter
- Genres in Discourse (1990), translated by Catherine Porter
- On human diversity: nationalism, racism, and exoticism in French thought (1993), translated by Catherine Porter
- French tragedy: scenes of civil war, summer 1944 (1996), translated by Mary Byrd Kelly; translation edited and annotated by Richard J. Golsan
- Voices from the Gulag: Life and Death in Communist Bulgaria (1999), Tzvetan Todorov (ed.); translated by Robert Zaretsky
- A Passion for Democracy: Benjamin Constant (1999), translated by Alice Seberry
- Facing the extreme: moral life in the concentration camps (2000), translated by Arthur Denner and Abigail Pollack
- Fragility of goodness: why Bulgaria's Jews survived the Holocaust (2001), a collection of texts with commentary by Tzvetan Todorov
- Life in common: an essay in general anthropology (2001), translated by Katherine Golsan and Lucy Golsan; with a new afterword by the author
- Frail Happiness: An Essay on Rousseau (2001), translated by John T. Scott and Robert D. Zaretsky
- Imperfect garden: the legacy of humanism (2002), translated by Carol Cosman
- Hope and memory: lessons from the twentieth century (2003), translated by David Bellos (French: Mémoire du mal, tentation du bien, 2000)
- New world disorder: reflections of a European (2005), preface by Stanley Hoffmann; translated by Andrew Brown
- Torture and the War on Terror (2009), translated by Gila Walker
- In Defence of the Enlightenment (2009), translated by Gila Walker
- The fear of barbarians: beyond the clash of civilizations (2010), translated by Andrew Brown
- Memory as a Remedy for Evil (2010), translated by Gila Walker
- Muros caídos, muros erigidos (2011), translated by Zoraida de Torres Burgos
- The Totalitarian Experience, translated by Teresa Lavender Fagan. Kolkata, India: Seagull Books, 2011
- The Inner Enemies of Democracy, translated by Andrew Brown. Cambridge, UK and Malden, MA: Polity Press, 2014
- Insoumis: essai. Paris: Robert Laffont: Versilio, 2015

Articles

- "Humanisme, libéralisme et esprit des Lumières, entretien de Karim Emile Bitar avec Tzvetan Todorov ('Humanism, Liberalism and the Spirit of the Enlightenment')" (in French). L'ENA hors les murs. June 2007.
- "'L'esprit des Lumières a encore beaucoup à faire dans le monde d'aujourd'hui' ('The Spirit of the Enlightenment still has a lot to do in today's world')" (in French). Le Monde. 4 March 2006.
- "In search for lost crime: Tribunals, apologies, reparations, and the search for justice" (PDF). The New Republic. 26 January 2001.

== See also ==
- Genre studies
- The Possibility of Hope
