= Léa Todorov =

French writer and filmmaker (born 1982)

- Born: 1982 (age 43–44); Paris, France
- Occupations: Writer; filmmaker
- Parents: Tzvetan Todorov (father); Nancy Huston (mother)

Léa Todorov (born in 1982 in Paris, France) is an actress, writer and film director, known for Maria Montessori (2023), Saving Humanity During Office Hours (2012) and Memoir of War (2017).

She is daughter of the Bulgarian philosopher Tzvetan Todorov and the Canadian novelist Nancy Huston.
