= Mark Aldanov =

Russian writer and critic

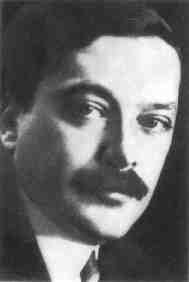
- Born: Mordkhai-Markus Israelevich Landau; 7 November [O.S. 26 October] 1886; Kiev, Russian Empire
- Died: 25 February 1957 (aged 70); Nice, France
- Writing career
- Genres: Biography, fiction, criticism, essays

Mark Aldanov (Russian: Марк Алда́нов; Mordkhai-Markus Israelevich Landau, Mark Alexandrovich Landau, Russian: Мордхай-Маркус Израилевич Ландау, Марк Алекса́ндрович Ланда́у; 7 November [O.S. 26 October] 1886 – February 25, 1957) was a Russian and later French writer and critic, known for his historical novels.

Aldanov's first book about Vladimir Lenin, translated into several languages, immediately gained him popularity. Then followed a trilogy of novels attempting to trace the roots of the Russian Revolution. He also wrote a tetralogy of novels about Napoleonic Wars. All in all, he published 16 larger literary works and a great number of articles and essays. He was nominated for the Nobel Prize in Literature thirteen times.

== Biography ==
Mordkhai-Markus Landau (Aldanov) was born in Kiev in the family of a rich Jewish industrialist. He graduated from the physical-mathematical and law departments of Kiev University. He published serious research papers in chemistry. In 1919 he emigrated to France. During 1922-1924 he lived in Berlin and during 1941-1946, in the United States.

Ivan Bunin, the first Russian writer to win the Nobel Prize for Literature, nominated Aldanov for the Nobel Prize a total of six times - in 1938, 1939, 1947, 1948, 1949, and 1950.

Mark Aldanov died in Nice, France. His extensive correspondence with Vladimir Nabokov, Ivan Bunin, Alexander Kerensky and other emigre celebrities was published posthumously.

== Novy Zhurnal ==
In 1942, while in New York, Aldanov cofounded Novy Zhurnal (The New Review; Russian: Новый журнал) together with his colleague and friend Mikhail Tsetlin. Until November 1945, they both served as Editors-in-Chief of this publication, which is considered the oldest Russian language literary periodical in print published outside of Russia. Among the review's contributors were Vladimir Nabokov, Ivan Bunin, Joseph Brodsky, Aleksandr Solzhenitsyn, and other notable Russian emigre writers.

== The Aldanov Literary Prize ==
Since 2007, Novy Zhurnal has been awarding The Aldanov Literary Prize conferred for the best novella or novelette authored by a Russian-language writer living outside of Russia.

== Bibliography ==
=== The Thinker, a tetralogy ===
- The Ninth Thermidor
- The Devil's Bridge
- The Conspiracy
- St. Helena: Little Island

=== Novels ===
- Punch Vodka
- The Ninth Thermidor
- The Devil's Bridge
- Conspiracy
- The Tenth Symphony
- Saint Helena, Little Island
- For Thee the Best
- A Story About Death
- Before the Deluge
- Suicide
- The Key
- Escape
- The Cave
- The Fifth Seal - The Beginning of the End
- Live As You Please
- Nightmare and Dawn
- Moltke the Younger
- Querétaro and Emperor Maximilian
