= Iggy McGovern =

Iggy McGovern (born 1948 in Coleraine, Northern Ireland) is an Irish poet and an emeritus professor of physics at Trinity College Dublin.

He has written four collections of poetry and also edited a poetry anthology. In science he has published over 80 peer-reviewed articles in surface science and synchrotron radiation techniques.

== Education ==
Iggy McGovern earned his BSc (1970) and PhD (1974) in physics from Queen's University Belfast. After conducting post-doctoral research at the University of Pennsylvania, the University of Wisconsin, and the New University of Ulster, he returned to Ireland and joined the Trinity College Dublin faculty in 1979.

== Legacy ==
Iggy McGovern occupies a unique space in Irish culture as both an accomplished physicist and a celebrated poet. He has said, "I am a physicist who also writes poetry - or a poet who is also a physicist." Scientific icons from history are a recurring theme in his poetry, bringing a human and rhythmic dimension to their lives. His most acclaimed books of verse feature William Rowan Hamilton, Erwin Schrödinger, and Isaac Newton.

== Honors and awards ==
- 1986 Alexander von Humboldt Fellowship at the Fritz-Haber-Institut, Berlin, Germany.
- 1988 Visiting Fellow at Magdalen College, Oxford
- 1996 The Hennessy Award for Poetry
- 1998 Chairperson of the Thin Films & Surfaces Group of the Institute of Physics, London, United Kingdom
- 2000 Director of Advanced Materials at TCD
- 2003 Chairman of the Institute of Physics in Ireland
- 2006 Distinguished Fellow at the Institute of Advanced Studies in La Trobe University, Melbourne
- 2006 The Glen Dimplex New Writers Award for Poetry
- 2006 The Ireland Chair of Poetry Bursary
- 2015 The Alexander von Humboldt Stipendium in Physics & Poetry at Erlangen University

== Poetry collections ==
- 2005: The King of Suburbia (Dublin: Dedalus Press) ISBN 9781904556459
- 2010: Safe House (Dublin: Dedalus Press) ISBN 9781906614348
- 2012: Twenty Irish Poets Respond to Science in Twelve Lines [As editor] (Dublin: Dedalus Press) ISBN 9781906614669
- 2013: A Mystic Dream of 4: A sonnet sequence based on the life of William Rowan Hamilton (Dublin: Quaternia Press) ISBN 9780992629403
- 2017: The Eyes of Isaac Newton (Dublin: Dedalus Press) ISBN 9781910251270
- 2021: Making Waves: A sonnet sequence based on the life of Erwin Schrödinger (Dublin: Quaternia Press) ISBN 9780992629434
- 2026: Hammer and Spark (Trinity College Dublin)
