= Text Publishers =

Text
- Native name: Текст
- Industry: publication
- Founded: 1988
- Founder: a consortium of science fiction writers
- Headquarters: Moscow, Russia
- Area served: Commonwealth of Independent States
- Key people: Olgerd Libkin
- Website: textpubl.ru

Text Publishers (Russian: Издательство Текст) is one of the main Russian independent publishing houses.

Founded by a group of Russian science-fiction writers in 1988 as a small independent publishing company, they gradually developed into an important publisher of fiction that brings out about sixty books per year. At the very beginning of their existence as an independent publishing, they focused on Russian and translated science fiction. In 1991, they published collected works by Arkady and Boris Strugatsky and by the Polish writer Stanislaw Lem. In 1996, the new editorial director, Olgert Libkin, started publishing a wider range of fiction, including literary. Among their other authors they list such writers as Kir Bulychev, Evgeny Evtushenko, Gennadiy Prashkevich, Anatoly Kudryavitsky, Leonid Girshovich, and Stanislav Rassadin. Text Publishers are also prominent as publishers of translated fiction, including Samuel Beckett, Pascal Bruckner, Isaac Bashevis Singer, Jean-Marie Gustave Le Clézio and Nancy Huston. In 2006, the leading Russian literary critics, answering a questionnaire in the national newspaper Kultura, named Text Publishers as one of the top seven Russian publishing houses.
