= The Conquest of America: The Question of the Other =

1982 book by Tzvetan Todorov

- Author: Tzvetan Todorov
- Publisher: Harper & Row
- Publication date: 1982

The Conquest of America: The Question of the Other is a book by Tzvetan Todorov first published in 1982, detailing Spanish colonials' contact with natives upon the discovery of the Americas.

Todorov analyzes texts and arguments from Spanish figures such as Pedro de Valdivia and Francisco de Vitoria. Todorov argues that the latter "demolishes the contemporary justifications of the wars waged in America, but nonetheless conceives that 'just wars' are possible," to make the Spanish "not only subject to the decision but also its judge, since it is they who select the criteria according to which the judgment will be delivered; they decide, for instance, that human sacrifice is the consequence of tyranny, but massacre is not."

In his 1992 book The Apotheosis of Captain Cook (which deals with a similar theme of initial contact between Western and indigenous cultures), Princeton anthropology professor Gananath Obeyesekere describes The Conquest of America as "one of the most provocative books of our time." At the same time, Obeyesekere critiques several of the approaches taken by Todorov, specifically the latter's reliance on Spanish conquistador sources that are themselves responsible for generating stereotypical views of the "Otherness" of the native population—stereotypes that Todorov set out to counter.

Todorov's book was translated from French into English by Richard Howard.
