= Nancy Huston =

Canadian author, based in France (born 1953)

Nancy Huston OC
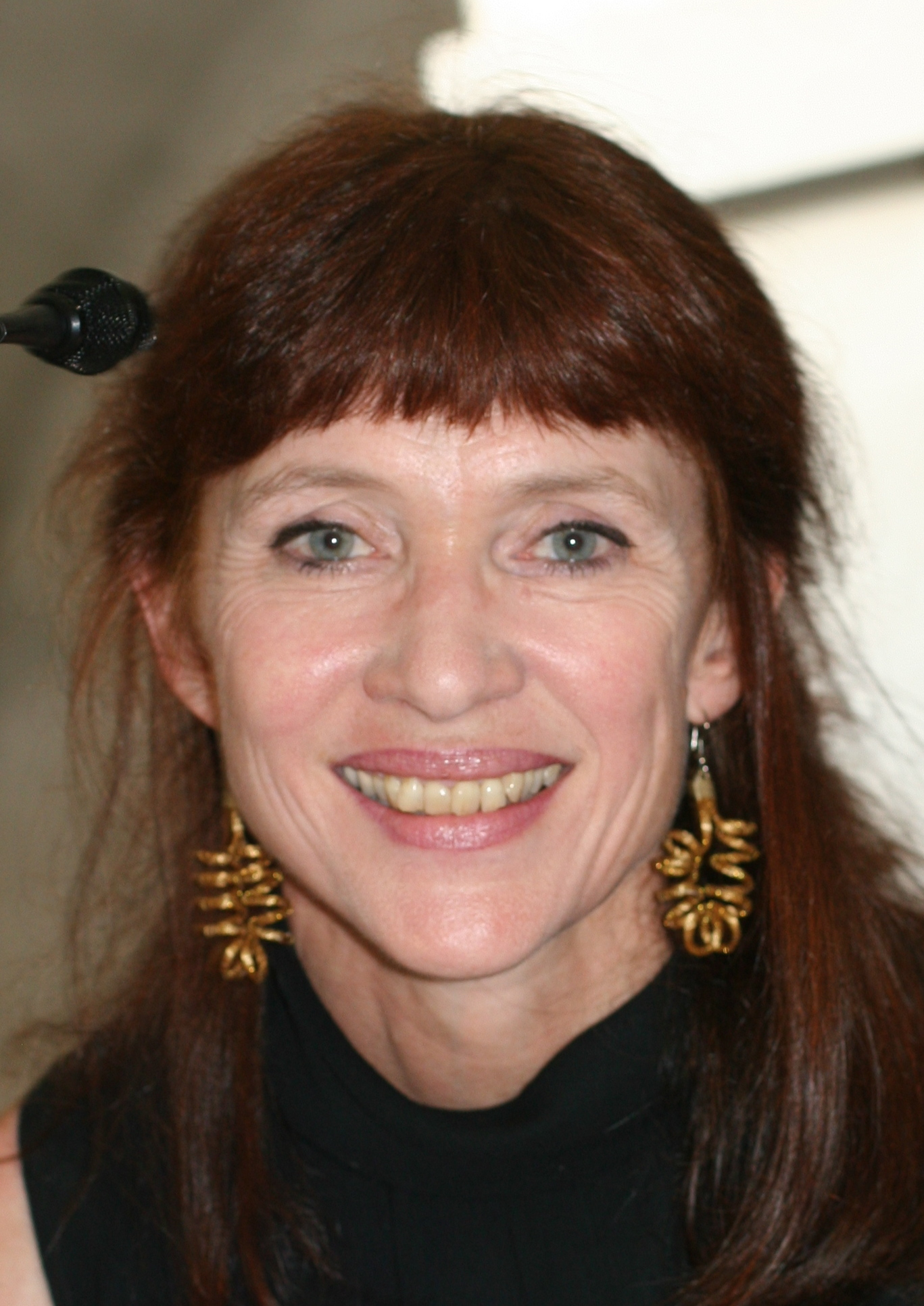
- Huston in 2008
- Born: Nancy Louise Huston; 16 September 1953 (age 73); Calgary, Alberta
- Occupations: Novelist, translator
- Spouse(s): Tzvetan Todorov (m. ??; div. 2014)
- Partner: Guy Oberson (20??–present)
- Children: two, including Léa Todorov
- Writing career
- Notable awards: Prix Femina; Grand prix des lectrices de Elle

Nancy Louise Huston (born September 16, 1953) is a Canadian novelist and essayist, a longtime resident of France, who writes primarily in French and translates her own works into English.

== Biography ==
Huston was born in Calgary, Alberta, Canada, the city in which she lived until age fifteen, at which time her family moved to Wilton, New Hampshire, where she attended High Mowing School. She studied at Sarah Lawrence College in New York City, where she was given the opportunity to spend a year of her studies in Paris. Arriving in Paris in 1973, Huston obtained a master's degree from the École des hautes études en sciences sociales, writing a thesis on swear words under the supervision of Roland Barthes.

She was the second wife of Bulgarian-French historian and philosopher Tzvetan Todorov, with whom she had two children, daughter Léa and son Sacha; she and Todorov divorced in 2014. From 2013 to 2020, Huston was in a relationship with Swiss painter Guy Oberson, with whom she also collaborated artistically.

== Career ==
Because French was a language acquired at school and university, Huston found that the combination of her eventual command of the language and her distance from it as a non-native speaker helped her to find her literary voice. Since 1980, Huston has published over 45 books of fiction and non-fiction, including theatre and children's books. Some of her publications are self-translations of previously published works. Essentially she writes in French and subsequently self-translates into English but Plainsong (1993) was written first in English and then self-translated to French as Cantique des plaines (1993) – it was, however, the French version which first found a publisher.

While Huston's often controversial works of non-fiction have been well-received, her fiction has earned her the most critical acclaim. Her first novel, Les variations Goldberg (1981), was awarded the Prix Contrepoint and was shortlisted for the Prix Femina. She translated this novel into English as The Goldberg Variations (1996).

Her next major award came in 1993 when she was received the Canadian Governor General's Award for Fiction in French for Cantique des Plaines (1993). This was initially contested as it was a translation of Plainsong (1993), but Huston demonstrated that it was an adaptation and kept the prize. A subsequent novel, La virevolte (1994), won the Prix "L" and the Prix Louis-Hémon. It was published in English in 1996 as Slow Emergencies.

Huston's novel, Instruments des ténèbres, has been her most successful novel yet, being shortlisted for the Prix Femina, and the Governor General's Award. It was awarded the Prix Goncourt des Lycéens, as well as both the Prix des lectrices (Elle Québec) and the Prix du livre Inter in 1997.

In 1998, she was nominated for a Governor General's Award for her novel L'Empreinte de l'ange. The next year she was nominated for a Governor General's Award for translating the work into English as The Mark of the Angel.

In 1999, she appeared in the film Set Me Free (Emporte-moi), also collaborating on the screenplay.

Her works have been translated into many languages from Chinese to Russian.

In 2005, she was made an Officer of the Order of Canada,

In 2006, she received the Prix Femina for the novel Lignes de faille and which, as Fault Lines, has been published by Atlantic Books and was shortlisted for the 2008 Orange Prize.

In 2007, she received an honorary doctorate from the University of Liège.

In 2010, she received an honorary doctorate from the University of Ottawa.

In 2012, she was awarded the Queen Elizabeth II Diamond Jubilee Medal. That same year, she won the Literary Review's Bad Sex in Fiction Award for her novel, Infrared.

== Critical response ==
Canadian poet and critic Frank Davey in "Big, Bad and Little Known: The Anglophone-Canadian Nancy Huston" (2004), is critical of Huston's English writing style. In response to this, Joseph Pivato in "Nancy Huston Meets le Nouveau Roman" (2016), contends that Huston was influenced by the French writers of le Nouveau Roman and their theory of composition.

== Selected works ==
=== Fiction ===
Date of first French-language edition followed by date of first English-language edition.

- 1981 / 1996 : The Goldberg Variations — self-translation of Les Variations Goldberg

Prix Contrepoint, 1982

- 1985 / 1987 : The Story of Omaya — self-translation of Histoire d'Omaya
- 1989 / ........ : Trois fois septembre [no English version]
- 1993 / 1993 : Plainsong — self-translated into French as Cantique des plaines

Governor General's Award for French-language fiction, 1993

- 1994 / 1996 : Slow Emergencies — self-translation of La Virevolte

Prix Limoges (or Prix "L"), 1994
Prix Louis-Hémon, 1994

- 1996 / 1997 : Instruments of Darkness — self-translation of Instruments des ténèbres

Prix Goncourt des lycéens, 1996
Prix du Livre Inter, 1996
Grand prix des lectrices de Elle Québec, 1997

- 1998 / 1999 : The Mark of the Angel — self-translation of L'Empreinte de l'ange

Prix des libraires du Québec, 1999
Grand prix des lectrices de Elle, 1999

- 1999 / 2000 : Prodigy, novella — self-translation of Prodige : polyphonie
- 2001 / 2001 : Dolce Agonia, later reissued as Sweet Agony — self-translation of Dolce agonia

Prix Odyssée, 2002

- 2003 / 2003 : An Adoration — self-translation of Une adoration
- 2006 / 2007 : Fault Lines — self-translated into French as Lignes de faille — the French version was published first

Prix Femina, 2006
Prix France Télévisions, 2006

- 2010 / 2011 : Infrared — self-translation of Infrarouge
- 2013 / 2014 : Black Dance — self-translation of Danse noire
- 2016 / ........ : Le Club des miracles relatifs [no English version]
- 2019 / ........ : Rien d'autre que cette félicité, novella [no English version]
- 2021 / ........ : Arbre de l'oubli [no English version]
- 2024 / ........ : Francia [no English version]

=== Theatre ===
- Angela et Marina (2002), with Valérie Grail [no English version]
- Jocasta Regina (2010) — self-translation of Jocaste reine (2009)

=== Autobiographical writings ===
Huston calls the first instalment a récit or fact-based narrative, and the second a roman or novel.

- Bad Girl : classes de littérature (2014) [no English version]
- Lèvres de pierre : nouvelles classes de littérature (2018) [no English version]

=== Non-fiction ===
- Jouer au papa et à l'amant (1979) [no English version]
- Dire et interdire : éléments de jurologie (1980) [no English version]
- Mosaïque de la pornographie : Marie-Thérèse et les autres (1982) [no English version]
- Journal de la création (1990) [no English version]
- Tombeau de Romain Gary (1995) [no English version]
- Pour un patriotisme de l'ambiguïté (1995) [no English version]
- Losing north: musings on land, tongue and self (2002) — self-translation of Nord perdu, suivi de Douze France (1999)
- Limbes / Limbo (2000) [bilingual edition]
- Visages de l'aube (2001), with Valérie Winckler [no English version]
- Professeurs de désespoir (2004) [no English version]
- Passions d'Annie Leclerc (2007) [no English version]
- The Tale-Tellers: A Short Study of Humankind (2008) — self-translation of L'Espèce fabulatrice (2008)

=== Correspondence ===
- À l'amour comme à la guerre (1984) [no English version]
- Lettres parisiennes : autopsie de l'exil (1986), with Leïla Sebbar [no English version]

=== Selected texts ===
- Désirs et réalités : textes choisis 1978—1994 (1995) [no English version]
- Âmes et corps : textes choisis 1981—2003 (2004) [no English version]

=== Children's fiction ===
- Véra veut la vérité (1992), with Léa Todorov and Willi Glasauer [no English version]
- Dora demande des détails (1997), with Léa Todorov and Pascale Bougeault [no English version]
- Les Souliers d'or (1998) [no English version]

=== Filmography ===
- Stolen Life (1998) (as screenwriter)
