= Letter of the Seventy-Four =

Letter of the Seventy-Four (Russian: Письмо семидесяти четырёх) is a common alternative title for an open letter, a nationalistic pamphlet composed of two documents: "Letters from Russian Writers to the Supreme Soviet of the USSR, the Supreme Soviet of the RSFSR, and the Delegates of the 28th Congress of the Communist Party of the Soviet Union", signed by 74 writers, and its revised version, following the election of Mikhail Gorbachev as President of the Soviet Union: "Letters from Writers, Cultural Figures, and Scientists of Russia to the President of the USSR, the Supreme Soviet of the USSR, the Supreme Soviet of the RSFSR, and the Delegates of the 28th Congress of the Communist Party of the Soviet Union".

The latter version of the appeal was declared open for signature. The writers' attitude toward the Letter of the Seventy-Four manifested itself in the confrontation within the USSR Writers' Union and its division after the events of August 1991 into the "patriotic" Union of Writers of Russia and the "liberal" Union of Russian Writers.

== History ==
The emergence of Letter of the Seventy-Four dates back to the years preceding the collapse of the Soviet Union. Despite the remaining provision in the Constitution of the Soviet Union regarding the "leading and guiding" role of the Communist Party of the Soviet Union, the Party had by then been significantly weakened, and censorship agencies had virtually ceased to function.

Calls were made to ban the cultural and educational festival "Russian Meetings" planned for February 20–25, 1990, in Leningrad. The festival featured Valentin Rasputin, Vasily Belov, Vladimir Soloukhin, and the editors and authors of the magazines Nash Sovremennik, Moskva, and Molodaya Gvardiya as well as the newspapers Literaturnaya Rossiya and Moskovsky Literator." Opponents of the event publicly declared that it would "drive a wave of nationalism" and provoke acts of "hooliganism, violence, and, God forbid, bloodshed" Such assertions provoked a backlash. On March 2, 1990, the newspaper Literaturnaya Rossiya published a "Letter from Russian Writers to the Supreme Soviet of the USSR, the Supreme Soviet of the RSFSR, and the Delegates of the 28th Congress of the Communist Party of the Soviet Union", signed by 74 Soviet literary figures—including such renowned writers as Pyotr Proskurin, Leonid Leonov, Valentin Rasputin, Alexander Prokhanov, Yuri Loshchits, Vadim Kozhinov, Yuri Kuznetsov, and Vladimir Krupin.

After the election of the President of the Soviet Union, this text, with minor additions by Yuri Bondarev and Mark Lyubomudrov, was published under the title “Letter from writers, cultural and scientific figures of Russia to the President of the Soviet Union, the Supreme Soviet of the USSR, the Supreme Soviet of the RSFSR, and the delegates of the XXVIII Congress of the Communist Party of the Soviet Union” in the April 1990 issue of the magazine Nash Sovremennik.

== Content ==
According to the letter's authors, this label is being introduced to distract the public from external threats, justify the destruction of the Soviet Army, disavow the USSR's victory in the Great Patriotic War, and encourage citizens to "rethink and abolish as an event and a crime such a reality as treason, cooperation with foreign firms and governments based on the betrayal of our country's state interests." Overall, the document asserted, the diligently promoted phantom of "Russian fascism" was intended to "instill a guilt complex in Russians themselves, exacerbate their sense of national inferiority, completely undermine their national identity, and call into question Russian patriotism in any of its manifestations".

According to the letter's authors, after the onset of Perestroika, a campaign was launched in the "advanced" press to idealize the Jewish people "as truly internationalist, the most humane, the most talented, the most hardworking, and, moreover, as having supposedly suffered the greatest sacrifices." This campaign caused particular resentment among the signatories.

== Reaction ==
The appeal generated considerable resonance. Positive responses began arriving at the editorial office of Literaturnaya Rossiya, which the newspaper regularly published. However, there was also a negative reaction to letter from figures such as Sergei Nikolaevich Semanov, deputy chairman of the RSFSR Culture Foundation and publicist, who was not invited to sign.

Later, the publications Literaturnaya Gazeta and Izvestia were designated as "relatively neutral" for these purposes. Semanov makes no mention of the subsequent fate of the "Response to the Patriots" in his published diary.

Letter of the Seventy-Four served not only as an indicator of the prevailing mood among a number of literary figures but also as a precursor to the division of the unified community of Soviet writers, which at the time consisted of approximately 11,000 members, into two wings: the Union of Writers of Russia (UWR) and the Union of Russian Writers (SRP). The former included those who supported the authors of the Letter of the Seventy-Four while the latter included writers who generally held liberal views.

== Signatories ==
- Vitaly Maslov
- Sergey Alekseev
- Yuri Kuznetsov
- Pyotr Proskurin
- Leonid Leonov
- Vladimir Lichutin
- Viktor Likhonosov
- Karem Rush
- Fyodor Sukhov
- Anatoli Ivanov
- Mikhail Vishnyakov
- Nikolay Voronov
- Boris Bursov
- Irina Strelkova
- Viktor Kochetkov
- Vladimir Bushin
- Tatyana Glushkova
- Tamara Sablina
- Mikhail Lobanov
- Boris Lapin
- Egor Isaev
- Vladimir Bondarenko
- Anatoly Znamensky
- Sergey Lykoshin
- Oleg Mikhailov
- Anatoly Vasilevsky
- Nikolay Doroshenko
- Sergey Vikulov
- Dmitry Zhukov
- Stanislav Kitaysky
- Stanislav Kunyaev
- Eduard Skobelev
- Arseny Larionov
- Valentin Rasputin
- Yuri Prokushev
- Margarita Nogteva
- Valery Murzakov
- William Kozlov
- Yuri Sbitnev
- Apollon Kuzmin
- Rostislav Filippov
- Igor Shafarevich
- Vladislav Shapovalov
- Vadim Kozhinov
- Tatyana Chetverikova
- Alexander Prokhanov
- Viktor Petelin
- Sergey Panyushkin
- Maya Ganina
- Valentin Sorokin
- Mikhail Godenko
- Mikhail Petrov
- Sergey Voronin
- Nikolay Shundik
- Galina Litvinova
- Viktor Korotayev
- Viktor Kalugin
- Vladimir Krupin
- Yuri Borodkin
- Peter Vykhodtsev
- Grigory Kalyuzhny
- Pyotr Palamarchuk
- Alexander Bologov
- Alexander Segen
- Vladilen Mashkovtsev
- Lev Knyazev
- Oleg Kochetkov
- Vladimir Shirikov
- Viktor Smirnov
- Nikolay Kuzin
- Yuri Loschits
- Nikolay Shipilov
- Valery Rogov
- Boris Sporov
