= Valery Ganichev =

Russian writer (1933–2018)

- Валерий Ганичев
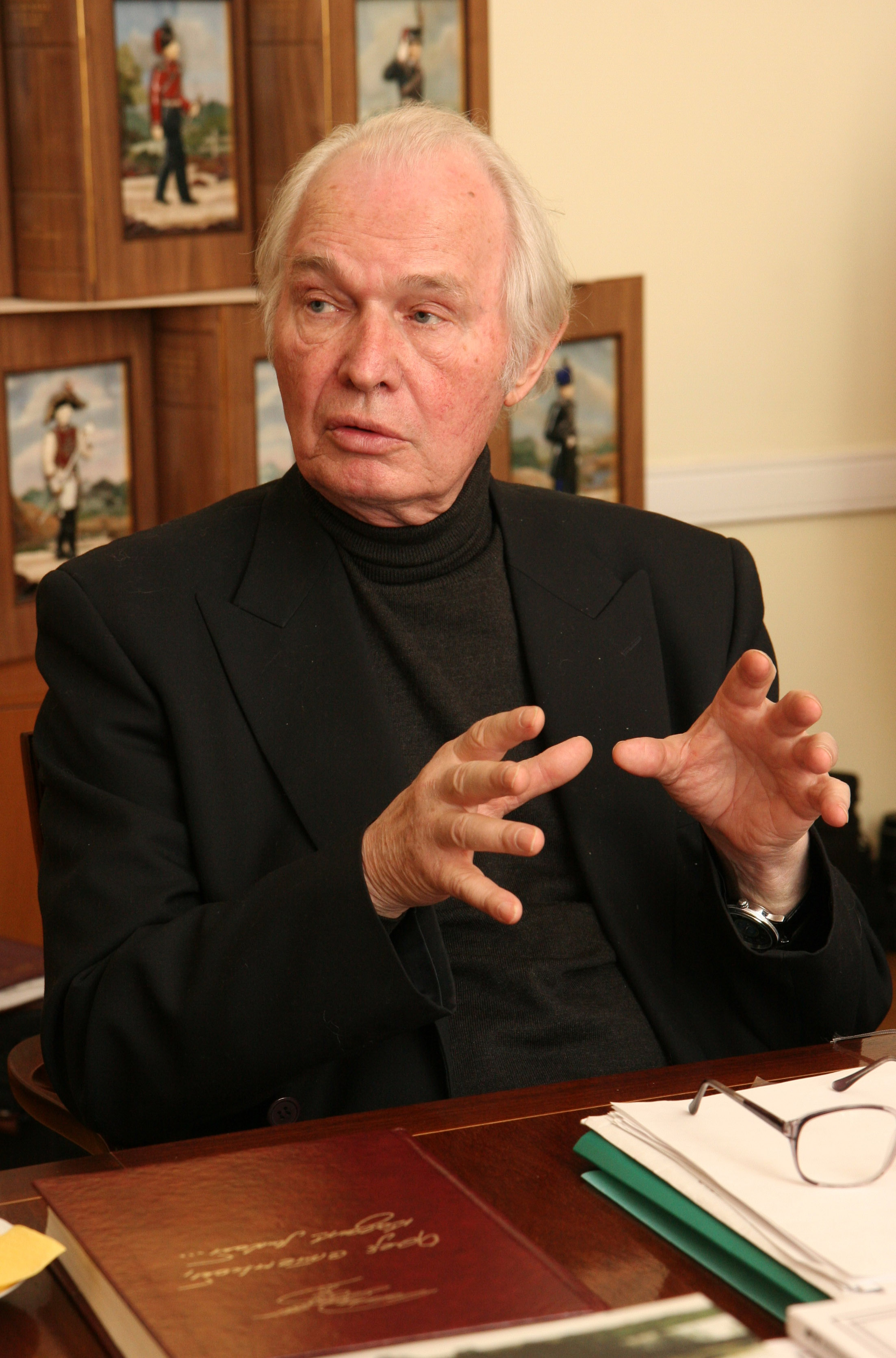
- Ganichev in 2011

Chairman of the Union of Writers of Russia
- In office 1994–2018
- Preceded by: Yuri Bondarev
- Succeeded by: Nikolai Ivanov

Personal details
- Born: 3 August 1933 Pestovo, RSFSR
- Died: 8 July 2018 (aged 84) Peredelkino, Moscow
- Resting place: Peredelkino Cemetery
- Education: Taras Shevchenko National University of Kyiv; Moscow State University

Valery Nikolayevich Ganichev (Russian: Валерий Николаевич Ганичев; August 3, 1933, Pestovo, Leningrad Oblast– July 8, 2018, Peredelkino) was a Soviet and Russian writer, journalist, public figure, Doctor of Historical Sciences (1978) who served as the chairman of the Union of Writers of Russia from 1994 to 2018. Honoured Cultural Worker of the RSFSR (1988).

== Biography ==
Half Bulgarian by ethnicity. Valery Ganichev was born on August 3, 1933, in Pestovo (now in the Novgorod Oblast). Before the Great Patriotic War, he lived in the Omsk Oblast. He graduated from high school in the Poltava Oblast.

In 1956, he graduated from the history department of Taras Shevchenko National University of Kyiv. He worked in Nikolaev.

In the early 1960s, he came under the influence of the anti-communist and Orthodox monarchist (though with numerous reservations) figures I. Glazunov and Vladimir Soloukhin. Ganichev was one of the main participants in the Russian nationalist movement known as the Russian Party, and was the generally recognized "leader" of the Russian Party. A member of the "Pavlovites", a group of Russian nationalists within the Central Committee of the All-Union Leninist Young Communist League led by its First Secretary Sergei Pavlov, a student of the "Pavlov group" ideologist A. Nikonov, and leader of the "Junior Pavlovites". Ganichev was an active participant and organizer of Pavlovite ideological initiatives targeting youth. Ganichev's group formed around the Molodaya Gvardiya publishing house and the "Russian Club" at the All-Russian Society for the Protection of Historical and Cultural Monuments, representing a friendly circle of young Orthodox anti-communist humanities scholars (historians, philologists, and literary scholars). Ganichev himself denied the existence of a Russian party, viewing the movement as a community of like-minded individuals pursuing a "Russian cause".

Ganichev actively lobbied for the interests of Ilya Glazunov and Vladimir Soloukhin, as well as the interests of their like-minded colleagues from Pyotr Palievisky's Kozhinov group. At the same time, he maintained contacts with all groups of writers, supporters of Russian nationalism, professional "anti-Zionists", as well as nationalist-minded military personnel and veterans. He published their works through the Molodaya Gvardiya publishing house. He participated in political activities associated with the apparatus of the CPSU Central Committee. Ganichev's personal patron was Viktor Golikov, an aide to Leonid Brezhnev. He participated in the activities of Mikhail Alekseyev's informal "collective farm". He was a key figure in organizing the political cover for the activities of the Russian Party.

He provided patronage to monarchist-minded figures. He recognized Stalin's contributions to the construction of the Soviet state and the struggle against the Jews. Ganichev's memoirs, which relate to his work at the magazine "Young Guard" in the mid-1960s, contain the earliest known reference to the use of the term "Kremlin wives"—Jewish wives who, according to Russian nationalists, controlled their party-government husbands.

In 1961, he approached Yuri Melentyev with a proposal to publish a book for students and became the latter's protégé. In the early 1960s, he was Anatoly Nikonov's deputy at the magazine "Young Guard".

From the late 1960s, he was closely associated with the Anti-Zionist Group. However, he did not claim to "study" Zionism and limited himself to reading, criticizing, and assisting in the publication of the works of members of the "anti-Zionist circle". Organizer of the patriotic "Soviet-Bulgarian Club of Creative Youth" with a nationalist focus, the first meeting of which was held in 1967.

From 1967 to 1968, he was head of the Propaganda and Agitation department of the Komsomol Central Committee. He was patronized by Yevgeny Tyazhelnikov (with Tyazhelnikov's appointment as First Secretary of the Komsomol Central Committee, Ganichev received the post of director of the Molodaya Gvardiya publishing house; after Tyazhelnikov's transfer in 1977 to the post of head of the propaganda department of the CPSU Central Committee, Ganichev was editor-in-chief of Komsomolskaya Pravda from 1978 to 1980). From 1968 to 1978, he was director of the Molodaya Gvardiya publishing house of the Komsomol Central Committee. The publishing house was under the control of the Russian Party. Another influential figure in the Young Guard from 1969 to 1975 was Sergei Semanov, discovered and appointed editorial director of the popular series The Lives of Remarkable People by Ganichev himself. After his departure, Ganichev retained the publishing house's second-in-command, editor-in-chief Valentin Osipov, thereby ensuring the continuity of the traditions of the "Pavlov group".

He holds a PhD in history (1972, dissertation "The System of the Komsomol Press of the USSR and Its Role in the Revolutionary Education of the Young Generation (1918-1925)"). In 1977, he defended his dissertation "Youth Press: History, Experience, Problems" at the Faculty of Journalism at Moscow State University, earning him a doctorate in history.

He was one of the main architects of the anti-liberal "campaign" of 1977–1982. The ultimate goal of this faction of the Russian Party was to fill the perceived ideological void of the Brezhnev era and occupy key positions in the ideological sphere through criticism of liberals and hidden Jews and calls for a more aggressive foreign policy course and an end to détente. The participants of the "Russian Party" did not expect more than that.

From 1978 to 1980, he was editor-in-chief of the newspaper Komsomolskaya Pravda. He was removed from this post in 1981. Commenting on these events, Alexander Yakovlev wrote: "In the spiritual atmosphere of those years, the aggressively nationalist wing saw real opportunities for practical action, but apparently acted prematurely". Ganichev's recognition as a political leader reached the point that a toast was raised to him at one banquet as the future General Secretary. Stanislav Kunyaev believed this was the reason for Ganichev's dismissal from his post as editor-in-chief of Komsomolskaya Pravda in 1980. According to Ganichev himself, the reason was the machinations of ill-wishers who misinterpreted the toast, which provoked a negative reaction from Mikhail Suslov.

From 1981 to 2001, he was editor-in-chief of the magazine Roman-Gazeta. From 1994 to 2018, he was chairman of the Union of Writers of Russia. He was also Deputy Head of the World Russian People's Council, an annual socio-political forum established and overseen by the Moscow Patriarchate.

Since 1998, he has been Editor-in-Chief of the magazine "Roman-Zhurnal. XXI Century". From 1994 to 2018, he was chairman of the Board of the Union of Writers of Russia.

In 2001, he contributed to the canonization of Fyodor Ushakov. He was a member of the "Intellectual and Business Club," headed by M. I. Kodin, which united respectable supporters of the communist-patriotic opposition.

From 2006 to 2008, he was a member of the Civic Chamber of the Russian Federation. He is Deputy Chairman of the Committee for the Defense of Russian Culture and co-chair of the Russian National School Foundation. Chairman of the Commission on Public Awards and Memorialization in the Russian Federation. Member of the Petrovskaya Academy of Sciences and Arts. Academician of non-governmental organizations: the International Slavic Academy, the International Academy of Informatization, the Academy of Creativity, and the Academy of Russian Literature.

He died on July 8, 2018, after a long illness. Russian President Vladimir Putin expressed his condolences to his relatives.

== Awards ==
=== Russian and Soviet ===
- Order of Honour (February 15, 2006) — for services to culture and art, and long-term fruitful work
- Order of Friendship (August 14, 2014) — for outstanding services to the development of Russian culture and art, television and radio broadcasting, the press, communications, and long-term fruitful work
- Honoured Cultural Worker of the RSFSR
- JJubilee Medal "100 Years of the Trans-Siberian Railway" (2001)
- Order of the Red Banner of Labour
- Two Order of the Badge of Honour
- Medal "Veteran of Labour"
- Medal "For Strengthening Military Cooperation"
- Honorary Title "Honored Worker of Culture of the RSFSR" (March 22, 1988) — for services to Soviet culture and long-term fruitful work

Lenin Komsomol Prize (1978) — for work on the history of the Komsomol and the international youth movements

- Honorary Railwayman Badge of the USSR
- Certificate of Honour of the Moscow City Duma (July 10, 2013) — for services to the city community and in connection with the anniversary

=== Foreign ===
- Francysk Skaryna Medal (Belarus, October 29, 2003) — for significant personal contribution to the development of humanitarian cooperation between the Republic of Belarus and the Russian Federation, aimed at strengthening Belarusian-Russian friendship
- Order of Labor Glory (Transnistria, October 13, 2003) — for services in the creation and development of the writers' organization of Transnistria, the promotion of literary works by Transnistrian authors in Russia, the organization of the Days of Transnistrian Literature in Moscow, and in connection with the 70th anniversary of the birth
- Medal "10 Years of the Pridnestrovian Moldavian Republic" (Transnistria, October 20, 2000) - for his significant contribution to "the development and strengthening of friendly relations and fraternal ties with the people of Transnistria"

=== Confessional ===
- Medal "For Our Friends" (award of the All-Russian public movement "Orthodox Russia")
- Order of St. Sergius of Radonezh, 2nd degree (ROC; December 6, 1999) - "In recognition of his active and fruitful participation in the work of the World Russian People's Council and in connection with the 2,000th anniversary of the Nativity of Christ"
- Order of St. Sergius of Radonezh, 1st degree (ROC, 2013) - in recognition of his labours for the good of the Church and the Fatherland and in connection with his 80th anniversary of his birth.
- Order of Holy Prince Daniel of Moscow, 2nd degree (ROC)
- Order of Saint Vladimir of the Russian Orthodox Church, 2nd degree (Russian Orthodox Church)
- Order of the Hieromartyr Isidore of Yuryev, 3rd degree (Autonomous Estonian Orthodox Church of the Moscow Patriarchate; in Tallinn, 2007) - for contribution to the creation and development of the World Russian People's Council.

=== Literary ===
- Commemorative Medal "100th Anniversary of the Birth of the Great Russian Writer, Nobel Prize Laureate M.A. Sholokhov" (Ministry of Culture and Mass Media of Russia, June 9, 2005) — for active participation in the preparation and holding of a number of events dedicated to the celebration of the 100th anniversary of M.A. Sholokhov's birth
- SPR Grand Literary Prize of Russia (2003) — for the novels "Admiral Ushakov," "Ross the Invincible," and the novella "The Road Builder"
- Alexander Green Prize (2003)
- S.T. Aksakov Literary Prize
- Prokhorovskoe Pole Literary Prize
- Dostoevsky International Literary Prize (Tallinn, 2007)
- Bunin Literary Prize (2011)
- Patriarchal Literary Prize (2014)
