= Sergey Vikulov =

Soviet-Russian poet and editor (1922–2006)

- Born: Sergey Vasilyevich Vikulov; September 13, 1922; Yemelyanovskaya, Cherepovets Governorate, Russian SFSR
- Died: July 1, 2006 (aged 83); Moscow, Russia
- Resting place: Troyekurovskoye Cemetery
- Education: Vologda State Pedagogical Institute
- Writing career
- Period: 1950s-2000s
- Genre: Poetry
- Subjects: Great Patriotic War; The life of Soviet peasantry
- Notable awards: RSFSR Gorky State Prize; Order of the Patriotic War; Order of the Red Banner of Labour; Order of Friendship of Peoples; Order of the Red Star; Order of the Badge of Honour; Medal "For the Defence of Moscow"; Medal "For the Defence of Stalingrad"; Medal "For the Victory over Germany in the Great Patriotic War 1941–1945"

Sergey Vasilyevich Vikulov (Russian: Серге́й Васи́льевич Ви́кулов; September 13, 1922 — July 1, 2006) was a Soviet and Russian poet, editor, and the Union of Soviet Writers' official.

== Biography ==
Sergey Vikulov was born in the village of Yemelyanovskaya in Cherepovets Governorate into a poor peasant family. In October 1942, he volunteered for the Soviet Army and as a flak and artillery battery commander fought at the Kalinin, then Stalingrad Fronts. Later he became the 247th Zenith and Artillery regiment's Chief of Stuff's deputy and demobilized in the rank of a Guard captain, a chevalier of several high-profile military awards, including two Orders of the Red Star.

In the late 1940s Sergey Vikulov started to write poetry. In 1951 he graduated the Vologda State Pedagogical Institute's literary faculty and became the member of the Union of Writers of the USSR. In 1972, for his poem Alone Forever (1970) as well as The Plough and the Furrow (1972) collection he was awarded the RSFSR Gorky State Prize.

In 1959-1989 Vikulov edited Nash Sovremennik, an influential conservative (neo-Slavophiliac) magazine set to propagate the traditional Russian values, as opposed to the Western-style liberal ideas. Among his best friends and allies were the authors who contributed to the magazine regularly: Viktor Astafyev, Valentin Rasputin, Fyodor Abramov, Vasily Belov, Yuri Bondarev, Vladimir Soloukhin. Several major Aleksandr Solzhenitsyn's works were published by Nash Sovremennik with Vikulov at the helm. In 1990 he joined the group of authors who signed the anti-reformist "Letter of the Seventy-Four" which led to the break up of the Union of Soviet Writers and the formation of the 'patriotic' Union of Writers of Russia and the 'democratic' Union of Russian Writers.

Sergey Vikulov died on July 1, 2006, in Moscow. He was buried at the Troyekurovskoye Cemetery.

== Select bibliography ==
=== Books of poetry ===
- Beyond the Lake (Zaozyorye, Заозёрье, 1956)
- There Will Be Good Weather (Khoroshaya budet pogoda, Хорошая будет погода, 1961)
- Bread and Salt (Khleb da sol, Хлеб да соль, 1965)
- Bird-cherry Tree By the Window (Tcheryomukha u okna, Черёмуха у окна, 1966)
- Plough and Furrow (Plug i borozda, Плуг и борозда, 1972)
- The Family Tree (Rodovoye drevo, Родовое древо, 1975)
- Trace Left in the Field (Ostalsya v pole sled, Остался в поле след, 1979)
- Green Shoots (Vskhody, Всходы, 1982)

=== Major poems ===
- In Blizzard (V metel, В метель, 1955)
- Galinka's Summer (Galinkino leto, Галинкино лето, 1957)
- Hard-earned Happiness (Trudnoye shchastye, Трудное счастье, 1958)
- By Rights of a Fellow Countryman (Po pravu zemlyaka, По праву земляка, 1961)
- The Overcoming (Preodoleniye, Преодоление, 1962)
- Windows Facing the Dawn (Oknami na zaryu, Окнами на зарю, 1964)
- Against the Skies, On Earth (Protiv neba na zemle, Против неба на земле, 1967)
- The Iv-Mountain (Iv-gora, Ив-гора, 1969)
- Forever Alone (Odna navek, Одна навек, 1970)
- The Thought of Motherland (Duma o Rodine, Дума о Родине, 1977)
