= Unpromising villages =

Soviet term for uneconomic settlements

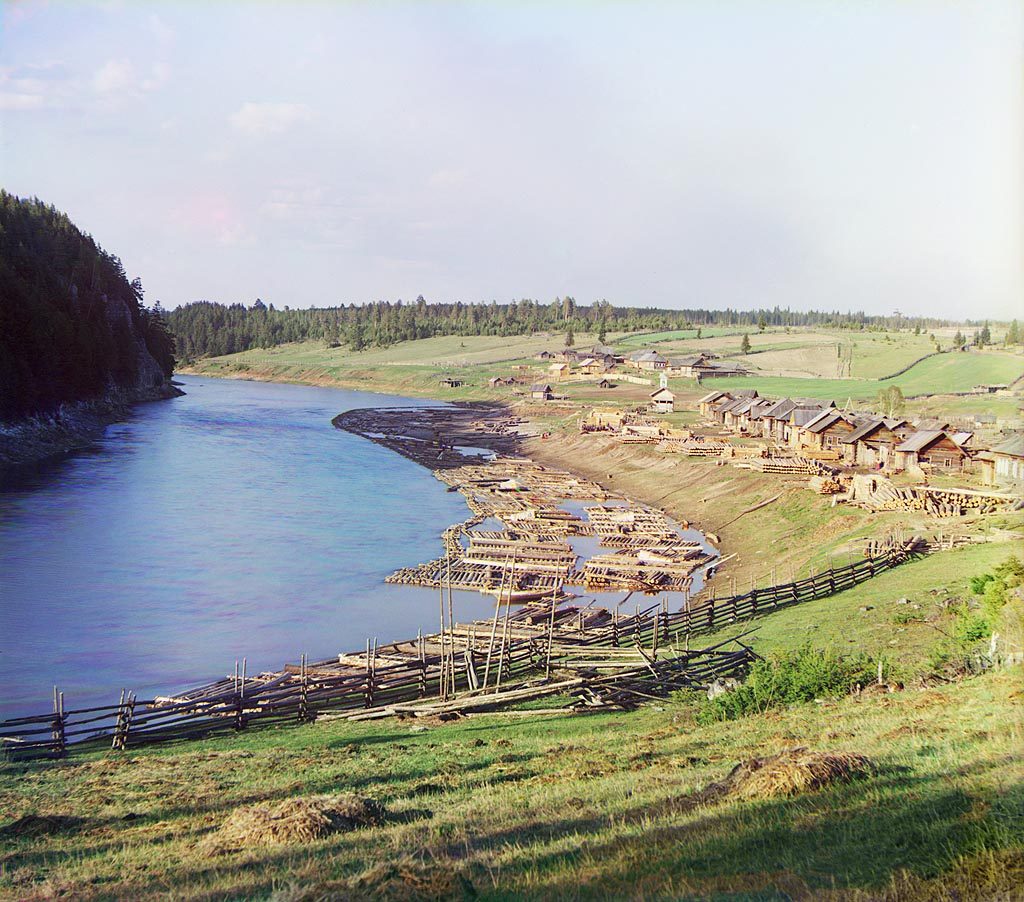
Kashka village in modern Sverdlovsk Oblast, declared unpromising in the 60s. Photo by Sergey Prokudin-Gorsky, 1912

Unpromising, or literally perspectiveless villages (Russian: неперспективные деревни) was a term used by the Soviet government in 1960s–80s referring to the small rural settlements, which were considered to be not suitable for a planned economy.

The policy of unpromising villages' liquidation included the resettlement of the residents to larger rural settlements with concentration of the bulk of the rural population, production and social facilities. The most negative social impact of this policy was the significant damage done to rural infrastructure.

== Planning ==
For the first time, the concept of "unpromising villages" was used in recommendations for the design of rural settlements. The recommendations were drawn up in 1960 by the Academy of Civil Engineering and Architecture of the USSR in accordance with the decisions of the Plenum of the Central Committee of the CPSU of December 1959 on the development of new schemes of "regional and intra-economic planning" in rural areas. According to this document, rural settlements were subdivided into two groups depending on what was their population size, how well they were provided with communications and to what extent they corresponded to the conditions of the economic development: "promising", the population of which was at least 1,000 to 1,500 people and "unpromising" with a correspondingly smaller population.

The initiators of this policy proceeded from the principle that highly concentrated forms of settlement should correspond to highly mechanized agriculture. According to the plans, each kolkhoz (collective farm) or sovkhoz (state farm) was to include one or two posyoloks with a population ranging from 1,000 to 10,000 people. A clear definition of "promising villages" was introduced, in which it was planned to relocate residents of smaller "unpromising villages" (which included up to 80% of their total number). It was assumed that this change in the settlement structure contributes to the better development of the socio-cultural and everyday life of the rural areas of the Soviet Union, bringing it closer to urban standards, as well as reducing the flow of migration to the cities.

It was originally planned that by 1979 the number of rural settlements will decrease from 705,000 to 115,000. Subsequently, in the process these numbers were constantly adjusted. On 20 March 1974, resolutions of the Central Committee of the CPSU and the Council of Ministers of the USSR were issued, according to which out of 143,000 settlements outside of the Central Black Earth economic region, 114,000 were to be liquidated and the 170,000 families were to be relocated to "comfortable kolkhoz/sovkhoz settlements", as well as to provide them with significant benefits and loans for individual construction there.

== Implementation ==
In the early stages of the project, the policy of liquidation of settlements was limited. Mostly it boiled down to the revision and re-registration of rural settlements, the design of the territorial and economic organization of the districts. Since 1968, repair works and construction were no longer carried out in settlements declared "unpromising", objects of social infrastructure (schools, shops, rural clubs and other facilities) were closed and transport links were limited. These conditions forced people to migrate.

The destruction of unpromising villages was not accompanied by the same active transformation of “promising” ones. The improvement and expansion of individual housing in the central estate (settlement where the administrative center of a kolkhoz or sovkhoz was located), was carried out with a constant lack of resources. Often, apartment blocks of urban type were provided for resettlement. Two-thirds of the settlers migrated not to "promising" rural settlements, but to regional centers, big cities and other regions of the country. The liquidation of "unpromising" settlements was carried out without taking into account the wishes of the inhabitants. Some residents perceived the resettlement negatively.

== Results ==
The reorganization was not fully implemented: there were fewer unpromising villages liquidated than planned. Nevertheless, the settlement network has undergone significant changes. Over the period of 1959–79, the number of rural settlements in Russia decreased by 60.2% to 177,100, in the USSR as a whole by 54.3%, up to 383,100. Most of the resettlement actions took place in the Non-Black Earth zone.

== Effect ==
The liquidation of unpromising villages failed to reach the initial plans and had negative socio-economic consequences for the numerous northwestern and central regions of Russia, as well as Ural and Siberia. Important aspects of the rural life were not taken into account, such as, first of all, connection of the resettled people with their personal household plots. The liquidation of small settlements led to the desolation of adjacent agricultural lands. The concentration process caused an increase in migration to major urban centers, leading to a population drop in the regions affected by the reform and demographic aging of the Russian countryside.

Public controversy unfolded on this issue. The unpromising villages liquidation program was criticized by demographer Boris Khorev and writers such as Vasily Belov, Fyodor Abramov, Valentin Rasputin, commonly known as members of Village Prose literary movement.

In 1980, by the decision of the Gosstroy's Committee for Civil Engineering and Architecture, the division of rural settlements into "promising" and "unpromising" was canceled. Nevertheless, the erosion of the rural settlement network had not stopped and small villages continued to become abandoned.

== See also ==
- Demographic crisis of Russia
- Agriculture in the Soviet Union
- Urban planning in Russia
- Urban planning in communist countries

== Literature ==
- Mazur, Lyudmila. Политика ликвидации неперспективных деревень в 1960-1970-е гг.: истоки, этапы, реализация, результаты (на материалах Урала) [The policy of liquidating unpromising villages in the 1960–1970s: origins, stages, implementation, results (based on materials from the Urals)] (PDF) (in Russian).
