= Nash Sovremennik =

Russian literary magazine founded in 1956

- Editor: Viktor Poltoratsky (1956-1958), Boris Zubavin (1958-1968), Sergey Vikulov (1969-1989), Stanislav Kunyaev (1989-present)
- Frequency: Monthly
- Circulation: 480 thousand (1990), 9 thousand (2009)
- Founded: 1956
- Country: Russian Federation
- Based in: Moscow
- Language: Russian
- ISSN: 0027-8238
- OCLC: 4895482

Nash Sovremennik (Наш современник, Our Contemporary) is a Russian literary magazine, founded in 1956, as a successor to the Yearly Almanac.

== History ==
The predecessor of Nash Sovremennik was the Maxim Gorky-founded Almanac that was coming out in 1933-1937 and in 1949-1955, 1 to 4 times a year. The Almanac's title was chronologically changing, from Year XVI (1933) to Year XXXVIII (1956), the point of reference being 1917, the year of the Socialist Revolution.

In 1956 the Almanac changed its name to Nash Sovremennik and up until 1964 was coming out as a quarterly. Initially it belonged to the Union of Writers of the USSR, since 1958 it moved under the jurisdiction of the RSFSR Union of Writers. Nash Sovremennik's first editors-in-chief were Viktor Poltoratsky (1956-1958, an editorial staff member up until 1973) and Boris Zubavin (1958-1968). In its early years the magazine had as its main purpose seeking out new literary talents in the Russian province.

In 1969 Nash Sovremennik's editor became Sergey Vikulov who gathered around him a strong team of contributors, including Fyodor Abramov, Viktor Astafyev, Valentin Rasputin, Vasily Belov, Yuri Bondarev, Sergey Zalygin, Yuri Kazakov, Viktor Likhonosov, Yevgeny Nosov, Vladimir Soloukhin, Valentin Sorokin and Vasily Shukshin. Vikulov departed in 1989, succeeded by Stanislav Kunyaev.

By this time Nash Sovremennik has found itself in the center of the bitter faction struggle in the Soviet literature and journalism, representing (alongside Moskva and Molodaya Gvardia magazines) the conservative, neo-Slavophile and Russian nationalist flank, opposing the Western-style liberalism (associated in those years with Oktyabr and Znamya, with Novy Mir balancing in the center). In 1990 it reached its highest point of popularity with the circulation figures around 480 thousand. In 1990s Nash Sovremennik became the organ of the newly formed conservative Union of Writers of Russia, a bitter rival to the pro-liberal Union of Russian Writers. Among its consistent contributors were Vladimir Bogomolov, Sergey Kara-Murza, Vadim Kozhinov, Vladimir Krupin, Yuri Kuznetsov, Mikhail Lobanov, Alexander Prokhanov and later, in the 2000s, Zakhar Prilepin, Mikhail Popov, Irina Mamayeva, Yuri Kozlov among others. Still led by Kunyayev, the magazine remains true to its once declared 'patriotic' course, but its circulation has fallen to 9 thousand, as of 2008.
