= Boris Mozhayev =

Soviet Russian author, dramatist, script-writer and editor

Boris Andreevich Mozhayev
- Born: June 1, 1923; Pitelino, Ryazan Governorate, RSFSR, USSR
- Died: March 2, 1996 (aged 72); Moscow, Russian Federation
- Writing career
- Period: 1955-early 1990s
- Genre: Fiction
- Subject: Russian village
- Notable works: Zhivoy (1966); Muzhiki i baby (1972-1980)

Boris Andreyevich Mozhayev (Russian: Борис Андреевич Можаев; June 1, 1923 – March 2, 1996) was a Soviet Russian author, dramatist, script-writer and editor, the USSR State Prize (1989) laureate, best known for his novel Zhivoy (Alive, 1966) and the two-part epic Peasant Men and Women (Muzhiki i babyi, 1972-1980). Supported by Alexander Tvardovsky and admired by Alexander Solzhenitsyn, Mozhayev experienced serious difficulties with publishing his harshly realistic, tinged with bitter humour Village prose, dealing with trials and tribulations of the Soviet peasantry in the years of collectivisation and beyond.

== Biography ==
Boris Andreyevich Mozhayev was born on June 1, 1923, in Ryazanskaya Oblast, to an Oka River steamship pilot; all of his ancestors (on mother's side too) have been one way or another connected to Oka, Volga or the Caspian Sea, where they worked as sailors, skippers, navigators, even burlaks. In 1935, during the Stalin purges, Andrey Mozhayev was arrested and deported to the Russian far East where he died. Boris was one of the six children his mother had to raise on her own. In 1940, after graduating the secondary school, Mozhayev enrolled into the shipbuilding faculty of the Gorky Institute of Navy Transport Engineers. He had to leave it due to financial difficulties and, after working as a teacher for half a year, got drafted. In 1943 he joined the Military Engineering-Technical University in Leningrad.

=== Literary career ===
In 1948, after the graduation in the rank of a lieutenant-engineer, Boris Mozhayev went to the Soviet Far East, to build fortifications in Port Arthur. It was there that he started writing poetry. His first book of verses, Dawns at the Ocean, was published in Vladivostok in 1955. The same year the book of the Uedegean folklore collected and edited by Mozhayev came out. In 1957 his debut short story "The Power of Taiga" appeared in the Oktyabr magazine. Even in his early works, according to critic Andrey Turkov, Mozhayev's approach differed from what was considered the norm: "instead of singing paeans to the 'achievements of Socialism', he was among the first to express deep concern about the consumerist attitude towards natural resources which was becoming more and more evident."

In 1961 Mozhayev's essay "The Land Awaits Its Master" caused controversy and Oktyabr magazine editor Fyodor Panfyorov had to approach one of Nikita Khrushchev's secretaries to receive the permission for the publication. In 1963 the Heaven Against Earth novel caused scandal and its publication was stopped. It came out only in 1966 under the new title Polyushko-Pole. Mikhail Kedrov's production of Mozhayev's play Having Lied Once (Yedinozhdy solgav) was banned by the Soviet Ministry of Culture. Also in 1966 one of the best known work by Mozhayev, Episodes of the Life of Fyodor Kuzkin was published by Alexander Tvardovsky's Novy Mir. The publication of a sequel was cancelled by the Minister of Culture Ekaterina Furtseva personally who (despite the Central Committee member Dmitry Polyansky's efforts to save it) declared it a parody on the Soviet way of life. Also banned was Yuri Lyubimov's production of "Fyodor Kuzkin" at Taganka Theatre; it was only in 1986 that the play could be premiered there. In 1973 Kuzkin was at last published in a small almanac called Forest Roads, under the new title Alive.

In 1980 Boris Mozhayev finished his magnum opus Peasant Men and Women a two-part epic telling the story of collectivization at Ryazanshchina, the subsequent peasant mutiny and its brutal suppression. The first part of it was published by Nash Sovremennik in 1973. The second had to wait until 1987, when it appeared in the Don magazine. Mozhayev was planning a trilogy but could manage only several chapters of the third, autobiographical part, called Izgoy (The Outcast). In 1995 he started editing the Rossiya magazine but soon was diagnosed with cancer and retired.

Boris Andreyevich Mozhayev died on March 2, 1996, in Moscow.
