= My Dagestan =

Book by Rasul Gamzatov

- Author: Rasul Gamzatov
- Original title: Дир Дагъистан
- Translators: Julius Katzer; Dorian Rottenberg (verses)
- Language: Avar
- Subject: Poetry
- Published: 1968–1970 (Avar)
- Publication place: Soviet Union

My Dagestan (Avar: Дир Дагъистан, romanized: Dir dagistan) is a book written in the Avar language by the Dagestani poet Rasul Gamzatov. The book does not belong to any specific genre but is a work of poetry, prose and criticism.

The book was translated from Avaric into Russian by Vladimir Soloukhin in 1967 and to English in 1970 by Julius Katzer and Dorian Rottenberg. The book is one of the most significant works of Dagestani literature.

== Background ==
"My Dagestan" consists of two parts. The first part was written and published as a complete book in 1967, and the second part of the book was finished in September 1970. The first part was published in Russian in the 14th issue of the Roman-Gazeta magazine in 1968, translated by Vladimir Soloukhin, and gathered a lot of interest among critics and readers. "My Dagestan" became the first prose work of Rasul Gamzatov, previously he had only published poetic works.

== Contents ==
In terms of content and format, "My Dagestan" is original and distinctive. The work is written in prose but with poetic inserts in between. Poetry is also present in the book, not only in poetic fragments, but also in prose text. Rasul Gamzatov's style is distinguished by its vivid imagery and expressiveness. In his work, the author relies on the national traditions of Dagestan literature and at the same time also draws from his experience of fiction from other languages. Rasul Gamzatov constantly makes references to folklore, proverbs, sayings, legends, and parables in the text.

The topics that the book explores are very diverse. The author discusses his reflections, monologues and memories about Dagestan and the people, about his native aul, about art and literature, about the nature of creativity and the nature of poetry.

The theme of creativity is one of the central themes in "My Dagestan", especially in the first part. The first part consists of chapters with the following titles:

- "Instead of a preface. About prefaces in general"
- "How did this book come about and where was it written?"
- "About the meaning of this book and its name"
- "About the form of this book and how to write it"
- "Language"
- "Theme"
- "Genre"
- "Style"
- "Building of this book"
- "Plot"
- "Talent"
- "Work”
- "Truth. Bravery"
- "Doubt"

The second book discusses more about the author's feelings for his homeland, the people of Dagestan, moral issues, and the history of Dagestan. The second part chapters with the following titles:

- "Father and Mother. Fire and Water"
- "Home"
- "Three Treasures of Dagestan"
- "Human"
- "People"
- "Voice"
- "Song"
- "Book”

== Narrative technique ==
A special characteristic of My Dagestan is the use of Persona poetry, specifically, through the lyrical subject. The protagonist is a mask of Rasul Gamzatov himself, possessing both the features of the author himself, but also some constructed characteristics. The reader sees everything told in the world through the subjective author's viewpoint. The author does not hide his mood from readers. The mood changes throughout the book and the reader is made aware of it. Writer and critic K. I. Abukov calls My Dagestan "a prose of changeable moods." Some fragments of My Dagestan are full of humor, satire, and irony; in other chapters there is evident sadness and bitterness; and in between, individual fragments are written with a cheerful and optimistic intonation.

== Genre ==
Researchers do not have a consensus regarding the genre affiliation of My Dagestan. It has been variously described as a lyrical story, "a prose poem", a novel-essay or a lyrical prose. The work has characteristic features of various genres in the work. Critics have pointed out that My Dagestan has features that can describe it as a creative confession, an autobiography, the history of Dagestani poetry, a folklore collection, and as a collection of the author's statements. The presence of various microgenres in the structure, such as story, short story, critical note, review, sketch-memory, fairy-tale, anecdote, parable and others have also been noted.

On his own book, Rasul Gamzatov said:

"What it will be: a story, a tale, a fairy tale, a tradition, a legend, a meditation, or just an article - I don’t know... Some editors and critics will tell me that I have not written a novel, nor a fairy tale, nor a story, nor who knows what. Other editors say this and that, and the third, and the fifth, and the tenth. I don’t mind it. You can call what comes out of the pen by any name you wish. I don't write according to the laws and conventions of books, but according to the behest of my own heart. The heart has no laws. Or rather, it has its own laws that do not apply to everybody."

== Reception ==
In total, “My Dagestan” went through 50 editions in mass circulation and was translated into 39 languages in Gamzatov's lifetime. "My Dagestan" was highly appreciated by Gamzatov's contemporaries - Soviet writers such as Chinghiz Aitmatov, Grigol Abashidze, Savva Dangulov, and Semyon Babayevsky.

Chinghiz Aitmatov wrote: “...Gamzatov's creation is unlike anything I’ve ever read. From the point of view of the genre, perhaps, it has nothing similar to itself in world literature.”

Several other literary scholars have also published analysis on the book.

== Translations ==
The book was first translated into Russian for the first time by Vladimir Soloukhin. Following the Russian translation, the book has been translated into several languages such as Bulgarian, English, French, German, Hindi, Hungarian, Italian, Korean, Persian, Polish, Punjabi, Spanish, Turkish, Vietnamese, Sinhalese and other languages. "My Dagestan" is the most famous of Gamzatov's 31 books that have been translated into foreign languages.

Some notable translations include:

- Russian translation by Vladimir Soloukhin in 1967
- English translation in 1970 by Julius Katzer and Dorian Rottenberg
- Hindi translation by Madan Lal Madhu
- Sinhala translation by Mahinda Senarath Gamage
- Pashto translation by Fazlur Rehman Zahid and Aziz Khan Malizai
- Punjabi translation by Gurbax Singh Frank
- Urdu translation by Ajmal Ajmali
- Vietnamese translation by Phan Hong Giang and Bang Viet
