= Yevgeny Nosov (writer) =

Soviet, Russian writer

- Born: Yevgeny Ivanovich Nosov; January 15, 1925; Tolmachyovo village, Kursky Uyezd, Kursk Governorate, RSFSR, Soviet Union
- Died: June 12, 2002 (aged 77); Kursk, Russia
- Occupation: Writer
- Writing career
- Period: 1957–2002
- Genres: Fiction, essays, children's literature
- Subjects: Russian village Great Patriotic War
- Notable work: The Usvyat Warriors (1980)
- Notable awards: Order of Lenin

Yevgeny Ivanovich Nosov (Russian: Евгений Иванович Носов; 15 January 1925 – 12 June 2002) was a Soviet and Russian writer, part of the Village Prose movement, who since 1958 (when he debuted with On the Fisherman's Trail, a collection of stories and short novels) contributed regularly to Nash Sovremennik and Novy Mir magazines. Nosov, who fought in World War II and was severely injured in February 1945, received two Orders of Lenin (1984, 1990) and the Hero of Socialist Labour (1990) title. In 2001 he was awarded the Solzhenitsyn Prize for having created works that "...highlighted the tragedy of the War and the immense consequences it had for the Russian village, revealed to the full extent the belated bitterness of forgotten and neglected war veterans."
