= Kilmezsky District =

Kilmezsky District Кильмезский район (Russian)
- District
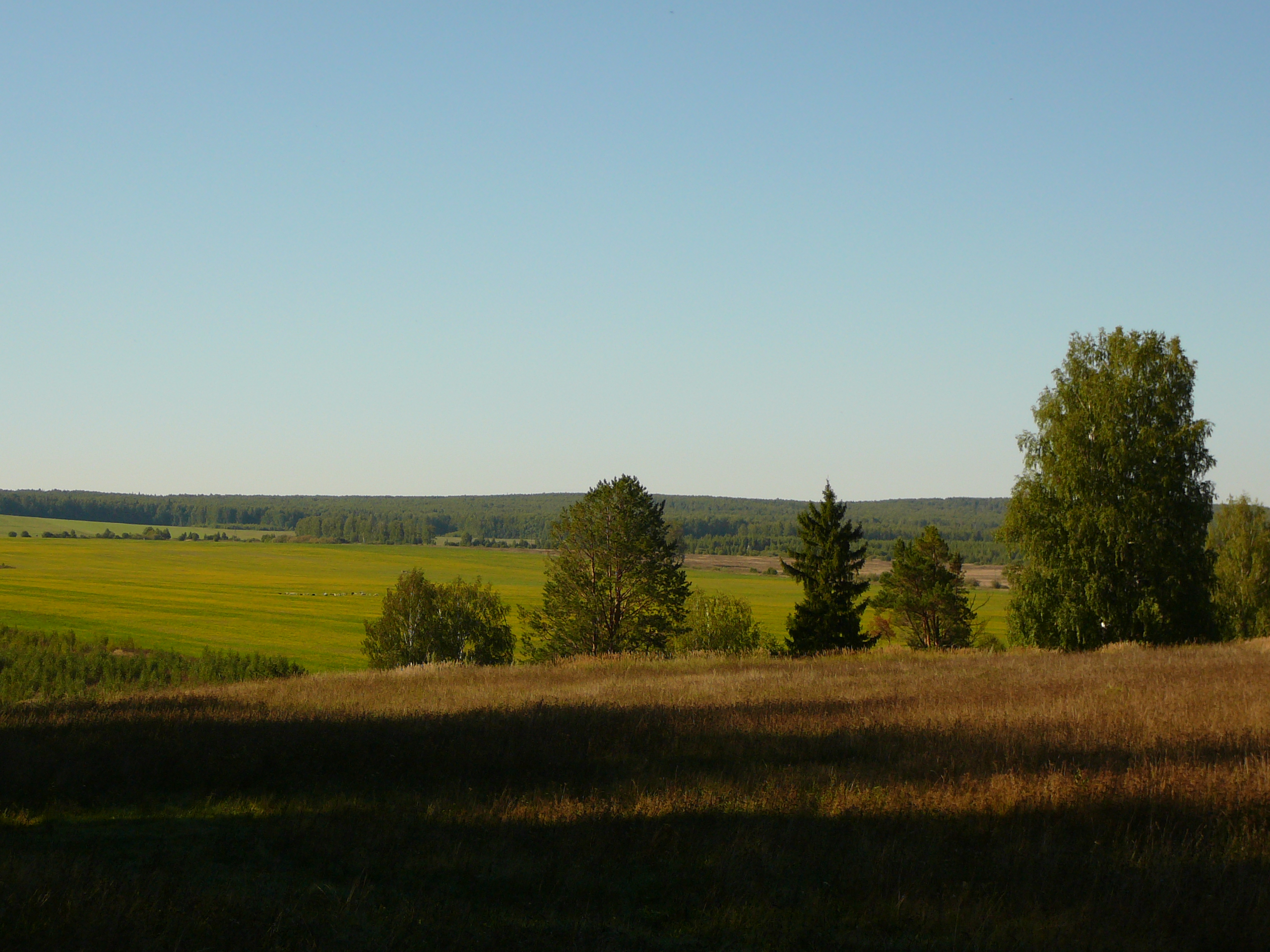
- Landscape in Kilmezsky District

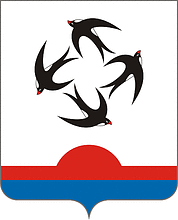
- Flag Coat of arms
- Location of Kilmezsky District in Kirov Oblast
- Coordinates: 56°56′30″N 51°04′00″E
- Country: Russia
- Federal subject: Kirov Oblast
- Established: 1929
- Administrative center: Kilmez

Area
  - Total: 3,106.4 km^{2} (1,199.4 sq mi)

Population (2010 Census)
  - Total: 13,086
  - Density: 4.2126/km^{2} (10.911/sq mi)
  - Urban: 45.5%
  - Rural: 54.5%

Administrative structure
  - Administrative divisions: 1 Urban-type settlements, 11 Rural okrugs
  - Inhabited localities: 1 urban-type settlements, 71 rural localities

Municipal structure
  - Municipally incorporated as: Kilmezsky Municipal District
  - Municipal divisions: 1 urban settlements, 11 rural settlements
- Time zone: UTC+3 (MSK)
- OKTMO ID: 33617000
- Website: http://kilmezadm.ru/

Kilmezsky District (Russian: Кильме́зский райо́н) is an administrative and municipal district (raion), one of the thirty-nine in Kirov Oblast, Russia. It is located in the southeast of the oblast. The area of the district is 3,106.4 square kilometers (1,199.4 sq mi). Its administrative center is the urban locality (an urban-type settlement) of Kilmez. Population: 13,086 (2010 census); 16,132 (2002 Census); 18,370 (1989 Soviet census). The population of Kilmez accounts for 45.5% of the district's total population.
