= Gurbax Singh Frank =

Punjabi scholar and translator (1935–2022)

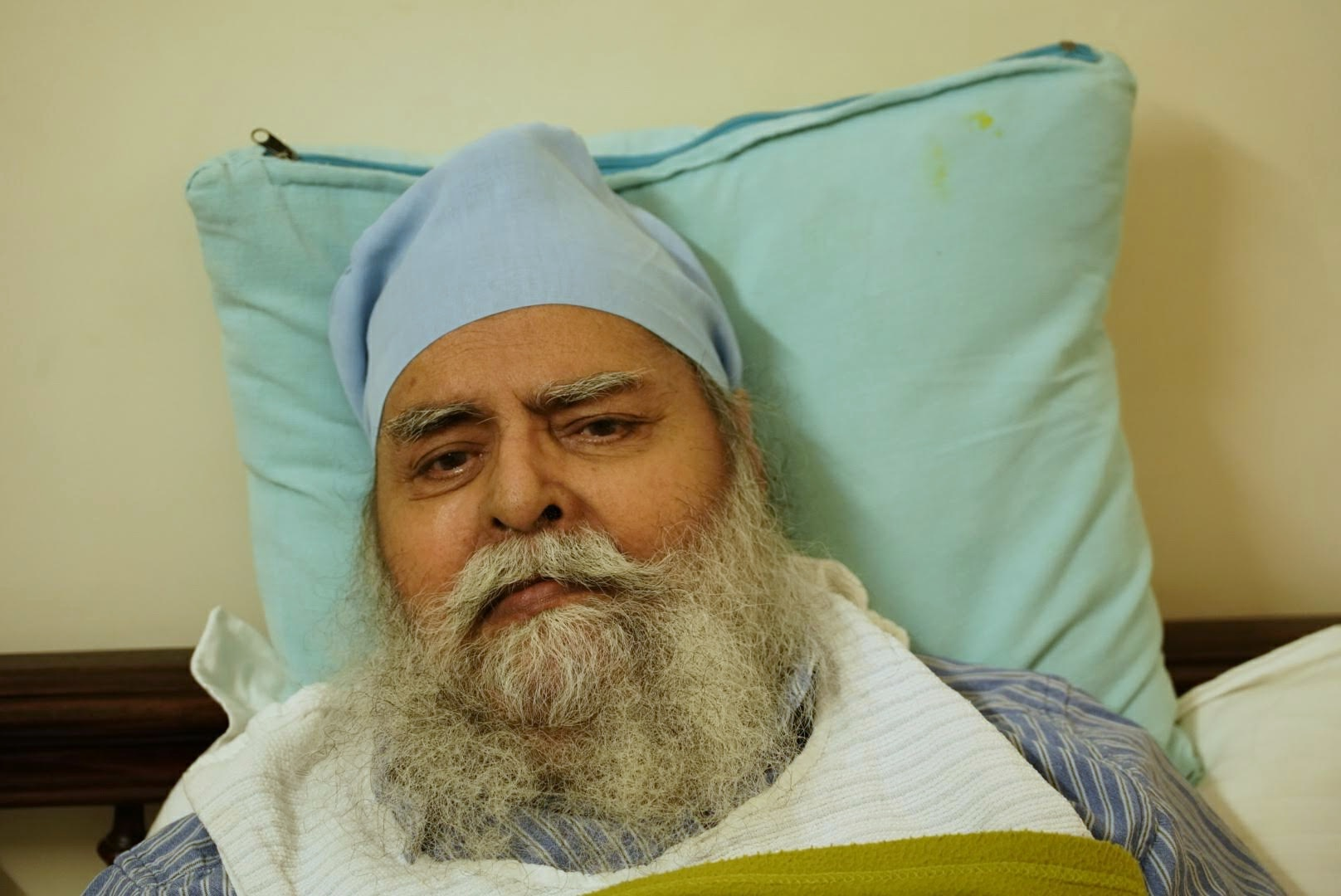
- Singh Frank in 2018
- Born: 1 September 1935
- Died: 14 April 2022 (aged 86); Amritsar, Punjab, India
- Citizenship: India
- Writing career
- Language: Punjabi

Gurbax Singh Frank (1 September 1935 – 14 April 2022) was a Punjabi scholar and translator. In 2011, he was awarded the Sahitya Akademi Translation Prize for his book, 'Bharat Nikki Kahani', an anthology of short stories of various Indian languages.

== Biography ==
Frank completed his PhD on the short stories of Kartar Singh Duggal from Institute of Oriental Studies, Moscow, in 1975. He spent a total of 10 years in Soviet Union (1969–1976 and 1988–1991) and translated literary works of Russian authors like Rasul Gamzatov, Boris Polevoy, Chinghiz Aitmatov, Leo Tolstoy, Maxim Gorky, V Pannova, and Mikhail Lermontov into Punjabi.

He became a professor at the Guru Nanak Dev University in 1979 and retired as head of the department in 1995.

He died on 14 April 2022 in Amritsar.

== Works ==
=== Books ===
- Sahit sambad [Literature] (in Punjabi). Panjabi Writers' Co-operative Society. 1987.
- Sabhiachar ate Panjabi sabhiachar [Culture and Punjabi Culture] (in Punjabi). Panjabi Writers' Co-operative Society. 1987.

=== Criticism ===
- 1984

=== Translations ===
- Gamzatov, Rasul (1967). Mera Dagistan [My Dagistan] (in Punjabi). Gracious Books (published 1971). ISBN 9789380906409.
- Sarkadi, Imre (1961). Buzdil [Coward] (in Punjabi). National Book Shop (published 1997). ISBN 978-81-7116-203-1.
