= 3409 Abramov =

Stony asteroid

Discovery
- Discovered by: N. Chernykh
- Discovery site: Crimean Astrophysical Obs.
- Discovery date: 9 September 1977

Designations
- Named after: Fyodor Abramov (Russian writer)
- Alternative designations: 1977 RE_{6} · 1929 UP; 1929 VD · 1948 TW_{1} 1958 VU · 1972 TF_{5} 1979 BS_{1} · 1980 GF_{1} 1982 VY_{5} · 1985 GD_{1}
- Minor planet category: main-belt · Koronis

Orbital characteristics
- Epoch 4 September 2017 (JD 2458000.5)
- Uncertainty parameter 0
- Observation arc: 87.42 yr (31,930 days)
- Aphelion: 3.0914 AU
- Perihelion: 2.6174 AU
- Semi-major axis: 2.8544 AU
- Eccentricity: 0.0830
- Orbital period (sidereal): 4.82 yr (1,761 days)
- Mean anomaly: 92.335°
- Mean motion: 0° 12^{m} 15.84^{s} / day
- Inclination: 1.4019°
- Longitude of ascending node: 211.41°
- Argument of perihelion: 168.58°

Physical characteristics
- Dimensions: 10.765±0.168 km 10.80 km (calculated); 11.402±1.938 (Note: Ryan (2015): mean diameter of 11.402±1.938 and an albedo of 0.236±0.044. Summary figures for (3409) Abramov at Collaborative Asteroid Lightcurve Link (CALL))
- Synodic rotation period: 7.791±0.002 h 9.0±0.4 h
- Geometric albedo: 0.236±0.044; 0.24 (assumed); 0.242±0.060
- Spectral type: S
- Absolute magnitude (H): 12.0

3409 Abramov, provisional designation 1977 RE_{6}, is a stony Koronian asteroid from the outer region of the asteroid belt, approximately 11 kilometers in diameter. It was discovered on 9 September 1977, by Soviet–Russian astronomer Nikolai Chernykh at Crimean Astrophysical Observatory in Nauchnyj on the Crimean peninsula. The asteroid was named after Russian writer Fyodor Abramov.

== Orbit and classification ==
The S-type asteroid is a member of the Koronis family, a group consisting of about 200 known stony bodies with nearly ecliptical orbits. It orbits the Sun in the outer main-belt at a distance of 2.6–3.1 AU once every 4 years and 10 months (1,761 days). Its orbit has an eccentricity of 0.08 and an inclination of 1° with respect to the ecliptic. The first precovery was obtained at Lowell Observatory in 1929, extending the asteroid's observation arc by 48 years prior to its discovery.

== Physical characteristics ==
=== Lightcurves ===
In 2008, a photometric lightcurve analysis at the Universidad de Monterry Observatory, Mexico, gave a well-defined rotation period of 7.791±0.002 hours with a brightness amplitude of 0.50 in magnitude (U=3), while an observation by astronomer René Roy rendered a tentative period of 9.0±0.4 hours (U=2).

=== Diameter and albedo ===
According to the survey carried out by the NEOWISE mission of the NASA's space-based Wide-field Infrared Survey Explorer, the asteroid has an albedo of 0.24 with a corresponding diameter of 10.8 kilometers. The Collaborative Asteroid Lightcurve Link and others closely agree with these findings.

== Naming ==
This minor planet was named in memory of Russian novelist and literary critic Fyodor Abramov (1920–1983), whose work focused on the difficult lives of the Russian peasant class. The official naming citation was published by the Minor Planet Center on 1 September 1993 (M.P.C. 22498).
