= Vladimir Lichutin =

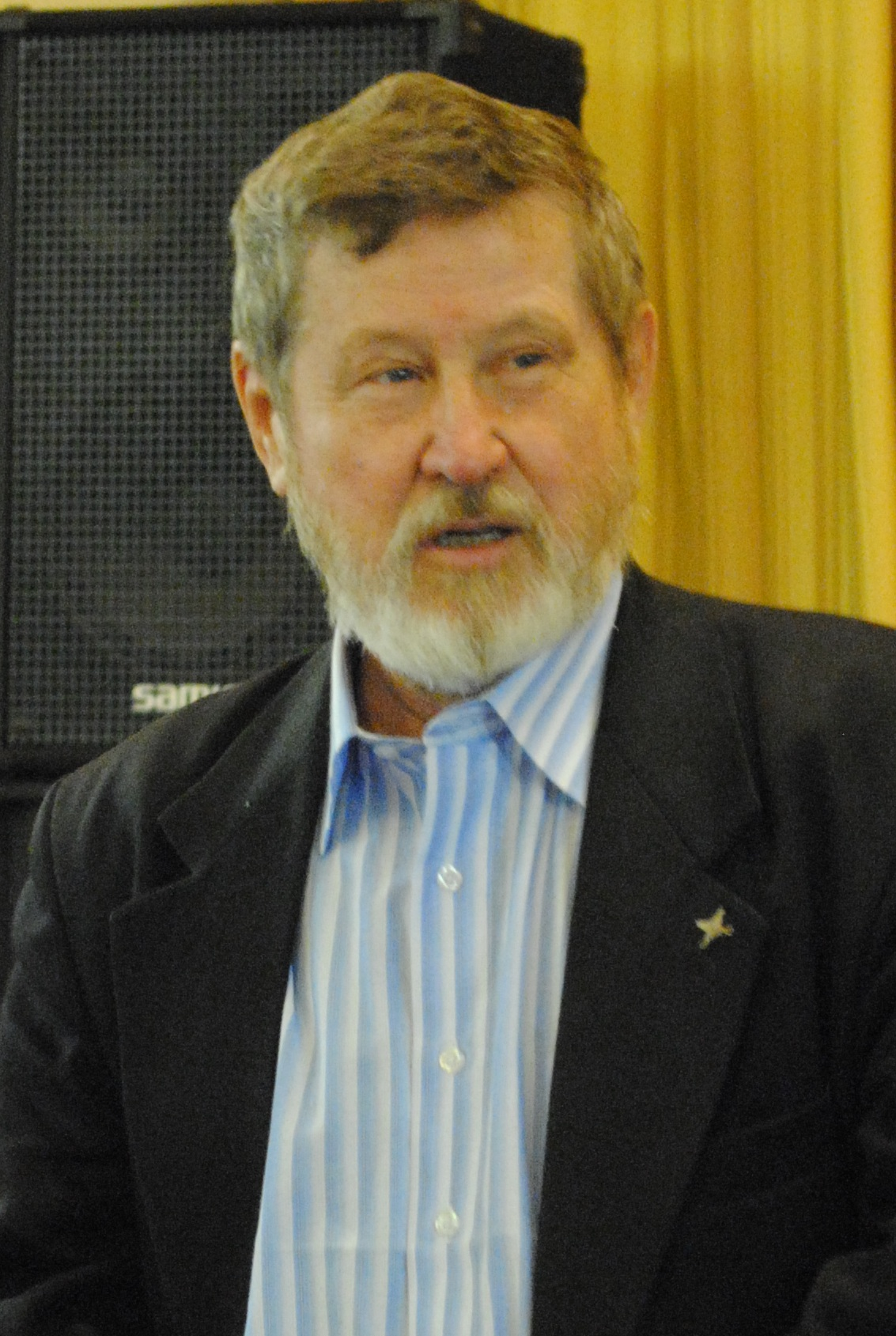
- Born: March 13, 1940; Mezen, Mezensky District, Arkhangelsk Oblast
- Citizenship: Russian Federation
- Occupation: Novelist • essayist
- Writing career
- Notable work: Raskol (1990-1996)
- Notable awards: Yasnaya Polyana Award (2009); The Bunin’s Award (2011)
- Literary movement: Village Prose

Vladimir Vladimirovich Lichutin (Russian: Влади́мир Влади́мирович Личу́тин; born March 13, 1940, in Mezen, Mezensky District, Arkhangelsk Oblast, USSR) is a Soviet Russian writer, a major proponent of the derevenschiki movement of the late 20th century literature, best known for his Raskol (1990-1996) epic. Most of Lichutin's novels and novelets are based on the life of real people of the coastal White Sea areas of his native Pomorje region.

== Biography ==
Vladimir Lichutin was born in the town of Mezen, Arkhangelsk Oblast, into the family of a teacher. His father was killed in the Great Patriotic War and mother alone had to raise four children. In 1960 Lichutin graduated from the local timber-processing industrial school and enrolled into the Leningrad University's faculty of journalism. After the graduation in 1962 he returned to Arkhangelsk to work as a journalist for the local newspaper Pravda Severa.

Litchutin debuted with The White Room novelet, published in the No. 8, 1972, issue of Sever magazine. It was followed by Iona and Alexandra (1973), Long Rest (1974) and The Marriages' Time (1975). Among Vladimir Lichutin's best known 1970s works were Soul's Burning (1976) and Winged Seraphima (1978), both praising native Pomors ' traditional values, their ascetic way of life and high moral standards. Lichutin took part in several folklorist expeditions which provided him with rich linguistic material he has since then incorporated into his prose. In 1975, after graduating the Higher literary Courses at the Soviet Union of Writers he settled in Moscow, but continued to visit his native region regularly.

His 1985 novel Wanderers (sequel to Long Rest) told the story of a group of young members of the Old Believers' sect of the early 19th century. His next one, Lyubostai (1987), criticized what he saw as contemporary Soviet intelligentsia's lack of 'moral firmness' and examined the spiritual crisis of the Russian people of the second half of the 20th century.

Vladimir Lichutin's epic Raskol (1990-1996) is rated as his outstanding novel. Years later it brought him first the prestigious Yasnaya Polyana Award (2009), then The Russian Government's State Prize (2011). The 2000 book of essays called Soul Inexplicable (subtitled: "Thinking of Russian People") was praised for its colourful, highly stylized 'skaz' type of language. Two of Litchutin's later novels, The Paradise Fugitives (2005) and The River of Love (2010) brought him The Major Russian Literary Prize of the Writers' Union (2006) and the Bunin's Prize (2011), respectively.

== Selected bibliography ==
- White Room (Belaya gornitsa, 1972, novelet)
- Iona and Alexandra (1973, novelet)
- The Long Rest (Dolgy Otdykh, 1974, novel)
- Nyura the Widow (Vdova Nyura, 1974, novelet)
- The Marriages' Time (Vremya svadeb, 1975, novelet)
- The Golden Bottom (Zolotoye dno, 1976, novelet)
- Grandmas and Unkles (Babushki y dyadyushki, 1976, novelet)
- Soul is Burning (Dusha gorit, 1976, novelet)
- Winged Seraphima (Krylataya Seragfima, 1978, novelet)
- The Last Witch (Posledny koldun, 1980, novelet)
- The Home-made Philosopher (Domasnhy filosof, 1983)
- Love Stories (Povesti o lyubvi, 1985, collection)
- Wanderers (Skitaltsy, 1985, novel)
- The Wonder Mountain (Divis-gora, 1986, essays collection)
- Lyubostai (1987, novel)
- Farmazon (1988, novelet)
- Soul Inexplicable (Dusha neizjyasnimaya, 2000, book of essays)
- Miledy Rotman (2001, novel)
- The Heavenly Fugitive (Beglets iz Raya, 2005, novel)
- River of Love (Reka Lyubvi, 2010, novel)
