= Vasily Popov (poet) =

21st-century Russian poet and painter

- Василий Попов
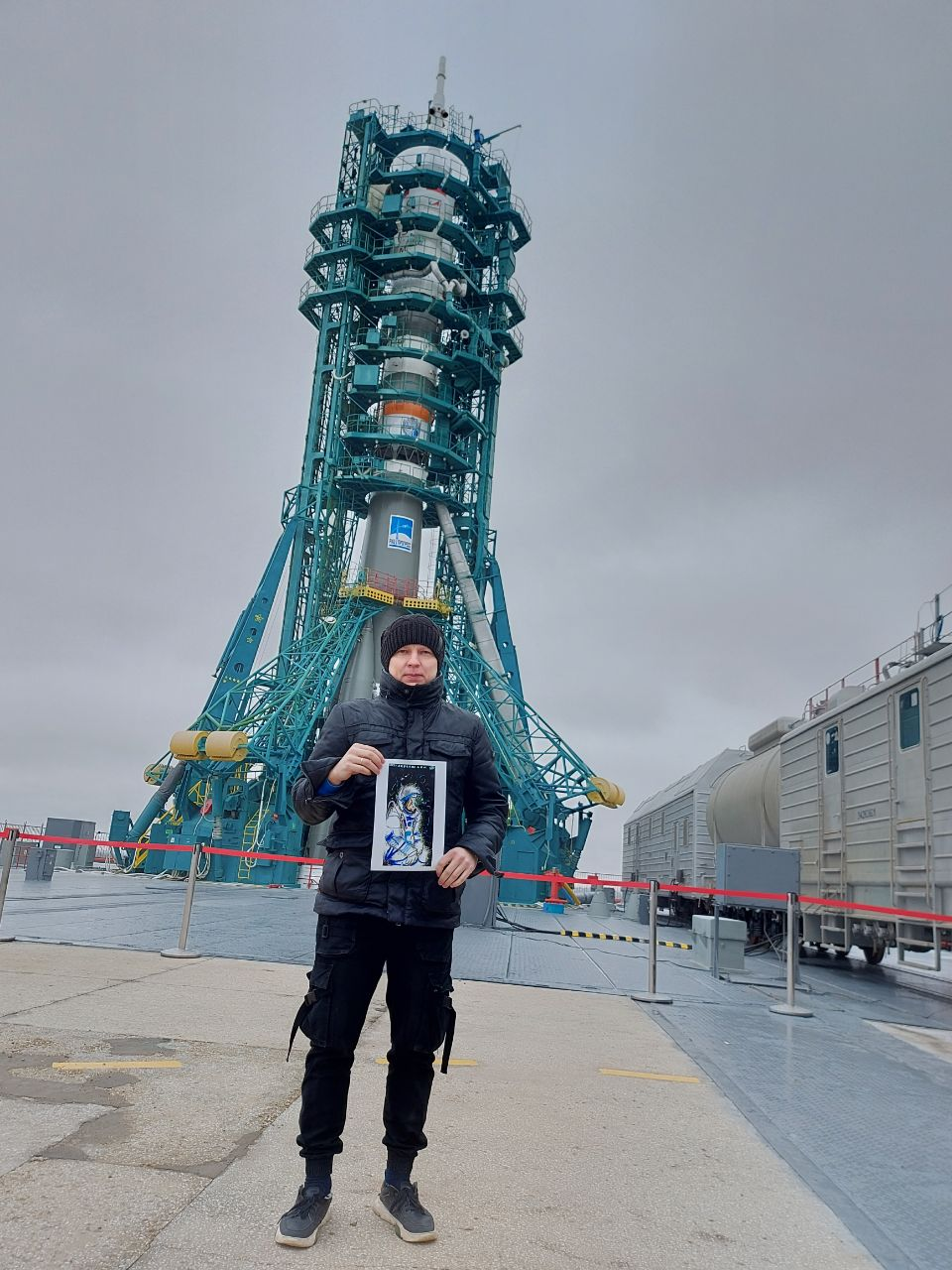
- Vasily Popov prepares to launch his NFT-published painting in space from Baikonur cosmodrome
- Born: 3 April 1983 (age 43); Angarsk, Russian SSR, USSR
- Occupations: poet, painter
- Writing career
- Language: Russian
- Website: entities.ru

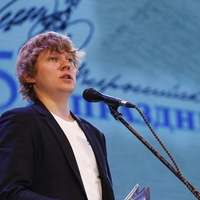
On stage as poet

Vasily Nikolaevich Popov (born 3 April 1983) is a Russian painter, poet, and interpreter. He is a member of the Union of Writers of Russia, where he serves as Secretary of the board of directors. He is a recipient of the Bunin Award, the Lermontov Award, and the Grand Prix of the Golden Knight Literary Forum. As a painter, he is believed to be the first painter to have one of his works launched into space; the painting was simultaneously published on the Internet as an NFT.

== Biography and artworks ==
Popov was born on 3 April, 1983, in Angarsk. After finishing high school, he enrolled at Siberian Institute of Management in Novosibirsk, graduating with a diploma in 2005. Later, in 2010, he also graduated from Maxim Gorky Literature Institute in Moscow, where he currently resides.

=== Painter ===
"Space" (from "Entities")
- NFT image launched into space

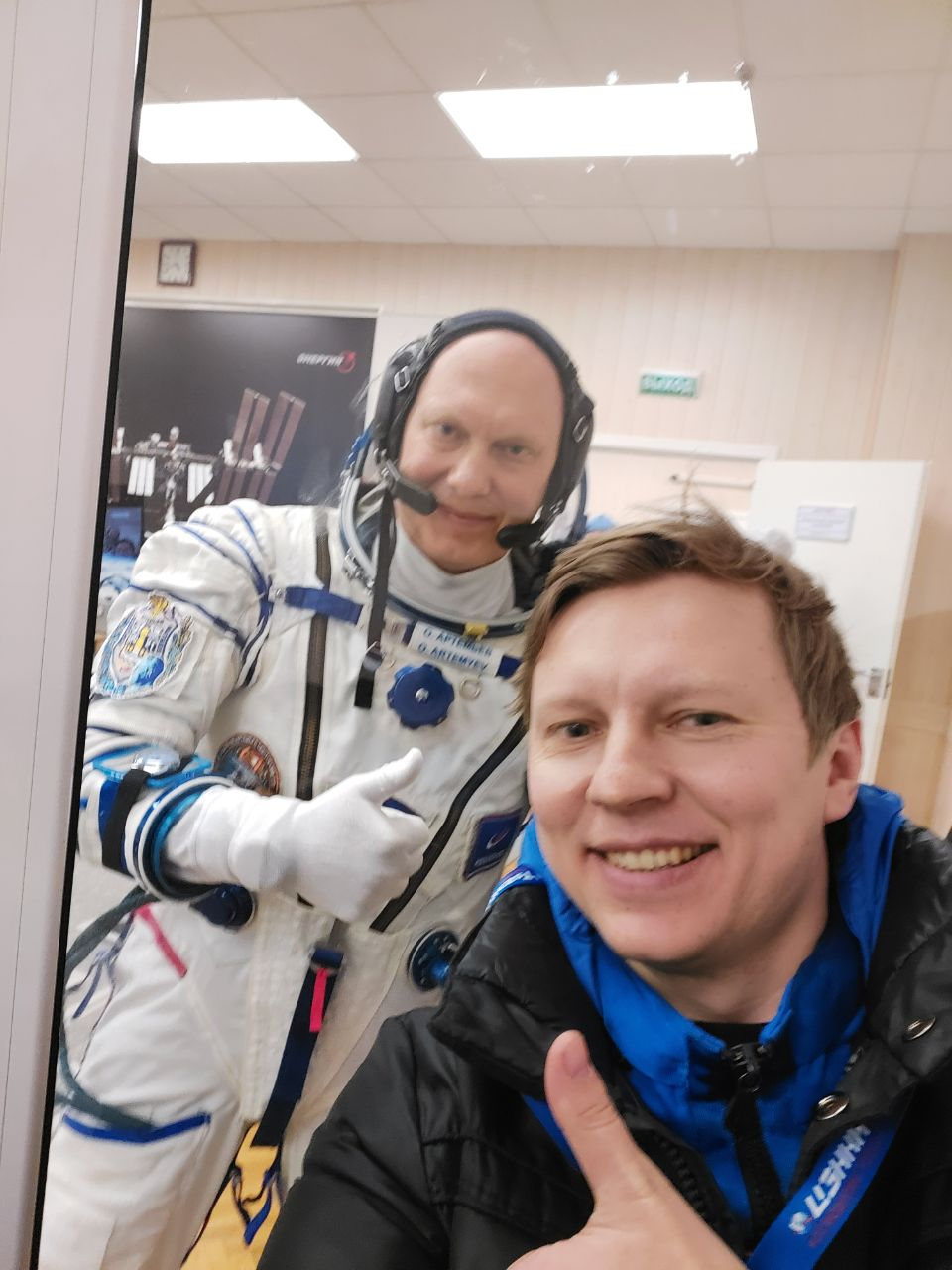
Vasily Popov and Oleg Artemyev

In 2020s he began to paint pictures, aside from his regular work as a poet. He created a series of artworks called Entities. He publishes and distributes his artwork from this series digitally as NFT entries, secured by blockchain technology. One of these "Entities" is a portrait of a cosmonaut. Vasily Popov managed to launch this painting in space in an attempt to become the first painter to launch an NFT-published painting into Earth orbit.

Russian cosmonaut Oleg Artemyev agreed to take his painting with him on his regular ride to the International Space Station. He started off with it from Baikonur cosmodrome on March 18, 2022. According to Popov, "the painting will later become a stellar book, where will be placed creative visions of space topic the thoughts of modern writers". The book is expected to be illustrated with photographs from space made by Oleg Artemyev while in spaceflight.

=== Poet ===
He has published five poetry anthologies. Some of the poems were translated into Bulgarian, Chinese, Vietnamese and English. As an interpreter, Popov was the first to translate into Russian the Vietnamese poem "Lamentations of tormented soul" by poet Nguyễn Du.

His poetry was published in several literary magazines. Among them: "Our Contemporary" (Moscow), "Five Times five" (Moscow), "Novel-magazine XXI century" (Moscow), "Bratina" (Moscow), "Native Ladoga" (St. Petersburg), "Space" (Alma-Ata), "Priokskie Dawns" (Tula), "Russian Echo" (Samara), "Nevsky Almanac" (Rostov-on-Don), "New Yenisei Writer" (Krasnoyarsk), "Argamak" (Naberezhnye Chelny), "Trajectory of Creativity" (Kaluga), "Don" (Rostov-on-Don) and others.

Popov has received several literary awards, including the Bunin Award in 2012, the Lermontov Award in 2014, and a Grand Prix of the Golden Knight Literary Forum for the book Roads of Skies and Lands.

Maria Avvakumova, a Russian poet, characterized Popov's artwork:

The delightful youthful lightness of Vasily Popov's poetry moves into our souls with light, more than once forcing us to exclaim and jump with pleasure. Such are these verses. They, like snowdrops, broke through after the heavy, dark poetic winter of Russia. God willing, it will be more fun for us.

Poet Nikolai Zinoviev evaluated the artwork of Popov positively:

I forgot that words themselves can conclude and mean something besides the trinkets with which they were hung. Vasily Popov does not forget this. It is this "feeling of the primordial nature of the word" together with a clear and pure look that gives birth to such poems. Thank you Vasily, for a breath of pure air of real Poetry.

== Books ==
- 2008 — "The Voice of Silence"
- 2010 — "Berserk"
- 2013 — "Roads of Skies and Lands"
- 2015 — "This is my house"

== Awards ==
- 2009 — Laureate of the All-Russian Poetry Prize "Falcons of the Russian Land"
- 2011 — Winner of the first degree of the International Poetry Competition "Cranes over Russia"
- 2012 — Grand Prix of the Golden Knight Literary Forum
- 2012 — Winner of the I. Bunin Prize
- 2014 — Winner of the M. Y. Lermontov Prize
