= Lev Knyazev =

Russian writer

- Лев Князев
- Born: 12 April 1926; Vyatka, RSFSR
- Died: 27 January 2012 (aged 85); Vladivostok, Russia
- Education: Maritime State University
- Occupation: poet
- Writing career
- Period: 1956-1999
- Genres: Novel, Novella

Lev Knyazev (Russian: Лев Николаевич Князев; 12 April 1926 - 27 January 2012) was a Russian writer best known for his novels describing lives of seamen of Vladivostok, the biggest Russian seaport on the Pacific coast. His most famous novel "Morskoi Protest’ (Sea Protest) was sold 2 million copies in just one year. Though his creative heritage is primarily in prose, he is considered one of the brightest artists of the Perestroika times, the signer of beautiful people who kept their souls pure in the most challenging times.

Lev (in Russian it also means a "lion") was born in the family of two teachers from central Russia, one of five children (he had three brothers and a sister). His family had to move around a lot in search of new jobs – those were the hard times of the rulings of Stalin and later Khrushchev. When he was 16 he finished school with honors – early – and wanted to help his family, and so he came to work to a ship that delivered cargo to and from America during World War II and worked there for a year. At 17 he was accepted to the university and got a Degree in engineering in less than 4 years. He married young, at 24, to love of his life – Nadezhda, a pretty girl from a poor family who at 18 was working and supporting her ailing mother and younger brother. The two were together for almost 64 years until his death in 2012. The couple had three children.

Throughout the famished and poor existence right after World War II and hardships of Communist regime, he kept his spirit high and never lost hope and trust in the people of his home country. His political views developed over time – raised in the family of members of the party, he first trusted the regime, but later realized that he – as millions of his fellow countrymen – was deceived by the propaganda. Throughout the years Lev Knyazev developed friendship with dozens of people – and not only in Russia. He became close friends with American author, historian and activist Jay Higginbotham, who politically advocated a doctrine of American reconciliation between countries such as the USSR and Cuba. In 1986, Knyazev and Higginbotham took a trip through Russia and helped create sister-city relationship between Mobile and the Russian city of Rostov. In 1989 Lev Knyazev visited the Southern states making speeches and talking about friendship of two countries and the role of literature and art. He was recognized as an Honorary Citizen of the City of Natchitoches by the mayor in acknowledgement of the effect his visit had on the city life.

In 1990s Russia was going through the collapse of the communist ruling and the whole state of life everybody was used to. Already in his 70s, Lev Knyazev was still working, started writing lyrics and poetry, and hosted clubs for young aspiring poets and writers. He was very popular in his home city of Vladivostok, was a long-time Chairman of the Literary Union of Primorye, and was awarded the title of Honorary Citizen of the City of Vladivostok.

He is one of the signatories of the Letter of the Seventy-Four.

== Awards ==
- Order of the Patriotic War
- Order of the Badge of Honour
- Medal of Ushakov
- Medal of Zhukov
- Jubilee Medal "In Commemoration of the 100th Anniversary of the Birth of Vladimir Ilyich Lenin"
- Medal "For the Victory over Japan"
- Medal "For Valiant Labour in the Great Patriotic War 1941–1945"
- Honoured Cultural Worker of the RSFSR
- Honorary Citizen of Vladivostok
