= Viktor Likhonosov =

Russian writer (1936–2021)

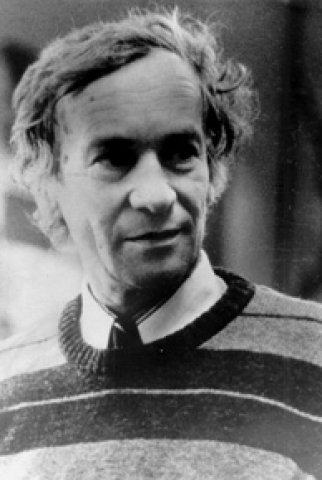
- Born: 30 April 1936; Kemerovo, Russian SFSR, Soviet Union
- Died: 9 August 2021 (aged 85); Krasnodar, Russia
- Education: Kuban State University
- Writing career
- Genres: Fiction, memoirs, essays
- Notable work: Unwritten Memoirs: Our Little Paris (1986)
- Notable awards: RSFSR State Prize (1988); Order of Friendship; Order of the Badge of Honour; Hero of the Labour of Krasnodar Krai; Presidential Letter of Gratitude

Viktor Ivanovich Likhonosov (Russian: Ви́ктор Ива́нович Лихоно́сов, 30 April 1936 – 9 August 2021) was a Russian writer, laureate of the Russian State Prize (1988), the International Mikhail Sholokhov prize and the first Yasnaya Polyana award (2003).

== Biography ==
Likhonosov was born in Topki, Kemerovo Oblast, Soviet Union. In the 1960s, he was part of the Village Prose movement, and was supported by Alexander Tvardovsky who published his debut stories in Novy mir, claiming their author to be 'a Soviet heir to Ivan Bunin'. In the mid-1970s, through Yuri Kazakov, Likhonosov met Boris Zaitsev and Georgy Adamovich and became deeply involved in researching the history of Russian emigration. Unwritten Memoirs: Our Little Paris, a 1986 novel dealing with the modern history of Russian Cossacks abroad, is seen as his major work. Likhonosov lived in Krasnodar where he edited the literary magazine Rodnaya Kubanh.

He died from COVID-19 in Krasnodar on 9 August 2021, at the age of 85, during the COVID-19 pandemic in Russia. His wife had died 10 days prior.
