= Vladimir Bushin =

Soviet writer

- Владимир Бушин
- Born: 24 January 1924; Glukhovo, Bogorodsky Uyezd, Soviet Union
- Died: 25 December 2019 (aged 95)
- Resting place: Vagankovo Cemetery
- Education: Gorky Literature Institute
- Occupations: Writer, publicist, journalist
- Writing career
- Genres: Prose, Poetry, Feuilleton, Publicistics
- Notable awards: Sholokhov International Prize

Vladimir Sergeyevich Bushin (Russian: Влади́мир Серге́евич Бу́шин; 24 January 1924) was a Russian writer, essayist, literary critic, columnist and social activist. Bushin was born in Glukhovo, Bogorodsky Uyezd, Moscow Governorate, RSFSR, USSR, and was a member of the Union of Soviet Writers and Communist. He was one of the signers of the Russian nationalist pamphlet called Letter of the Seventy-Four.

== Biography ==
He was born to a former officer in the Imperial Russian Army and a nurse. His mother worked in Arseny Morozov's textile factory in her youth. After graduating from a real school, his father entered the Alekseyevskoye Officers' School and graduated in 1916.

Vladimir Bushin spent his early childhood in the home of his grandfather, a veteran of the Russo-Japanese War and chairman of the Marat collective farm in the village of Rylskoye in the Tula region on Nepryadva, not far from Kulikovo Field.

Vladimir Bushin completed school in Moscow in 1941, a few days before the start of the Great Patriotic War.

In the fall of 1942, he went to the front. As part of the 103rd separate army company of the VNOS of the 50th Army, he marched from Kaluga to Königsberg. At the front, celebrating his 20th birthday in 1944, he began keeping a diary, noting: "When Julius Caesar was two years older than I am now, he recalled Alexander the Great, a young and precocious man, and exclaimed: 'Twenty-two! And nothing has yet been done for immortality!'... They say diaries are usually lied to. Of course, lying to yourself is sometimes much more necessary than lying to others. And sometimes it's comforting, even gratifying. But I'll try not to lie". At the front, Bushin joined the Communist Party.

In Manchuria, in the same company, as part of the 2nd Army of the 2nd Far Eastern Front, he fought in the war against the Japanese. He was demobilized in 1946.

In 1951, he graduated from the Gorky Literary Institute, where he entered as a poet. During his studies, he served as secretary of the Komsomol committee of the institute. He then graduated from the Moscow Law Institute as an external student.

On January 4, 1966, Bushin, while appearing live on the television program "Literary Tuesday" (Leningrad Television Studio), spoke out against the renaming of pre-revolutionary street and city names. He also quoted excerpts from letters from his readers, who suggested that the cities of Kuibyshev, Gorky, Kalinin, and Kirov return to their original names.

In 1979, he harshly criticized the State Publishing House of Fiction for the poor quality of the preparation of the anniversary edition of the Complete Works of Alexander Pushkin. His feuilleton "Fakhchisarai Bontan" was published on September 24, 1976, only by Moskovskij Komsomolets; major journals refused to publish it, fearing to criticize the country's main publishing house. "But even then, I found a journal that published the article—the Rostov-based Don (No. 1, 1977). True, the article was shortened, given the toothless title "Unfortunate Oversights of a Serious Publication" and relegated to the almost entertaining genre of "Notes in the Margins"... Well, thanks for that in the world of cowards and overcautious writers. And Goslit didn't even bat an eye at either the feuilleton or the article," Bushin noted.

A communist since wartime, Bushin was highly critical of both the party bureaucracy and the party officials. May 7, 1979, coincided with the funeral of critic Dmitry Starikov and a party meeting of writers, at which the First Secretary of the Moscow City Party Committee, Viktor Grishin, spoke. "There was more life in the funeral than in his speech" Vladimir Sergeyevich wrote sarcastically in his diary. That same May 1979, he sent a letter to the CPSU Central Committee regarding its resolution "On Further Improvement of Ideological Work": "I affirm that there has been no improvement. Just chatter, dull, general phrases, sycophancy! Take Narovchatov's article on awarding five-time Hero of the Soviet Union Brezhnev the Lenin Prize for Literature for Malaya Zemlya ('Small Land') for example. He writes, for example: 'For a true leader, there are no small matters. All of them, when he pays attention to them, become big.' Just like that! He glanced at a kopeck, and it became a chervonets. The magical gaze of a true leader. I conclude with this: 'The resolution should have spoken not of "further improvement," but of a fundamental restructuring of ideological work. Of course, I don't expect any response, just as I did to the letter about 'Malaya Zemlya' ('Small Land')."

Regarding his attitude toward religion, Bushin stated: "I myself am a man I was baptized, but religious feelings did not visit me".

== Awards ==
- Order of the Patriotic War
- Medal "For Courage"
- Medal "For Battle Merit"
- Jubilee Medal "In Commemoration of the 100th Anniversary of the Birth of Vladimir Ilyich Lenin"
- Medal "For the Victory over Germany in the Great Patriotic War 1941–1945"
- Jubilee Medal "Twenty Years of Victory in the Great Patriotic War 1941–1945"
- Jubilee Medal "Thirty Years of Victory in the Great Patriotic War 1941–1945"
- Jubilee Medal "Forty Years of Victory in the Great Patriotic War 1941–1945"
- Jubilee Medal "50 Years of Victory in the Great Patriotic War 1941–1945"
- Medal of Zhukov
- Jubilee Medal "60 Years of Victory in the Great Patriotic War 1941–1945"
- Jubilee Medal "65 Years of Victory in the Great Patriotic War 1941–1945"
- Jubilee Medal "70 Years of Victory in the Great Patriotic War 1941–1945"
- Medal "In Commemoration of the 850th Anniversary of Moscow"
- Medal "For the Victory over Japan"
- Medal "For the Capture of Königsberg"
- Medal "Veteran of Labour"
- Jubilee Medal "50 Years of the Armed Forces of the USSR"
- Jubilee Medal "60 Years of the Armed Forces of the USSR"
- Jubilee Medal "70 Years of the Armed Forces of the USSR"
- Medal "In Commemoration of the 800th Anniversary of Moscow"
