= Kilmez, Kirov Oblast =

Kilmez Кильмезь
- Urban-type settlement
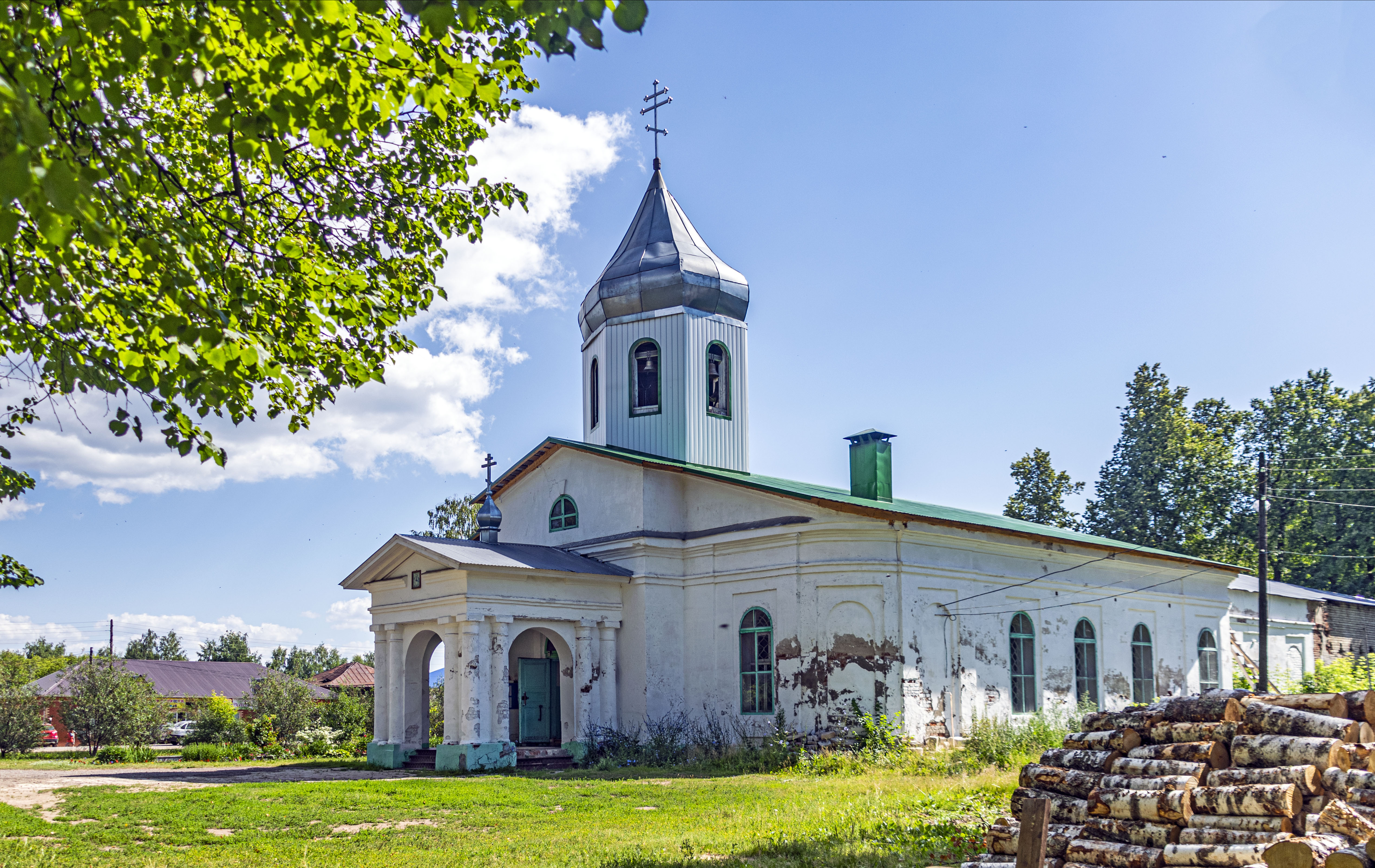
- Trinty Church in Kilmez
- Interactive map of Kilmez
- Location of Kilmez Kilmez (Kirov Oblast)
- Coordinates: 56.9449°N 51.0678°E
- Country: Russia
- Federal subject: Kirov Oblast
- Administrative district: Kilmezsky District

Population (2010 Census)
  - Total: 5,956
  - Estimate (2025): 5,240 (−12%)
- Time zone: UTC+3 (MSK)
- Postal code: 613570
- OKTMO ID: 33617151051

Kilmez (Russian: Кильмезь) is an urban locality (an urban-type settlement) in Kilmezsky District of Kirov Oblast, Russia. Population: 5,956 (2010 census); 6,064 (2002 census); 6,151 (1989 Soviet census). The writer Vladimir Krupin was born in the settlement.
