= Mikhail Alekseyev (writer) =

Writer

- Born: 6 May 1918; Saratov Governorate, RSFSR
- Died: 21 May 2007 (aged 89); Moscow, Russian Federation
- Resting place: Peredelkino Cemetery
- Education: Maxim Gorky Literature Institute
- Writing career
- Genres: fiction, memoirs
- Subjects: War, Soviet village

Mikhail Nikolayevich Alekseyev (Russian: Михаи́л Никола́евич Алексе́ев; 6 May 1918 – 21 May 2007) was a Russian Soviet writer and editor, writing mostly about the Great Patriotic War (Soldiers, 1951, 1959; My Stalingrad, 1993-1998, the Fatherland and Mikhail Sholokhov Prizes, respectively) and the life of Soviet peasantry (Unweeping Willow, 1970-1974, the USSR State Prize in 1976). His controversial Fighters (1981) novel was one of the few non-dissident works of the time to bring about the issue of the 1933 Soviet famine. In 1969-1990 Alekseyev edited Moskva magazine.

== Biography ==
Mikhail Alekseyev was born in Monastyrskoye village of the Saratov Governorate, into a peasant family. In 1933 his mother died of famine, a year later his father, a victim of political repressions, died in GULAG. In 1936 he enrolled in the training college, then got mobilized into the Red Army and was sent to Irkutsk. In 1940, not long before the demobilization he was sent to the two-month courses for politruks.

As the War broke out, Alekseyev was moved to the frontline. "I came in on the War on 3 July 1941, and the Victory was waiting for me at the gates of Golden Prague on 9 May 1945," he wrote later. In 1942 he became a member of the Communist Party of the Soviet Union. Also in 1942 he started to write articles, essays and short stories for regional frontline papers. Up until 1950 Alekseyev stayed with his Army unit in Europe. In 1950-1955 he worked as an editor in a Military publishing house in Moscow. In 1955 he was demobilized in the rank of polkovnik.

=== Career ===
Alekseyev started to write fiction in the late 1940s but his first war-themed thrillers failed to make an impact. His breakthrough came with the War epic Soldiers (1951-1953, Sibirskiye Ogni magazine), the second part of which, Puti-Dorogi (Endless Roads), came out in 1953. It was followed by two short story collections (Our Lieutenant, 1955, There Were Two Friends, 1958), a novella (The Inheritors, 1957) and Divizionka (Division Newspaper), a 1959 book of documentary non-fiction. His 1961 novel The Cherry-Сoloured Pool, about the life of a Russian village, was welcomed by Mikhail Sholokhov, whom Alekseyev later cited as a major influence. In 1966 this book earned him the Maxim Gorky State Prize. It was followed by the novels Bread is a Noun (1964) and Karyukha (1967). The latter, telling the tragic story of Soviet peasant family struggling through 1930s, is regarded as one of Alekseyev's best. The two-part novel Unweeping Willow (1970, 1974), a vast panorama of the 1930s-1960s rural Soviet Privolzhye, earned him the USSR State Prize in 1976. Of the films based upon Alekseyev's novels, the best known are director Nikolai Moskalenko's Zhuravushka (1968, after Bread Is a Noun) and Russian Field (1971, Unweeping Willow).

Mikhail Alekseyev's 1981 controversial novel Fighters dealt with the 1932-1933 famine. "The subject was a taboo then. But it lived within and tormented me. Having published so many books, I've still failed to tell the truth about the thing that had such an impact upon my fellow countrymen, about this immense catastrophe. 1933 was a genocide and the exact figure of its victims has not yet been named," he later wrote. In 1991 another autobiographical novel Ryzhonka came out, seen as part of the autobiographical trilogy, started by Karyukha and Fighters. In 1993 Alekseyev received the Fatherland Prize for his autobiographical war-time novel My Stalingrad (1993); the second part of it came out in 1998 and brought him the Mikhail Sholokhov Prize. "I've made my mind to write only of the things I myself witnessed while fighting in the Autumn 1942 and Winter 1943 between Don and Volga, without making anything up," he explained.

Alekseyev was a staunch communist and, during the ideological feuds between literary 'liberal' and 'patriotic' factions, invariably supported the latter. In 1969 he was among those who signed the infamous Ogoniok-published open letter condemning Novy Mir, and never repented. As a Moskva magazine's editor-in-chief he published Nikolay Karamzin's History of the Russian State in full, which at the time was regarded as a daring challenge to academician Alexander Yakovlev, perestroika's main ideologist. In 1990s Alekseyev criticized Boris Yeltsin and his team of reformists. Outraged by the demolition of the Russian Duma in October 1993, he reacted with the series of angry articles published by Zavtra, Sovetskaya Rossiya and Pravda. Alekseyev's last novel was The Occupants, a sequel to My Stalingrad.

Mikhail Alekseyev died on 21 May 2007 in Moscow and is interred in the Peredelkino Cemetery.
