= Vladilen Mashkovtsev =

Russian poet, writer, and journalist

Vladilen Ivanovich Mashkovtsev
- Владилен Иванович Машковцев
- Vladilen Mashkovtsev (portrait from the book "Magnitnaya gora" (1986))
- Born: 26 September 1929; Tyumen, Ural Oblast, Russian SFSR, Soviet Union (now Tyumen Oblast, Russian Federation)
- Died: 24 April 1997 (aged 67); Magnitogorsk, Chelyabinsk Oblast, Russia
- Resting place: Magnitogorsk
- Citizenship: Soviet Union; Russia
- Education: Gorky Literature Institute
- Writing career
- Notable awards: Several others (see below)

Vladilen Ivanovich Mashkovtsev (Russian: Владилен Иванович Машковцев) (September 26, 1929 – April 24, 1997) was a Russian poet, writer and journalist. He wrote 15 books published in the Urals and in Moscow.

== Biography ==
Vladilen Mashkovtsev was born on September 26, 1929, in Tyumen, Ural Oblast, Russian Soviet Federative Socialist Republic, Union of Soviet Socialist Republics (now Tyumen Oblast, Russian Federation). His father worked as a people's judge.

During the Great Patriotic War, Mashkovtsev studied at the Kurgan Aviation School of Pilots.

In 1947, he arrived in Magnitogorsk, worked as a toolmaker at the repair and mechanical plant of the trust "Magnitostroi".

Mashkovtsev's first publications in the Magnitogorsk press were in 1955. In 1960, his first book of poetry was published by the Chelyabinsk Book Publishing House.

In 1967 he graduated from the Maxim Gorky Literature Institute.

He died on April 24, 1997, in Magnitogorsk.

== Bibliography ==
=== Novels ===
- Zolotoy tsvetok — odolen / Gold Flower Odolen
- Vremya krasnogo drakona / The Red Dragon's Time

=== Poems ===
- Litsom k ognyu / With Face To Fire
- Razdum'ye г mavzoleya / Thoughts At The Mausoleum

=== Poetical cycles ===
- Alye lebedi / Red Swans
- Kazatskie gusli / Kazak's Gusli
- Krasnoye smescheniye / Red Shift
- Lyubov' trevozhnaya / Worried Love
- Magnitka — sud'ba moya / Magnitka, My Destiny
- Molodost' / Youth
- Oranzhevaya magiya / Orange Magic
- Protivorechiya serdtsa / Heart's Contradictions
- Samotsvety / Gems
- Chudo v kovshe / Magic In The Scoop

== Honours and awards ==
- Medal "Veteran of Labour"
- Honorary citizen of Magnitogorsk (1996)
