= Alepino =

Alepino Алепино
- Selo
- Location within Vladimir Oblast Location within Russia
- Coordinates: 56°13′N 39°48′E
- Country: Russia
- Region: Vladimir Oblast
- District: Sobinsky District
- Time zone: UTC+3:00

Alepino (Russian: Алепино) is a rural locality (a selo) in Rozhdestvenskoye Rural Settlement, Sobinsky District, Vladimir Oblast, Russia. The population was 16 as of 2010. There are 4 streets.

== Geography ==
Alepino is located 40 km northwest of Sobinka (the district's administrative centre) by road. Astanikha is the nearest rural locality.
