= Vladimir Soloukhin =

Russian writer (1924–1997)

- Born: June 14, 1924; Alepino, Vladimirsky Uyezd, Vladimir Governorate, Russian SFSR, Soviet Union
- Died: April 4, 1997 (aged 72); Moscow, Russia
- Occupations: Writer, poet

Vladimir Alekseyevich Soloukhin (Russian: Влади́мир Алексе́евич Солоу́хин; June 14, 1924 – April 4, 1997) was a Russian poet and writer.

== Biography ==
Born in Alepino, a village in Vladimirsky Uyezd, he was raised in a peasant family. He attended Vladimir Aviation College, where he studied to be a mechanic. At that time, he published his first poems in a local newspaper; Prizyv (The Call).

After his military service, from 1942 to 1945 in the Kremlin guard, he began his serious literary career, and in 1951 graduated from the Maxim Gorky Literature Institute. From 1958 to 1981, he worked in the editorial offices of the prominent newspaper Molodaya Gvardiya (Young Guard) and in the literary journal Nash Sovremennik (Our Contemporary).

In articles he published during the second half of the 1950s and the beginning of the 1960s, he manifested himself as a Russian patriot, and stressed the need to preserve national traditions; pondering the ways to develop the Russian arts.

His journalistic expressions of opinion during the later years of perestroika idealized pre-revolutionary Russia. In his article "Reading Lenin", Soloukhin was one of the first in Russia to publicly ask for revising the role of Lenin in the history of Russia. At that time, a thesis was popular (and, indeed, was furthered by the authorities), claiming that the crimes of the Stalinist era were a result of "violating Leninist principles", whereas Soloukhin interpreted Stalinism as the logical consequence of Lenin's policies.

The main theme of Soloukhin's work is the Russian countryside, its present and future. His works strives to demonstrate the necessity of preserving the national traditions, and ponders the ways to further develop ethnic Russian art. Vladimir Soloukhin is considered to be a leading figure of the village prose group of writers.

In 1975, the journal Moskva published his autobiographical story “Verdict” («Приговор»), where the protagonist is diagnosed with cancer and undergoes surgical operation; in essence the author is describing thoughts of a person who has received death sentence. The whole edition was bought in two days. Within his works, autobiographical prose takes a distinct position, where the author reflects on the history of Russia during the 20th century. Soloukhin represents Orthodox Christian - nationalist positions, criticizing atheist, internationalist, liberal and communist views.

Soloukhin's book "Searching for Icons in Russia" describes his hobby of collecting icons. He traveled throughout the countryside in the 1950s and 1960s searching for icons. In some instances he discovered beautiful 16th century icons underneath layers of grime and over-painting yet he also finds ancient icons chopped into bits and rotting away.

He was known for his campaign to preserve prerevolutionary Russian art and architecture. Ilya Glazunov painted a portrait of him. He died in Moscow and was buried in his native village.
