= Yury Kazakov =

Russian author (1927–1982)

- Born: August 8, 1927; Moscow, USSR
- Died: November 29, 1982 (aged 55); Moscow, USSR
- Resting place: Vagankovo Cemetery, Moscow
- Education: Maxim Gorky Literature Institute

Yuri Pavlovich Kazakov (Russian: Юрий Павлович Казаков; August 8, 1927 – November 29, 1982) was a Russian author of short stories, often compared to Anton Chekhov and Ivan Bunin. Born in Moscow, he started out as a jazz musician, but turned to publishing his stories in 1952. He attended the Maxim Gorky Literature Institute, graduating in 1958.

== Biography ==
Reportedly, Yuri Kazakov was born to a worker's family in Moscow and grew up in the old Arbat area, which has today been turned into a tourist attraction but in the mid-1900s was the focal point of Russian culture. "The year when Yuri was born, 1927, was a time when the relative freedom of the 1920s was being replaced by the Red Terror of the 1930s [and] Yuri's father was arrested when the future writer was six [because] he had failed to inform on a man who described the horrors of collectivization in a conversation." "Kazakov went to a typical Soviet school in the center of Moscow." "When his father disappeared in the Gulag, the family lived in dire need, [but] Kazakov [continued to] stud[y] at an elite vocational school and the Gnesins music school where he played classical music on the double bass." "For a while he performed in orchestras, but eventually abandoned music."

"In 1958 Kazakov graduated from the Maxim Gorky Literary Institute." "By this time he had already written and published several stories, which were appreciated by such established writers as Konstantin Paustovsky, Viktor Shklovsky, and Ilya Ehrenburg." It's been said that "the writer's early works displayed the influence of Russian classical literature, in particular the writer Ivan Bunin, who had emigrated following the revolution and began to be published in Russia widely again only following Stalin's death."

At the end of the 1950s Kazakov traveled to the north of Russia, and the trip became the subject of several new stories. On the strength of a collection of these stories he joined the Writers' Union in 1958. The North remained one of the most important themes in his work, one to which he returned in more difficult times." However, the authorities adopted a critical attitude to the new writer and the central literary journals stopped publishing him in 1959.

Kazakov emerged as a writer only thanks to the short period in recent Russian history known as the Thaw, but in the mid-1960s, this period gave way to stagnation in culture and public life." "For many years Kazakov worked on a translation into Russian of a Kazakh novel devoted to World War I and the Civil War on the Aral Sea [and] some of his own works were published in Kazakhstan."

In defiance of the situation in the country, Kazakov produced some of his best stories in the 1970s, which dealt with the merging of two souls, the soul of the newborn and the soul of the poet at the end of his life. "The writer considered simple but important problems of birth and death, suicide and suffering. "Kazakov penetrated the mind of the child and presented his view of the world."

The writer's formative years passed under the influence of two major factors: Russian classical literature (in addition to Bunin, Kazakov's early prose bore the imprint of the works of Chekhov and Turgenev) and the Thaw." Kazakov slowly but surely overcame the influence of the classics and developed his own style and voice in his stories as to the Thaw, it petered out gradually, but Kazakov did not take the road of the dissidents or many of the other "men of the sixties", who vacillated between collaboration with the Soviet regime and fawning on the West."

Kazakov died on November 29, 1982, and was buried in Vagankovo Cemetery in Moscow. It has been reported that Kazakov was modest and avoided cheap public relations. In one interview Kazakov summed up his life and world outlook: "We are not great writers, but if we have a serious attitude to our work, then our word will perhaps prompt someone to stop and ponder for at least an hour, for at least a day, the meaning of life. For at least a day! That is so much!"

== Career ==
Kazakov lived in Moscow but spent a good deal of time traveling along the shores of the White Sea, among the provincial towns along the Oka, and in Central Russian Upland and the wooded areas around them. He also spent periods of time with the fishermen of the Russian North. Several of his stories are set in these regions and enhanced by his experiences of life and nature in them.

George Gibian has said that "Kazakov is worthy of note not because of any 'disaffection' or 'dissidence,' but because what he says about his haunting characters set against an impressively captured nature is penetrating, true and beautiful." According to Gibian, Kazakov is distinctive among Russian authors. His work has an intrinsic, intangible quality which makes it unmistakably his. His characters are charged with emotion and tend to have a keen sense of an aspect of nature. Some enjoy the beauty of the visual world, some the scents of the forest, some the sounds of music but all intensely and with heightened senses experience the world around them.

== English translations ==
- The Hound (story), from Such a Simple Thing and Other Stories, FLPH, Moscow, 1959. from Archive.org
- Selected Short Stories, Pergamon Press, 1963.
- Going To Town and Other Stories, Houghton Mifflin, 1964.
- Arcturus the Hunting Hound: And Other Stories, Doubleday, 1968.
- Autumn in the Oak Woods: Short Stories, Moscow: Progress, 1970.
- Adam and Eve (story), from The Portable Twentieth Century Russian Reader, Penguin Classics, 2003.
