= Stanislav Kunyaev =

Russian poet and writer

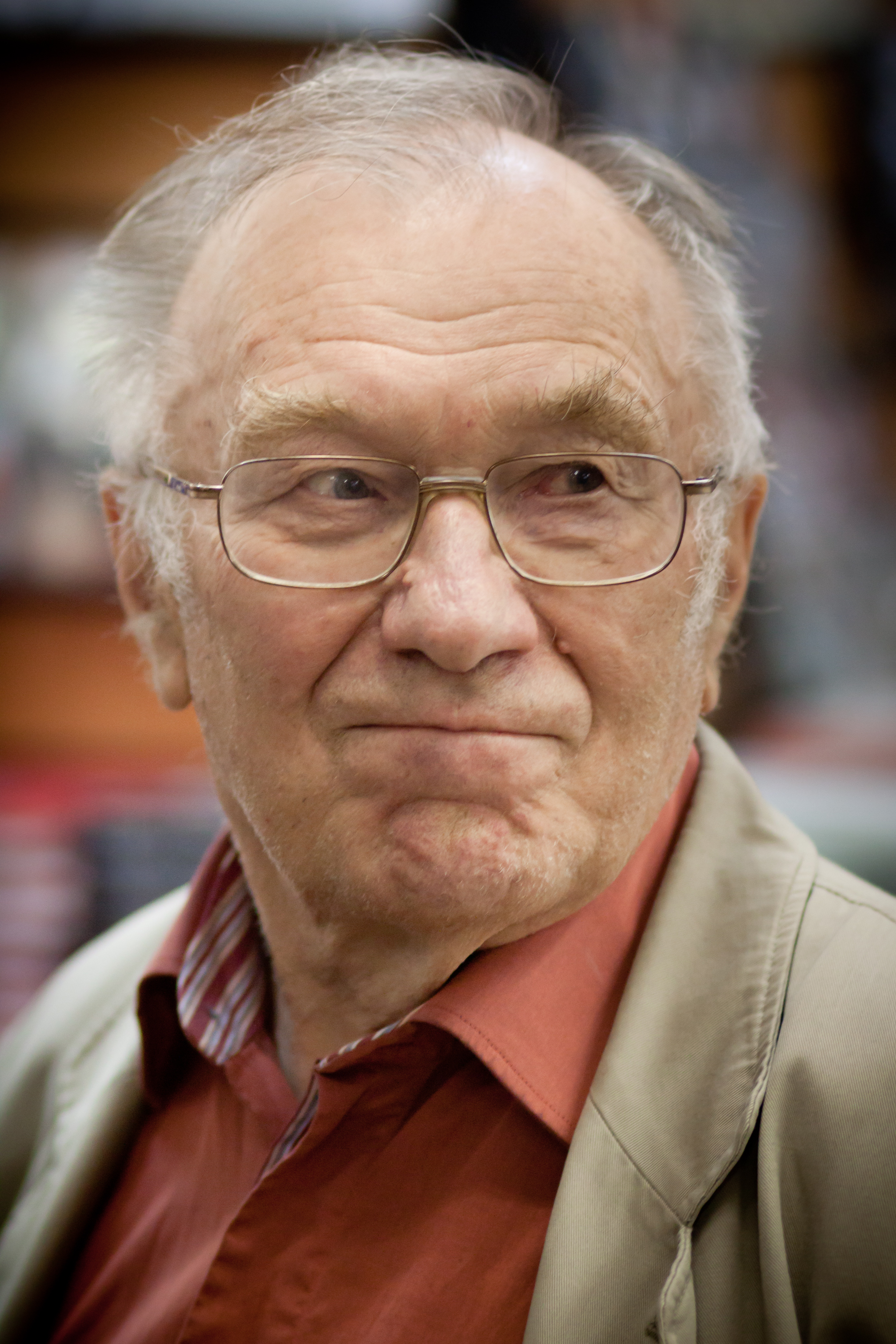
- Born: Stanislav Yuryevich Kunyaev; November 27, 1932 (age 93); Kaluga, Russian SFSR, USSR
- Education: Moscow State University
- Occupations: poet, prose writer, translator, journalist, literary critic, editor
- Years active: 1959 – present

Stanislav Yuryevich Kunyaev (Russian: Станисла́в Ю́рьевич Куня́ев; born November 27, 1932) is a Russian poet, journalist, translator, and literary critic. Since 1989, he has served as editor of literary magazine Nash Sovremennik.

== Biography ==
Kunyaev was born on November 27, 1932, in Kaluga in the Russian SFSR. During the Great Patriotic War, his family was evacuated to the village Pyschug in Kostroma Oblast, where Kunyaev completed his first four grades of primary school. Following the war, the family returned to Kaluga.

From 1952 to 1957, he studied at the Faculty of Philology of Moscow State University, and was a member of national teams for university athletics. While at university, Kunyaev started writing poetry, and his first collection of poems Earth Explorers was published in 1960. Between 1957 and 1960, he worked for the newspaper Zavety Lenina (Tayshet, Irkutsk Oblast), before serving as head of the poetry department of literary magazine Znamya from 1960 to 1963. Kunyaev became a member of the Union of Soviet Writers in 1961. In 1967, having considered that he was in a creative crisis, he left for five years to work in geological parties in the Pamirs, Tien Shan, and the Hissar Range.

From 1976 to 1980, Kunyaev was Secretary of the Moscow Writers' Organization. He was a member of the secretariat of the board of the Writers' Union of Russia.

On August 19, 1991, he supported the State Committee on the State of Emergency's August Coup.

With his son Sergei, Kunyaev published a book about the life and work of Sergei Yesenin in the series The Life of Remarkable People. Kunyaev has written around 20 books including Eternal Companion, Scroll, Manuscript, Deep Day, and Favorites, and has translated poetry from Ukrainian, Georgian, Abkhazian, Kirghiz, Buryat, and Lithuanian.

Between 1992 and 1993, he was a member of the Political Council of the National Salvation Front.

Kunyaev was awarded the Order of Friendship in 2014 for his services to the development of national culture and art.

Stanislav Kunyaev supports the point of view of Holocaust deniers on the total number of dead Jews as repeatedly overestimated by the historiography of the Holocaust.
