= Vasily Belov =

Soviet-Russian writer, poet, and dramatist

- Born: Vasily Ivanovich Belov; 23 October 1932; Northern Krai, RSFSR, USSR
- Died: 4 December 2012 (aged 80); Vologda, Russia
- Writing career
- Genre: Fiction
- Notable works: Eves (1972–1983); The Year of a Major Breakdown (1989–1994)

Vasily Ivanovich Belov (Russian: Васи́лий Ива́нович Бело́в; 23 October 1932 – 4 December 2012) was a Soviet and Russian writer, poet and dramatist, who published more than sixty books which sold (as of 1998) seven million copies. A prominent member of the influential 1970s–1980s derevenschiki movement, Belov's best known novels include Business as Usual (Привычное дело, 1966), Eves (Кануны, 1972–1987), The Best is Yet to Come (Всё впереди, 1986) and The Year of a Major Breakdown (Год великого перелома, 1989–1994).

Vasily Belov was a harsh critic of the Soviet rural policies (particularly collectivization), which he felt were dominated by the cosmopolitan doctrines aiming at repressing the Russian national identity. Even detractors, though, praised Vasily Belov's tough stance on ecological issues and his activities aimed at restoration of the old Russian historic sites and churches. A great admirer of Ivan Ilyin and his legacy, Belov financed the publication of the first Complete Ilyin collection and wrote a preface for it.

Vasily Belov, the USSR State Prize (1981) and the State Prize of the Russian Federation (2003) laureate, was also a recipient of the Order of the Red Banner of Labour (1982), the Order of Lenin (1984), the Order "For Merit to the Fatherland", 4th class (2003) and the Order of Honour (2003).

== Biography ==
Vasily Ivanovich Belov was born in Timonikha, Kharovsky District, Northern Krai, now Vologda Oblast, into a peasant family, the eldest of five children. His father Ivan Belov was killed in 1943 in the Second World War. While at school, Vasily had to work at the local kolkhoz, helping his mother to raise the family. His main memory of childhood, as Belov once recalled, was that of "overbearing hunger, for food and books." In 1949 he joined a professional college in Sokol, Vologda Oblast to learn the craft of carpenter and joiner. After the army he worked in one of the Molotov factories, then in 1956 moved back to Vologda where he started contributing to the regional Communard newspaper. Supported by Aleksander Yashin, an established Vologda writer, Belov in 1959 enrolled into the Maxim Gorky Literature Institute in Moscow.

=== Career ===
In 1961 Vasily Belov's first book of poetry My Small Forest Village was published, along with the Village Berdyaika novella, his debut in prose. In 1963 he became a member of the Union of Soviet Writers and a year later, having graduated the Gorky Institute, returned to Vologda. In 1964 his book of short stories Sultry Summer was published, followed by Beyond the Three Voloks (1965).

It was the novella Privychnoye delo (Business as Usual, 1966) published by Sever magazine, that made Belov a well-known author, its main character Ivan Africanovich soon becoming the village prose movement's token figure. Business as Usual was miles apart from the standards of Socialist realism, and the magazine's editor Dmitry Gusarov even had to place the "To be concluded" tag in the end of it to appease censors who felt the story's finale was "too pessimistic". It was followed in 1968 by the Carpenter Tales short stories collection (published in Aleksandr Tvardovsky's Novy Mir) and then Vologda Bukhtinas (1969) a set of modern local folklore pieces. The leitmotif of the collection Upbringing According to Dr. Spock (1974) was the rural-against-urban lifestyle dilemma, the latter seen by the author as unnatural, amoral and deficient.

In contrast, 1979's Lad (Harmony) compilation of ethnographical essays proved to be Belov's most cheerful book, portraying the traditional Russian rural ways of life as an idyll of man living in harmony with nature. An outspoken opponent of some of the Soviet official policies, Vasily Belov has not for a moment been considered a dissident, having found his ideological stronghold in the opposite corner of the ideological specter. In 1981 he received the USSR State Prize ("For creating works of superb artistic quality"), then the Order of the Red Banner of Labour (1982) and Order of Lenin (1984). In the early 1980s he became one of the leading figures in the Soviet Writers Union and the Russian Federation Writers Union's first secretary. His plays Over the Light Waters, On the 206th, The Immortal Koshchey were running in theatres all over the country, all highlighting the idea of fighting amorality (the natural consequence of urbanization, as he saw it) and concentrating upon preserving the Russian natural riches.

The 1986 The Best is Yet to Come novel, again targeting the urban set of values, caused controversy and brought about heated discussion in the Soviet press. It was followed by Such Was the War (1987), a collection comprising a novel and some short stories. Before that, in 1983, one of Belov's best-known works, the Eves (the novel which he started in 1972) came out, followed by The Year of a Major Breakdown (1989–1991) and The Sixth Hour (The 1932 Chronicle). This epic trilogy, telling the tragic story of three peasant families, became arguably the strongest statement against collectivization in the non-dissident Soviet literature, exploring what the author saw as the conflict between Russian rural traditionalism and the Bolsheviks-imposed 'rootlessness', the latter leading to chaos, mass murder and degradation.

In 1989–1991 Belov published a series of children's books: The Old and the Small, The Little Spring fairytale and others. He started to get involved in the practical politics, first as the People's deputy, then (in 1991–1992) the member of the Supreme Soviet. In 1993–1995 the Sovremennik Publishers issued the first Complete Vasily Belov collection in five volumes. The Honeymoon novella came out in 1996, but by this time Belov became better known as an author of highly emotional essays (appearing mostly in pro-nationalist Moskva, Nash Sovremennik magazines and Zavtra newspaper) on issues like the demise of small Russian villages and the degradation of the Russian language.

In 1997 Vasily Belov became the Honorary citizen of Vologda. In the 2000s he was awarded the Order of Reverend Sergius of Radonezh (2002), the Order "For Merit to the Fatherland", 4th class (2003) and the State Prize of the Russian Federation (2004) for literature and arts. In March 2005 he was a signatory to the antisemitic Letter of 5000.

Vasily Belov devoted his last years to the restoration of the Nikolskaya church in Timonikha where he had been baptized as a child. He financed the project and worked on scaffolds himself. In 2011 the church was robbed and desecrated. On the next day Belov suffered a stroke from which he never fully recovered. Vasily Belov died on 4 December 2012, aged 80, in Vologda.

== Accolades ==
- USSR State Prize (1981)
- State Prize of the Russian Federation (2003)
- Order of the Red Banner of Labour (1982)
- Order of Lenin (1984)
- Order of Reverend Sergius of Radonezh (Russian Orthodox Church, 2002)
- Order "For Merit to the Fatherland", 4th class (2003)
- Order of Honour (2008)

== Selected works ==
- My Small Forest Village (Деревенька моя лесная, 1961, poetry collection)
- Village Berdyaika (Деревня Бердяйка, 1961, novelet)
- Sultry Summer (Знойное лето, 1963, short stories)
- Beyond the Three Voloks (За тремя волоками, 1965, novelet)
- Business as Usual (Привычное дело, 1966, novelet)
- The Carpenter's Tales (Плотницкие рассказы, 1968, short stories)
- Vologda's Buktinas (Бухтины волгодские, 1969, a collection of modern local folklore)
- Eves (Кануны, 1972–1983, a novel in three parts)
- The Upbringing According to Dr. Spock (Воспитание по доктору Споку, 1974, short stories)
- The Best is Yet to Come (Всё впереди, 1986, novel)
- Such Was the War (Такая была война, 1987, a collection of wartime prose)
- The Year of a Major Breakdown (Год великого перелома, 1989–1991, novel)
- The Sixth Hour. The 1932 chronicle (Час шестый. Хроника 1932 года, novel)
- The Old and the Small (Старый да малый, 1990, novelet)
- Honeymoon (Медовый месяц, 1996, novelet)

== See also ==
- Village Prose
