= Union of Writers of Russia =

Creative union of professional writers in Russia

The Union of Writers of Russia (Russian: Союз писателей России, romanized: Soyuz pisatelei Rossii) is a creative union of professional writers in Russia. It is the successor of the Union of RSFSR Writers, which was founded in 1958. The Union of Writers of Russia has 90 branches in the regions of Russia and other countries.

== Activities ==
The main tasks of the Union are:

- preservation of a single cultural, literary and informational field in the Russian Federation;
- assistance to the preservation and development of the Russian language and literature, as well as languages and literatures of other peoples of the multinational Russian Federation; meeting the needs of the peoples of the world who want to join the Russian language and literature;
- creation of conditions for the realization of the creative abilities of the members of the Union and beginning writers;
- strengthening the creative community of writers of the Russian Federation, as well as other countries of the world;
- development of initiatives for the adoption at the state and regional level of legislative decisions to improve domestic book publishing, translation, remuneration of authors' work, provide them with social and other support;
- organization of actions and events aimed at promoting the achievements of classical and modern Russian literature;
- concern for the preservation of the literary heritage, assistance to young writers;
- exchange of experience between Russian writers and writers from foreign countries.

== Chairmen ==
The post of chairman of the Union of Writers of Russia has been held by:

- Leonid Sobolev (1958-1970)
- Sergey Mikhalkov (1970-1990)
- Yuri Bondarev (1991-1994)
- Valery Ganichev (1994–2018)
- Nikolai Ivanov (2018-2025)
- Vladimir Medinsky (2025-present)

The secretary of the board of directors is Vasily Nikolaevich Popov.

== Scandals ==
Gennady Rakitin was a hoax created by anti-war Russians who composed various Nazi-inspired verses praising Vladimir Putin and the war against Ukraine. In June 2024, one of Rakitin's poems won a prize at an All-Russian Patriotic Poetry Competition held by the Union of Writers of Russia Kaluga branch.

== See also ==
- List of Russian language writers
