= Moskva (magazine) =

Russian literary magazine

- Editor: Vladislav Artyomov
- Frequency: Monthly
- Circulation: 3500 (2009)
- First issue: 1957
- Country: Russian Federation
- Based in: Moscow
- Language: Russian

Moskva (Москва, Moscow) is a Russian monthly literary magazine founded in 1957 in Moscow. It is published on a monthly basis.

== History ==
Moskva magazine was established in 1957, originally as an organ of the RSFSR Union of Writers and its Moscow department. Its first editor was Nikolay Atarov (1957–1958), succeeded by Yevgeny Popovkin (1958–1968). It was during his time that Mikhail Bulgakov's The Master and Margarita was published for the first time (in the December 1966 and January 1967 issues).

The magazine's third editor-in-chief Mikhail Alekseyev brought its selling figures to record highs (775,000 in 1989) and made history too by publishing Nikolay Karamzin's History of the Russian State (1989–1990) for the first time since 1917. In the 1990s and 2000s, under Vladimir Krupin (1990–1992) and Leonid Borodin (1992–2008), Moskva, along with Nash Sovremennik magazine and Alexander Prokhanov-edited Den and Zavtra newspapers, moved into the vanguard of the so-called 'spiritual opposition' movement. In 1993 the subtitle, The Magazine of Russian Culture, was added to its title page.

In the 2000s, under Borodin (who in 2009 became the magazine's general director), self-proclaimed 'Russian nationalist' Sergey Sergeyev (2009–2010) and Vladislav Artyomov (2012– ), Moskva's popularity declined, with circulation figures dropping to 3500. Still, it was here that Dmitry Rogozin chose to publish his 2011 novel Baron Zholtok.
