= Vadim Kozhinov =

Soviet and Russian critic, philosopher and historian (1930-2001)

- Born: July 5, 1930
- Died: January 25, 2001 (aged 70)
- Occupation: Literary critic, literary scholar, polymath
- Website: web.archive.org/web/20260000000000*/www.kozhinov.ru

Vadim Valerianovich Kozhinov (Russian: Вадим Валерианович Кожинов; July 5, 1930 - January 25, 2001) was a Soviet and Russian critic, philosopher and historian. Since 1965 — member of the Union of writers of the USSR.

He was born in Moscow in the family of engineer. In 1954, he graduated with honors from the Philological Faculty of Moscow State University. He studied at the graduate school of the Gorky Institute of World Literature and then worked there. In 1958 he defended his Candidat dissertation. He was a student of Evald Ilyenkov. Kozhinov was influenced by Mikhail Bakhtin. Kozhinov influenced Natalya Narochnitskaya.

He is the author of more than 30 books. He wrote a book about Fyodor Tyutchev, published in the series The Lives of Remarkable People.

He was buried at the Vvedenskoye Cemetery.
