= Village prose =

Movement in Soviet literature

Village prose (Russian: Деревенская проза, or Деревенская литература) was a movement in Soviet literature beginning during the Khrushchev Thaw, which included works that focused on the Soviet rural communities. Some point to the critical essays on collectivization in Novyi mir by Valentin Ovechkin as the starting point of village prose, though most of the subsequent works associated with the genre are fictional novels and short stories. Authors associated with village prose include Aleksander Yashin, Fyodor Abramov, Boris Mozhayev, Vasily Belov, Viktor Astafyev, Vladimir Soloukhin, Vasily Shukshin, and Valentin Rasputin. Some critics also count Aleksandr Solzhenitsyn among the village prose writers for his short novel Matryona's Place.

Many village prose works espoused an idealized picture of traditional Russian village life and became increasingly associated with Russian nationalism in the 1970s and 1980s. Some have argued that the nationalist subtext of village prose is the reason the Soviet government remained supportive of village prose writers like Valentin Rasputin (who became a member of the Writers' Union) during the Time of Stagnation, even while they began to more heavily censor other dissenting movements, like Youth and Urban Prose.

== See also ==
- Fyodor Abramov
- Valentin Rasputin
- Vasily Belov
- Viktor Astafyev
- Aleksander Yashin
- Aleksandr Solzhenitsyn
- Vladimir Soloukhin
- Russian literature
