= Fyodor Abramov =

Soviet writer

- Born: 29 February 1920; Verkola, Arkhangelsk Oblast, Russian SFSR
- Died: 14 May 1983 (aged 63); Leningrad, Soviet Union

Fyodor Aleksandrovich Abramov (Russian: Фёдор Алекса́ндрович Абра́мов) (29 February 1920 – 14 May 1983) was a Russian novelist and literary critic. His work focused on the challenging lives of the Russian peasant class, often depicting their struggles and hardships. Although his writing was critically acclaimed, he frequently faced reprimands for deviating from Soviet policy on writing.

== Biography ==
Abramov was from a peasant background. He studied at Leningrad State University, but interrupted his studies to serve as a soldier in World War II. In 1951, he finished his schooling at the university, then remained a teacher until 1960. After leaving teaching in 1960, he became a full-time writer.

His 1954 essay, "People in the Kolkhoz Village in Postwar Prose", which critiqued the glorified portrayal of life in Communist Soviet Villages, was denounced by the Writers' Union and the Central Committee. In a later essay, Abramov argued for the repeal of the law denying peasants internal passports and recommended granting them larger shares of the profits from their labor. This essay led to his removal from the editorial staff of the journal Neva.

His first novel entitled, "Bratya i syostri" ("Brothers and Sisters") written in 1958 depicted the harsh life of northern Russian villagers during World War II. Abramov wrote two sequels: "Dve zimy i tri leta" ("Two Winters and Three Summers", 1968), and "Puti-pereputya" (“Paths and Crossroads”, 1973). He also wrote a fourth novel in 1978 called "Dom" ("The House").

Abramov started another novel, "Chistaya kniga", but unfortunately did not finish it before his death in May 1983.

The asteroid 3409 Abramov, discovered by Soviet astronomer Nikolai Chernykh in 1977, is named after him.

== English Translations ==
- The Dodgers, Flegon Press in association with Anthony Blond, 1963.
- The New Life: A Day on a Collective Farm, Grove Press, 1963. (Alternative translation of The Dodgers)
- Two Winters and Three Summers, Harcourt Brace Jovanovich, 1984.
- The Swans Flew By and Other Stories, Raduga Publishers, 1986.
- "Olesha's Cabin" in The Barsukov Triangle, the Two-Toned Blond and other Stories, Ardis, 1984.

== Novels ==
- Bratya i syostri (Brothers and Sisters), 1958.
- Dve zimy i tri leta (Two Winters and Three Summers), 1968.
- Puti-pereputya (Paths and Crossroads), 1973.
- Dom (The House), 1978.
- "Chistaya kniga" ("Clean book"), Unfinished

== Sources ==
- "Fyodor Abramov", Encyclopædia Britannica, 2009, Encyclopædia Britannica Online, 5 May 2009
