= Aleksandr Fiodorovich Sevastianov =

Russian naturalist (1771–1824)

Alexander Fyodorovich Sevastyanov
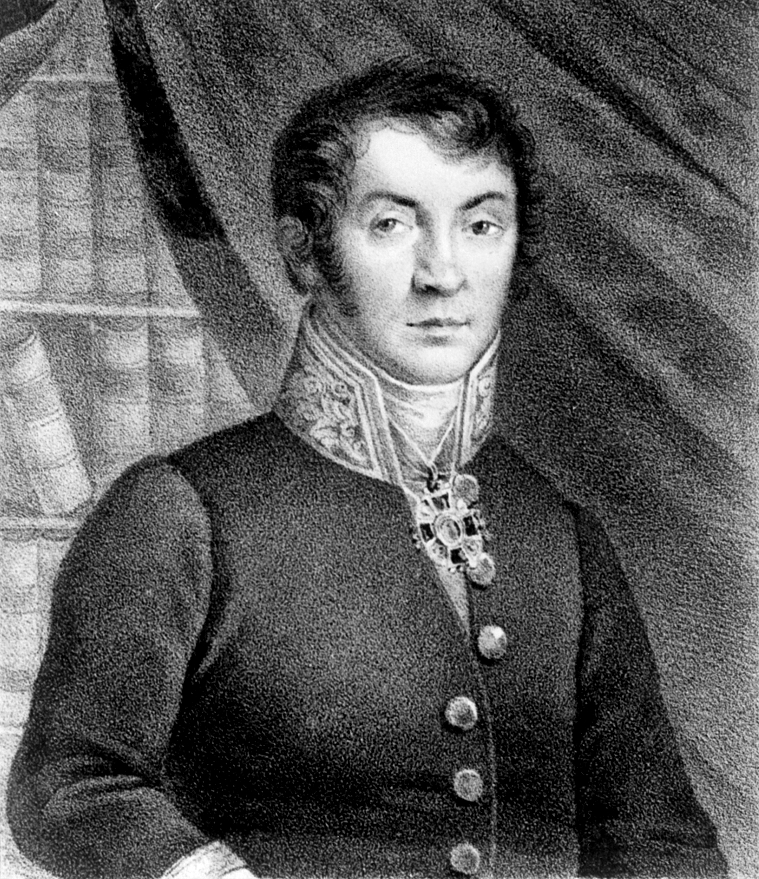
- Lithograph, 1841
- Born: 1 July 1771; Yegoryevsky Uyezd, Ryazan Governorate
- Died: 5 December 1824 (aged 53); Saint Petersburg
- Education: Academic Gymnasium
- Known for: Zoology, geology, paleontology; translations of Linnaeus, Humboldt, Saussure
- Awards: Honorary member of the Linnean Society of London (1809)
- Scientific career
- Fields: Paleontology, zoology, geology
- Workplaces: Imperial Academy of Sciences

Aleksandr Fiodorovich Sevastianov, also written as Alexander Fyodorovich Sevastyanov, (Russian: Александр Фёдоровичl Севастьянов; 1 July 1771, Ryazan Governorate – 5 December 1824, Saint Petersburg) was a Russian naturalist, poet, translator, and academician of the Imperial Academy of Sciences (from 1800). He was a member of many Russian and foreign scientific societies, including an honorary member of the Linnean Society of London (1809).

== Biography ==
He was born on 26 March 1770 or 1 July 1771 or 19 December 1771 in the village of Nesterovo (Yegoryevsky Uyezd, Ryazan Governorate) to a noble family.

On 31 December 1781, he entered service as a furier in the Leib Guard Preobrazhensky Regiment.

In 1790, he graduated from the Academic Gymnasium and was promoted to army captain. For four years he served with Count F. A. Anhalt and in 1794 became a translator for Prince P. A. Zubov. Promoted to major on 30 June 1796, he resigned on 14 December of the same year "to civil service," being given the rank of Collegiate assessor and appointed librarian to the Tsarevich Constantine Pavlovich.

Interested in the natural sciences, he attended lectures in zoology at the Academy Museum. On 16 September 1799, he presented his dissertation in French, Réflexions sur les bornes des deux règnes de la nature, l’animal et le végétal, ou sur les vrais signes distinctifs des corps, qui les composent ("Reflections on the boundaries of the two kingdoms of nature, the animal and the plant, or on the true distinctive signs of the bodies which compose them"), and on 4 November 1799 he was admitted to the Academy as an adjunct, while remaining librarian to the Tsarevich.

In 1802 he fulfilled a commission from Alexander I, transporting the collections acquired from the Jabłonowski princes from Siemiatycze to Saint Petersburg, for which he received Imperial gratitude. From 21 December 1802, he was a member of the Free Society of Lovers of Literature, Science, and the Arts. On 25 August 1803, he was elected extraordinary academician. In 1808–1809 he lectured in zoology and mineralogy at the Imperial Military Medical Academy, and on 2 January 1810 he was elected ordinary academician in zoology. As academician, he twice served on the Academy's governing committee (1811–1813 and 1820).

He conducted research in zoology, paleontology, and geology. He sharply criticized Neptunism at the height of its popularity. In his translation of A. G. Werner’s lectures, he included remarks by other scholars doubting Werner's theory. He translated works of C. Linnaeus, A. von Humboldt, H. B. de Saussure and others into Russian.

In 1802 he first described the Emperor goose. From 1806, he was a full member of the Moscow Society of Naturalists.

He died on 5 December 1824 in Saint Petersburg.

His son was Yakov Alexandrovich Sevastyanov (1796–1849), a major general of the Imperial Russian Corps of Communications Engineers.

== Literary activity ==
Sevastyanov began his literary activity while in the Preobrazhensky Regiment, publishing a translation of "Description of Lake Geneva" in New Monthly Writings in 1789. Between 1789 and 1793, he published several original and translated poems, including "The Superiority of Reason" (vol. LVI), "The Gardener, the Caterpillar and the Butterfly" (vol. LXXIV), "An Imitation of the Allegorical Verses of Mme Deshoulières" (vol. LXXV), "Ode for the New Year 1793 to Their Imperial Highnesses Alexander Pavlovich and Constantine Pavlovich" (vol. LXXXI; also published separately, St. Petersburg, 1793), and "Ode to Her Imperial Majesty Catherine II on the Celebration of Peace with the Porte, 2 September 1793" (vol. LXXXVIII).

He also published numerous scientific papers on natural history, technology, agriculture, medicine, and geography in journals such as New Monthly Writings, Scholarly News (1802), the Technological Journal (1804–1815), its Supplement (1815), and Proceedings of the Academy of Sciences (1821–1823). His independent publications included translations of Linnaeus, Buffon, Saussure, Humboldt, and Chateaubriand.
