= Alexander Galich =

Alexander Galich may refer to:

- Alexander Galich (philosopher) (1783–1848), Russian teacher, philosopher, and writer
- Alexander Galich (writer) (1918–1977), Soviet Russian poet, screenwriter, playwright, singer-songwriter, and dissident
