= Vasily Pronin =

Soviet politician

- Василий Пронин
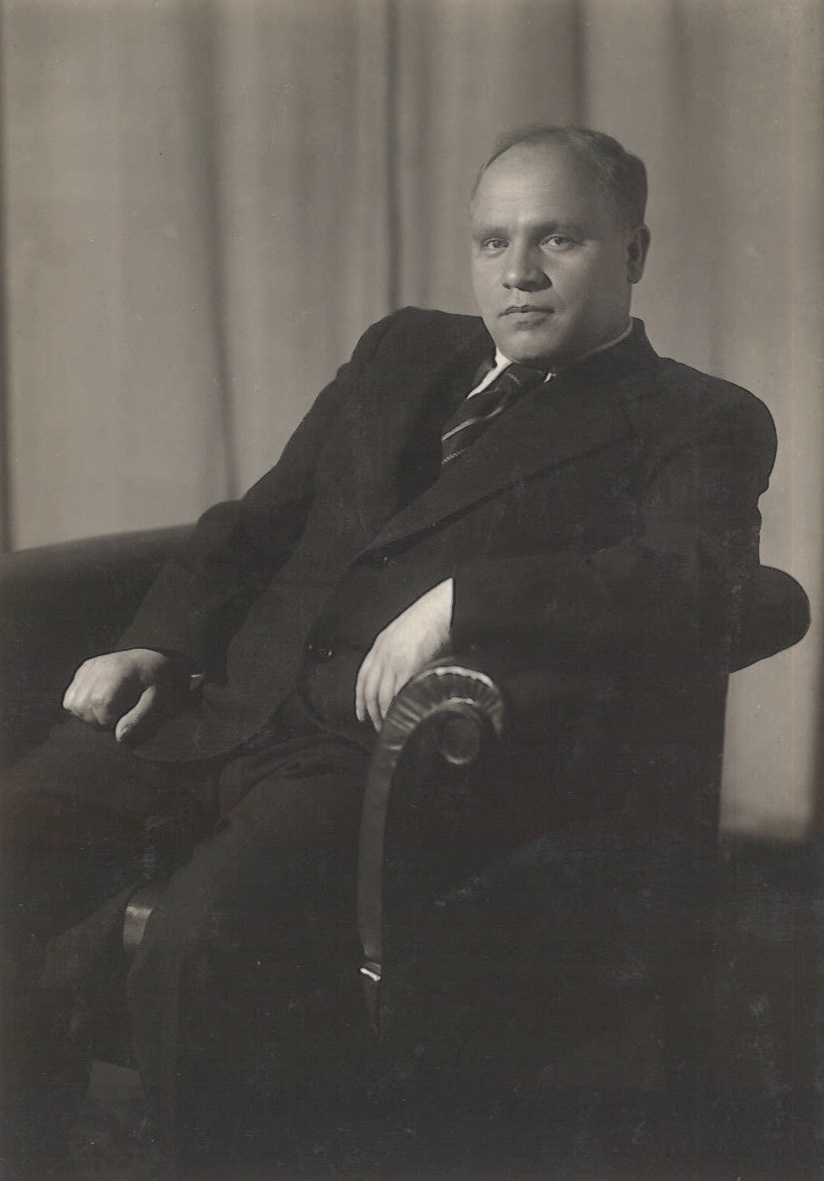
- Pronin in 1943

Minister of Workforce Reserves
- In office 15 May 1946 – 15 March 1953
- Premier: Joseph Stalin
- Preceded by: Position established
- Succeeded by: Position abolished

Chairman of the Executive Committee of the Moscow City Council
- In office 14 April 1939 – 7 December 1944
- Preceded by: Aleksandr Yefremov
- Succeeded by: Georgy Popov

Personal details
- Born: 25 December 1905 Pavlovo village, Yegoryevsky Uyezd, Ryazan Governorate, Russian Empire
- Died: 12 October 1993 (aged 87) Moscow, Russia
- Resting place: Kuntsevo Cemetery
- Party: CPSU (1925)

Vasily Prokhorovich Pronin (Russian: Василий Прохорович Пронин; 25 December 1905 – 12 October 1993) was a Soviet statesman and chairman of the executive committee of the Moscow City Council of Laborers' Deputies (today's equivalent of mayor) between 14 April 1939 and 7 December 1944.

== Life and career ==
Vasily Pronin was born into a peasant family in the village of Pavlovo in Yegoryevsky Uyezd. As a young man, he earned his living by working as a farm laborer, repairman at the Nizhny Novgorod Railway, switcher at the Moscow Railway, and factory turner. In 1925, Pronin joined the ranks of the All-Union Communist Party (Bolsheviks) and engaged himself in Komsomol and party activities. Later on he graduated from the Institute of Red Professors and moved to Tuva on a party assignment. In 1938, Vasily Pronin was appointed secretary of the Moscow City Committee of the Communist Party and then became chairman of the executive committee of the Moscow City Council in April 1939.

Vasily Pronin contributed significantly to the fulfillment of the General Plan for the Reconstruction of Moscow. In 1939–1940, they rid the capital of seasonality in housing development, introduced the method of rapid-flow construction, and commenced large-scale multi-story housing development throughout the city. By 1941, they had constructed 13 massive bridges and 45 km of granite embankments and doubled the capacity of water-supply network. Under Pronin's supervision, they strengthened the capital's anti-aircraft defense, built and reinforced bomb shelters, adjusted the Moscow Metro for the needs of sheltering of population in case of air raids, and conducted civil defense drills around the city. In the summer of 1940, Vasily Pronin was awarded the Order of Lenin for his success in constant developing and improvement of the municipal services of Moscow.

From the first days of the Great Patriotic War, Moscow City Council and its executive committee aimed all of its efforts at the mobilization, reserve training for the Red Army, and translation of the State Defense Committee’s decisions into production of ammunition, weapons, and military outfit. They rebuilt the defense industry in Moscow after the evacuation of several factories inland. By the early December 1940, 654 factories out of 670 in direct subordination to the Moscow City Council had already been producing ammunition and weapons. Vasily Pronin personally participated in coordination of work of 50 factories, producing components for the Katyusha multiple rocket launchers and ammunition. In August 1941, they completed the government contract in record short time and sent the first sets of the Katyushas to the front. Also, Pronin took part in organizing militias and other volunteer formations, evacuating equipment and people, constructing a fortified belt along the distant approaches and outskirts of Moscow, and improving the anti-aircraft defense. Vasily Pronin was also in charge of the mining of Moscow, most of which would have been blown up in case of German occupation.

As a member of the Military Council of the Moscow Military District and Moscow Zone of Defense, Vasily Pronin together with the first secretary of the Moscow City Council and Moscow City Committee of the Communist Party Alexander Shcherbakov rendered great assistance to the State Defense Committee and Western Front command in organizing the defense of the capital in the fall and winter of 1941. In late 1944, Pronin was appointed first deputy chairman of the Council of People's Commissars of the Russian SFSR. Later in his life, he held different posts, such as deputy minister and minister of several all-union and republican ministries. Vasily Pronin was elected deputy of the Supreme Soviet of the Soviet Union and RSFSR and member of the Presidium of the Supreme Soviet of the Soviet Union.

In 1957, Vasily Pronin was forced to retire at the age of 52 as a result of Nikita Khrushchev's campaign to purge the party of Joseph Stalin's associates. He died in 1993 in Moscow.
