= Aleksandr Leping =

Aleksandr Andreyevich Leping (Alexander Leping, Russian: Александр Андреевич Лепинг; 29 January 1894 in St. Petersburg – 6 April 1968 in Moscow) was a Soviet and Russian linguist and lexicographer.

Aleksandr Leping was born in St. Petersburg in a Baltic German family. His father Andrei Leping who had partly also Latvian roots was a hereditary honorary citizen, inspector of the English Commercial School. His mother Louise Leping (née von Johannsen) was a teacher. Aleksandr graduated from Saint Peter's School in St. Petersburg in 1911, studied at Yuryev and St. Petersburg universities (1911–1914), then graduated with honours from Moscow State Pedagogical Institute in 1937. He was a World War I veteran and served in the Red Army in 1917–1923.

Leping worked as a teacher, head of department, dean of the Faculty of German at Moscow State Pedagogical Institute of Foreign Languages. He authored several fundamental German-Russian and Russian-German dictionaries.

He is buried at Vvedenskoye Cemetery in Moscow.

== Literature ==
- Leping, Aleksandr. Russisch-deutsches Wörterbuch. Moskva : Izdatel'stvo Russkij Jazyk, 1988
- Leping, Aleksandr. Nemecko-russkij slovar. Teil: A-J. Moskva : Gosudarstvennoe izdatel'stvo inostrannych i nacional'nych slovarey, 1962
- Leping, Aleksandr. Nemecko-russkij slovar. Teil: J-Z. Moskva : Gosudarstvennoe izdatel'stvo inostrannych i nacional'nych slovarey, 1962
