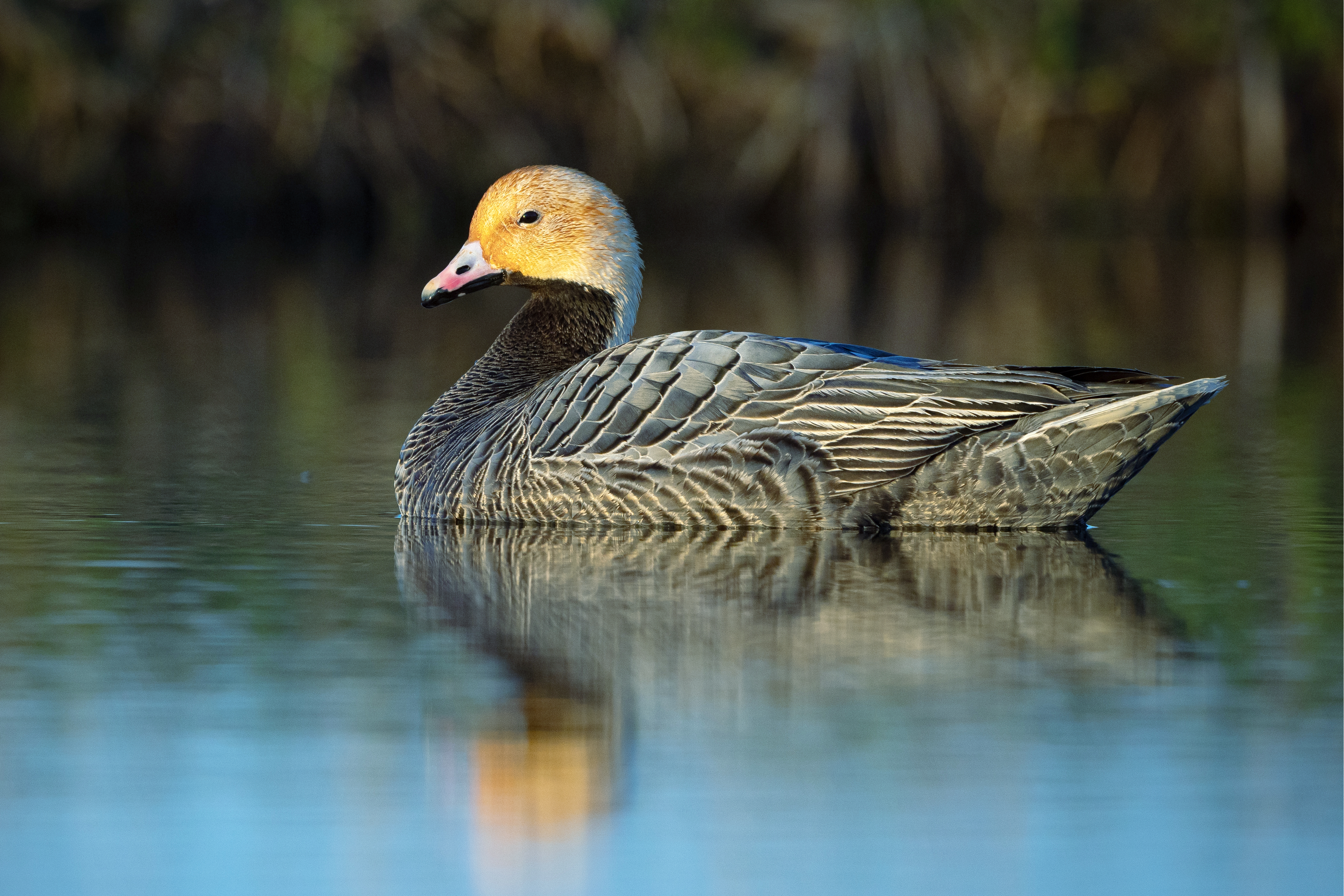
- Emperor goose on a tundra pond on Kigigak Island, Yukon Delta National Wildlife Refuge

Conservation status
- Least Concern (IUCN 3.1)

- Vulnerable (NatureServe)

Scientific classification
- Kingdom: Animalia
- Phylum: Chordata
- Class: Aves
- Order: Anseriformes
- Family: Anatidae
- Genus: Anser
- Species: A. canagicus

Binomial name
- Anser canagicus (Sevastianov, 1802)

Synonyms
- Anas canadicus; Anas canagica (protonym); Ansas canagicus; Anser canagica; Anser pictus; Bernicla canagica; Bernicla picta; Chen canagica; Chloephaga canagica; Chloephaga picta; Chloephaga pictus; Philacte canadica; Philacte canagica Bannister, 1870; Philacte canagicus

= Emperor goose =

Species of bird

The emperor goose (Anser canagicus), also known as the beach goose or the painted goose, is a waterfowl species in the family Anatidae, which contains the ducks, geese, and swans. In summer, the emperor goose is found in remote coastal areas near the Bering Sea in arctic and sub-arctic Alaska and the Russian Far East, where it breeds in monogamous pairs. It migrates south to winter in ice-free mudflats and coasts in Alaska, mostly the Aleutian Islands, and Canada's British Columbia, rarely reaching the contiguous United States. Listed as near threatened by the International Union for Conservation of Nature, the species' population is declining due to threats such as pollution, hunting, and climate change.

== Taxonomy ==
The emperor goose was described in 1802 as Anas canagica. Its type locality is Kanaga Island, which is located in the Aleutian Islands, Alaska. The species has sometimes been classified in the genus Chen and less commonly in its own genus, Philacte.

== Description ==
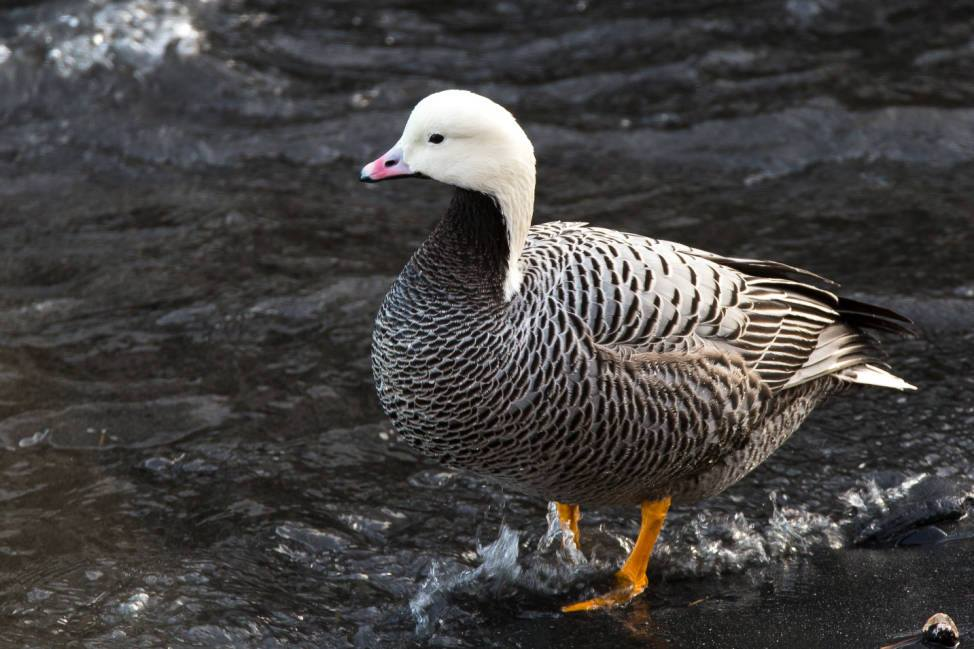
An adult emperor goose in Alaska Maritime National Wildlife Refuge.

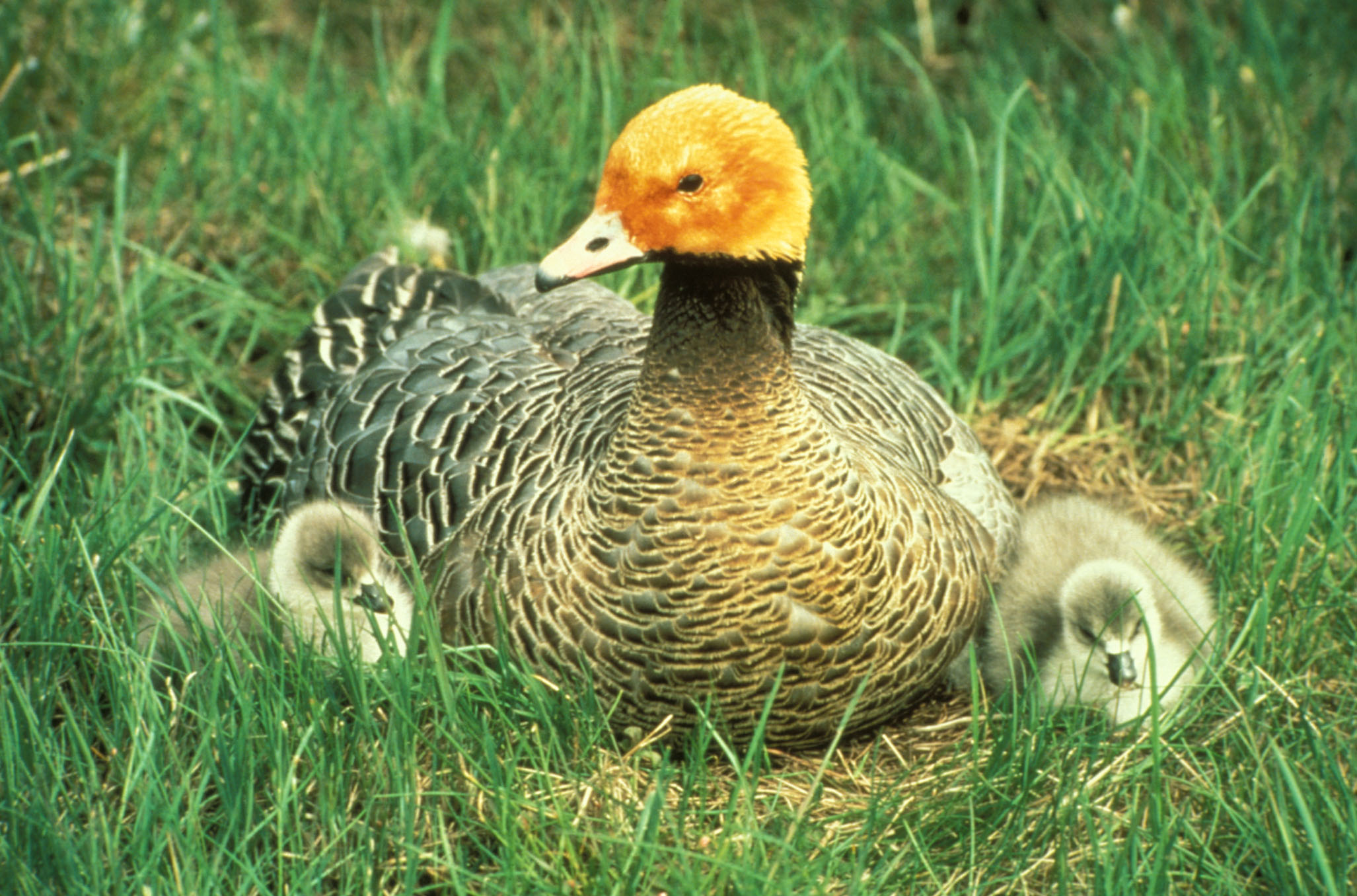
Stained head in summer

The emperor goose has a stout blue-gray body, with spots of black and white, which cause it to have a "scaled appearance". Its head and the back of its neck are white and tinged with amber-yellow; unlike the snow goose, the white does not extend to the front of the neck.

The goose is also characterized by a black chin and throat, a white tail, a pink bill, which is tipped with white, and yellow-orange legs and feet. The underside of the emperor goose's wings is gray, unlike the snow goose, which has black and white on the underside of its wings. The head of adults frequently turns to a reddish-brown color in summer, due to its feeding in tidal pools with iron oxide.

Goslings (i.e. young shortly after hatching) are grayish-white colored; unlike adults, their bill is black. Goslings are also distinguished from adults by having gray, brown, or black feet and an area of white surrounding the bill for the first three weeks after hatching.

Juveniles (i.e. immature specimens older than goslings) are mostly gray colored, with a small amount of white on their feathers. Younger juveniles have a dark head and neck, with their head being dusty-colored with patches of white. However, after October, their head and upper neck turn to mostly white, although they still have scattered darker feathers. By the first winter, juveniles have the same coloring and features as adults.

=== Measurements and weight ===
Adult males grow to a total length of 26–28 inches (66–71 cm) and females 25.6–27.5 inches (65–70 cm).

Other measurements in males, sampled from four specimens in Alaska and California, include a 2.5–2.98-inch (6.4–7.6 cm) tarsus (lower leg), a 1.42–1.6-inch (3.6–4.1 cm) bill, and a 13.5–15.5-inch (34–39 cm) folded wing. These measurements are similar in females, but females have a slightly shorter folded wing of 14.75–15.45 inches (37.5–39.2 cm) based on two Alaskan individuals. The goose has a wingspan of 119 centimetres (47 in). Because of its short wings, it flies slowly, requiring quick strokes.

Males weigh between 2.766 kilograms (6.10 lb) and 3.129 kilograms (6.90 lb). They have a mean weight of 2.316 kilograms (5.11 lb), while females have a mean weight of 1.945 kilograms (4.29 lb). The average weight of juveniles is 1.165 kilograms (2.57 lb) in males and 1.107 kilograms (2.44 lb) in females. Roughly 5–7.5 weeks after hatching, the goose averages a weight of 2.370 kilograms (5.22 lb) and 1.926 kilograms (4.25 lb) in males and females, respectively. It has a heavy body and short neck compared to other geese. Although the species can live to age 25 in captivity, it reaches age 12 in the wild.

== Behavior ==
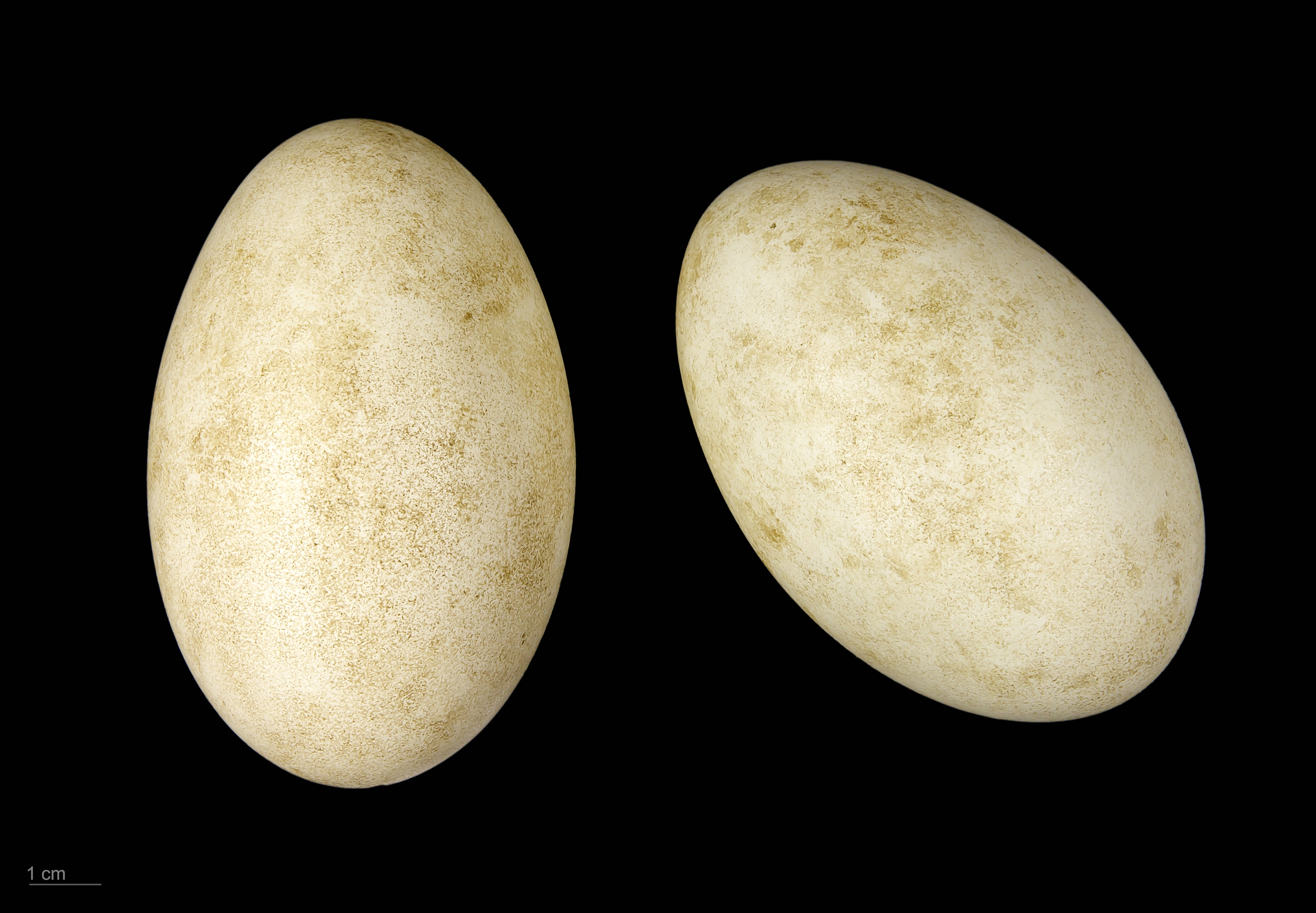
Eggs

Sound of the emperor goose

The emperor goose is migratory, traveling north in the summer to breed and south for the winter. Unlike many goose species, which migrate thousands of miles, the emperor goose travels a few hundred miles for migration, usually about 370 miles (600 km) to 470 miles (760 km). Breeding birds molt near the breeding colonies, but geese unsuccessful with breeding move to either St. Lawrence Island or the Chukchi Peninsula to molt prior to the main southerly migration for winter.

=== Breeding ===
The breeding season starts in late June in Russia, but begins a few weeks earlier in Alaska, generally between 20 May and 3 June. Only individuals three years or older will mate. A monogamous species, female emperor geese have a single mate throughout their life and only mate with any other male if their mate dies. The species molts from late July to early August and leaves its breeding grounds later than any other species.

The emperor goose breeds on tundra, building its nests in areas 10 miles (16 km) or closer to the coast. The nests are typically constructed in marshes. They are built as holes in the ground without containing nesting material, but are later built up with vegetation, such as leaves, and feathers, which the female plucks from herself.

The species usually lays 4–6 eggs, but it can lay anywhere from 2 to 8; eggs are often laid in the nests of other emperor geese families. Eggs measure 7.86 centimetres (3.09 in) by 5.21 centimetres (2.05 in) on average, with an elliptical shape and a smooth shell. They are initially white colored, but become speckled with stains from their nest. Egg incubation, usually lasting 24 days, is performed only by females.

According to The Game Birds of California, a 1918 book, surveys of the species' nests showed that the male did not stay with the nest. However, the Beardsley Zoo says that although the male does not help build the nest, it defends it. The eggs hatch in late June and early July. Exhibiting precociality, young are able to walk and swim hours after hatching, as well as feed themselves. They typically vacate the nest the same day as their hatching, although they do not wander far from their parents until after two months. Young can fly once 50−60 days old. 10% of emperor geese remain alive after their first year.

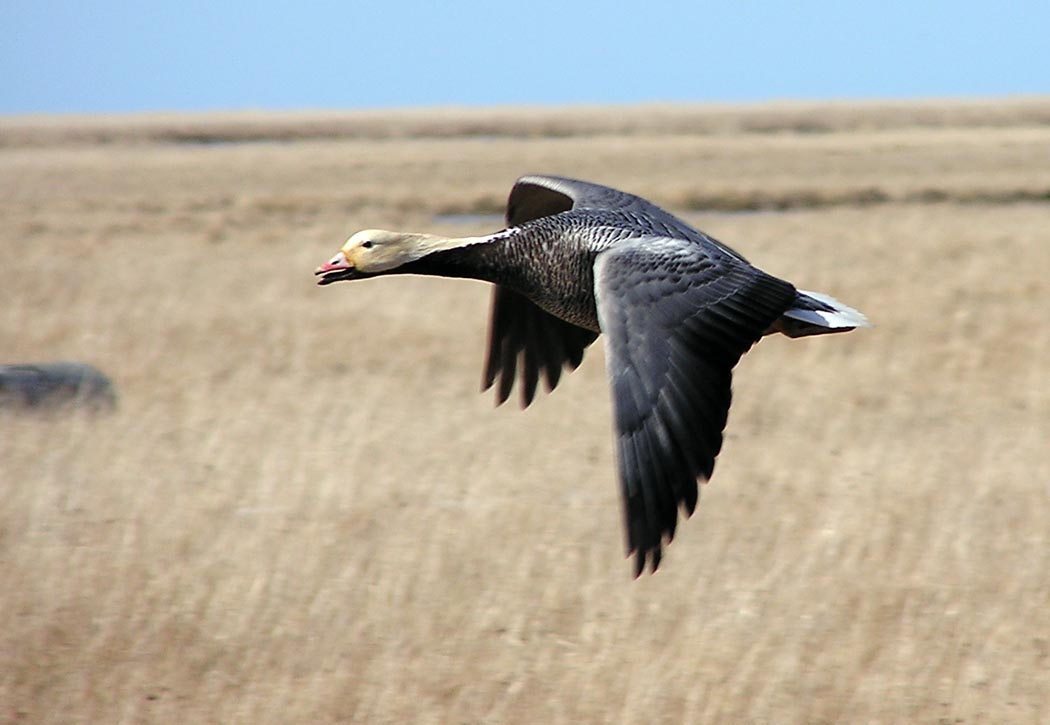
Flying close to the ground

Individuals of the species usually only interact with their family; however, larger flocks collect during the breeding season and the molting season. It is one of the most unsocial goose species; the only goose less social than it is the black brant. It stays low when flying, usually keeping below 90 feet (27 m) above the ground and often coming close to touching the ground with its wings.

=== Diet ===
In the summer, the species' diet consists of vegetation, such as shoots, roots, and berries, while in the winter it primarily eats bivalve molluscs (which it uses its sense of touch to catch) and algae.

Unlike other goose species, its diet mostly consists of animals, causing its flesh to have a strong flavor. When living near water, it eats at the edge of water bodies, which has given it the name "Beach Goose". If the species feels threatened, it goes into a body of water and swims away until the threat is a safe distance from it.

=== Vocalizations ===
Its vocalizations, according to Edward William Nelson, sound like "kla-ha, kla-ha, kla-ha", and can be differentiated from those of other geese by having a more "nasal" sound. It vocalizes less often than other geese, such as the white-fronted goose.

== Habitat and distribution ==
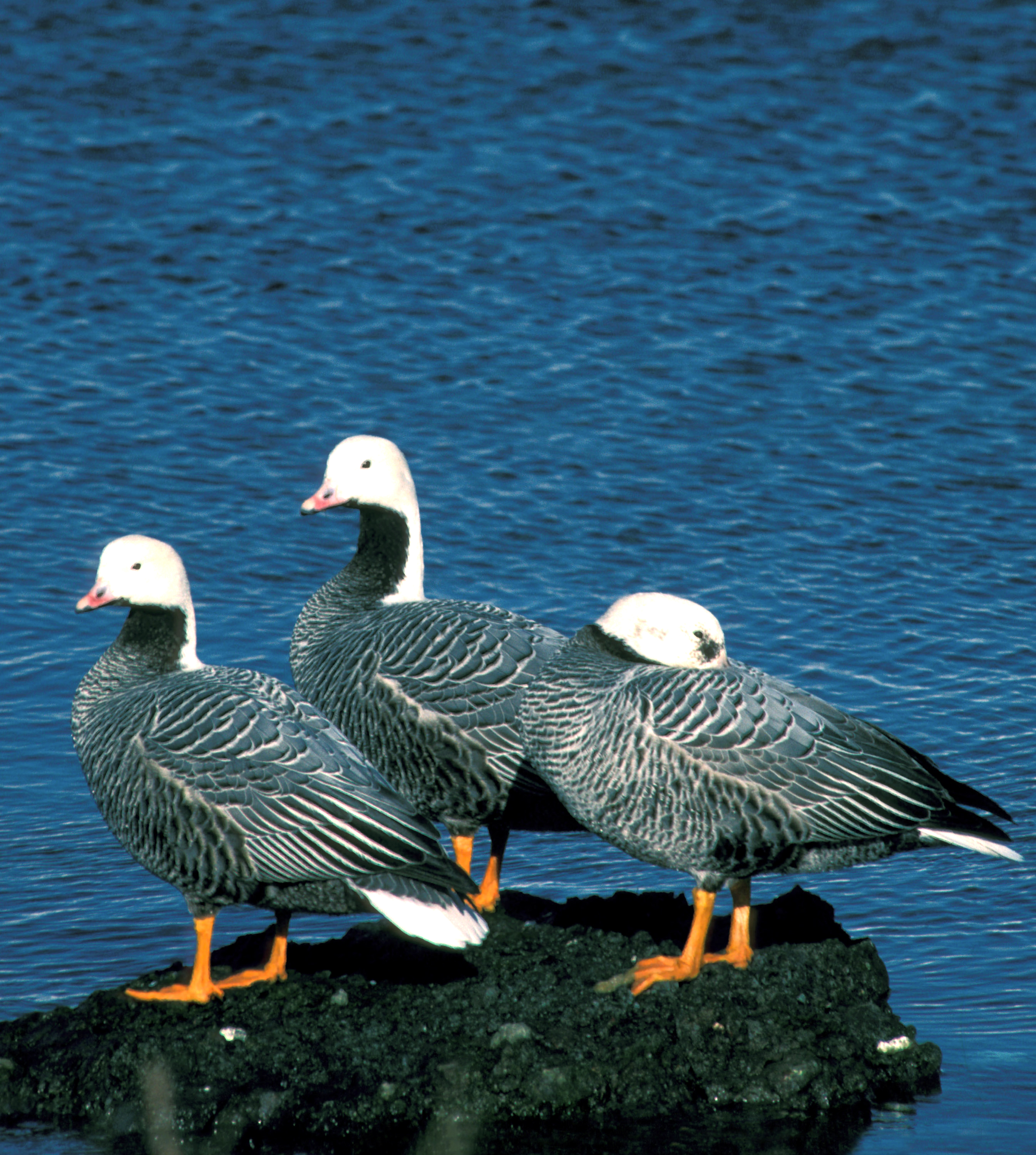
At Adak Island

During the summer, the emperor goose lives in Arctic and subarctic climates in the Bering Sea, around Alaska and a small part of northeast Russia. Its habitats in this season include freshwater pools, inland lakes, and coastal lagoons. 90% of specimens nest on the Yukon-Kuskokwim Delta. In the winter, after its southerly migration, it lives primarily among the Aleutian Islands, as well as on the Alaska Peninsula and the Kodiak Island. It sometimes spends winters in Canada and rarely as far south as northwestern California. Some areas in California the species has been found living in, as of 1918, include Humboldt Bay, Gridley, Davis, Rio Vista, Colusa County, Ingomar, Modesto, and Dixon. Its habitats are mudflats and rocky shores in the winter, in areas free of ice, and tundra wetlands in the summer. Its extent of occurrence is estimated to be 775,000 square kilometres (299,000 sq mi).

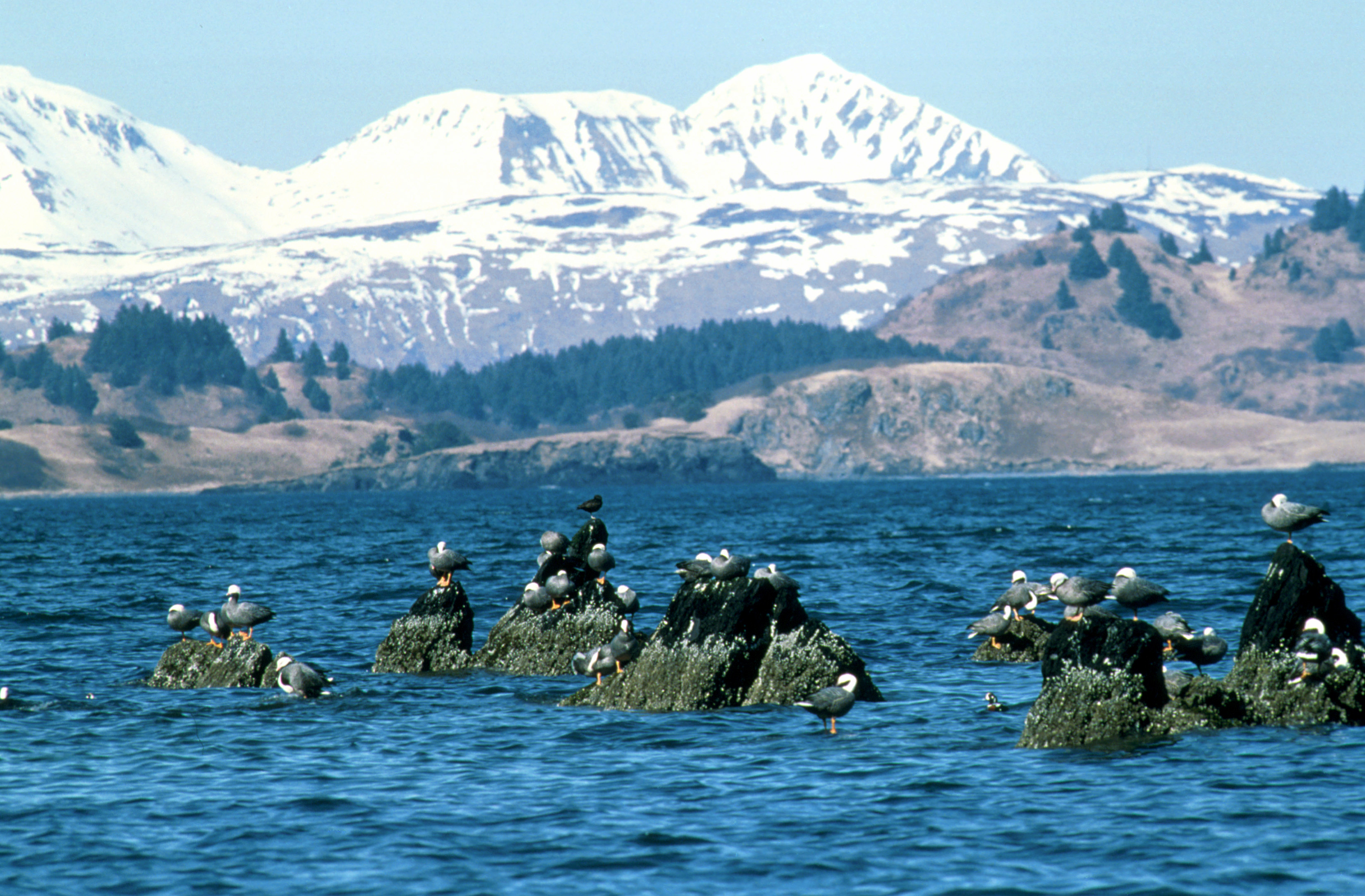
A flock in the Chiniak Bay, located in the Kodiak National Wildlife Refuge

== Conservation ==
As of August 2017, the emperor goose's population is increasing slowly. In 1879, the emperor goose was found by Edward William Nelson to be abundant along the Yukon-Kuskokwim Delta.

In 1923, however, Arthur Cleveland Bent observed much fewer specimens, and reported that the population had decreased over the past 30 years prior to that. Bent said that "large numbers are killed each year and their eggs taken by the natives, even within the limits of what is supposed to be a reservation", which was a major reason for the goose's decrease in population. In 1964, the goose's population was 139,000, which decreased to 42,000 in 1986.

The population subsequently increased, with its population having been 85,000 in 2002 and over 98,000 in 2015; According to the emperor goose's entry on the Red List of the International Union for Conservation of Nature (IUCN), which was entered on 1 October 2016, the total population of the emperor goose is decreasing.

However, it also said that the trend is not clear and it is increasing in parts of North America. Julian Fischer, a wildlife biologist, said in a news article published in August 2017, that the population has been experiencing a slow, steady increase.

He stated that the population had over doubled in size from the early 1980s, and that it may be as large as 170,000.

Although the reasons for the emperor goose's population decline are not well known, it is believed to be threatened by oil pollution, hunting, and climate change.

Other factors contributing to the species' population decline include competing with the cackling goose for food and the preying of goslings. The emperor goose is listed as near threatened on the IUCN Red List and rated 14 out of 20 on the Continental Concern Score. The 2016 State of North America's Birds' Watch List, a list of threatened birds that have no major conservation actions taking place for them, includes the emperor goose.

Due to its low population in the 1980s, recreational and subsistence hunts closed for the goose in 1986 and 1987, respectively. However, 30 years later, hunts became legal again after the population grew significantly. In 2015, the Alaska Migratory Bird Co-Management Council suggested for hunting of the bird to be allowed if the population were to grow to a certain number. On 2 April 2017, subsistence hunting was allowed for the emperor goose, with hunters able to kill an unlimited number of geese. In fall 2017, emperor geese were allowed to be hunted for recreational purposes by locals of Alaska with a permit, with a limit of one bird per person.

In 2018, hunters who were not residing in Alaska were permitted to hunt the geese with a permit. However, the species cannot be hunted anywhere in the contiguous United States.

When spring arrives, monogamous pairs select a place to build their next nest. Emps don't mate until they are at least three years old. According to the Alaska Department of Fish and Game, "90 percent of the world's population of emperor geese nest on the Yukon-Kuskokwim Delta." Based on only a few observations of this species, females conduct all the nest-building and incubation activities for their three to five eggs. Males guard the nest and the female from predators, including foxes, gulls, other geese, or humans. Emps prefer to nest in tall, dead grass along landscape features like water lines or on the top of a small rise. Their nests are made up of soft, dry vegetation and down feathers. Similarly to other geese, males, females, and their offspring feed together for the summer.
