= Nicholas Bock =

Father Nicholas Bock (Russian: Николай Иванович Бок), SJ (13 November 1880, Saint Petersburg, Russian Empire – 27 February 1962, New York City, United States) was a diplomat from the Russian Empire who later became a Catholic priest.

== Biography ==
Born in Saint Petersburg to diplomat Ivan Bock and Natalia Kossovich, Bock graduated Petrischule German school in 1899 and thereafter entered the law faculty of Saint Petersburg University. In 1903, he joined the Ministry of Foreign Affairs, and in 1912 was appointed secretary of the Russian diplomatic mission to the Vatican. From 1916 to 1917, he acted as chargé d'affaires of the mission. After the October Revolution, he remained in Italy as chairman of the Committee for Assistance to Russian refugees.

In 1924, Bock moved to Paris, engaging in small business there, and in 1925 adopted Catholicism, converting from Russian Orthodoxy. In 1931, he married and moved to Japan, teaching Russian, French and German in Takaoka. In 1943, Bock moved to the city of Kobe. In spring of 1945, his house was destroyed during a raid by U.S. aircraft; in the same year, his wife died, after which he went to the Jesuit Order. In 1948, at the age of 67 years, he was ordained as a priest.

Soon, he moved to the United States, living in California, where there were many Russian Catholics who had fled Harbin after Communists had come to power in China. In San Francisco, Bock founded the Byzantine Catholic parish of Our Lady of Fatima of the Russian Catholic Apostolate which follows Vladimir Solovyov as its basis. He was later transferred to the Russian center at Fordham University (Russian: Русский центр им. Владимира Соловьёва при Фортдамском университете) in New York City. In 1950, he took part in the Congress of the Russian Catholic clergy in Rome, where he was deputy chairman of the Archbishop Alexander Evreinov. Bock died on February 27, 1962, in New York and is buried at the Catholic monastery of Shruboak in New Jersey.

== Family ==
His brother, Boris Bock, who was a naval officer of the 1st Rank, was Pyotr Stolypin's son in law. Boris and his wife Maria Petrovna (died 1985) are buried in San Francisco in a Serbian cemetery, where many Russians are buried. Their grandson Nikolai Vladimirovich Sluchevsky (born 1948, San Francisco), who is the son of their daughter Ekaterina and Vladimir who is the grandson of the poet Konstantin Sluchevsky, is a fluent Russian speaker and active in business in Russia with his first job at the French commercial company Rémy Cointreau Group in Almaty in 1994 and later working with Boris Fyodorov at the investment fund UFG Assets Management which was obtained by Deutsche Bank in 2005. He is a director on the 2001 established Moscow-based Foundation for the Study of Stolypin's Legacy (Russian: Фонд изучения наследия Столыпина), which was founded and chaired by Pavel Anatolyevich Pozhigailo and is supported by academician Valentin Valentinovich Shelokhaev, and wrote a biography of his great-grandfather Pyotr Arkadyevich Stolypin after which he received recognition from Vladimir Putin who admires Stolypin.

== Bibliography ==
- Osmidnevnye spiritual exercises. - New York, 1953.
- Russia and the Vatican on the eve of the Revolution: Memoirs of a diplomat. - New York, 1962.
