= Saint Peter's School (Saint Petersburg) =

Secondary school in Russia

Coordinates: 59°56′14.60″N 30°19′27.12″E

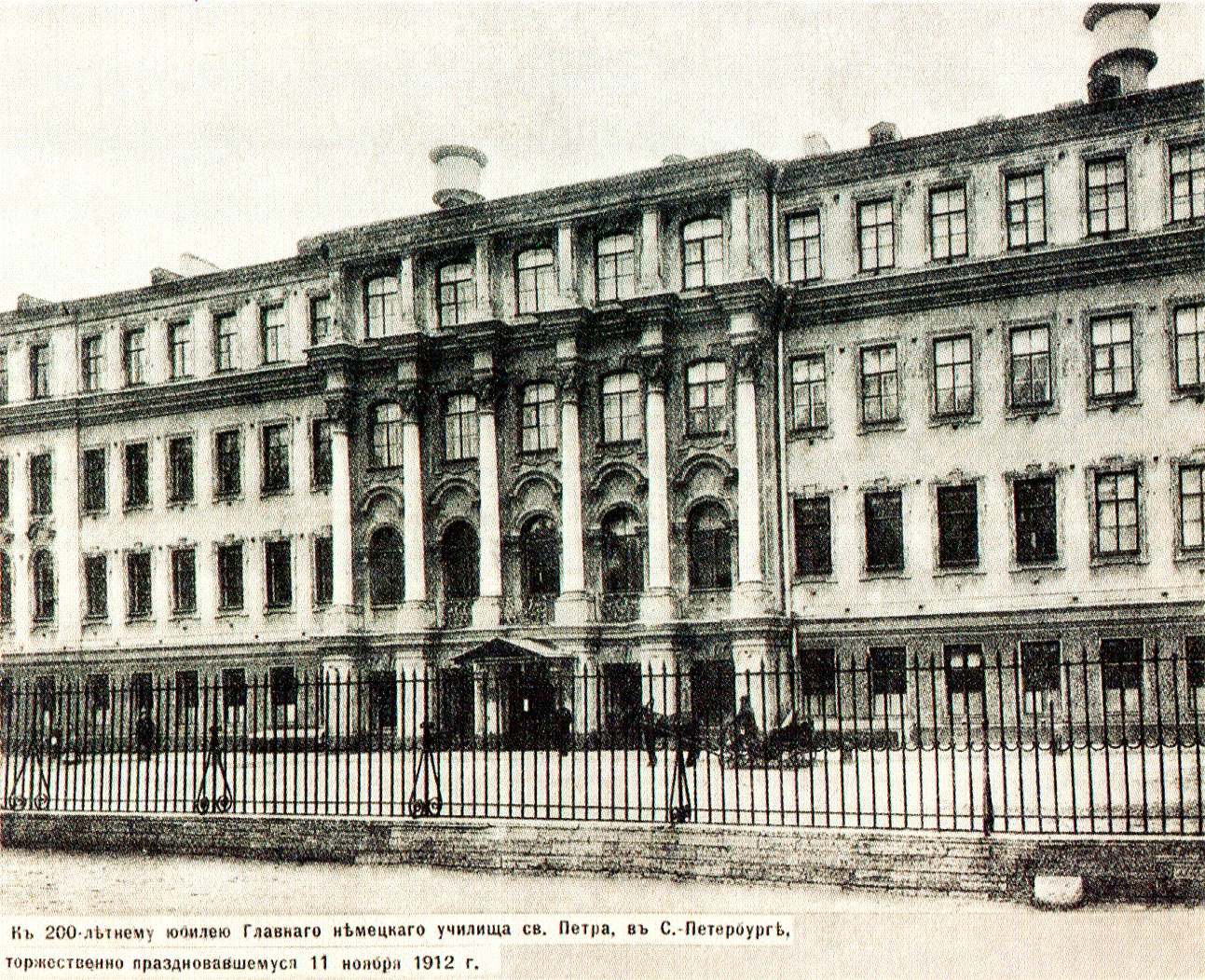
St. Peter's School in 1912

Saint Peter's School (Russian: Петришуле, German: Sankt-Petri-Schule), often referred to as Petrischule (the German transliteration of its Russian name) is a secondary school in St. Petersburg. It is one of the oldest educational institutions in Russia, having been founded in 1709.

== History ==
In 1705, Peter the Great decreed that Protestant churches could be established in St. Petersburg. The first reference to the school is in 1709, in a letter (now in the Archive of the Russian Navy) by Admiral Cornelius Cruys to the Emperor (Peter) regarding the establishment of a Lutheran church and school at his estate, located on the site of what is now the New Hermitage on Millionnaya Street in St. Petersburg's German settlement.

In 1761, the German theologian, geographer, historian, and teacher Anton Friedrich Büsching was invited by the Lutheran community of St. Petersburg to be headmaster of the school at the Lutheran Church of Saint Peter and Saint Paul. The current school building, at numbers 22-24 Nevsky Prospect, was built in the 1760s and rebuilt several times - in 1799, in 1876–1877, and in 1913–1915.

Among the educators who taught at the school are:

- The natural scientist Erik Laxmann (1737–1796).
- The philosopher and Latin scholar Alexander Galich (1783–1848), who was a teacher of Pushkin.
- The writer Ivan Born (1778–1851), compiler of the first Russian language textbook.
- The writer and poet Vasili Popugaev (1778 or 1779–1816 (probable)).
- The philologist and pedagogue Nikolai Gretsch (1787–1867).
- The mathematician Nikolai Brashman (1796–1866).
- The physicist Heinrich Lenz (1804–1865), discoverer of Lenz's Law.
- The phalerist (scholar of medals) Julius Iversen (1823–1900).
- The physicist Orest Khvolson (1852–1934).

== War and Revolution ==
In 1912, the school celebrated its 200th anniversary. By this time it had become the largest secondary school in Russia, with more than 1600 students, of whom 25% were Russian.

Then came the First World War. With the war came anti-German sentiment. The Imperial Ministry of Education decreed that all classes were to be taught in Russian, and that the school name was to be written in Russian. Teachers who were not fluent in Russian left, and gymnastics instructor Anton Preis, a German national, was expelled by the authorities. Anti-German sentiment led some families to withdraw their children from the school, while senior students left to join the Russian army. After 1918, the school bore the following names: United Soviet Labor School № 4, № 14, № 28, № 41, 222-I and 217-I Schools of the Kuibyshev district of Leningrad. In 1991 the school's historic name was restored.

== Famous former pupils ==
- Friedrich Konrad Beilstein, chemist and systematiser of organic chemistry
- Nicholas Bock, diplomat
- Ivan Bock, diplomat
- Otto von Böhtlingk, indologist
- Alexander Brückner, historian
- Maria Vorontsova, pediatric endocrinologist
- Daniil Charms, writer
- Georg Forster, naturalist, ethnologist
- Alexander Galich, philosopher
- Michail Gromov, mathematician
- Wilhelm Junker, explorer of Africa
- Peter Lesgaft, anatomist
- Gregor von Helmersen, geologist
- Carl Friedrich Keil, German Lutheran Old Testament commentator
- Woldemar Kernig, physician
- Elisabeth Kulmann, poet
- Friedrich Martens, diplomat and jurist
- Nikolai Menshutkin, chemist
- Maximilian von Messmacher, architect
- Modest Mussorgsky, composer
- Theodor Pleske, zoologist
- Yakov Rekhter, network protocol designer and software programmer
- Carlo Rossi, architect
- Lou Andreas-Salomé, writer
- Gennadiy Shatkov, boxer
- Friedrich von Schubert, military general and geodesist
- Victor Schröter, architect
- Katerina Tikhonova, scientist
- Konstantin Thon, architect
- Pavel Chichagov, military and naval commander
- Fedor Linde, Russian revolutionary sergeant and commissar

== Currently ==
As of the beginning of the 21st Century, the school had over 500 students and about 60 teachers. The German language is studied and there are international student exchanges.

== Sources ==
- Smirnov, V.V. (2006). St. Petrischule. The School on Nevsky Prospect behind the Kirche: the Oldest School in Saint Petersburg. 1709—2005 (in Russian). Saint Petersburg: Kolo. p. 152. ISBN 5-901841-27-1.
- Materials of the Commission of the People's Educational Institutions, 1780-1790. Central Government Historical Archive, Saint Petersburg. Collection #733. (in Russian)
- «Geschichte der St. Petri-Schule von 1862 bis 1887» dargestellt von E. Friesendorff (in German)
- Almanac: Germans in Russia - Germans of Saint Petersburg (in Russian). Saint Petersburg: Russian Academy of Sciences. 1999.
- The matter of awarding a decoration to Nikolay Ivanovich Grech, a teacher at the Petrischule, for honorable service and literary efforts, 1811. Central Government Historical Archive, Saint Petersburg. Collection #733, opus #20, document #122. (in Russian)
- Ulyanov, N.P. (1998). Almanac: Germans in Russia - the Lives of the Teachers of the Petrischule, 1920s and 1930s (in Russian). Saint Petersburg: Russian Academy of Sciences.
- Bulanin, Dmitry (1999). Almanac: Germans in Russia - Pastor A.F. Büsching and the Petrischule (in Russian). Saint Petersburg: Russian Academy of Sciences.
