= Medal ribbon =

Military decoration

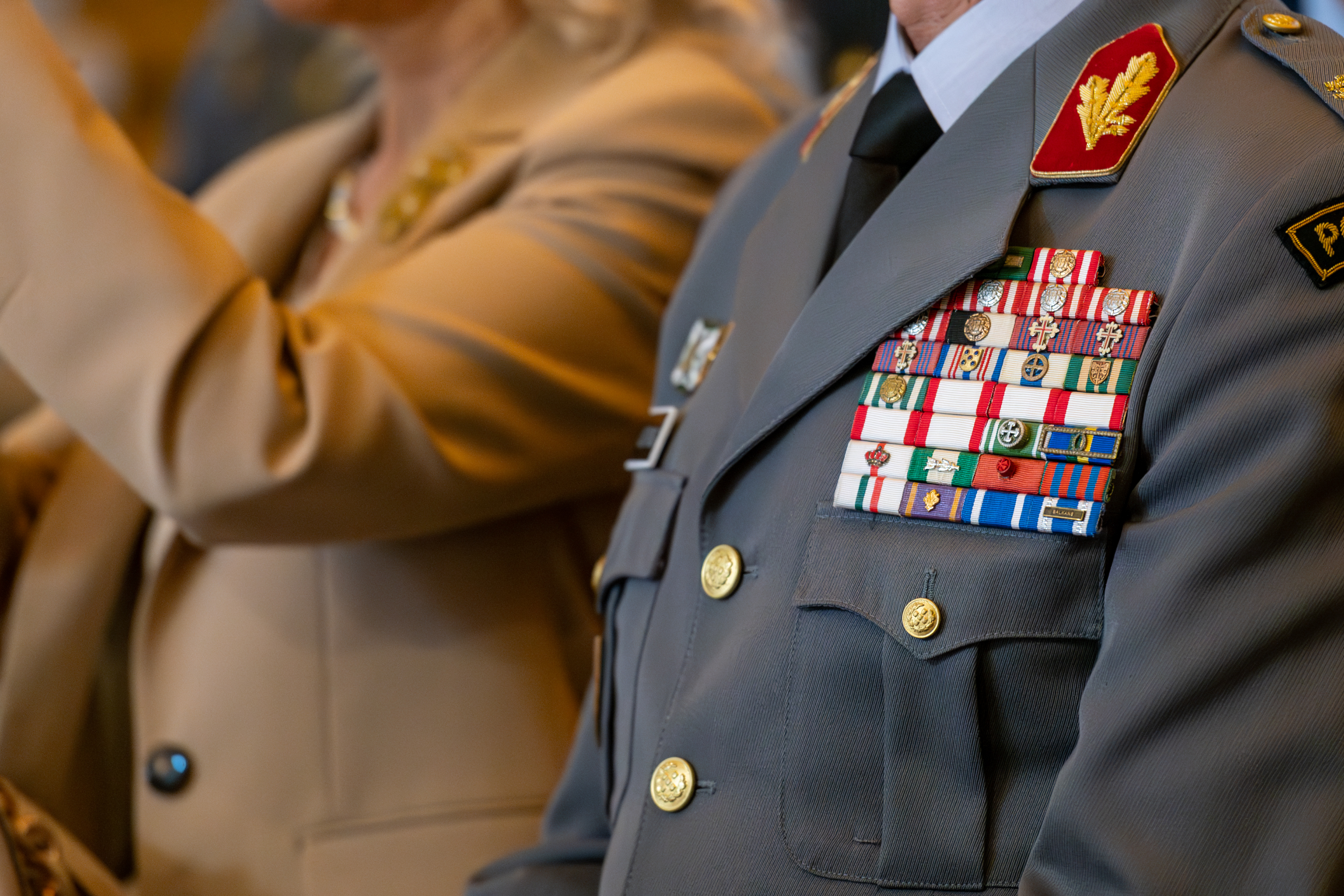
A Portuguese Army general wearing ribbon bars

A medal ribbon, service ribbon, or ribbon bar is a small ribbon, mounted on a small metal bar equipped with an attaching device, which is generally issued for wear in place of a medal when it is not appropriate to wear the actual medal.

Each country's government has its own rules on what ribbons can be worn in what circumstances and in which order. This is usually defined in an official document and is called "the order of precedence" or "the order of wearing". In some countries (particularly in North America and Israel), some awards are "ribbon only", having no associated medal.

== Design ==
According to the U.S. Defense Logistics Agency (DLA), the U.S. military's standard size for a ribbon bar is 1 3/8 inches (35 mm) wide, 3/8 inch (9.5 mm) tall, with a thickness of 0.8 mm.

The service ribbon for a specific medal is usually identical to the suspension ribbon on the medal. For example, the suspension and service ribbon for the U.S. government's Purple Heart medal is purple with a white vertical stripe at each end (see photo).

However, there are some military awards that do not have a suspension ribbon, but have an authorized ribbon and unit award emblem. The Soviet Order of Victory is a badge that was worn on the military parade uniform. However, a ribbon bar representing the Order of Victory was worn on a military field uniform.

=== Colors ===
Ribbon bars come in a variety of colors. In the case of the U.S. government, it maintains a specific list of colors used on its ribbons, based on the Pantone Matching System and Federal Standard 595 color systems:

Colors used on U.S. military ribbons
Name	Color	RGB value	Pantone MS value
Air Force Yellow		255,205,0	116
Apple Red		213,0,50	119
Army Green (Uniform)		40,71,52	553
Aspic Green		191,184,0	397
Black		0,0,0	5445
Blue HQ		183,201,211	289
Blue HX		12,35,64	3105
Blue Turquoise		104,210,223	542
Bluebird		123,175,212	542
Bottle Green		17,87,64	343
Brick Red		134,38,51	202
Brittany Blue		163,199,210	551
Bronze		139,111,78	874
Brown		96,61,32	161
Buff		185,151,91	465
Burnt Orange		227,82,5	166
Cannes Blue		123,175,212	542
Cardinal Red		186,12,47	200
Chamois		242,199,92	141
Cobalt Blue		0,32,91	281
Corsaire Blue		0,45,114	288
Crimson		165,0,80	220
Dark Blue		0,38,58	539
Eggshell		221,203,164	468
Emerald		100,167,11	369
Flag Blue		4,30,66	282
Flame Red		255,88,93	178
Forget-Me-Not Blue		154,219,232	304
Garnet		111,38,61	209
Gherkin Green		74,119,41	364
Gold		133,113,77	872
Gold Brown		184,97,37	471
Golden Orange		255,158,27	1375
Golden Yellow		255,205,0	116
Goldenlight		255,198,88	135
Graphite Blue		0,38,58	539
Grebe Gray		84,88,90	425
Green		33,87,50	357
Grotto Blue		0,193,213	3115
Imperial Blue		0,61,165	293
Imperial Purple		152,29,151	254
Irish Green		0,132,61	348
Ivory		255,255,255	
Jasmine		253,210,110	134
Khaki		176,170,126	452
Lemon Yellow		251,221,64	114
Light Blue		91,127,149	5415
Light Green		146,172,160	5575
MC Antique White		233,223,151	461
Mahogany		127,48,53	491
Marine Corps Scarlet		228,0,43	185
Maroon		87,41,50	504
Midnight Blue		0,38,58	593
Mintleaf		164,214,94	367
Mosstone Green		122,154,1	377
Myrtle Green		0,122,51	356
Natural		202,199,167	454
Navy Blue #1		4,30,66	282
Navy Blue #2		4,30,66	282
Nugget Gold		255,209,0	109
Old Blue		162,170,173	429
Old China Blue		123,175,212	542
Old Glory Blue		1,33,105	280
Old Glory Red		186,12,47	200
Old Gold		132,117,78	871
Olive		78,91,49	574
Olive Drab		105,91,36	455
Orange		252,76,2	1655
Oriental Blue		0,114,206	285
Oriole Orange		229,114,0	152
Ostende Blue		123,175,212	542
Paprica		250,70,22	172
Parrot Blue		136,219,223	318
Peacock Blue		0,146,188	313
Primitive Green		0,154,68	347
Prophet Green		67,176,42	361
Purple		95,37,159	267
Putty		178,168,162	407
Rally Red		111,38,61	209
River Blue		0,111,98	562
Scarlet		186,12,47	200
Silver Gray		158,162,162	422
Smoke		84,88,90	425
Soldier Red		111,38,61	209
Spicebrown		115,56,29	168
Spring Green		197,232,108	374
Spruce Green		0,76,69	3302
Star Yellow		253,218,36	115
Steel		124,135,142	430
Tarragon Green		137,144,100	5773
Teal Blue		0,62,81	3035
Terra Cotta		150,56,33	174
Toast		155,90,26	154
Ultramarine Blue		0,20,137	Reflex Blue
Victory Medal Blue #1		0,75,135	301
Victory Medal Blue #2		0,75,135	301
White		255,255,255	
Yale Blue		0,114,206	285
Yellow		255,199,44	123

== Construction ==
There is a variety of constructions of service ribbons. In some countries, service ribbons are mounted on a "pin backing", which can be pushed through the fabric of a uniform and secured, with fasteners, on the inside edge. These ribbons can be individually secured and then lined up, or they can be all mounted on to a single fastener. After the Second World War, it was common for all ribbons to be mounted on a single metal bar and worn in a manner similar to a brooch. Other methods of wearing have included physically sewing each service ribbon onto the uniform garments.

== Display ==
"Orders of wearing" define which ribbons may be worn on which types of uniform in which positions under which circumstances. For example, miniature medals on dinner dress, full medals on parade dress, ribbons on dress shirts, but no decorations on combat dress and working clothing. Some countries (such as Cuba) maintain a standard practice of wearing full service ribbons on combat utility clothing. Others strictly prohibit this. These regulations are generally similar to the regulations regarding display of rank insignia and regulations regarding saluting of more senior ranks. The reasoning for such regulations is to prevent these displays from enabling opposing forces to easily identify persons of higher rank and therefore aid them in choosing targets which will have a larger impact on the battlefield. In times of war, it is not uncommon for commanders and other high value individuals to wear no markings on their uniforms and wear clothing and insignia of a lower ranking soldier.

Service medals and ribbons are generally worn in rows on the left side of the chest. In certain commemorative or memorial circumstances, a relative may wear the medals or ribbons of a dead relative on the right side of the chest. Medals and ribbons not specifically mentioned in the "Order of wear" are also generally worn on the right side of the chest. Sequencing of the ribbons depends on each country's regulations. In the United States, for example, those with the highest status—typically awarded for heroism or distinguished service—are placed at the top of the display, while foreign decorations (when allowed) are last in the bottom rows. When medals are worn (typically on the left side of a shirt or jacket), ribbons with no corresponding medals are worn on the right side.

== Collecting ==
The study, history and collection of ribbons, among other military decorations, is known as phaleristics (sometimes spelled faleristics by users of U.S. English).

== Notable examples ==
=== Australia ===
- Keith Payne, VC, OAM

- His Excellency General The Honourable Sir Peter Cosgrove, AK, MC

=== Canada ===
- Romeo Dallaire (1994)

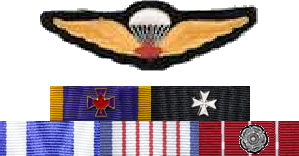

=== Denmark ===
- Sir Hans Jesper Helsø former General and Chief of Defence.

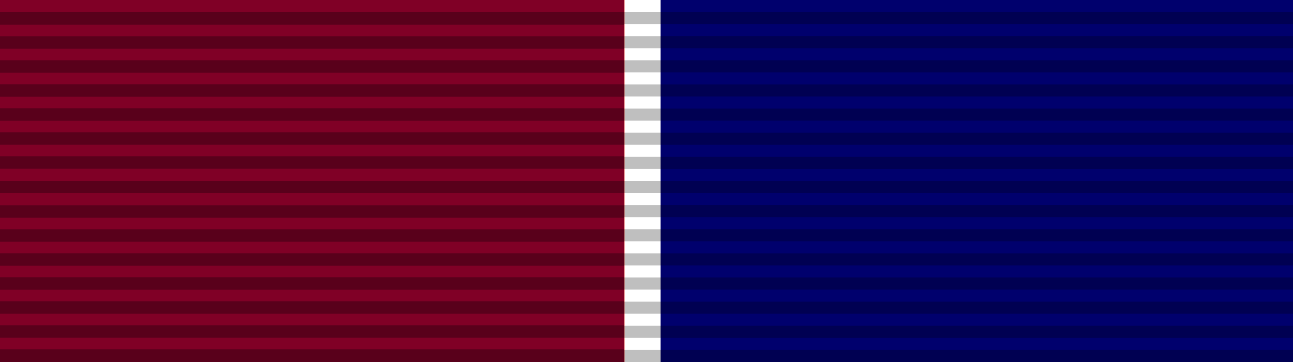
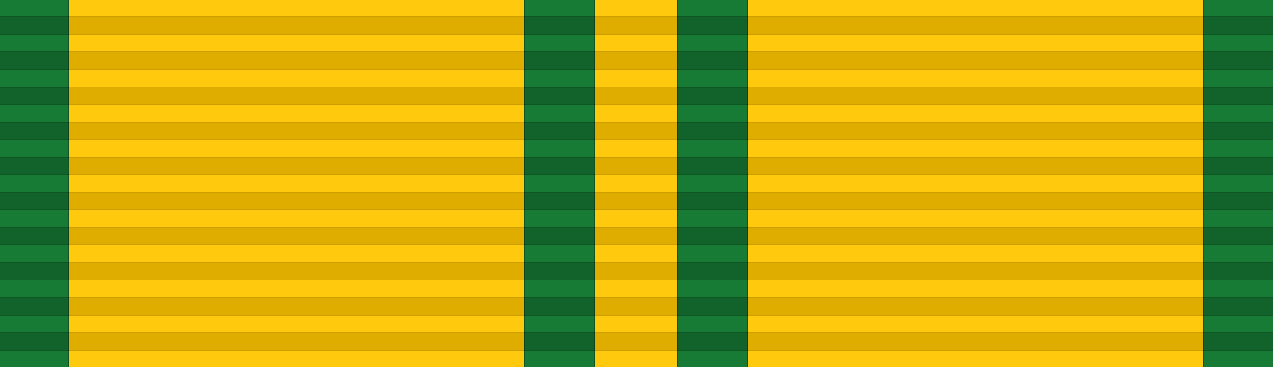

=== Ecuador ===
- Ecuadorian General of the Army Paco Moncayo

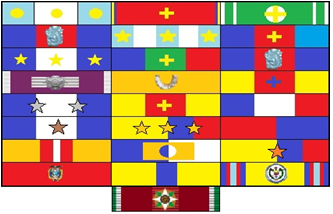

=== Germany ===
- Generalfeldmarschall Wilhelm Keitel

=== India ===
- Field Marshal S.H.F.J. Manekshaw

=== United Kingdom ===
Admiral of the Fleet Louis Mountbatten, 1st Earl Mountbatten of Burma (incomplete)

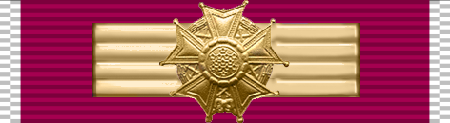

=== United States ===
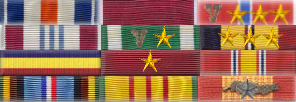
Commander Richard Marcinko's ribbon rack worn in the standard U.S. Navy style, rows of three with no spacing or staggering.

In the U.S. military, the different federal uniformed services have different methods of wearing ribbon bars on uniforms. In the U.S. Navy, they are worn in rows of three with no staggering or spacing between rows (with the exception of the top row, which may be staggered to the wearer's left if covered by a lapel). For U.S. Navy members who have three or more ribbons, they can elect to wear only their three highest-ranked ones instead of all of them and if their top three ribbons are obscured by a lapel, they can stagger the top row. In the U.S. Marine Corps, they can be worn in rows of three or four, with optional staggering and can be spaced between rows. In the U.S. Army, they can be worn staggered with spacing in between rows. A U.S. serviceman's complete ribbon display is known by a variety of nicknames. It can be referred to colloquially as a "ribbon rack" or "rack" for short, or a "fruit salad".

General George S. Patton's ribbon bars

== See also ==
- Awards and decorations of the United States military
- List of military decorations
- Order
- Phaleristics
