= Ivan Born =

Russian writer

Ivan Martynovich Born (Russian: Иван Мартынович Борн, German: Johann Georg Born) (1778 - 1851) was a Russian writer, translator, and educator.

== Life ==
Born was born on 20 September 1778 in Wesenberg. He was educated from 1794 in the gymnasium of the St. Petersburg Academy of Sciences. After leaving school he worked as a proofreader in a printing company and as a private tutor.

In 1801, Born formed, with Nikolai Grech and Vasili Popugaev, a literary society which 1803 was officially recognized and chartered as the Free Society of Lovers of Literature, Science, and the Arts. The Society produced various literary works, including the two-part anthology Scroll of the Muses and the St. Petersburg Gazette. Born took a very active part in these endeavors, contributing articles and poems.

In 1803 Born became an instructor, then a senior instructor of the Russian language, at the Petrischule, a prestigious German-language secondary school in St. Petersburg. From 1803 to 1805 he was chairman of the Born Society, which gathered in his apartments in the Petrischule building. He taught there until 1809.

In 1808 Born published his main work, A Brief Guide to Russian Literature, with contributions by Alexander Vostokov. One of the first textbooks of the Russian language, it contained grammar, concise rules of rhetoric, and the history of Russian literature.

In 1809 Born was engaged as the Russian language tutor to Prince Georgy Petrovich Oldenburgsky. Upon the prince's early death in 1812, Born became personal secretary to his widow, the Grand Duchess Catherine Pavlovna, and mentor to their children. After Catherine's second marriage, to Crown Prince Wilhelm of Württemberg, Born followed her to Germany, living in Stuttgart and later in Oldenburg. Born died on 13 September 1851 in Stuttgart and is buried there.
