= Free Society of Lovers of Literature, Science, and the Arts =

Russian literary and political society

The Free Society of Lovers of Literature, Science, and the Arts (Russian: Вольное общество любителей словесности, наук и художеств) was a Russian literary and political society active in the early 19th Century.

The precursor to the Society was founded by a group of secondary school graduates from the gymnasium of the Imperial Academy of Sciences in St. Petersburg on July 15, 1801.

The founders included Ivan Born, Vasili Popugaev, Vasili Krasovsky, Alexei Volkov, Mikhail Mikhailov, and Vasili Dmitriev. The original name chosen by the group was "Friendly Society of Afficianados of Elegance", but this was soon changed.

According to Nikolai Grech, the founders of the Society "were prepared for a strenuous and exacting study of literature". Born, Popugaev, and the others were to demonstrate the erudition obtained from their studies of science and the humanities at the gymnasium. All the members were fluent in French, and some in German, English, and Italian.

Dmitriev worked in the field of astronomy, Volkov later in chemistry, and Krasovsky in physics and mineralogy; Popugaev was also learned in science.

In 1802 the membership of the Society grew considerably with the addition of the poets Alexander Vostokov, Ivan Pnin, Gavril Kamenev, Alexander Izmailov, Nikolai Ostolopov, and the sons of Alexander Radishchev, Nicholas and Vasili.

In 1802 and 1803 the Society published the first part of its two-part anthology Scroll of the Muses.

On November 26, 1803, the Society was officially recognized and its charter approved.

In 1804 the Society started a magazine, The Review, which only published one issue.

In 1807 D. I. Jazyko, representing the conservative wing of the Society, replaced Born as president.

In 1811, membership fees were abolished and some other changes in the Society's rules were made.

With the French invasion of Russia in 1812, the Society temporarily suspended operations. Meetings were resumed in 1816 under the chairmanship of A. E. Izmailov and continued until 1826. In this third phase of the Society's existence, the Society saw the influx of a large number of new members which had a major impact on its direction. These included Fyodor Glinka, Anton Delvig, Wilhelm Küchelbecker, Yevgeny Baratynsky, Orest Somov, Alexei Martos, and Kondraty Ryleyev.

== See also ==
- Vasili Popugaev
