= Julius Iversen =

Russian phalerist (scholar of medals)

Julius Gottlieb Iversen (Russian: Юлий Богданович Иверсен, romanized: Julij Bogdanovič Iversen; 5 April [O.S. 24 March] 1823 in Reval – 13 April [O.S. 1] 1900 in St. Petersburg) was a Russian phalerist (scholar of medals).

Iversen, of Baltic German ethnicity, was born in Reval on April 5, 1823. He studied at Imperial University of Dorpat from 1842 to 1846. In 1850 he received the title of Candidate of Philosophy (equivalent to a modern Western Ph.D.) and in that same year arrived in St. Petersburg.

Iversen taught ancient languages in Anglican and Reformed Church schools from 1851 to 1885. From 1855 to 1880 he taught Greek and Latin at the Petrischule, a prominent Lutheran school which mostly served St. Petersburg's German community.

In 1879 Iversen was appointed senior keeper of the parlor of mintage at the Hermitage Museum.

Iversen's first published work was Article on Russian Medallions which appeared in the Petrischule Programme for 1870. His other works include:

- Medals bestowed by Catherine II to certain individuals in the Don Army (1870)
- Medals of Peter the Great (1872)
- Dictionary of Medal Recipients and Other Persons whose Names are Found on Russian Medals (1874)
- Medals in Honor of Russian Government Officials and Private Individuals (1878–1883)
- Medals Created During the Reign of Alexander II (1880)

Iversen also published a series of articles in various issues of Archaeology, articles on medals in the Berliner Blätter, and articles in the Proceedings of the Imperial Russian Archaeological Society and the proceedings of archaeological congresses.

== Sources ==
- "Иверсен, Юлий-Готлиб" . Brockhaus and Efron Encyclopedic Dictionary (in Russian). 1906.
