= Gavriil Kamenev =

Russian poet

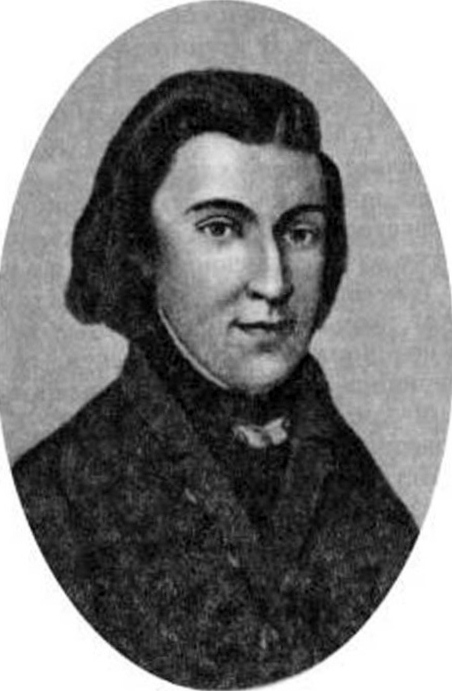
- Born: 3 February 1772; Kazan, Russia
- Died: 25 July 1803 (aged 31); Kazan, Russia

Gavriil Petrovich Kamenev (Russian: Гаврии́л Петро́вич Ка́менев, IPA: [ɡəvrʲɪˈil pʲɪˈtrovʲɪtɕ ˈkamʲɪnʲɪf]; 1772–1803) was a Russian poet, writer, and translator.

Kamenev was born on 3 February 1772 in Kazan and lived there in adverse circumstances (he was not good at business and was unhappily married), his only bright moments being brief visits to Moscow. He had attended a boarding school, but was essentially self-educated.

Kamenev published poems in The Pleasant and Agreeable Pastime, Muse, Ipokrene, Literary News and especially in the publications of the Free Society of Lovers of Literature, Science, and the Arts. In the latter he published his ballad "Gromval", marking the first appearance of the Romantic strain in Russian literature. In "Gromval", Kamenev used the then-unusual anapaest and dactyl poetic feet.

Kamenev translated several of August von Kotzebue's works into Russian, wrote about his impressions of Moscow, and was acquainted with Nikolay Karamzin and other famous writers. Kamenev's significance as the first Russian Romantic writer was acknowledged by Pushkin.

Kamenev died on 25 or 26 July 1803 in Kazan.

== Sources ==
- Русские писатели. 1800 — 1917. Биографический словарь. [Biographical Dictionary of Russian Writers 1800 - 1917] (in Russian). Vol. 2 (G - K). Moscow: Great Russian Encyclopedia. 1992. pp. 449–450. (in Russian)
