= Orest Somov =

Russian writer (1793–1833)

Orest Mikhailovich Somov (Russian: Орест Михайлович Сомов; 21 December [O.S. 10 December] 1793 – 8 June [O.S. 27 May] 1833) was a Russian romantic writer.

He studied at Kharkiv University, where he became an admirer of Romantic literature and Gothic fiction.

In 1817 he moved to Saint Petersburg where he continued his literary career. In addition to being a writer and translator, he established himself as a critic, editor and publisher, thus becoming one of the first professional men of letters in the Russian Empire. Somov was drawn to the folklore of his native Ukraine and much of his writing refers to Ukrainian history and folklore.

Somov was a popular writer during his lifetime. His works on Ukrainian themes made a big impact on the literary canon of the 1820s. His literary works were widely read and his critical opinion was highly regarded. After his death, although Orest Somov's works were included in anthologies of 19th-century Russian literature, he was forgotten by the general public. Only in 1984 that Orest Somov returned to the Russian reader. The publishing house "Soviet Russia" has published a collection of works by Orest Somov: Byli i nebylitsy. The compiler of the collection: Nina Petrunina. She is the author of the introductory article to the book: "Orest Somov and his prose."

In 1989 Yuriy Vynnychuk translated several of Somov's works into Ukrainian and included them in collection Ukrainian Gothic prose.

He is distantly related to the American actor René Auberjonois; Auberjonois' maternal grandfather's mother was a Russian noblewoman, Eudoxia Michailovna Somova (1850–1924), a collateral cousin of Somov's.

== Famous works ==
- 1825-1830 – Haidamaka
- 1827 — God’s Fool (Yurodivyi)
- 1827 — Order from the other World (Prikaz s toho sveta)
- 1829 — Kikimora
- 1829 — Rusalka
- 1829 — The Werewolf (Oboroten)
- 1830 — Tales of Buried Treasures (Skazki o kladakh)
- 1830 — Strange Duel (Strannyi poedinok)
- 1830 — Self-murderer (Samoubiytsa)
- 1831 — Kupalo Eve (Kupalov vecher)
- 1832 — Wandering Light (Brodiashchiy ohon)
- 1833 — The Witches of Kyiv (Kievskie vedmy)
- 1833 — The Evil Eye (Nedobryi glaz)
- 1833 — Mommy and Sonny (Matushka i synok)

== English translations ==
- Mommy and Sonny (story), from Proffer, Carl R. (1979). Russian Romantic Prose: An Anthology : Containing Tales by Alexander Pushkin, Nikolai Gogol, Orest Somov, Vladimir Odoevsky, Alexander Veltman, Mikhail Lermontov, Count Vladimir Sollogub, Alexander Bestuzhev-Marlinsky. Translation Press. ISBN 978-0-931556-00-5.
- Tales of Buried Treasures, The Werewolf and The Witches of Kyiv were included in Russian 19th Century Gothic Tales: Anthology, Raduga Publishers, 1984.
- The Witches of Kyiv, Rusalka, The Evil Eye, Wandering Light, Kupalo Eve and God’s Fool comprise Somov, Orest (2016-08-30). The Witches of Kyiv and Other Gothic Tales: Selected Works of Orest Somov. Sova Books Pty, Limited. ISBN 978-0-9945334-0-1.
