= Alexander Galich (philosopher) =

Alexander Ivanovich Galich (Russian: Александр Иванович Галич; 1783–1848) was a Russian teacher, philosopher, and writer.

Galich was a teacher of Latin and Russian literature at the German Saint Peter's School (Petrischule) in St. Petersburg, a professor at St. Petersburg University, a teacher of Alexander Pushkin, and a writer and philosopher who was one of the first followers of the German philosopher Friedrich Wilhelm Joseph Schelling in Russia.

== Life ==
Galich was born as Alexander Ivanovich Govorov in 1783 into the family of a deacon in Trubchevsk in Bryansk Oblast. From 1793 to 1803 he studied at Sevsk Theological Seminary. He then entered the St. Petersburg Teacher's Seminary, which in 1804 was renamed to Main Pedagogical Institute. Here he changed his surname to "Galich" (before that he had once changed it to "Nikiforov").

In 1808, he went to study at the University of Helmstedt and the University of Göttingen in Germany. In 1813, he defended his thesis at the Department of Philosophy of the St. Petersburg State Pedagogical Institute.

From 1814 to 1818 Galich taught at the Petrischule, the Tsarskoe Selo Lyceum, and the Main Teacher's College. In 1819, the Main Teacher's College was reorganized as St. Petersburg University, and Galich was the first member of the Faculty of Philosophy.

From 1818 to 1819, Galich published A History of Philosophical Systems in two volumes, compiled on the basis of German works by Sacher, Ast, Tenneman, and other German philosophers, and ending with an essay on the philosophical exposition of Schelling.

Shortly thereafter, charges were instituted against Galich and three other professors of impiety and revolutionary designs. In 1837, Galich, accused of freethinking, was laid off from St. Petersburg University. However, in the same year, he obtained a position in the Department of Archives.

In spite of his career problems, Galich continued to write and publish. His Encyclopedia of Philosophy (1845) was one of Russia's first philosophical reference works.

Most significant and broad in scope were two of his later works: Universal Rights and the Philosophy of Human History. However, ill fortune did not abandon Galich: as soon as he had completed these works, they were destroyed in an accidental fire. Unable to survive this loss, Galich became ill and died in 1848.
