= Phaleristics =

Study of awards

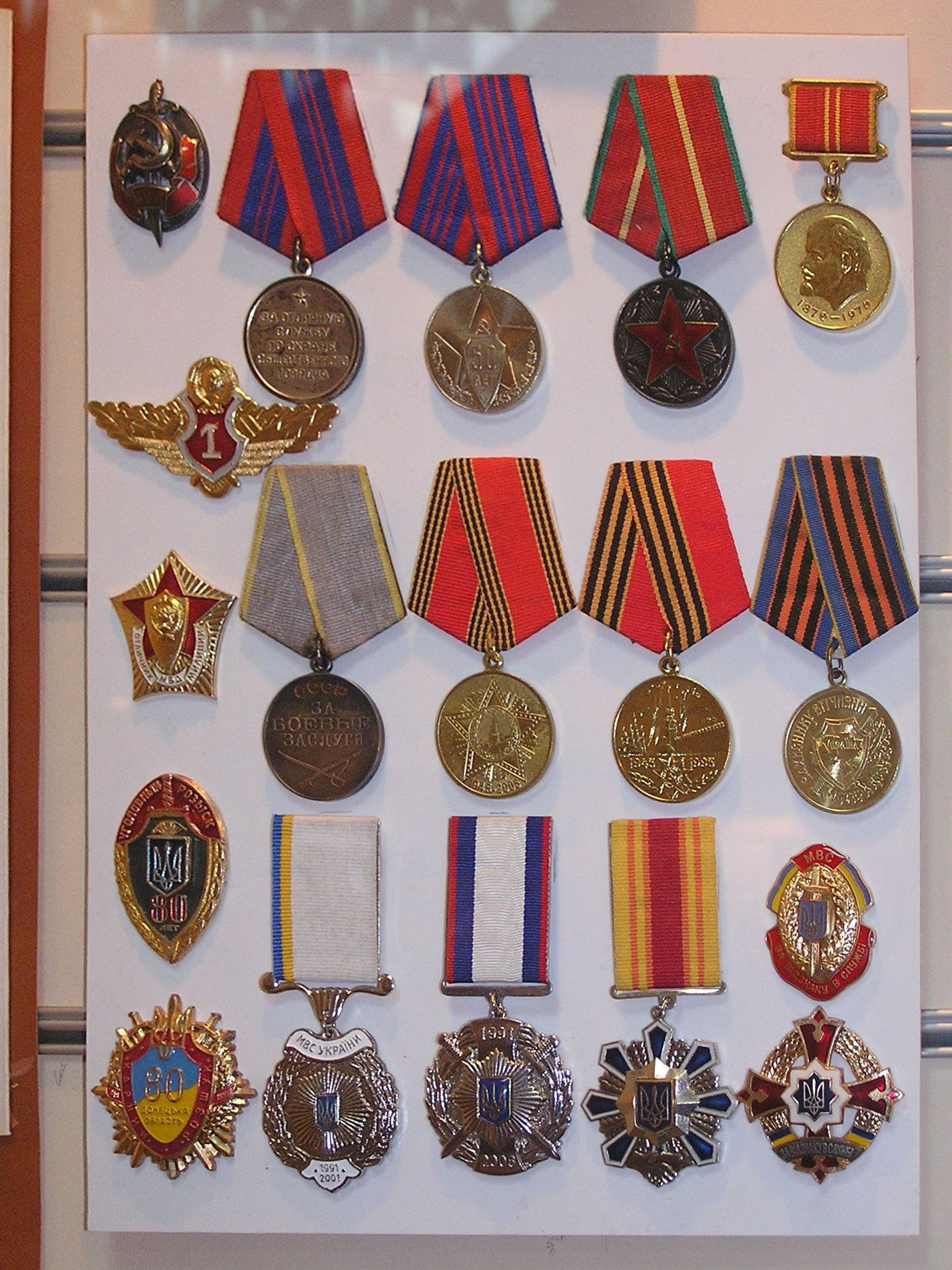
Soviet and Ukrainian medals from the Historical Museum of the Donetsk police

Phaleristics, from the Greek mythological hero Phalerus (Greek: Φάληρος, Phaleros) via the Latin phalera ('heroics'), sometimes spelled faleristics, is an auxiliary science of history and numismatics which studies orders, fraternities, and award items, such as medals, ribbons, and other decorations.

== Definition ==
The subject includes orders of chivalry (including military orders), orders of merit, and fraternal orders. These may all in turn be official, national, state entities, or civil, religious, or academic-related ones. The field of study also comprises comparative honour systems, and thus in a broader sense also history (art history), sociology, and anthropology.

In terms of objects, these include award items such as medals and their accessories, ribbon bars, badges, pins, award certificate documentation, etc., and phaleristics may also designate the field of collecting related items. Although established as a scientific sub-discipline of history, phaleristics usually studies orders and decorations "detached from their bodies".

== Notable phalerists ==
King George VI loved the study of phaleristics, going to the extent of personally overseeing his uniform designs and ribbon placements. He is known to have designed a few British military decorations for the Royal Navy; he also designed the ribbons of each WWII campaign star and the Defence Medal. The Russian phalerist Julius Iversen studied orders and medals in the 19th century.
