= Bureau of Censorship =

Russian Empire government body

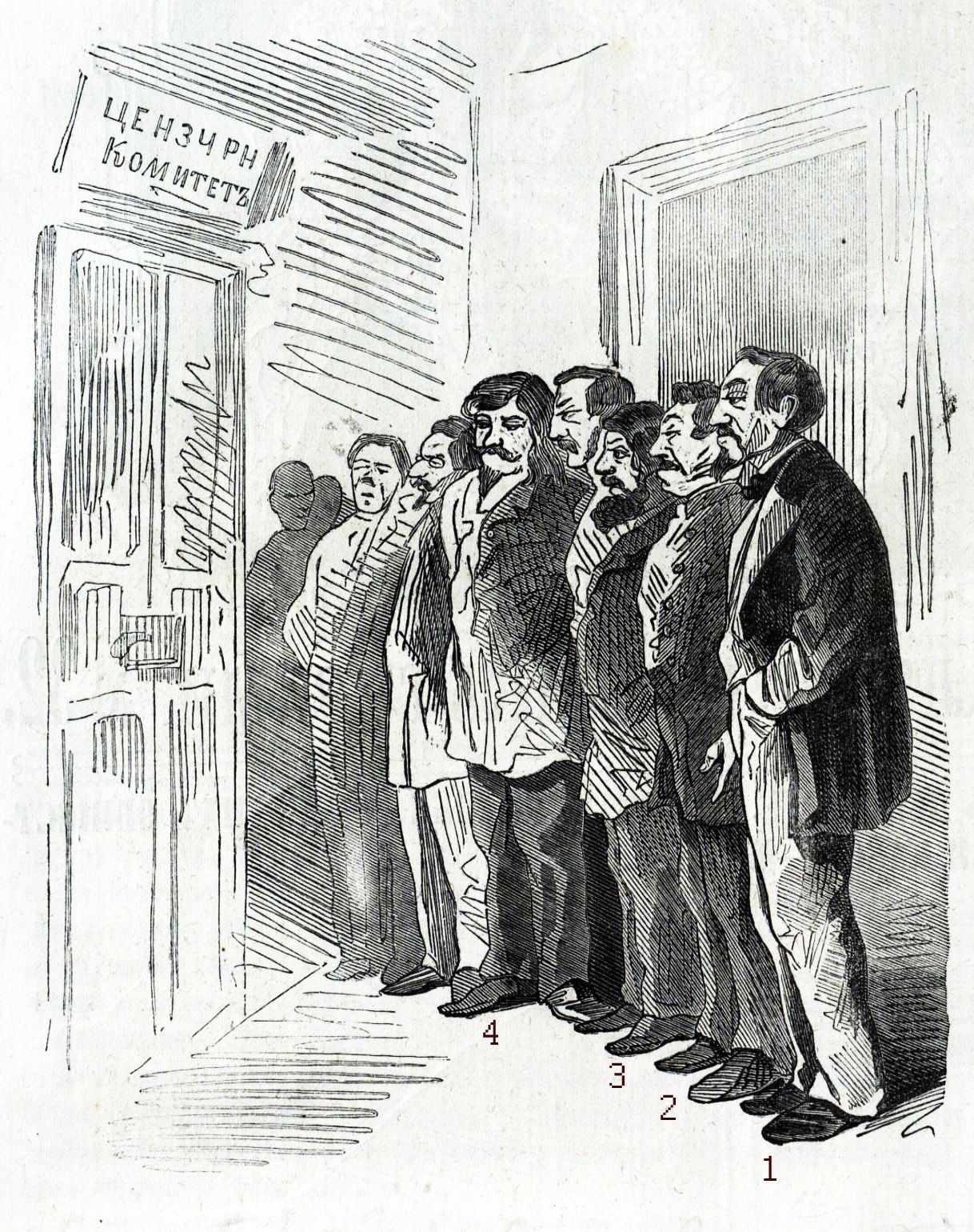
Magazine editors-in-chief (Nikolay Nekrasov, Vasily Kurochkin, Stepan Gromeka, Mikhail Dostoyevsky and others) stand in line to defend their rights before the Bureau of Censorship. Caricature in "Iskra" satirical magazine. 1862

The Bureau of Censorship (Russian: Цензурный комитет) was a bureau set up in the Ministry of Education of the Russian Empire following the passage of an enabling law on July 9, 1804.

The censorship statute read, in part:

1. The Censor has the duty to consider all manner of books and literary works intended for public consumption.
2. The primary object of this consideration is to bring to the public books and literary works works that contribute to true education of the mind and the formation of manners, and to remove books and other literary works of ill intent.
3. To this end, no book or literary work shall be printed in the Russian Empire except after the review by the Censor.

— Censorship Statute, July 9, 1804

The central committee of censorship was the St. Petersburg Censorship Committee, which reported directly to the trustees of the St. Petersburg school district. Censorship committees were also established in Moscow, Vilnius, and Tartu, and later in other districts.

The Ministry of Education's Bureau of Censorship, in addition to censoring certain material, reported the authors to the Third Section of His Imperial Majesty's Own Chancellery – "Section Three", the secret police, who monitored potential subversives. (Section Three also had the power to censor authors and writings even if they had been approved by the Bureau of Censorship.)
