= Yegoryevsky Uyezd =

Yegoryevsky Uyezd (Его́рьевский уе́зд) was one of the subdivisions of the Ryazan Governorate of the Russian Empire. It was situated in the northwestern part of the governorate. Its administrative centre was Yegoryevsk.

== Demographics ==
At the time of the Russian Empire Census of 1897, Yegoryevsky Uyezd had a population of 153,299. Of these, 99.3% spoke Russian, 0.4% Ukrainian, 0.1% Yiddish and 0.1% Polish as their native language.
