= Russian Enlightenment =

18th-century period of arts and sciences in Russia

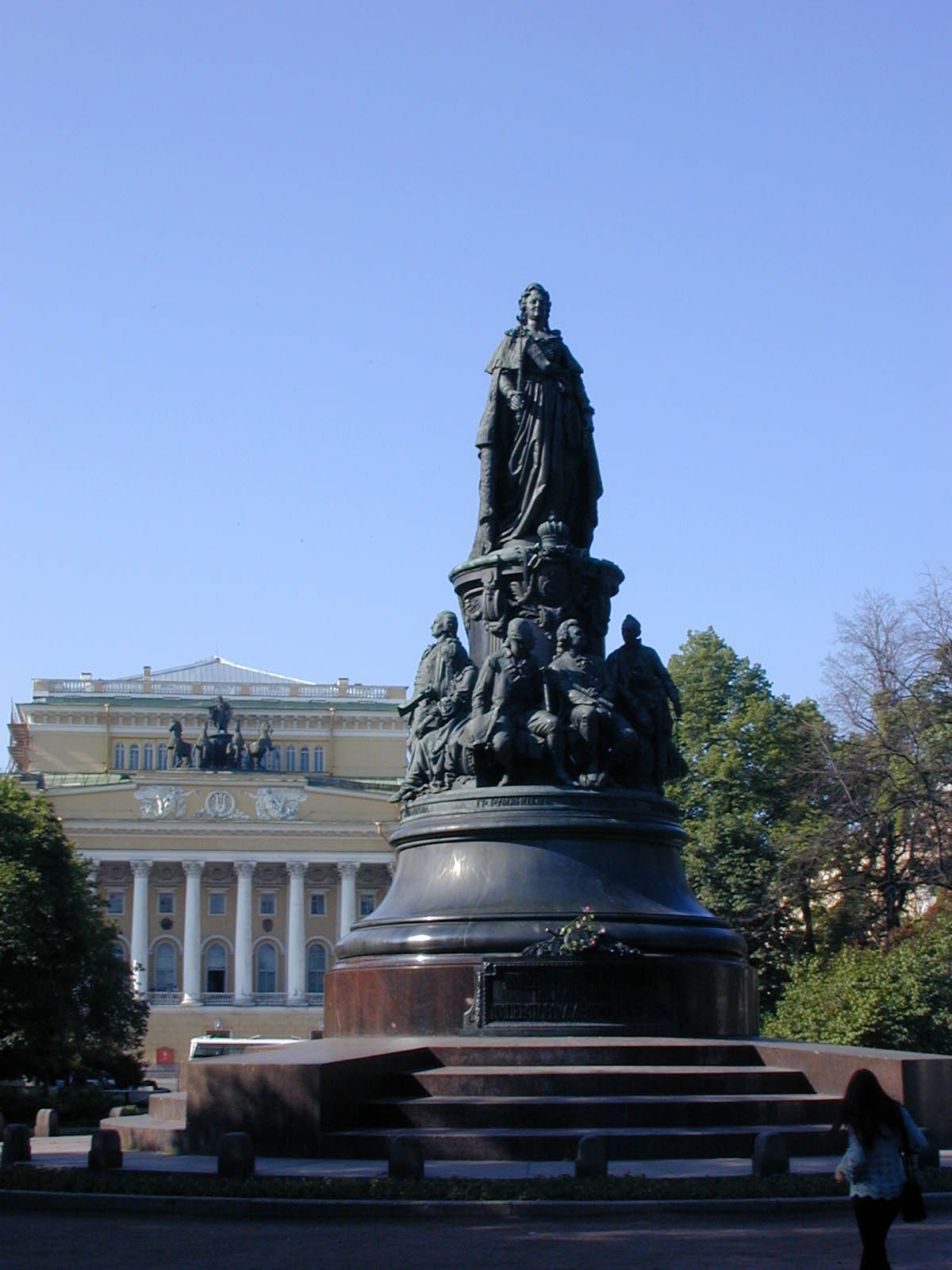
Mikeshin's Monument to Catherine the Great after the Alexandrine Theatre in St. Petersburg

The Russian Enlightenment (Russian: российское Просвещение) refers to the intellectual and cultural movement that flourished in the Russian Empire as part of the broader Enlightenment, during a period of the 18th century in which the government began to actively encourage the proliferation of arts and sciences, which had a profound impact on Russian culture. During this time, the first Russian university was founded, a library, a theatre, a public museum, as well as a relatively independent press. Like other enlightened despots, Catherine the Great played a key role in fostering the arts, sciences, and education. The Russian Enlightenment differed from its Western European counterpart in that it promoted further modernization of all aspects of Russian life and was concerned with abolishing the institution of serfdom in Russia. The Russian Enlightenment did not promote the separation of church and state. Pugachev's Rebellion and the French Revolution may have shattered the illusions of rapid political change, but the intellectual climate in Russia was altered irrevocably. Russia's place in the world was debated by Denis Fonvizin, Mikhail Shcherbatov, Andrey Bolotov, Alexander Radishchev, and Ivan Boltin; these discussions precipitated the divide between the radical, western, conservative and Slavophile traditions of Russian thought. Intellectuals often used the term prosveshcheniye ('enlightenment; education'), promoting piety, erudition, and commitment to the spread of learning.

== Early developments ==
The ideas of the Russian Enlightenment were first espoused by the "learned druzhina" of Peter the Great. It is the spirit which animates the sermons of Feofan Prokopovich, the satires of Antiokh Kantemir, and the historiography of Vasily Tatishchev.

During the reign of Peter's daughter Elizaveta Petrovna the ideas of the Enlightened Absolutism found their way into Russia. Elizaveta's favourite, Ivan Shuvalov, was an ideal enlightened courtier: he was instrumental in the establishment of the Moscow University and the Imperial Academy of Arts, which would start the careers of most intellectuals active during the last quarter of the 18th century.

Shuvalov was also the patron of the greatest Russian polymath, Mikhail Lomonosov, who left his mark in various branches of science, religious philosophy, poetry, and fine arts.

== Catherine the Great ==
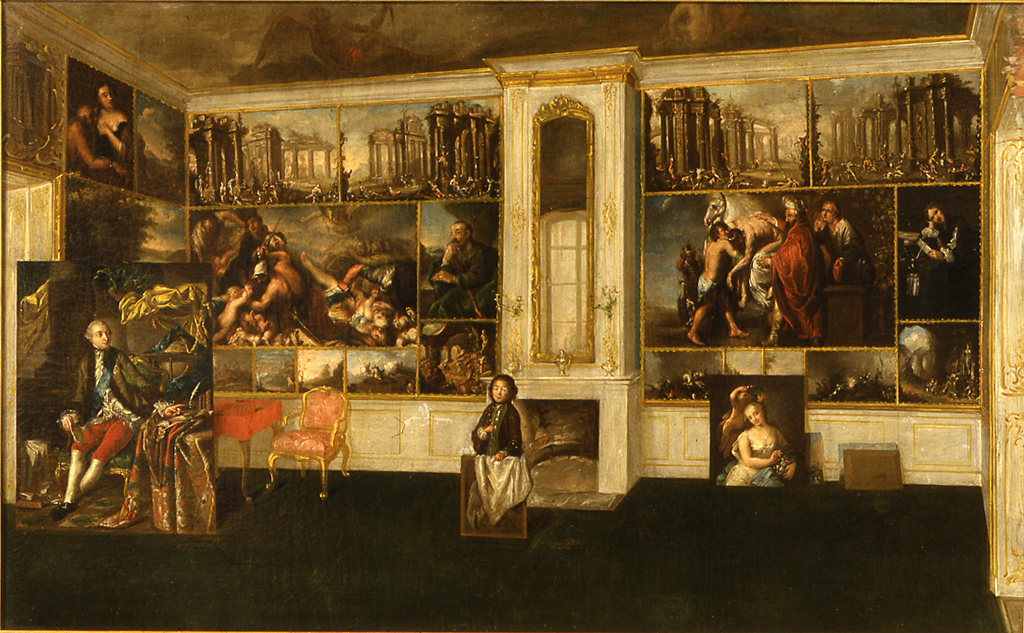
View of Ivan Shuvalov's art gallery

Catherine the Great considered herself an enlightened despot. She read the most prominent philosophes of the day, including Montesquieu and Voltaire and tried to adhere to Enlightenment ideas. She wished to bring Russia up to par with its neighbors not only in a military sense, but also politically, culturally, and intellectually.

Many of Catherine's contemporaries questioned her adherence to Enlightenment ideals and thought she was an egoist, merely using concepts from the Age of Enlightenment to further her selfish gains. Gender played a primary role in these criticisms. Contemporaries interpreted her personality as combining masculine strength with feminine vanity.

"Westernization" carries different meanings in different countries over varying time periods. But in relation to Russia during the 18th century, the term meant legislative changes to economics, politics and culture. It also entails the Russian gentry's adherence to a set standard and its imitation of the Western values. Westernization in Russia included the modernization of machinery, the refinement of a more efficient bureaucracy, and the acceptance of Western European tastes.

Russia produced more goods, and enlisted thousands of troops during Catherine's reign. While she acquired new lands, including Crimea and Poland, updated the army, and supported burgeoning manufactures, she really wanted to westernize Russia by reforming it, specifically the lives of the gentry, qualitatively. Bringing Russia to an equal level with the rest of Europe intellectually was a major concern of Catherine's. For this reason she created laws that justified her rule.

=== Foreign policy ===
Almost every Russian ruler has sought to conquer ports in warm waters. Peter I fought the Ottoman Empire over the Crimea. Gaining access to the Crimea would have given Russia access to the Black Sea and the Dardanelles. While Russia occupied Poland, France realized that the Ottoman Empire was the only country in a position to topple Catherine. Supported by France, the Turks told Russia to leave Poland. Russia declared war on the Sultan immediately afterward. After several successful victories including the destruction of the Turkish naval fleet, Catherine impressed many European powers: "Catherine, who had at first been treated as a dilettante in politics, now appeared to all the Western chanceries as an evil genius."

Catherine returned to the Crimea in November 1776, and imposed a ruler for the reoccupation of the peninsula because of disturbances there. The Crimeans revolted in 1778, after which the Russians went in the same year and installed their own leader to the throne.

Because she gained significant diplomatic power in the early 1770s Catherine considered something called the "Greek Project". This consisted of pushing the Turks out of Europe, but it also carried another more utopian aspect: reclaiming Constantinople from Muslim to Orthodox Christian rule. The Second Turkish War, 1787–1792, ended with Russia gaining the fortress of Ochakov and the Black Sea shore to the Dniester river, and the Ottoman Empire recognizing Russia's annexation of Crimea.

Retaking Constantinople and creating a Christian empire centered there does not appear to be a very enlightened plan. However, Catherine saw land grabbing as an easy way to assert Russia's intentions. By declaring that Constantinople would one day belong to Christians, she also appeased the Church, which still held significant influence in the 18th century. She wished to show Western Europe that her country would be a powerful presence in European political matters. Catherine's partition of Poland was an even more blatant example of power politics. Russia invaded three separate times, in 1772, 1793, and 1795, and divided the once important European state between itself, Austria and Prussia. The 3rd May Constitution of the Polish–Lithuanian Commonwealth voted in 1791 was considered by Catherine as a Jacobin threat and as a therefore presenting a threat to Russia's monarchy and its influence in Poland, which ultimately led to a military expedition resulting in the destruction of the Polish–Lithuanian Commonwealth.

Catherine's land acquisitions show the quantitative changes she made to the Russian Empire. But she went far beyond this type of modernization that Peter the Great used in Russia. The institution of laws and importation of liberal Western European thought served as means of expanding the state.

=== Politics ===
At the advice of her learned correspondents, Catherine introduced a number of changes, ranging from the vast secularization of monastic properties to the domestic reform which envisioned more rational planning for the Russian towns.

Catherine believed in Enlightenment political thought. She reformed the strong and powerful bureaucracy Peter the Great established. She established fifty "gubernii" provinces, divided into ten districts. 300,000 to 400,000 people lived in each province and 20,000 to 30,000 lived in every district. A governor, and a network of officials, divided by executive, legislative, and judicial functions were ideally supposed to run each province. Catherine also wanted the gentry to play a role in local political affairs.

Catherine's political reforms went beyond perfecting Russia's bureaucracy. Her Nakaz or "Instruction" expressed her political ideals. She wrote this for her Legislative Commission, summoned in 1767 to draft a Code of Laws for Russia. Representatives from all the free estates of the realm, government bodies, and non-Russian people considered the state of Russia's laws. Several of her advisers suggested putting in place a council to regulate legislation but this was promptly rejected. Once Catherine began to lose the slightest amount of power she reverted to the ways of the past: autocratic rule. She ruled through a series of functional colleges headed by boards under presidents, who worked in cooperation with an appointed administrative Senate of 20 or 30 people. The Senate possessed no legislative powers. Catherine kept the power to pass laws.

She realized the need for the establishment of laws. Some argue that Catherine used the Enlightenment as a way of placing "her rule on firm philosophic foundations and providing a national guide for the moral leadership of Europe." Others say she used her laws for purely practical reasons. She established a civil law code in January 1774 and a criminal code during the second half of the 1770s but never finished a unitary code. She drew heavily in the Nakaz from the latest continental jurisprudence but ignored references to natural law.

Criticism of the Empress's reforms abounded. Professor Semyon Desnitsky, a follower of Adam Smith, suggested that Catherine institute elections every five years of a representative Senate and separation of powers. Mikhail Kheraskov used novels and poems to show that the duty of the autocrat was to transition from an enlightened absolute monarch to a constitutional or limited monarch.

To understand the significance of Catherine's rule, one must look back on Peter the Great's reign. Peter established the idea of a "reforming tsar." He broke away from the old Muscovite conception of the Russian sovereign as "good tsar." From his reign on all tsars were judged by the standard of: modernizing economics, society, politics and cultural life, gaining influence abroad, and leading Russia on secular Western European ideas. No longer did leaders paternalistically protect the Russian homeland.

Russia became a major European power because of Peter's reforms. From Peter's rule set the precedent for succeeding leaders. For the next 150 years, Russian rulers followed "reform conservatism" which consisted of maintaining the state's power, fighting off fundamental change, but also adopting progressive changes that gave the autocracy a feature of liberalism, which was actually conservative in practice.

=== Culture ===
Considered the "only articulate ideologist to rule Russia between Ivan IV and Lenin", Catherine not only wanted to have military and political equality with Western European countries but she also strove to emulate their enlightened rule by supplanting western thought and practices onto the Russian gentry. Catherine did this because of universal standards Europeans used to compare themselves.

In contrast to Peter I, who regulated Russian society through public ceremony and legislation, Catherine promoted "the internal mechanisms of behavior regulation." She attempted to achieve this remarkable goal through education. Russia set up state-run schools that provided students with learning in the three Rs, as well as about behavior proper for citizenship. The schools stressed two principles above all else: the need to be patriotic, and the need to accept innovation.

The upper classes' increased purchasing power caused them to see themselves as equals to the French, British, Swiss, Danish and Swedes. This led the gentry, viewed as the "pillar of absolutism and of the Russian state," to "domesticate—in the most literal sense of the word—the appointments of Western European polite society."

Catherine called the gentry, in her Nakaz as "an Appellation of Honour, which distinguishes all those who are adorned with it from every other Person of Inferior Rank." In 1785, she fused the notion of reward for service with the idea of inherited rank in "Declaration of the Rights, Freedom and Privileges of the Well-Born Russian Nobility": "The right to the name of dvoryanin (gentry) comes down from the quality and virtue of those men who took the lead in ancient times and distinguished themselves by particular service." She codified this by ordering assemblies of the gentry in regional centers to keep genealogical records. Catherine's reforms allowed those with historically powerful families to keep their status in society, and others to rise due to service. A nobleman no longer showed his refinement through his servitude to the court but through what he owned and what company he kept.

Catherine's Smol'nyi Institute in St. Petersburg, based on the French Maison royale de Saint Louis, taught upper-class girls polite manners in society and gave them a moral education. Girls studied not only "dance, music, sewing, drawing, and household economy" but also "law, mathematics, languages, geography, history, economy, architecture, science, and ethics."

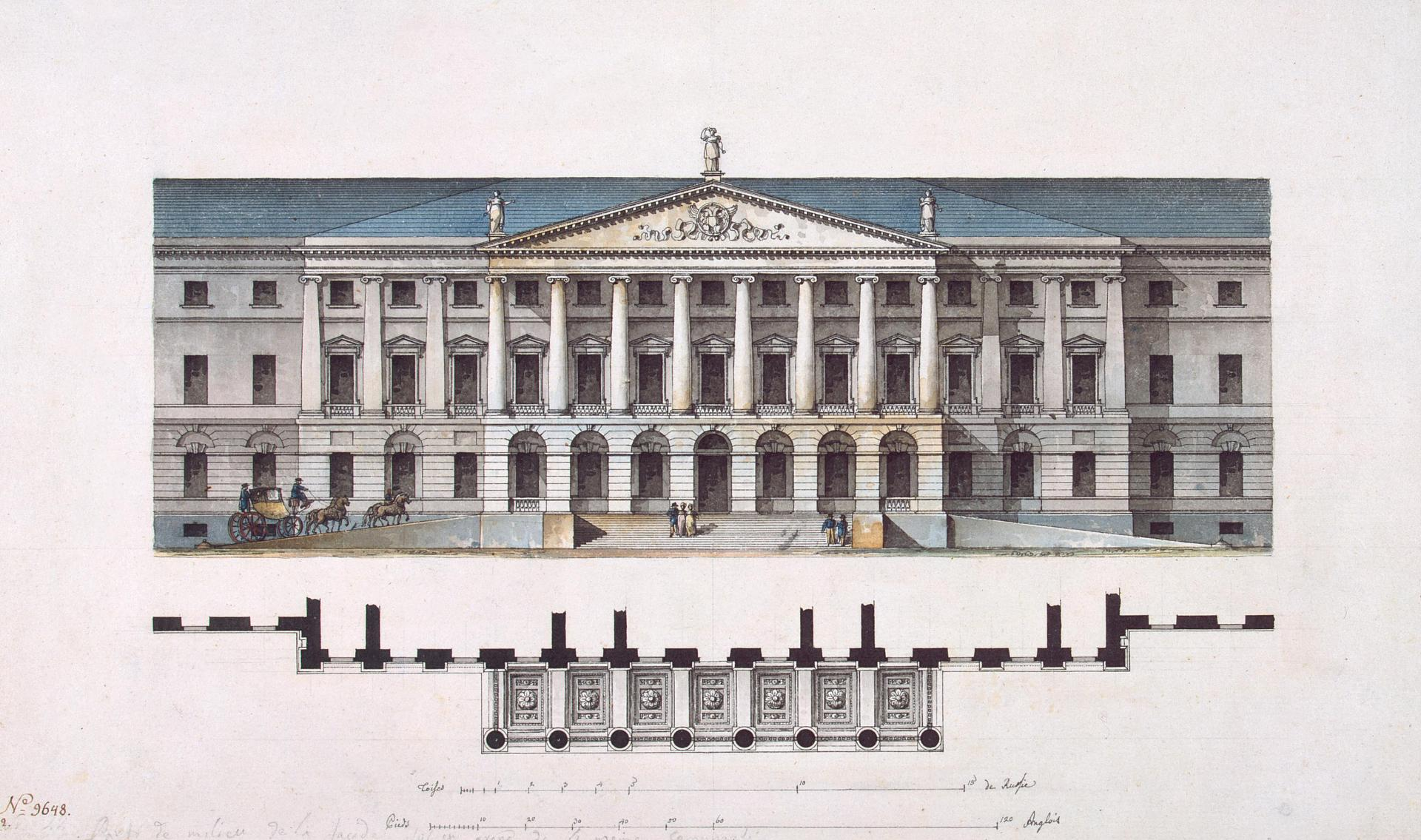
Quarenghi's design for the Smolny Institute

Her Sub-Commission on Education concerned itself not with the subtleties of sciences, but with primary, secondary, and higher education. The idea was to teach children the duties required of those who live in society. The Sub-Commission began its work in May 1768 and used English universities, the Prussian system of national education and "Irish school" as models. The state then established free, co-educational high schools and primary schools in provincial towns in 1786. By 1764, district towns received primary schools however; rural schools did not come into existence. Few children attended public schools. Around 176,000 children passed through Russian public school between 1786 and 1796. Russia lacked the finances and teachers to run schools properly.

Secularization, a "western" principle, officially came to Russia through monetary necessity. Of course Enlightenment ideas about religion influenced the gentry but Catherine established the Commission on Church Lands on February 6, 1764 to support the finances of the state. The appropriation of Church lands to the state brought a substantial amount of money, land, and peasants under Catherine's control.

=== Economics ===
The state's efforts to "westernize" Russia's gentry greatly affected their economic circumstances. The wealthiest classes gained more income in order to afford education and western habits. The gentry consisted of a fairly impoverished majority and small extremely wealthy minority. The lower gentry farmed and lived slightly better than the few serfs they had. In 1777, 59 percent of the gentry owned less than twenty serfs. The lives of serfs and peasants remained relatively the same during Catherine's reign. In 1762 the peasantry was divided into three groups: private serfs, Church peasants, and state peasants. Consisting of 56 percent of the peasantry, private serfs were bound to their villages because of tax purposes and military conscription. Their masters had a legal responsibility to feed them in time of famine, care for them in old age, and pay their poll-tax.

The upper classes of Russia put more money into manufacturing, which grew during Catherine's reign. The number of enterprises increased from 600 to 700 in 1762 to over 2,000 when her reign ended. Russian agriculture grew during Catherine's reign due to the economic pressure put upon the gentry that needed more wealth in order to indulge in Western European tastes. The gentry used potentially arable land in old areas as well as new land on the peripheries of the empire. This expansion occurred during the 1780s and 90s.

Throughout Catherine's reign she tried to find a balance between liberal political economic ideas in the tradition of Adam Smith, and the strong regulation started by Peter I. She preferred hired labor in industry, lowered internal tariffs and custom duties, and did not support monopolies. Catherine forbade the purchase of serfs for industry.

Mining was a source of Russian wealth. Catherine invited German mineralogy expert Franz Ludwig von Cancrin to Russia and put him in charge of a major salt mine at Staraya. Cancrin's son Georg von Cancrin joined him later in Russia, where he rose to the post of Minister of Finance.

In the 1762, the Church owned two-thirds of ploughed land. After Catherine's reform, secularized Church land brought the state "an annual income of 1,370,000 rubles, of which less than 463,000 was returned to the Church each year between 1764 and 1768."

=== Catherine and Voltaire ===
Catherine first initiated the relationship between herself and Voltaire, and she went to very great lengths to make his acquaintance. In the autumn of 1763, Catherine arranged for her Genevan secretary François-Pierre Pictet, an acquaintance of Voltaire, to send Voltaire a letter (supposedly written by Catherine herself) in which Pictet praised her at great length. Catherine made many other attempts to link herself to the French philosophes: she offered to publish the Encyclopédie in Russia, arranged for several of Voltaire's plays to be produced at the Court of St. Petersburg, asked for copies of his complete works, and invited him to come to Russia. Her flattery eventually won over Voltaire, and they began writing letters to each other in the autumn of 1763, continuing to do so until Voltaire's death fifteen years later.

A relationship with Voltaire benefited Catherine for several reasons. Firstly, Catherine felt the need to strengthen her claim to power, having only recently taken the throne from her husband in a coup d'état. Since the philosophes significantly shaped public opinion in Western Europe, Catherine wanted desperately to gain Voltaire's approval. She used him to spread support of her policies throughout Western Europe. Voltaire also interested Catherine on an intellectual level, as they shared a common interest in politics, philosophy, and literature. Her correspondence with Voltaire provided an outlet for her intellectual curiosity.

Voltaire likewise benefited from Catherine's friendship. Long an admirer of enlightened despotism, Voltaire approved of Catherine's secular policies. He thought that his correspondence with Catherine would help him explore the possibilities for enlightened despotism and allow him to compare the laws and customs of Russia with those of France. By 1763, Voltaire had long been interested in Russia on an intellectual level, having written in 1759 the Histoire de l'Empire de Russie sous Pierre le Grand. Furthermore, because Voltaire was persecuted in Europe for his ideas and even exiled from Paris, he appreciated the Russian Empress's flattery and recognition of his talents and progressive thinking.

Voltaire played an important role in promoting Catherine's image in Europe. He has been described as Catherine's "most distinguished western partisan, her most enthusiastic devotee, and her most indefatigable and eloquent propagandist." In addition to singing her praises among his circles of friends, Voltaire wrote pamphlets that supported Catherine's policies and had her pronouncements and letters published in the western press, particularly targeting anti-Russian publications such as the Gazette de France, the Gazette de Cologne, and the Courrier d'Avignon. Voltaire even succeeded in convincing the French historian Claude-Carloman de Rulhière not to publish his Histoire ou anecdotes sur la révolution de Russie en l'année 1762, which provided a disparaging account of Catherine's rise to power.

Voltaire as propagandist

A foreign-born woman and usurper of the Russian throne, Catherine the Great held no legitimate claim to the crown. Her sole connection with the house of Romanov derived from her marriage to the late Emperor, Peter III, whose murder she was widely known to have orchestrated. The royals who held genealogical claims to the throne overtly devised plots to replace the new Tsarina. Both Ivan VI and Paul I, armed with supporters, threatened Catherine's rule, as well as the guards who possessed the military might to overthrow the Empress. In a letter to Voltaire on September 21, 1762, Catherine acknowledged the conspirators and potential traitors all around her: "Every guardsman when he looks at me can say: 'I made that woman.'" A shrewd politician, Catherina also knew she needed the support of the Court, the public, and other powerful regimes in order to maintain power, suppress rebellion, and emerge as a leading world power.

Catherine's letters to Voltaire often served as a means to woo the influential philosopher to her cause. Rather than pursue intellectual subjects, Catherine utilized her letters to flatter and cajole the philosopher. While Voltaire often attempted to initiate the Empress in an intellectual dialogue, Catherine often sidestepped his inquiries. For example, "Voltaire did try to start a discussion…in the case of the [Claude Adrien] Helvetius translation by Golitsuin. In response to Voltaire's comments…Catherine blithely agrees…but confesses she has not read the book yet,". One has the impression that Voltaire would have liked to dwell on literary, philosophic or artistic subjects as he did with his other correspondents. However, Catherine was far more interested in winning the philosopher's approval than in entering a philosophical dialogue. The content of her letters does not permit one to see her primary motives as anything other than propagandistic. She is not at all interested in broadening her cultural and intellectual horizons. Catherine seeks no advice from Voltaire on how to rule Russia.... Instead Catherine tries to impose her views, justify her policies and explain away her failures. Voltaire is, for Catherine, the best method of diffusing favorable information in Europe. As a testament to Catherine's political ingenuity, she skillfully kept Voltaire at arm's length, feigning a belief in absolute liberalism in her letters while, in practice, implementing repressive reforms in her country. For example, the opinion she shares with Voltaire regarding serfdom did not always correspond with the laws she passed. "The Empress turned over 800,000 peasants to private proprietors. The 1763 law limiting freedom of movement by requiring the peasant to get a permit from the landlord before he/she could leave the property has been cited as evidence that Catherine enserfed peasants in the name of fiscal expediency,". Catherine's correspondence largely acted as propaganda intended to assure Voltaire (and Europe) of Russia's prosperity. Handicapped by distance and a lack of information, Voltaire was simply too willing to believe in Catherine's liberalism.

Despite her impure intentions, Catherine remained a loyal and unwavering disciple of Voltaire. Catherine revered the philosopher whose work she had read since her youth. Upon receiving a poem from Voltaire dedicated to her, the empress was "totally overwhelmed by her emotions…In a letter full of flattery and profound respect…Catherine announced that she had no desire to read any literary works that were not written as well as Voltaire's,". She often called Voltaire her "teacher", her "thinking instructor", and her "master of thought,". After his death in 1778, Catherine wrote letters to her contemporaries imploring them to study and memorize his works. "She believed that the study of his work educated citizens, that it helped to form geniuses, heroes and writers, and that it would help to develop thousands of talents,". Her devotion to Voltaire after his death remains evident of her sincere and genuine reverence of him.

Throughout her reign, Catherine remained committed to intellectual pursuits and encouraged members of her court to engage in them as well. The empress provided her palace staff with a library and reportedly spent an average of 80,000 rubles annually on books. In his essay, "Catherine the Great: Enlightened Empress?" Simon Henderson implores the reader to consider the constraints the empress faced when deciding if she was truly an enlightened despot. Henderson asserts that despite her deceptive tactics, she always possessed an "unswerving commitment to modernizing Russia,". Early on, Catherine concerned herself with the philosophies and culture of the enlightenment. Though she often agreed with their liberal positions, her status in court was entirely reliant upon the support of noble families. As a result, the Empress could not always implement reforms the way she would have liked. For example, when confronted with the issue of serfdom, Catherine initially suggested in her proposal of "the Instruction" that landowners offer serfs the option to "purchase their freedom" or that the government limit the period of servitude to six years. However, the nobles omitted this section from the document as it did not benefit them. "Rather than seeing her as insincere in her concern for the peasantry, historians have recently highlighted…what she might have achieved had the circumstances been different,". Despite the constraints, Catherine did manage to implement few policies that benefitted the serfs. In 1767 it was forbidden for foster parents to enserf illegitimate children and in 1781 enserfment of prisoners of war was prohibited and a law passes that saw marriage of a free man to a serf woman emancipate the woman. Catherine is known to have investigated and then bought out landowners who were reported to ill-treat their serfs,. Voltaire outwardly supported emancipation of the serfs. The philosopher believed that the Russian aristocracy "should not permit the vast majority of the people to go on suffering from the arbitrariness of [the] very laws who ought to be to afford protection to each and all,". Furthermore, in an attempt to create a more educated bureaucracy, Catherine moved to bring better education to her people. In 1786, she established the Russian Statute of National Education to launch a national school system. As a result of her campaign to modify Russia, Catherine successfully introduced the tsardom to the Western world and furthered the degree to which it was involved in European affairs. While Catherine worked to bring enlightenment principles to Russia, Voltaire worked to improve her reputation in Europe. The philosopher enthusiastically adopted her cause, commending her to friends in high places, advising her in politics, and distributing her texts to the liberal media, thereby cementing her title as an enlightened despot. "Voltaire participated in a campaign to protect Catherine's reputation…he wrote pamphlets in support of her policies…[and] published her pronouncements in the western press,". In a letter to Marquis D'Argenson, a French statesman, Voltaire asked him to help "re-establish [Catherine's] reputation in Paris", (Lentin 13). Catherine, happy with rise to popularity, admits to Prince De Ligne: "It was certainly Voltaire who brought me into fashion,".

However, Voltaire certainly recognized the benefits of fraternizing with the Empress of Russia. The philosopher enjoyed socializing with Europe's elite and often boasted of his influential friends. "He avowed the usefulness of having a crowned up [his] sleeve…". Furthermore, as a result of his association with Catherine, Voltaire saw it beneficial for his own reputation to rid the Empress of her disparaging image. "As Catherine's name was linked more and more to that of the philosophes, it became important that she be cleared of such any unsavory charges,". Thus neither pen pal was possessed entirely "pure" intentions. Yet, despite their ulterior motives, the correspondence remains an important document recording the political pursuits of an Empire. Catherine's alignment with Voltaire acted as an early indication of the Russian tsardom moving towards closer relations with Europe.

Correspondence

The main topics of discussion in the Voltaire-Catherine letters were Russia's foreign and domestic affairs. Despite their mutual affection for literature, art and philosophy, very rarely did Catherine and Voltaire discuss such topics. One scholar has suggested that Catherine did not have the intellectual capacity to have such discussions with Voltaire, and that Catherine brought up primarily political affairs in her letters in order to impart her political ideas onto Voltaire. They did discuss cultural matters in the year 1772, which suggests that Catherine wanted to distract Voltaire from her recent partition of Poland.

Both Catherine and Voltaire wrote to each other in generally approbatory tones. Voltaire's letters to Catherine have been described as "a catalogue of extravagant and unqualified compliments, and fulsome approbation of her policies." He even addressed her as "my Catherine." While Catherine also flattered Voltaire in her letters, she wrote in a more contrived manner, perhaps due to the fact that her secretary Pictet thoroughly revised the letters (unlike the letters she wrote to Frederick the Great) prior to sending them. The main difference between the two sets of letters seems to be that "[Catherine] compliments Voltaire, to tickle his vanity and play on his prejudices", while Voltaire's compliments "convey undertones of hero-worship."

Domestic affairs

In their discussions of Russia's domestic affairs, Catherine only exchanged news with Voltaire that would cast Russia and her rule in a positive light. She sent him news that depicted Russia as an economically stable and prosperous country and to depict herself as the epitome of an enlightened despot.

Catherine greatly exaggerated Russia's economic stability and greatly misinformed Voltaire on the subject. For instance, Catherine in the correspondence never mentioned Pugachev's Rebellion of 1773–74. When Voltaire brought up the subject, Catherine brushed it off by simply saying that she had it under control. As a result, Voltaire never realized the significant economic hardship of Russia's peasant class that had triggered the revolt.

They often discussed legislation, as both strongly advocated for the absolute power of the law. Voltaire asked for information on Catherine's regulations, and Catherine sent Voltaire a copy of her Instructions, which he read twice. The subject of serfdom, in regard to which Voltaire advocated emancipation, also figured prominently in their correspondence. Although Voltaire sent Catherine advice on the subject, he never pushed his ideas, nor did he condemn Catherine for not taking more progressive action against the institution.

Nevertheless, Voltaire made clear his stance regarding serfdom in his submission for an essay competition held by the Free Economic Society of St. Petersburg in 1767. For the subject topic of the contest, Catherine chose "the merits of private ownership of land by the peasants." Voltaire's essay, to his disappointment, only received an honorable mention.

Foreign affairs

The majority of Catherine and Voltaire's correspondence took place during the years 1769–1778, a period in which Catherine found herself largely involved with foreign affairs. Thus, much of their correspondence focuses on Russia's wars in Poland and Turkey and on the themes of religion and civilization.

When Catherine first invaded Poland, Voltaire believed, contrary to popular opinion, that she had done so based on religious tolerance. He believed that she wanted to restore the rights of the non-Catholic Polish minorities rather than to acquire Polish land. Voltaire was proven wrong in 1772, after Catherine's first partition of the country. However, he never condemned Catherine for deceiving him, but rather congratulated both her and the Poles on the outcome. Their discussions of Poland thus reveal what Peter Gay has called a "lack of accurate information, compounded by a deliberate refusal to learn the truth." The affair greatly damaged Voltaire's reputation in Europe.

Another major topic of conversation was Russia's relations with Turkey. As a philosopher, Voltaire disagreed with war in general. However, in his letters he encourages Catherine to go to war with Turkey. He even suggested to Catherine that Russia, Prussia, and Austria unite to divide Turkey. Catherine, however, wanted to conquer Turkey for political and economic reasons. Namely, she wanted to expand Russia's borders to the Black Sea to obtain a base from which she could target Constantinople.

=== Education ===
A more conservative approach was taken by Mikhail Shcherbatov, a publicist and historian whose notion of liberty was influenced by the works of Rousseau. Shcherbatov delivered a scathing criticism of the existing social institutions, maintaining that mass education—rather than far-reaching political reforms and the abolition of serfdom—may be more effective in improving the morals of Russian society.

On a related note, Ivan Betskoy campaigned for the comprehensive reform of education which would result in the development of a "new breed of citizens". His proposals have been implemented in part, e.g., the Smolny Institute was inaugurated for noble maidens, in keeping with Fénelon's doctrine that girls' education was key to the moral regeneration of the corrupt modern society.

Catherine II could be considered the founder of the State University of Land Use Planning, it was announced on May 25, 1779 (on May 14, Julian calendar) that the Surveying School should be opened. The school was named Konstantinovsky in honour of the Great Prince Konstantin Pavlovich, the grandson of Catherine II of Russia who was born in that year. The government and Catherine II of Russia herself patronized and supported the school from the date of its establishing emphasizing a significance of land management and special surveying education. Lack of land surveyors and state importance of land surveying initiated establishing of the school. The legislation of the day emphasized significance of land management: "Current surveying is a business, which is performed not only to the benefit and peace of every holder but the state business containing the Emperor glory and advantage of peace and quiet for all the State."

Catherine's friend Yekaterina Dashkova—sometimes viewed as a precursor of feminism—led the Russian Academy of Sciences for many years. In 1783, she instituted the Russian Academy, which she modeled after the French Academy. Seeking to promote knowledge and study of the Russian language, the Russian Academy prepared the first comprehensive dictionary of the Russian language.

Even the monolith of the Russian Orthodox Church seemed to succumb to the influences of the Enlightenment. The teachings of Platon Levshin, Metropolitan of Moscow, underlined the need for tolerance and encouraged the advancement of ecclesiastical education.

=== Arts ===
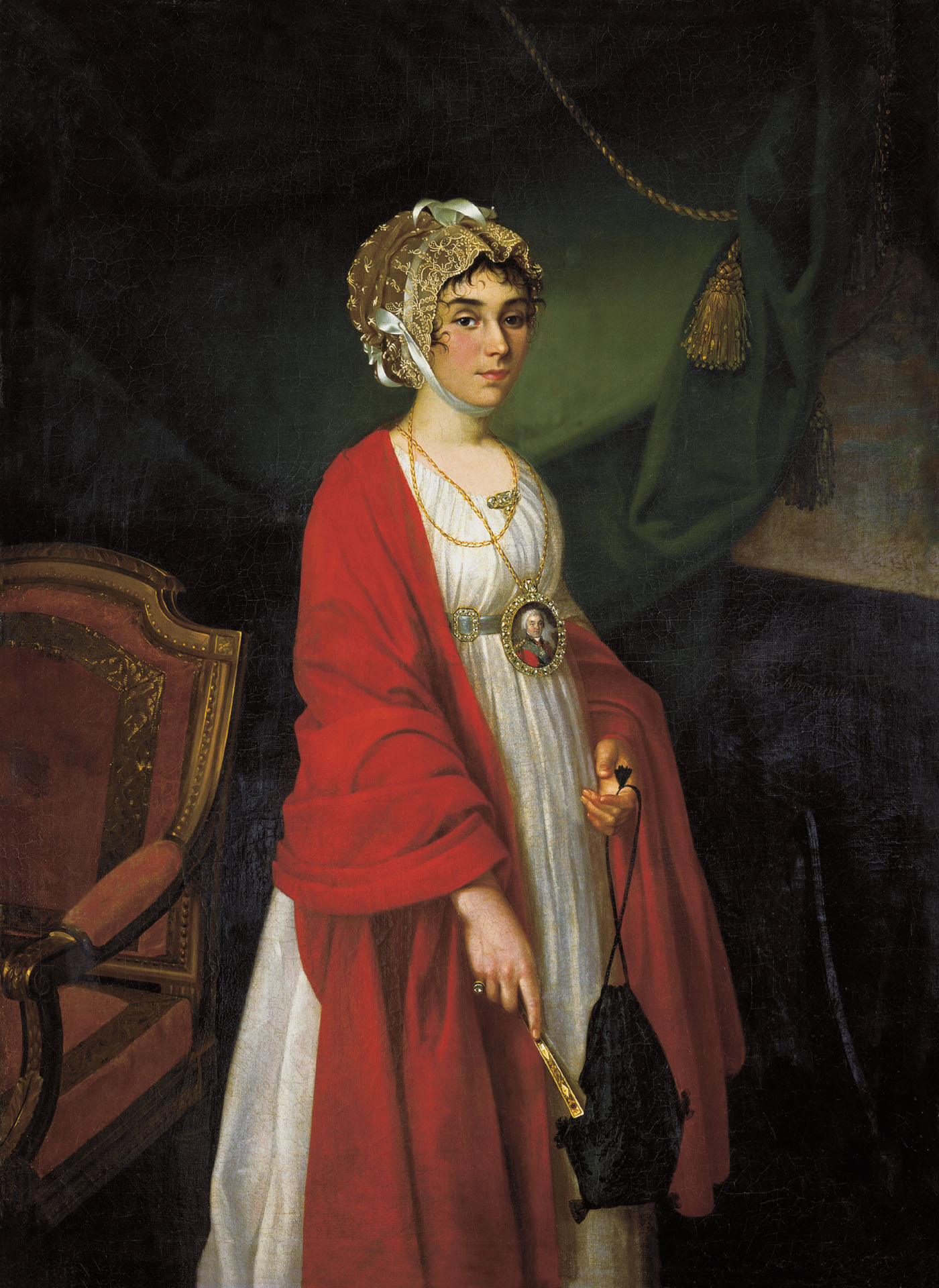
Parasha Zhemchugova, a serf actress-turned-countess.

Enlightenment ideas were popularized by the nascent Russian theatre. The first Russian theater group of this kind was established in Yaroslavl by Fyodor Volkov and Ivan Dmitrievsky during Elizaveta's reign. Aleksandr Sumarokov was responsible for the repertory of their theatre.

During Catherine's reign the leading playwrights included Denis Fonvizin, who ridiculed the rusticity of provincial gentry and their thoughtless imitation of all things French; Vladislav Ozerov, who authored a great number of Neoclassical tragedies with touches of sentimentalism; and Yakov Knyazhnin, whose drama about a popular uprising against Rurik's rule was declared Jacobin and publicly burnt in 1791.

Even Catherine's favourite poet, Gavrila Derzhavin—who sought in his odes to combine amusement with instruction—would see some of his poems banned from print during the last years of her reign.

Opera

Opera reached Russia in 1731, when Empress Anna invited the Italian opera troupe to show Calandro by Giovanni Alberto Ristori during the celebration of her coronation in Moscow. In 1735 another Italian opera troupe led by composer Francesco Araja was invited to work in St. Petersburg. Araja spent 25 years in Russia and wrote 14 operas for the Russian Court including Tsefal i Prokris (1755), the first opera written in Russian to the libretto by Alexander Sumarokov.

Foreign composers like Johann Adolf Hasse, Hermann Raupach, Galuppi, Manfredini, Traetta, Paisiello, Sarti, Cimarosa and Martin y Soler, Ivan Kerzelli, Antoine Bullant, brought important contribution to the Russian opera, to the Italian libretti as well as Russian libretti. There were also extremely popular operas by the Belgian/French André Ernest Modeste Grétry that were widely performed, including in Kuskovo and Ostankino theatres, where they were given with participation of the famous serf-soprano Praskovya Zhemchugova at the private opera of Nikolai Sheremetev.

Catherine II sent some domestic composers like Berezovsky and Bortniansky abroad to study art of music composition and later they produced some operas in Italian and French. And only at the beginning of the 1770s the first modest attempts of the composers of Russian origin to compose operas to the Russian librettos were made. Among these were successful one-act opera Anyuta (1772) to the text by Mikhail Popov, and opera Melnik – koldun, obmanshchik i svat (The Miller who was a Wizard, a Cheat and a Match-maker) to the text by Alexander Ablesimov with music by Mikhail Sokolovsky (1779).

The most important contribution in the opera genre were made by Vasily Pashkevich with his The Carriage Accident (Neschastye ot karety, 1779), The Miser to the text by Yakov Knyazhnin after Molière (1782), and Fevey to the libretto by Catherine II (1786), as well as by Italian trained Yevstigney Fomin with his The Coachmen at the Relay Station (Yamshchiki na podstave, 1787), Orfey i Evridika, opera-melodrama to the text by Yakov Knyazhnin (1792), and The Americans (Amerikantsy, comic opera, 1800).

Other music

In 1746 the first public concert took place in Russia. This soon became a tradition. Concert life was dominated by foreign musicians before Russian virtuosos appeared in the 1780–1790s; these included the violinist Ivan Khandoshkin and singer Elizaveta Sandunova. The senator Grigory Teplov was also an amateur musician who printed in 1751 the collection of his songs entitled Idle Hours Away from Work. Publishing music business, sales of foreign sheet music, and music lovers' periodicals flourished from the 1770s onward.

The overture and songs from Ivan Kerzelli's opera Derevenskiy vorozheya (The Village Wizard) were printed in Moscow 1778; they were the first opera fragments printed in Russia. Sales of musical instruments (like keyboards, guitars and harps) were also growing. Sacred music genres were transformed under the foreign influences. The Italian operatic composers such as Galuppi and Sarti were involved in producing liturgies for the church service. The genre of the choral concerto (the cycle of three–four contrast movements) became traditional in liturgic music of Degtyaryov, Vedel, Bortnyansky, Berezovsky, Davydov, and Turchaninov.

=== Freemasonry ===
Some of the leading figures of the Russian Enlightenment are associated with Freemasonry and Martinism. In the early 1770s, Catherine the Great's secretary Ivan Yelagin succeeded in reorganizing Russian Freemasonry into a far-reaching system that united some 14 lodges and about 400 government officials. He secured English authorization of the first Russian Grand Lodge and became its Provincial Grand Master. Most Russian lodges were attracted to the Swedish Rite. In 1782, Ivan Schwarz, a philosophy professor from Moscow, represented Russia at the Wilhelmsbad conference where Russia was recognized as the 8th province of the Rite of Strict Observance. His friend Nikolay Novikov was in charge of the Moscow lodges. Spooked by the French Revolution, Catherine clamped down on Novikov and other Freemasons in the late 1780s. Her son Paul interdicted all Masonic assemblies in 1799. Novikov and his circle promoted "prosveshchenie" which combined religious piety, erudition, and commitment to the spread of learning. However it bore little similarity to the skeptical and critical spirit of the European Enlightenment.

== Aftermath ==
By 1796, when Emperor Paul succeeded his mother on the Russian throne, the Russian Enlightenment was very much on the wane. Although the new monarch was fiercely opposed to the French libertarian influences, he set free the radical writers imprisoned by his mother, including Novikov and Radishchev. Paul's family enjoyed recitals of didactic fables by Ivan Krylov, a fabulist whose journalistic activity had been denounced by his mother.

The Informal Committee, instituted by Alexander I of Russia in 1801, may be viewed as the last attempt to implement the ideals of the Enlightenment in the Russian Empire. Mikhail Speransky proceeded to outline an ambitious program of political reform, but his chief propositions were not put into execution until the great reforms of Alexander II half a century later.

Valeriani: Sets for the "first Russian opera" Tsefal i Prokris by Araja, 1755.

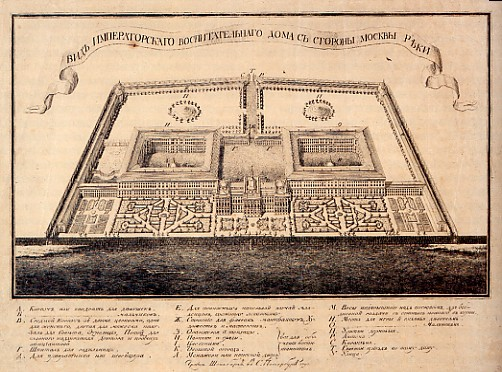
Betskoy's plan for the Foundling Home in Moscow, c. 1764.

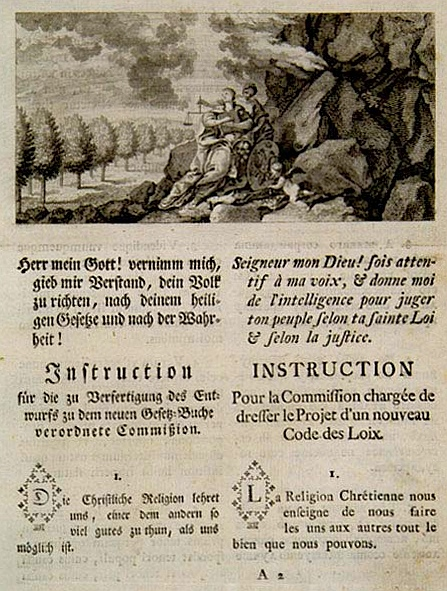
Title page of Catherine II's Nakaz, 1767.

== Bibliography ==
- Billington, James H. The Icon and the Axe: An Interpretive History of Russian Culture (Alfred A. Knopf, 1966)
- Dixon, Simon. The Modernisation of Russia 1676–1825 (Cambridge University Press, 1999)
- Frolova-Walker, Marina: Russian Federation, 1730–1860, (Opera, Concert life, Domestic music making, Sacred music), The Grove Dictionary of Music and Musicians, vol. 21 ISBN 0-333-60800-3
- Kahan, Aracadius. "The Costs of "Westernization" in Russia: The Gentry and the Economy in the Eighteenth Century." Slavic Review 25.1 (1966): 40–66.
- Kelly, Catriona. Refining Russia: Advice Literature, Polite Culture, and Gender from Catherine to Yeltsin (Oxford University Press, 2001).
- Lentin, A. "Catherine the Great and Denis Diderot" History Today (May 1972), pp 313–320 online.
- Riasanovsky, Nicholas V., and Mark D. Steinberg. A History of Russia (8th ed. 2011)
- Taruskin, Richard: Russia in 'The New Grove Dictionary of Opera', ed. Stanley Sadie (London, 1992) ISBN 0-333-73432-7
- Wirtschafter, Elise Kimerling. "Thoughts on the Enlightenment and Enlightenment in Russia", Modern Russian History & Historiography, 2009, Vol. 2 Issue 2, pp. 1–26
- Wirtschafter, Elise Kimerling. "Religion and Enlightenment in Eighteenth-Century Russia: Father Platon at the Court of Catherine II", Slavonic & East European Review, Jan–April 2010, Vol. 88 Issue 1/2, pp. 180–203
- Zhivov, Viktor M. "The Myth of the State in the Age of Enlightenment and Its Destruction in Late Eighteenth-Century Russia", Russian Studies in History, Winter 2009/2010, Vol. 48 Issue 3, pp. 10–29
