= Russian humour =

Native humour of Russia

Russian humour gains much of its wit from the inflection of the Russian language, allowing for plays on words and unexpected associations. As with any other culture's humour, its vast scope ranges from lewd jokes and wordplay to political satire.

== Literature ==
=== 17th century ===
According to Dmitry Likhachov, Russian comedy traditions in literature could be traced back to Praying of Daniel the Immured by Daniil Zatochnik, a Pereyaslavl-born lower class writer who lived between the 12th and 13th centuries. However, it wasn't until the early 17th century when comedy developed into a separate genre as a reaction to the Time of Troubles. A whole line of independent anonymously published works gained popularity; the term "democratic satire" is used by researchers to describe them. All had close ties to the folklore of Russia and were rewritten both in prose and as poems, including nebylitsa (a variation of nursery rhymes).

Most famous are The Tale of Yersh Yershovich and The Tale of Shemyaka's Trial that satirized the Russian judicial system: the first described a trial against a sleazy ruffe, with different fish representing different social classes, while the second focused on a corrupted judge Shemyaka who is often linked to Dmitry Shemyaka. Another outstanding work, The Tale of Frol Skobeev, was inspired by picaresque novels. Satire on Church was also very popular (The Tale of Savva the Priest, The Kalyazin Petition, The Tavern Service) which included parodies of religious texts. Mikhail Bakhtin and Dmitry Likhachov agreed on that many tales were created by low-ranking clergy who made fun of the form rather than content. There were also straight-up parodies of literary genres such as The Story of a Life in Luxury and Fun.

Lubok was one of the earliest known forms of popular print in Russia which rose to popularity around the same time. Similar to comic strips, it depicted various — often humorous — anecdotes as primitivistic pictures with captions. Among the common characters was The Cat of Kazan which appeared in one of the most famous lubki The Mice Are Burying the Cat described by various researchers as a parody on the funeral of Peter the Great, a celebration of Russian victories over the Tatars during the late 16th century or simply an illustration to an old fairy tale.

=== 18th century ===
Next century saw the rise of a number of prominent comedy writers who belonged to the upper class. The most renowned is Denis Fonvizin who produced several comedy plays between 1769 and 1792, most famously The Minor (1782) about a nobleman without a high school diploma. It satirized provincial nobility and became a great success and a source of many quotes, inspiring many future generations of writers. Other names include Antiochus Kantemir who wrote satirical poems and a dramatist Alexander Sumarokov whose plays varied from a straight-up satire against his enemies to comedy of manners as well as the Russian Empress Catherine the Great who produced around 20 comedy plays and operas, most famously Oh, These Time! (1772) and The Siberian Shaman (1786).

== Satirical magazines ==
During the second half of the 18th century satirical magazines rose to popularity, providing social and political commentary. Those included Pochta dukhov (Spirits Mail) and Zritel (The Spectator) by Ivan Krylov who later turned into the leading Russian fabulist, Zhivopisets (The Painter) and Truten (The Drone) by Nikolay Novikov and even Vsyakaya vsyachina (All Sorts) established and edited by Catherine the Great herself. Alexander Afanasyev's 1859 monograph Russian Satirical Magazines of 1769—1774 became an in-depth research on this period and inspired a famous critical essay Russian satire during the times of Catherine by Nikolay Dobrolyubov who argued that the 18th-century satire wasn't sharp or influential enough and didn't lead to necessary socio-political changes.

== Jokes ==
The most popular form of Russian humour consists of jokes (анекдоты — anekdoty), which are short stories with a punch line. Typical of Russian joke culture is a series of categories with fixed and highly familiar settings and characters. Surprising effects are achieved by an endless variety of plots and plays on words.

== Toasts ==
Drinking toasts can take the form of anecdotes or not-so-short stories, which tend to have a jocular or paradoxical conclusion, and ending with "So here's to, let's drink for the..." with a witty punchline referring to the initial story.

== Chastushka ==
A specific form of humour is chastushkas, songs composed of four-line rhymes, usually of black, sarcastic, humoristic, or satiric content.

== Black humour ==
Apart from jokes, Russian humour is very sarcastic and it is expressed in word play. Sometimes there are short poems including nonsense and black humour verses, similar to the Little Willie rhymes by Harry Graham, or, less so, Edward Lear's literary "nonsense verse".

Often they have recurring characters such as "little boy", "Vova", "a girl", "Masha". Most rhymes involve death or a painful experience either for the protagonists or other people. This type of joke is especially popular with children.

A little boy found a machine gun — Now the village population is none.	Маленький мальчик нашёл пулемёт — Больше в деревне никто не живёт.

== See also ==
- Kozma Prutkov
- Novyi Satirikon
- KVN
- Fitil
- Yeralash - Soviet and later Russian children's sketch comedy programme
- Puppets
- Comedy Club (Russia)

== Bibliography ==
- Dmitry Likhachov, Alexander Panchenko (1976). The World of Laughter of Ancient Rus'. Leningrad: Nauka.
- Lev Dmitriev, Dmitry Likhachov (1989). A History of Russian Literature, 11Th-17th Centuries // Democratic satire and humorous literature. Moscow : Raduga Publishers ISBN 978-5050017154
- Sannikov, Vladimir (1999). Russian Language in the Mirror of the Language Game. Moscow: Languages of Russian Сulture. ISBN 5-7859-0077-7 McFarland, WI: Book on Demand Ltd. ISBN 978-5519571241
- Sannikov, Vladimir (2003). Russian Lingual Joke: From Pushkin to Our Days. Moscow: Agraph. ISBN 5-7784-0263-5
