= Democratic satire =

Element of Russian humor

Democratic satire (Rus: Демократическая сатира, Lat: Demokratischeskaya satira) or folk satire is an element of Russian humor, and mostly attributed to the anonymous works of the 17th century. An essential part of the democratic literature of its time. The satirical literature of the 17th century is diverse in terms of genre and theme. However, the main topics were social relations, social vices and injustice, for which satirical literature used both folk oral art and literary and documentary texts, parodied them. This style was formed under the influence of folk satire and influenced Russian satirical literature of subsequent periods.

== Sources and Features of the Genre ==
Elements of satire were contained within some of the earliest of ancient Russian literature, starting from the early chronicles, most of which are associated with the "satiric element" of folk poetry. In the 17th century, there was a flourishing of folk laughter culture, reflecting a departure from the previous book culture and "spiritual reading" and well-aimed folk speech.

In Russian literature, satire first clearly took shape in a satirical story of the 17th century. In the 17th century, the process of the formation of satire as a special type of fiction went hand in hand with the development of folk satire. Literary satire was created in an environment that was still influenced by the legacy of oral poetry. The artistic method and expressive means of the satire style of the 17th century were based on the formed satirical style of folk poets. Both literary satire and folk used the grotesque, exaggeration, parody, although in various manners. Democratic satire, like folk satire, was heterogeneous in terms of its genre and themes.

The forms of a satirical tale, a proverb, a joke, or even a fable were used to as a way to imbue storytelling with satirical elements. The usage of everyday fairy tale was particularly prominent used, stories involving animals used as allusion to real-life figures and human conditions. However, in others satirical proverbs and jokes are the main focus. Folk fiction predominately used this method, the parodying traditional oral poetic genres (parodies of epics, calendar rituals, church rituals and church language, etc.) the most routine method. The satirizing of more formal literary and documentary genres was a main hallmark of folk satire and more generally, the entire form of democratic satire.

Democratic satire also transformed extremely formal and business-orientated themes into literary tropes, often resorting to such a way of expressing a satirical intention as the use of ready-made literary and documentary forms. This way, the parody element was a helpful way to critique and poke fun at their operations, and invoking humor as a way to question the validity of these routine practices. Western stories also belong to the sources of democratic satire, stories about Western vagabonds (using the Vagrant plot[rus] form) and the impropriety of Latin clergy some of the more popular topics discussed.

== Themes ==
A diversity of themes ranging from bureaucratic processes and Western culture to everyday situations and the topical issues of societal inequalities were used in the form of democratic satire as a way to openly critique and ridicule them. However, many are identifiable in particular Russian folk stories from the 16th to the 18th centuries:

- Social relations and legal proceedings
  - The Tale of Ersh Ershovich[rus] (16-17th c.)
- Poverty and social injustices
  - The ABC of a Naked and Poor Man (1663)
- Drunkenness
  - Service to the Kabak (17th c.)
- Judicial corruption
  - The Tale of the Shemyakin Court (17th-18th c.)
- Clerical piety
  - The Tale of the Hen and the Fox (17th c.)
- Vulgar behaviours among the priesthood
  - Kalyazinsky's Petition (17th c.)

== Lasting Influence ==
Democratic satire of the 17th century and the general style of folk satire formed the core of Russian literature's adoption of satirical practices in the 18th and 19th centuries. Writers like Denis Fonvizin, Nikolai Novikov, and Ivan Krylov are among the most well-known satirical writers from the 18th century, while in the 19th century writers like Fyodor Dostoevsky and Leo Tolstoy would continue the trend. According to Nikolai Dobrolyubov, "Our literature began with satire," referring to the fiction genre and its prolific use of satirical messaging and motifs. Democratic literature of the 18th century and partly of the 19th century is associated with the satire of the 17th century by its ideological orientation, its usage of topical subject matter, and the features of the artistic language of the writers. As in the previous century, the satirical literature of the 18th century and later used ready-made literary and documentary texts as a model, as well as church-related materials and activities. A notable thematic carry over from the 16th to the 19th centuries is the motif of the "watchful worker," a peasant or servant who is keenly aware of all the actions around him, both proper and improper alike. They are able to make shrewd judgments and see the characters of people from a sharply honest place, using satire and humor as a way to point out their misdoings.
