= Yelizaveta Belogradskaya =

Russian opera singer and composer of Ukrainian origin

Yelizaveta Belogradskaya Елизавета Белоградская
- Born: 1739
- Origin: Ukraine
- Died: c. 1764 St Petersburg
- Occupation(s): operatic singer, composer
- Instrument: harpsichord

Yelizaveta Belogradskaya (Russian: Елизавета Белоградская) (1739–c. 1764 [?]) was a Russian Imperial Court opera singer, harpsichord player, and a composer for keyboard. She was of Ukrainian origin.

== Life ==
Yelizaveta Timofeevna Belogradskaya was born in 1739. She was the daughter of Osip Bilohradsky, a court singer, and the niece of Timofiy Bilohradsky, a court singer and lutenist. She entered the court service in 1767, as a kammermädchen at the court of the Empress Elizaveta Petrovna in St. Petersburg.

Yelizaveta performed on stage at a very young age. The Chronicle of the Russian Theatre (1861) states that: "In 1756, an Italian opera was performed at the court, in which court singers recruited in Little Russia participated, among them Vinogradskaya [sic] was distinguished by her beautiful voice and skillful singing; she, as those who heard her sing, astounded even the Italian." In 1753 she played the part of Procris in Francesco Araja's opera Cephalus and Procris, which was the first opera set in Russian, with the text by Aleksandr Sumarokov. She sang in Hermann Raupach's The Refuge of Virtue and Alcesta. She appeared at court concerts and festivities as a singer and harpsichord player. Her "Variations on a theme by Starzer" for keyboard are extant.

Belogradskaya died on a uncertain date after 1767. Her grave at the Alexander Nevsky Lavra in St Petersburg is now lost.

== Sources ==
- Svetlov, S.F. (1899). "Russian opera in the 18th century //". Русская опера в XVIII столетии: Ежегодник императорских театров. Сезон 1897–1898 [Yearbook of Imperial Theatres: 1897–1898] (in Russian). Vol. 2. St. Petersburg.
