= Gavrilo Martsenkovich =

Ukrainian opera singer

Gavrilo Martsenkovich (Ukrainian: Гаврило Марцинкéвич; Russian: Гаври́ло Марценко́вич; 1741 – ) known as "Gavrilushka," was a Ukrainian opera actor and singer in the 18th-century Russian Empire.

He was a member of the group called the pevchie (the singers) of Count Andrey Kirillovich Razumovsky. He played the main role (Cephalus) in the opera by Francesco Araja Цефал и Прокрис (Tsefal i Prokris – Cephalus and Prokris) written to a Russian libretto by Alexander Sumarokov after the Metamorphoses by Ovid, staged at St. Petersburg on March 7, [OS February 27], 1755. This performance is considered the first Russian language opera to be staged. Martsenkovich was born in Ukraine and was likely educated at the Hlukhiv school of music.
