= Knyazhnin =

Knyazhnin or Kniazhnin (Russian: Княжнин) is a Russian masculine surname, its feminine counterpart is Knyazhnina or Kniazhnina. It may refer to

- Ekaterina Kniazhnina (1746–1797), Russian poet
- Yakov Knyazhnin (1742–1791), Russian author, husband of Ekaterina
