= Von =

German preposition, nobiliary particle

The term von ([fɔn]) is used in German surnames either as a nobiliary particle indicating a noble patrilineality, or as a simple preposition used by commoners that means 'of' or 'from'.

Nobility directories like the Almanach de Gotha often abbreviate the noble term von to v. In medieval or early modern names, the von particle was at times added to commoners' names; thus, Hans von Duisburg meant 'Hans from [the city of] Duisburg'. This meaning is preserved in Swiss toponymic surnames and in the Dutch van, which is a cognate of von but also does not necessarily indicate nobility unlike the German equivalent due to the latter being a product of historical tradition and regulation in monarchic states.

== Usage ==
=== Germany and Austria ===
The abolition of the monarchies in Germany and Austria in 1919 meant that neither state has a privileged nobility, and both have exclusively republican governments.

In Germany, this means that legally von simply became an ordinary part of the surnames of the people who used it. There are no longer any legal privileges or constraints associated with this naming convention. According to German alphabetical sorting, people with von in their surnames – of noble or non-noble descent alike – are listed in telephone books and other files under the rest of their names (e.g., the economist Ludwig von Mises would have been found under M in the phone book rather than V).

In Austria, in contrast, not only were the privileges of the nobility abolished, their titles and prepositions were abolished as well in 1919. Thus, for example, Friedrich von Hayek became simply Friedrich Hayek. (See also Austrian nobility on this issue.)

In contrast to the peerage of the United Kingdom, the aristocracies of the German-speaking countries were held to include untitled nobility, although the names of nearly all the families falling into this category did include von, zu, von und zu, von der, von dem, zum, vom und zum or zur.

==== Non-noble use ====
The preposition originated among German speakers during the Middle Ages and was commonly used to signify a person's origins, appending the name of the place they originated from (see toponymic surname), or the name of their parents, as the concept of a surname did not start to come into common usage until later on.

Nevertheless, it was mostly aristocrats and other land owners who acquired a surname consisting of von, zu or zur and a toponym. When families were raised to nobility later on, the prefix was added in front of their existing name whatever its source, e.g. von Goethe. In some cases, even an existing non-noble von became noble, or vice versa, therefore the same surname sometimes would be shared by noble and non-noble individuals.

Especially in the Northwest (Bremen, Hamburg, Holstein, Lower Saxony, Schleswig, Westphalia) and in German-speaking Switzerland, von is a frequent element in non-noble surnames. About 200 to 300 known non-noble surnames contain the element von. On the other hand, especially in Lower Saxony, several prominent noble surnames do not contain the particle von, e.g. Grote, Knigge or Vincke.

In order to distinguish the noble von from the non-noble one, the Prussian military abbreviated it to v. in noble names, often without a space following it, whereas the non-noble von was always spelled in full. In the 19th century in Austria and Bavaria, non-noble surnames containing von were widely altered by compounding it with the main surname element, such as von Werden → Vonwerden.

"Untitled" and "non-noble" are not synonyms in the German-speaking world. However, most German nobles used von and most users of von were noble. Nonetheless, desiring to add cachet to their perceived lineages in the era since titles of nobility were abolished, some individuals of no titled descent chose to add the particle to their name, such as movie directors Josef von Sternberg, Erich von Stroheim, and Lars von Trier.

==== Ancient nobility ====
Some very old noble families, usually members of the Uradel, bear surnames without the rather young nobiliary particle von but are nevertheless still noble.

Also, a very few German families were elevated to the nobility without use of the preposition von. This was the case of the Riedesel Freiherren zu Eisenbach who received baronial dignity in 1680.

In order to distinguish themselves from bearers of regionally frequent non-noble surnames containing von, nobles in Northern Germany continue the royal Prussian military practice of abbreviating the noble von to v. but spelling the non-noble von in full.

=== Russia ===
Generally, the growth of the Tsardom of Russia into the Russian Empire was accompanied by the inflow of German surnames. Two main channels of such migration were the absorption of territories where Germans constituted a part of local nobility, such as Finland, Poland, and the Baltic region, and the state-supported immigration of Germans into Russia, such as the Volga Germans.

As a rule, the members of the local nobility who found themselves in Russia as a result of geopolitical shifts preserved their privileges in the Empire. Their surnames were listed in the State Register of Noble Families as soon as the required documents were provided. The particle von was preserved as well; once hyphens came into common use in the 18th and 19th centuries, it was used to connect the von with the following part of the surname (e.g. Russian: Фон-Визин, von-Wiesen). However, since the twentieth century the particle has been written separately, as in the German origin. In the Baltic region, the German language continued to be used alongside Russian, so the language environment was friendly enough there to keep these surnames from localisation.

Meanwhile, some of those whose ancestors individually entered the Russian service from abroad, and who settled themselves in Moscow or the core Russian provinces, sooner or later found it easier to adjust their surnames to the local speaking mode. However, unlike immigrants to English-speaking countries during the 18th to 20th centuries, who usually lost their nobility particles and often simplified and anglicised the remaining parts of their surnames, immigrants to the Tsarist and Imperial Russia did not lose their noble particles, although some of their core surnames may have experienced some minor changes.

At the end of the 16th century, after the Livonian War, Ivan IV of Russia invited Baron Berndt von Wiesen (German pronunciation: [fɔn viːzən]) from the Livonian Brothers of the Sword into Russian service and granted him some landed property. In the 17th century his descendants wrote their surnames as Russian: Фон Висин (which preserved the German spelling rather than the Russian pronunciation: [fɐn ˈvʲisʲɪn]). c. 1660 one of them added-ov (Russian: Фон Висинов, Russian pronunciation: [fɐn ˈvʲisʲɪnəf]), yet in the 18th century this suffix was lost, and the middle consonant changed again s→z (Russian: Фон-Визин, which preserves the German pronunciation rather than spelling: Russian pronunciation: [fɐn ˈvʲizʲɪn]). Finally, in the 18th century Ivan Fonvizin decided to merge the particle von with the core, thus giving a start to a new Russian family of German origin. His son, Denis Fonvizin (Russian: Фонви́зин, Russian pronunciation: [fɐnˈvʲizʲɪn]) became a playwright whose plays are staged today.

=== Nordic countries ===
In the Nordic countries, von is common but not universal in the surnames of noble families of German origin and has occasionally been used as a part of names of ennobled families of native or foreign (but non-German) extraction, as with the family of the philosopher Georg Henrik von Wright, which is of Scottish origin, or as with the family of the painter Carl Frederik von Breda, who was of Dutch ancestry.

In Denmark, from the 1770s it became standard practice for every Danish military officer to put "von" in front of his surname. "Von" in this context can be said to be a characteristic of the nobility of the sword – a class that was not otherwise represented in Denmark. This practice was inspired by the Prussian military, where most officers belonged to the landed gentry. The use of von became so widespread that government authorities used it in official letters, but it never received any real recognition.

== Capitalization ==
=== In German ===
The German dictionary Duden recommends capitalizing the prefix von at the beginning of the sentence, but not in its abbreviated form, in order to avoid confusion with an abbreviated first name. However the Swiss Neue Zürcher Zeitung style guide recommends omitting the von completely at the beginning of the sentence.

Examples, meaning "Von Humboldt came later.":

- Duden styles: "Von Humboldt kam später." and "v. Humboldt kam später."
- Neue Zürcher Zeitung style: "Humboldt kam später."
