= Mikhail Shcherbatov =

Imperial historian (1733–1790)

Prince Mikhail Mikhailovich Shcherbatov
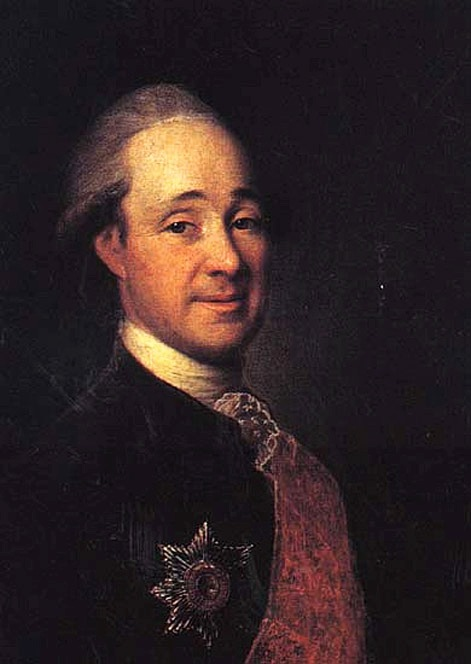
- Portrait by Dmitry Levitzky
- Born: 22 July 1733; Moscow, Russian Empire
- Died: 12 December 1790 (aged 57); St. Petersburg, Russian Empire
- Occupation: Imperial Historian

Prince Mikhail Mikhailovich Shcherbatov (Russian: Михаи́л Миха́йлович Щерба́тов; 22 July 1733 – 12 December 1790) was a leading ideologue and exponent of the Russian Enlightenment, on the par with Mikhail Lomonosov and Nikolay Novikov. His view of human nature and social progress is kindred to Swift's pessimism. He was known as a statesman, historian, writer and philosopher, and was one of the most visible representatives of the nascent Russian conservatism during the second half of the 18th century.

== Early life ==
Coat of arms of the Princes Shcherbatov

Scherbatov was the son of Prince Mikhail Yuryevich Scherbatov (1678-1738), Governor-general of Moscow, by his third wife, Princess Irina Soncowa-Zasekina (d. 1765). His belonging to the oldest of Russian families may explain Scherbatov's lifelong interest in the national history. In a series of articles published in 1759-61 he defended serfdom and upheld ancient privileges of nobility which had been repealed by Peter the Great. M. M. Shcherbatov received a good-formal education. He studied history, philosophy, literature and medicine. Until the end of his life he had a vast collection of 40,000 volumes in his home library. Like all educated people of that time he knew French, and in addition to that, he was also competent in German, Italian and a few other western languages. From 1767 onwards, Shcherbatov was in the public service and held responsible posts. He represented the Yaroslavl nobility at the Nakaz commission (1767), was a member of a private commission of the middle-class people, a member of the Board of Trade (1770), a president of the Chamber Council and a Senator (1779).

In 1768 he received the position of historiographer and was appointed a Chief Herald of the Senate. In his view the political ideal was to follow the British example of a constitutional monarchy with separation of powers. He found a certain analogy to this ideal in Pre-Petrian Russia when, in his opinion, autocracy was confined to the use of such aristocratic organ as the Council Boyars. Mikhail's personal view and attitude of Peter I of Russia or Peter the Great (who ruled Russia from 7 May 1682 until his death in 1725) in his writings was quite ambiguous. In one of his drafts "An examination of defects and autocracy of Peter the Great" (1782), he openly criticized Peter, arguing that what he did for the prosperity of Russia can be done by more humane means, resulting in smaller losses even though it might take a longer period of time. In Shcherbatov's opinion, without foreign borrowing and the autocracy of Peter the Great, significantly much more time would have been needed for the Russian Enlightenment and foreign policy opponents meanwhile could have captured the country. Yet, Shcherbatov was aware that, apart from the personal weaknesses, the roughness and cruelty of the autocrat were caused by the viciousness of the time. Peter was forced by the time to be a despot.

When elected by the nobility of Yaroslavl to represent their interests at the Legislative Assembly of 1767, Shcherbatov virulently slammed the existing institutions of the Russian Empire. He caught the attention of the Empress and was appointed imperial historian in 1768 and president of a ministry in 1778. He worked in the Senate from 1779 to 1786.

Scherbatov's History of Russia from the Earliest Times, of which seven volumes appeared between 1771 and 1791, is imbued with rationalistic ideals of the Age of Reason. He thought that inequality was inherent to human nature and illustrated this tenet in the first Russian utopia, entitled Journey to the Land of Ophir (Russian: Путешествие в землю Офирскую) (1784). Scherbatov's final and probably most lasting work was a scathing attack on the contemporary social customs in the treatise On the Corruption of Morals in Russia (Russian: О повреждении нравов в России), published in 1797.

== Shcherbatov as a historian and publicist ==
In one of his most famous works "On the corruption of morals in Russia" Mikhail Shcherbatov criticized the mass abuses committed by the authorities, such as bribery, embezzlement of public funds, servility, etc. There was also criticism of the methods of Peter the Great by which he promoted "obscure people" and in turn led to a state crisis. Yet, Shcherbatov tried to be unbiased and to show both the positive and negative sides of Peter's modernization. He wrote about changes made in Russia by Peter's reforms, drawing his attention not only to changes in political and military areas, but also in the field of culture, specifying that due to Europeanization, "in the matter of personal and certain other matters, one can say we truly enjoyed remarkable success and moved forward with giant steps to correcting how we appear to others".

After the accession of Catherine the Great Russia (who reigned as an Empress of Russia from 28 June 1762 until 1796), Shcherbatov participated in the Established Commission (1767–1771). He supported the elimination of cards on the Table of Ranks and the expansion of the rights of the Russian nobility. However, he was not a pure "court" ideologist, caring only about "narrow interests", as some Soviet researchers are inclined to think. In regard to attached serfs who belonged to merchants and worked in their factories, Shcherbatov considered it necessary to have them registered in their places but not allowing any more to be bought. As far as those serfs who were registered at the factories, he proposed to free them little by little, giving them freedom as a reward for good character and excellent knowledge of arts. Shcherbatov stood for the preservation of serfdom, arguing that the peasants, being uneducated, would not be able to properly use their freedom. He also believed that the problems of serfdom could be solved, not by destroying it, but gradually as a result of changes in attitude and treatment of farmers by landlords.

Shortly before his death, Shcherbatov created two works, which reflected his views on politics: "Various Opinions about Government" and "General Thoughts about Legislation". In those works, he distinguished four forms of government: monarchy, despotism (or autocracy), aristocracy and democracy and considered the monarchic government the most comprehensible. Shcherbatov saw the ideal monarch as the one who esteems himself father of the people, who does not reject legislation to establish autocracy, who does not divide his interests with the interests of the State and who is adept at choosing councillors among people, combining diligence to their sovereign with love for motherland and laws". However, the majority of the governors, being subject to various "passions", could not meet the given characteristics. The aristocratic board was not comprehensible to Russia yet. Failure or unwillingness of people to suppress their excessive ambition, selfishness and lust for power "generates divisions, parties, hatred and evil, which in essence were a result of those destructive passions". The democratic governments "gnaws at its own entrails dividing into various parties, which in various troubled times are tossed like a ship on a stormy sea, often escaping being sunk by the skill of the pilot, but even more often perishing, sometimes even right at the dock".

Rejecting autocracy as a form of government, Scherbatov wrote "yet there is torture, in which there are no other laws and regulations except for the insane self-will of the despot". The Russian views on legislation were a result of the practical work of Shcherbatov in various public institutions. Since the establishment of the new laws required a thorough examination of the subject, Shcherbatov believed that "laws should be composed by a few impartial people, reasonable, familiar, hardworking and devoted to state affairs ". Comparing laws in the various forms of government, Shcherbatov pointed out the advantage of the monarchy, which, having its solid established laws could provide for its citizens' security for their lives, property and tranquility.

Ideas about the state system received development in Shcherbatov's utopian work "A Journey to the Land of Ophyr". His main idea was that laws should be based on moral principles and the citizens of the state should honour first virtue, then law, and after that – the king and the authorities. Their lives are dependent, in the first place, on their natural freedom, and after that to their civil responsibilities, which do not try to limit the freedom save only to impose certain duties in relation to the society. In this sense, he believed that people should honour and obey the laws; relationships inside society lie on humane principles and respect for each other and for the monarch, wherein a framework may be created for social balance and political peace within the boundaries of the country.

In that work, Shcherbatov developed his system for the prosperity and well-being of society, the basis of which lay in the idea that honor and respect for the monarch should not be rooted in any form of egoistic servility or hope of receiving a reward. He also supported the idea of a structure within society that is divided into several hierarchical classes, according to which the life of every citizen is regulated. At the top of the pyramid is the king, who should not be seen as almighty but as "the first among equals". Then come the landlords and merchants. The lowest is the class of peasants. Although they were not free, the legislation of the utopian state would require that their masters treat them humanely, provide for their needs, respect their work and refrain from harsh punishment.

Nowadays Scherbatov's ideas still attract the attention of Russian and foreign researchers of Russian conservatism movement and are fervently discussed in numerous books and articles.

== Private life ==
Mikhail was married to his cousin, Princess Natalia Ivanovna Shcherbatova (1729—1798), the daughter of Prince Ivan Andreevich Shcherbatov (1696–1761), a prominent Russian diplomat at the Spanish, Ottoman, and British courts, and his wife, Praskovya Ivanovna Streshneva. Together, they had two sons and four daughters.
