= Anecdota =

Anecdota may refer to:

- The Anecdota or Secret History of Procopius
- Hence an anecdote
