= Freiherr =

Title of nobility in the Holy Roman Empire and its successor states

Typical Freiherr coronet with seven pearls, as used on a coat of arms

Freiherr (German: [ˈfʁaɪˌhɛɐ̯]; male, abbreviated as Frhr.), Freifrau ([ˈfʁaɪˌfʁaʊ]; his wife, abbreviated as Frfr., lit. 'free lord' or 'free lady') and Freiin ([ˈfʁaɪ.ɪn], his unmarried daughters and maiden aunts) are designations used as titles of nobility in the German-speaking areas of the Holy Roman Empire, the Austro-Hungarian Empire and in its various successor states, including Austria, Prussia, Bavaria, Liechtenstein, Luxembourg, etc. Traditionally, it denotes the titled rank within the nobility above Ritter (knight) and Edler (nobility without a specific title) and below Graf (count or earl). The title superseded the earlier medieval form, Edelherr.

It corresponds approximately to the English baron in rank. The Duden orthography of the German language references the French nobility title of Baron, deriving from the Latin-Germanic combination liber baro (which also means "free lord"), as corresponding to the German "Freiherr"; and that Baron is a corresponding salutation for a Freiherr.

== Freiherr in the feudal system ==
The title Freiherr derives from the historical situation in which an owner held free (allodial) title to his land, as opposed "unmittelbar" ("unintermediated"), or held without any intermediate feudal tenure; or unlike the ordinary baron, who was originally a knight (Ritter) in vassalage to a higher lord or sovereign, unlike medieval German ministerials, who were bound to provide administrative services for a lord. A Freiherr sometimes exercised hereditary administrative and judicial prerogatives over those resident in his barony instead of the liege lord, who might be the duke (Herzog) or count (Graf).

== Freiherr vs. Baron ==
The German-language title of Freiherr is rendered in English as "Baron", although the title was derived separately in the two languages. Even in German, a Freiherr is often styled as and addressed by the more elegant, Latin equivalent "Baron" in social circumstances, although not the official title.

Separately, in the 19th century some families of the Baltic German nobility who had historically carried the title of Freiherr were recognized by the Tsardom of Russia as noble in the form of ukases additionally awarding the equivalent Russian title of Baron. When in 1919 privileges to members of dynastic and noble families were abolished by the constitution of the Weimar Republic and hence titles became part of the last name some members of the affected families chose to be officially named Freiherr while others preferred Baron to emphasize their Baltic-German heritage. This is why members of the same family can have different official last names.

The original distinction from other barons was that a Freiherr's landed property was allodial instead of a fief.

Barons who received their title from the Holy Roman Emperor are sometimes known as "Barons of the Holy Roman Empire" (Reichsfreiherren), in order to distinguish them from other barons, although the title as such was simply Freiherr. After the dissolution of the Holy Roman Empire in 1806, Reichsfreiherren did not belong to the noble hierarchy of any realm, but by a decision of the Congress of Vienna in 1815, their titles were nonetheless officially recognised. From 1806 the then independent German monarchies, such as Bavaria, Württemberg and Lippe could create their own nobility, including Freiherren (although the Elector of Brandenburg had, as king of the originally exclusively extraterritorial Prussia even before that date, arrogated to himself the prerogative of ennoblement). Some of the older baronial families began to use Reichsfreiherr in formal contexts to distinguish themselves from the new classes of barons created by monarchs of lesser stature than the Holy Roman Emperors, and this usage is far from obsolete.

== Function ==
=== Prior to abolition of nobility ===
As with most titles and designations within the nobility in the German-speaking areas of Europe, the rank was normally hereditary and would generally be used together with the nobiliary particle of von or zu (sometimes both: von und zu) before a family name.

The inheritance of titles of nobility in most German-speaking areas was not restricted by primogeniture as is the baronial title in Britain. Hence, the titles applied equally to all male-line descendants of the original grantee in perpetuity: All legitimate sons of a Freiherr shared his title and rank, and could be referred to as Freiherr. The wife of a Freiherr is titled Freifrau (literally "free lady"), and the daughter of a Freiherr is called Freiin (short for Freiherrin). Both titles are translated in English as "Baroness".

In Prussia and some other countries in northern Europe, the title of Freiherr was, as long as the monarchy existed, usually used preceding a person's given name (e.g. Freiherr Hans von Schwarz). In Austria-Hungary and Bavaria, however, it would be inserted between the given name and the family name (e.g. Hans Freiherr von Schwarz).

=== Since abolition of nobility ===
After the First World War, the monarchies were abolished in most German-speaking areas of Europe, and the nobility lost recognition as a legal class in the newly created republics of Germany and Austria.

==== In Austria ====
The Republic of Austria abolished hereditary noble titles for its citizens by the Adelsaufhebungsgesetz of 3 April 1919 and the corresponding decree of the state government. The public use of such titles was and still is prohibited, and violations could be fined. Hans Freiherr von Schwarz, as an Austrian citizen, therefore lost his title of Freiherr von and would simply be named as Hans Schwarz in his Austrian passport.

In practice, however, former noble titles are still used socially in Austria; some people consider it a matter of courtesy to use them. The late Otto von Habsburg, in his childhood Crown Prince of Austria-Hungary, was styled Otto Habsburg-Lothringen in his post-1919 Austrian passport, and Otto von Habsburg in his German passport (he was a Member of the European Parliament for Germany).

In 2003, the Constitutional Court (Verfassungsgerichtshof) ruled that an Austrian woman having been adopted by a German carrying an aristocratic title as part of his name is not allowed to carry this title in her name. The Federal Administrative Court (Verwaltungsgerichtshof) in a similar case asked the European Court of Justice whether this Austrian regulation would violate the right of the European Union; the European Court of Justice did not object to the Austrian decision not to accept the words Fürstin von as part of an Austrian woman's name.

==== In Germany ====
The German republic, under Article 109 of the Weimar Constitution of 1919, legally transformed all hereditary noble titles into dependent parts of the legal surname. The former title thus became a part of the family name, and moved in front of the family name. Freiherr Hans von Schwarz, as a German citizen, therefore became Hans Freiherr von Schwarz. As dependent parts of the surnames ("nichtselbständige Namensbestandteile") they are ignored in alphabetical sorting of names, as is a possible nobiliary particle, such as von, and might or might not be used by those bearing them. Female forms of titles have been legally accepted as a variation in the surname after 1919 by a still valid decision of the former German High Court (Reichsgericht). The distinguishing main surname is the name, following the Freiherr, Freifrau or Freiin and, where applicable, the nobiliary particle – in the preceding example, the main surname is Schwarz and so alphabetically is listed under "S".

== Parallel titles ==
Similar titles have been seen in parts of Europe that have historically been dominated by Germany (in the cultural sense): the Baltic States, Austria–Hungary, Sweden, Finland and to some extent in Denmark–Norway.

=== Swedish and Danish–Norwegian title ===
From the Middle Ages onward, each head of a Swedish noble house was entitled to vote in any provincial council when held, as in the Realm's Herredag, later Riddarhuset. In 1561, King Eric XIV began to grant some noblemen the titles of count (greve) or baron (friherre). The family members of a friherre were entitled to the same title, which in time became Baron or Baronessa colloquially: thus a person who formally is a friherre now might use the title of "Baron" before his name, and he might also be spoken of as "a baron".

However, after the change of constitution in 1809, newly created baronships in principle conferred the dignity only in primogeniture. In the now valid Swedish Instrument of Government (1974), the possibility to create nobility is eliminated; and since the beginning of the twenty-first century, noble dignities have passed from the official sphere to the private.

In Denmark and Norway, the title of Friherre was of equal rank to that of Baron, which has gradually replaced it. It was instituted on 25 May 1671 with Christian V's Friherre privileges. Today only a few Danish noble families use the title of Friherre and most of those are based in Sweden, where that version of the title is still more commonly used; a Danish Friherre generally is addressed as "Baron". The wife of a Danish or Norwegian Friherre is titled Friherreinde, and the daughters are formally addressed as Baronesse. With the first free Constitution of Denmark of 1849 came a complete abolition of the privileges of the nobility. Today titles are only of ceremonial interest in the circles around the monarchy of Denmark.

=== Finnish title ===
In 1561, the Swedish king Eric XIV conferred the hereditary titles of count and vapaaherra ("baron") on some persons, not all of them nobles. This prerogative was confirmed in the constitutional arrangements of 1625. All family members of vapaaherra (baronial) families were entitled to that same title, which in practice, came to mean that they were addressed as Paroni or Paronitar. The Finnish nobility shares most of its origins with Swedish nobility. In the beginning, they were all without honorific titulature, and known just as "lords". In subsequent centuries, while Finland remained an autonomous grand duchy, many families were raised in rank as counts, vapaaherras, or as untitled nobles. Theoretically, all created vapaaherra families were given a barony (with some rights of taxation and jurisprudence), but such fiefs were only granted in the 16th and 17th centuries. Thereafter the "barony" was titular, usually in chief of some already-owned property, and sometimes that property was established as a fideicommiss. Their property tax exemption continued into the 20th century, being, however, diminished substantially by reforms of the 19th century.

== See also ==
- Imperial Knight
- Boyar
