= Giuseppe Bonecchi =

18th-century Italian poet

Giuseppe Bonecchi was an Italian poet and opera librettist.

He was brought to the Russian Empire in 1740 by Francesco Araja, an Italian composer working in Russia.

His opera Il Bellerofonte, which was written for the coronation of Elizabeth of Russia, praised the virtues of the Empress. A Russian translation was printed in 1757. Josef Mysliveček would later use the same libretto for his opera Il Bellerofonte which premiered in Naples in 1767. Another opera called Scipione was written for the wedding celebration of Elisaveta and Pyotr Feodorovich. He frequently used to plagiarize the work of other poets and dramatists, and this spoiled his reputation. He left for Italy in 1752.

== Operas ==
He wrote the libretti for the following operas by Francesco Araja:

- Seleuco, opera seria, (May 7, 1744 [OS April 26], Moscow)
- Scipione, opera seria, (September 4 or 5, 1745 [OS August 23 or 24], St. Petersburg)
- Mitridate, opera seria, (May 7, 1747 [OS April 26], St. Petersburg)
- L'asilo della pace, opera seria, (May 7, 1748 [OS April 26], St. Petersburg)
- Il Bellerofonte, opera seria, (December 9, 1750 [OS November 28], St. Petersburg)
- Eudossa incoronata, o sia Teodosio II, (May 9, 1751 [OS April 28] St. Petersburg)

He wrote the libretto for the following cantata by Nicolo Conforto:

- "La Pesca", (1756, Madrid)

== Quotations ==
“Alexander Sumarokov angrily exclaimed in the letter to I. I. Shuvalov on March 12, 1761: “I am assigned to the post of a Director of the Theatre but not to the mean title of a theatrical poet, which was Bonecchi... But I will be not a Bonecchi-like theatrical poet even if this would cost me a life…”” (Konstantin Kovalev)
