= Hermann Raupach =

German composer (1728–1778)

Hermann Friedrich Raupach (December 21, 1728 – December 12, 1778) was an 18th-century German composer.

== Biography ==
Hermann Raupach was born at Stralsund in Germany, the son and pupil of composer and organist Christoph Raupach (1686–1744) and the nephew of Lutheran church historian Bernhard Raupach (1682–1745). Raupach was a harpsichordist, who became the assistant of Vincenzo Manfredini, at the Russian Imperial Court Orchestra in Saint Petersburg in 1755. In 1758 he was appointed a Kapellmeister and court composer. Some of his operas were performed in Russian. His Alceste (Альцеста, 1758) is regarded as "the second Russian opera" (after Araja's Tsefal i Prokris, 1755). The role of Admet in this opera was sung by Dmitry Bortniansky, called the "Orpheus of the Neva River".

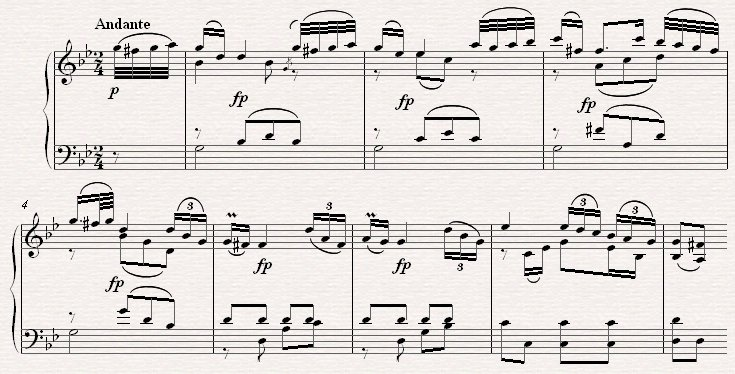
W. A. Mozart's adaptation of Andantino from the Sonata by Hermann Raupach in his Piano Concerto No. 4, in G, the second movement, K. 41, dated by Leopold Mozart July 1767, Salzburg.

In 1762 Raupach left Saint Petersburg for Hamburg and then to Paris, where he met Wolfgang Amadeus Mozart and improvised with him on harpsichord in 4 hands. Mozart arranged some movements from his sonatas for piano and string orchestra. The Sonata for Piano and Violin in A major, that was listed as K. 61, (Note: The number was changed into K. Anh 290a and then later into K. Anh C.23.07. See here) first appeared under Mozart's name in the Breitkopf & Härtel OEuvres in 1804. It had been in Baron Taddäus von Dürnitz collection, and was mistakenly thought to be by Mozart. In 1912 Téodor de Wyzewa and Georges de Saint-Foix discovered that the real composer was Hermann Raupach. They believed the young Mozart copied this sonata to use for an arrangement for a piano concerto, as he had used works of Raupach in K. 37, K. 39 and K. 41; see also: Piano Concertos Nos. 1–4 (Mozart).

Later Raupach returned to Saint Petersburg, where he became the instructor of composition and singing at the Academy of Fine Arts from 1768 to 1778. The composers Dmitry Bortniansky and Yevstigney Fomin were among his pupils. He died in Saint Petersburg.

== Works ==
Operas

- Alceste, (Russian: Альцеста – Alcesta, text by Alexander Sumarokov in Russian (1758, Saint Petersburg)
- The New Monastery (1759)
- Siroe, in Italian (1760, Saint Petersburg)
- Good Soldiers (Добрые солдаты – Dobryie soldaty, 29 February 1780, Saint Petersburg)

Others

- About 15(?) ballets
- Cantatas to the Psalms in Russian translation by Mikhail Lomonosov (His Psalm 145 was especially popular)
- Violin sonatas
