= Anecdote =

Remarkable or characteristic story

An anecdote is "a story with a point", such as to communicate an abstract idea about a person, place, or thing through the concrete details of a short narrative or to characterize by delineating a specific quirk or trait.

Anecdotes may be real or fictional; the anecdotal digression is a common feature of literary works and even oral anecdotes typically involve subtle exaggeration and dramatic shape designed to entertain the listener. An anecdote is always presented as the recounting of a real incident involving actual people and usually in an identifiable place. In the words of Jürgen Hein, they exhibit "a special realism" and "a claimed historical dimension".

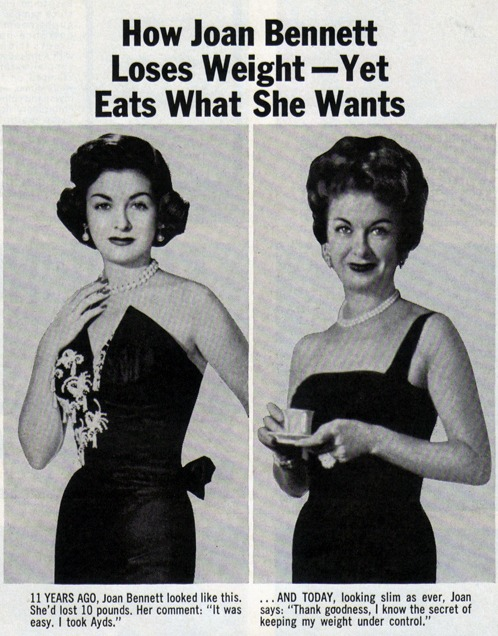
Anecdote in weight loss advertising

== Etymology and usage ==
The word anecdote (in Greek: ἀνέκδοτον "unpublished", literally "not given out") comes from Procopius of Caesarea, the biographer of Emperor Justinian I (r. 527–565). Procopius produced c. 550 CE a work entitled Ἀνέκδοτα (Anekdota, variously translated as Unpublished Memoirs or as Secret History), which consists primarily of a collection of short incidents from the private life of the Byzantine court. Gradually, the term "anecdote" came to be applied to any short tale used to emphasize or illustrate whatever point an author wished to make. In the context of Greek, Estonian, Lithuanian, Bulgarian and Russian humor, an anecdote refers to any short humorous story without the need of factual or biographical origins.

== As evidence ==
Anecdotal evidence is an informal account of evidence in the form of an anecdote. The term is often used in contrast to scientific evidence, as evidence that cannot be investigated using the scientific method. The problem with arguing based on anecdotal evidence is that anecdotal evidence is not necessarily typical; only statistical evidence can determine how typical something is. Misuse of anecdotal evidence is an informal fallacy.

When used in advertising or promotion of a product, service, or idea, anecdotal evidence is often called a testimonial. The term is also sometimes used in a legal context to describe certain kinds of testimony. Psychologists have found that people are more likely to remember notable examples than the typical example.
