= Giuseppe Valeriani =

Italian painter (before 1708 – 1762)

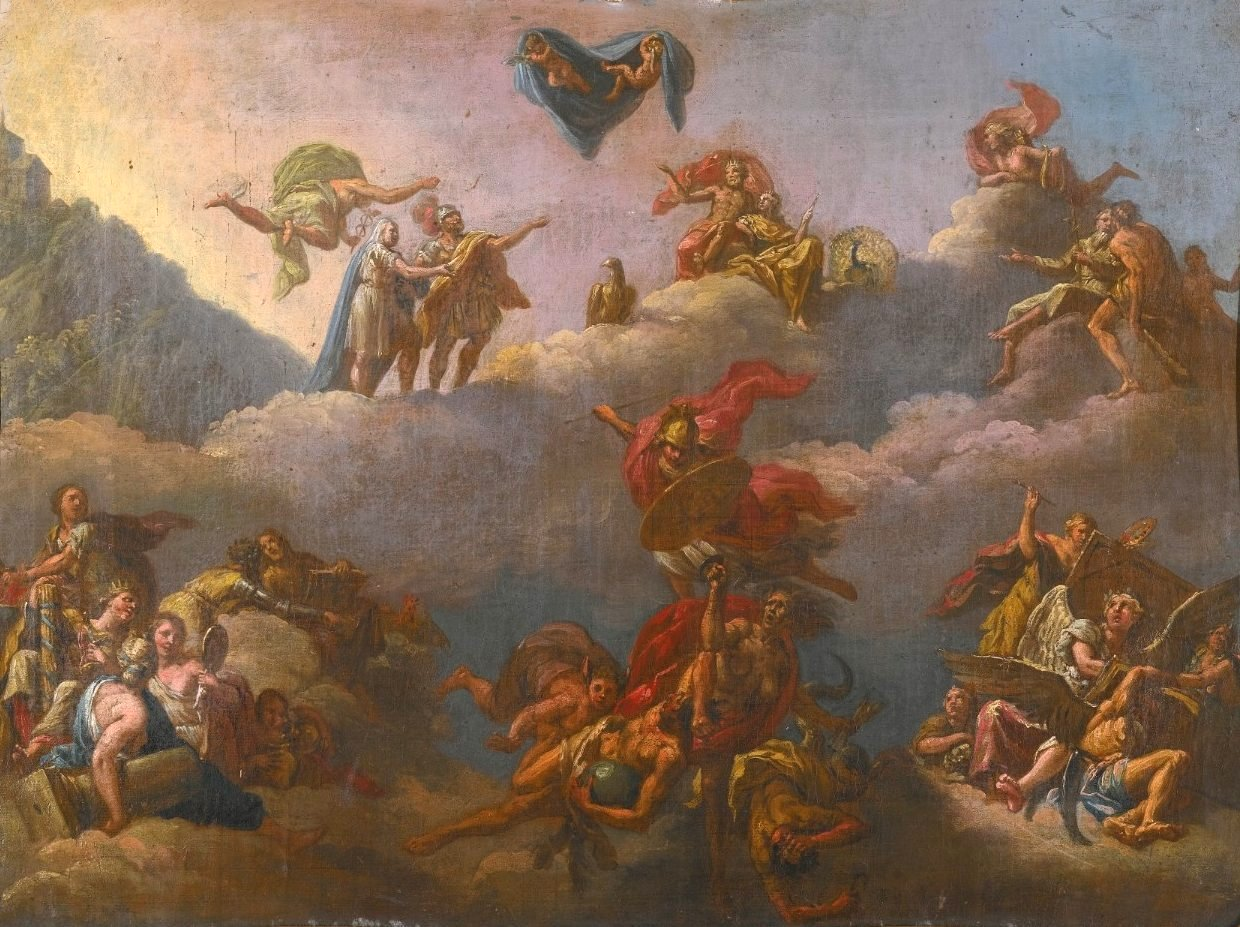
Allegorical Scene of Russia Partaking in the Bounties of Civilization (one of his few free-standing paintings)

Giuseppe Valeriani (Russian: Джузеппе Валериани; before 1708, Rome – April 18, 1762, Saint Petersburg) was an Italian artist who primarily painted murals and stage scenery.

== Biography ==
Giuseppe Valeriani was born in Rome. Several sources give his birth year as 1708, but this is incorrect and he must have been born before this year. In 1716 he and his brother Domenico began apprenticing under painter Marco Ricci in Venice. In 1721 the brothers were resident scenic designers at the Teatro San Angelo where their earliest designs were the sets for a production of Giuseppe Maria Orlandini's Antigona. They then worked as scenic designers for the Teatro San Giovanni Grisostomo from 1722 through 1731. They notably designed the sets for the world premiere of Nicola Porpora’s Ezio at that theatre in 1728.

While primarily working out of Venice, the Valeriani brothers also had contracts with theaters elsewhere. In October 1724 they designed the sets for the Munich production of Pietro Torn’s Amadis di Grecia. From 1731 through 1733 the brothers were committed to making designs to decorate the Palazzina di caccia of Stupinigi in Turin; a contract they were given by the architect Filippo Juvarra. From 1735-1739 they were in Rome where Giuseppe was a resident scenic designer at the Teatro delle Dame.

In 1742, Giuseppe Valeriani was appointed theatre engineer to the court of St. Petersburg. In St. Petersburg he designed the interior of the first opera house built in Russia; a building which was completed in 1750 and designed by the architect Francesco Bartolomeo Rastrelli. It had its inaugural performance in December 9, 1750. He designed the sets to numerous operas at that theatre, including three operas by Francesco Araia: Alessandro nell’Indie (1755 and 1759), Amor prigioniero (1755) and Bellerofonte (1757).

By 1745, Valeriani had become a Professor at the Academy of Sciences. He maintained a large workshop that employed numerous artists; including a young Dmitry Levitzky, who would later become a famous portrait painter. Among his best known works are ceilings at the Catherine Palace and its attached Grand Resurrection Church (destroyed by fire); plafonds at Peterhof Palace and Stroganov Palace and a series of ten canvases depicting ancient Rome, now at the Hermitage Museum.

Valeriani died in St. Petersburg on April 18, 1762.

== Sources ==
=== Bibliography ===
- Jacob Shtelin, Музыка и балет в России 18 века (Music and Ballet in 18th Century Russia), Triton (reprint, 1935)
- M. S. Konopleva, Театральный живописец Джузеппе Валериани (Theater painter Giuseppe Valeriani), Hermitage, 1948 (Ozon)
- Jacob Shtelin, Записки о живописи и живописцах в России (Notes on Painting and Painters in Russia)
