= Jürgen Hein =

German philologist, germanist and specialist in literature

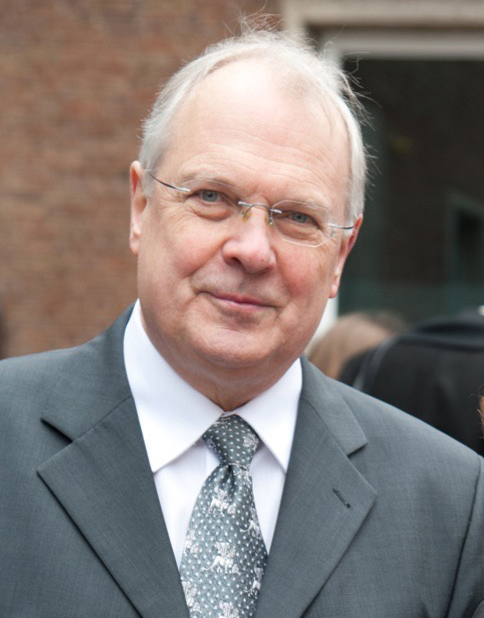
Jürgen Hein (2012)

Jürgen Hein (12 January 1942 – 1 December 2014) was a German literary critic and university lecturer.

== Career ==
Hein was born in Cologne. After his Abitur from high school he engaged in German studies, philosophy and pedagogics at the University of Cologne. In 1968 he was awarded a doctorate in philosophy. From 1969 he also worked as a lecturer at the Pädagogische Hochschule Rheinland, Cologne department. In 1972 he habilitated in Cologne. From 1973 until his retirement in 2007, Hein was professor of modern German literary studies and didactics of literature at the Westfälische Wilhelms-Universität Münster.

Hein died in Vienna at age 72.

== Editions and studies ==
Hein published mainly on Ferdinand Raimund, Johann Nestroy and the Alt-Wiener Volkstheater, as well as on village history and the folk play. He was co-editor and editor (11 volumes with 15 parts) of the new Historical-Critical Nestroy Edition (HKA Nestroy, 1977–2004).

Hein was also editor of anthologies (Deutsche Anekdoten, Parodies of the Viennese Folk Theatre, Nestroy for Pleasure, Viennese Songs). He also wrote essays on the writers and poets Willibald Alexis, Berthold Auerbach, Christian Dietrich Grabbe, Franz Grillparzer, Friedrich Hebbel, Karl von Holtei, Ödön von Horváth, Wolfgang Koeppen, Karl May, Fritz Reuter, Peter Rosegger, Adalbert Stifter, Carl Zuckmayer and many others.
