= Ivan Fonvizin =

Russian noble

Ivan Andreevich Fonvizin (1705–1792, in Bronnitsky Uyezd) was a Russian noble who served as a Russian court councillor from 1766 till 1783, and then from 1783 till his death, as a State Councillor in the Russian Empire. He was the father of playwright Denis Fonvizin.
