= Ekaterina Kniazhnina =

Russian poet

Ekaterina Aleksandrovna Kniazhnina (also Knyazhnina; Russian: Екатери́на Алекса́ндровна Княжнина́; 1746 – 6 June 1797) was a Russian poet.

== Life ==
Kniazhnina was the daughter of Alexander Sumarokov, a poet and playwright, and Ohanna Khristiforovna Balk, a lady-in-waiting to the future Catherine the Great. She was born and lived in St. Petersburg. She married Yakov Knyazhnin in 1770. She was one of the first Russian women to have poetry published in Russian journals. Kniazhnina was the hostess of an important literary salon.

She was the first Russian woman to write an elegy and is considered by Brockhaus and Efron Encyclopedic Dictionary to be "the first Russian woman writer". She, along with Elizaveta Kheraskova and Alexandra Rzhevskaia were the first women to see their works printed in Russian journals.

She died on 6 June 1797.

== Legacy ==
Ivan Krylov wrote a parody about Kniazhnina and her husband in 1787, Prokazniki (The trouble-makers).

== Sources ==
- "Княжнина, Екатерина Александровна" . Brockhaus and Efron Encyclopedic Dictionary (in Russian). 1906.
