= The Minor (Fonvizin play) =

1782 play by Denis Fonvizin

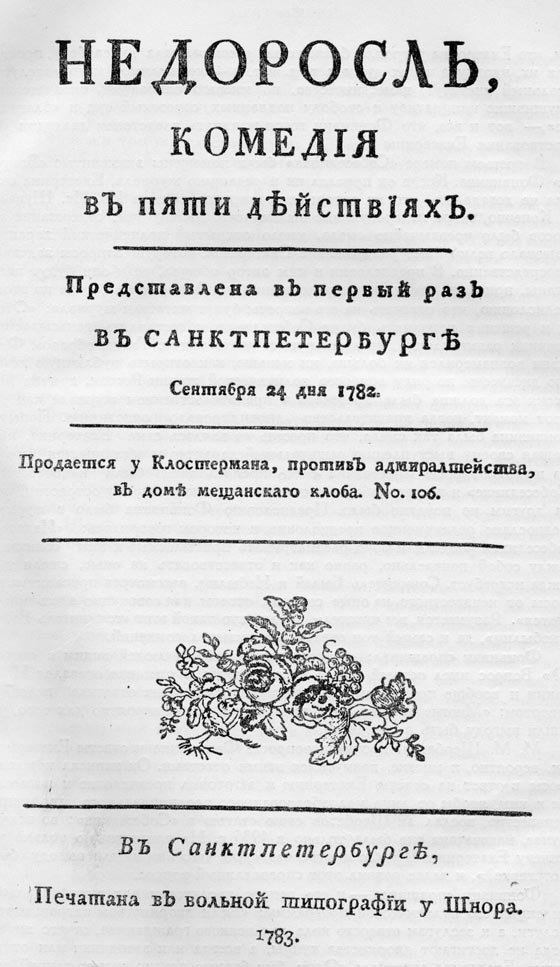
- Title page of the first published edition (1783)
- Original title: Недоросль
- Original language: Russian
- Written by: Denis Fonvizin
- Genre: Comedy, play

Premiere
- Date: 5 October [O.S. 24 September] 1782, Saint Petersburg

The Minor (Russian: Недоросль; also translated as The Infant and The Young Hopeful), is a 1782 comedy play by Denis Fonvizin. It is usually regarded as the greatest pre-19th-century Russian play.

== Commentary ==
On watching it, Prince Grigory Potemkin is purported to have said: "die, Denis: you won't write anything better!", a popular Russian phrase.

The point of the satire in The Minor is directed against the brutish and selfish crudeness and barbarity of the uneducated country gentry. The central character, Mitrofanushka, is the accomplished type of vulgar and brutal selfishness, unredeemed by a single human feature—even his fondly doting mother gets nothing from him for her pains. The dialogue of these vicious characters (in contrast to the stilted language of the lovers and their virtuous uncles) is true to life and finely individualized; and they are all masterpieces of characterization—a worthy introduction to the great portrait gallery of Russian fiction.

As a measure of its popularity, several expressions from The Minor have been turned into proverbs, and many authors (among whom Alexander Pushkin) used to cite from this play, or at least hint to it by mentioning the characters' names.

Faddei Bulgarin wrote a satirical fantasy novel Похождения Митрофанушки в Луне (The Adventures of Mitrofanushka in the Moon) (1837).
