= Vsyakaya vsyachina =

18th-century Russian weekly satire magazine

Vsyakaya vsyachina (Russian: "Всякая всячина", which may be translated as Tutti-Frutti or All Sorts and Sundries) was a Russian weekly magazine, established in 1769. It was based in Saint Petersburg.

In 1770, there were 18 issues of the magazine entitled Барышек всякия всячины (Baryshek vsyakiya vsyachiny). Empress Catherine II was a private editor-in-chief of the magazine. Vsyakaya vsyachina ridiculed the morals and manners of the Russian gentry and protected moderate moralizing satire. At the same time, the magazine came out against oppositionary moods in the society, primarily attacking progressive satiric magazines published by Nikolay Novikov.
