= Tsefal i Prokris =

1755 opera seria by Francesco Araja

- Opera seria by Francesco Araja
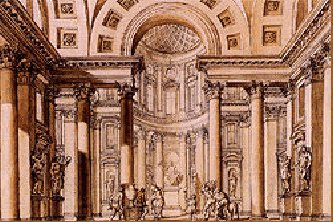
- Giuseppe Valeriani: Sketch of sets for the opera, 1755
- Native title: Russian: Цефал и Прокрис
- Librettist: Alexander Sumarokov
- Language: Russian
- Based on: Metamorphoses by Ovid
- Premiere: 7 March 1755; Zimniy Dvorets, St. Petersburg

Cephalus and Prokris (Russian: Цефал и Прокрис – Tsefal i Prokris), is an opera seria in three acts by the Italian composer Francesco Araja. Dating to 1755, it was the first opera written in the Russian language.

Araja composed the opera to a Russian libretto by Alexander Sumarokov after the Metamorphoses of Ovid.

== Performance history ==
It was staged at St. Petersburg in a wing of Zimniy Dvorets on March 7, [OS February 27], 1755 with effective sets by Giuseppe Valeriani. It was the first opera performed with Russian singers. The main roles were performed by Elisaveta Belogradskaya (Prokris) and Gavrilo Martsenkovich known as "Gavrilushka" (Cephalus). The other actors were "pevchie" (the singers) of Count Andrey Kirillovich Razumovsky: Stefan Evstafiev (Aurora), Stefan Rzhevsky (Erechtheus, the King of Athens), Nikolay Ktitarev (Minos, the King of Crete), Ivan Tatishchev (Tester, the nobleman of Minos and magician). This opera had a great success, and the composer received a luxurious sable coat valued at 500 rubles as a gift from Empress Elizaveta Petrovna. This opera was re-staged at the Mariinsky Theatre in St. Petersburg on June 14, 2001.

== Plot ==
The story of Cephalus and Prokris, who were ready to destroy their matrimonial vows and later happily forgive each other, thus far random tragic finale does not separate them (hunting Cephalus mistakenly pierces his wife with the spear) was transformed by Sumarokov into something quite different. His libretto is the story of devoted love and the tragic fate of two heroes. Being separated, they severely suffer and do not search for compromises. Cephalus, stolen directly from the wedding ceremony in the temple, rejects the love of the powerful goddess Aurora. But meanwhile Prokris, suffering from jealousy, is moving towards her inevitably death: Cephalus, aimed supposedly at the beast, mortally wounds his own wife.

== Bibliography ==
- Цефал и Прокрис. СПб., – Tsefal i Pokris, St. Petersburg, 1755
- Энциклопедический словарь Брокгауза и Ефрона - Brokgaus & Efron: Encyclopaedic Dictionary, (1890—1907)
- Штелин Я. Музыка и балет в России XVIII века. // Музыкальное наследство. Вып. 1. М., 1935
- Старикова Л. М. Новые документы о деятельности итальянской труппы в России в 30-е годы XVIII века <...> // ПКНО. 1988. М., 1989
- Сумароков А.П. Избранные произведения. Л., 1957
- Сумароков А. П. Полное собрание сочинений <...>.Ч. IX. СПб., 1787
- Штелин Я. Музыка и балет в России XVIII века
