= Zhivopisets =

1772–3 Russian weekly satire magazine

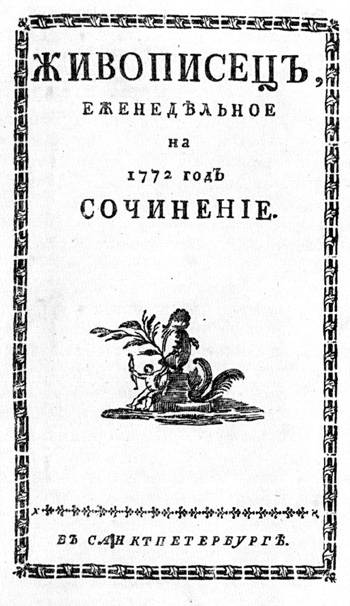
Zhivopisets

Zhivopisets (Russian: "Живописец", which may be translated as Painter) was a Russian weekly magazine, published by Nikolay Novikov in Saint Petersburg from April 1772 to June 1773.

Zhivopisets was notable for its political sharpness and variety of satirical genres. The magazine published Отрывок путешествия в*** И*** Т*** (A Fragment of a Journey to*** I*** T***) and Письма к Фалалею (Letters to Falaley), which contained harsh criticism of the Russian serfdom. Zhivopisets ridiculed a blind admiration with everything French, careerism, and vices of the gentry. The magazine was closed down by the authorities in 1773.
