= Nikolay Novikov =

Russian writer (1744–1818)

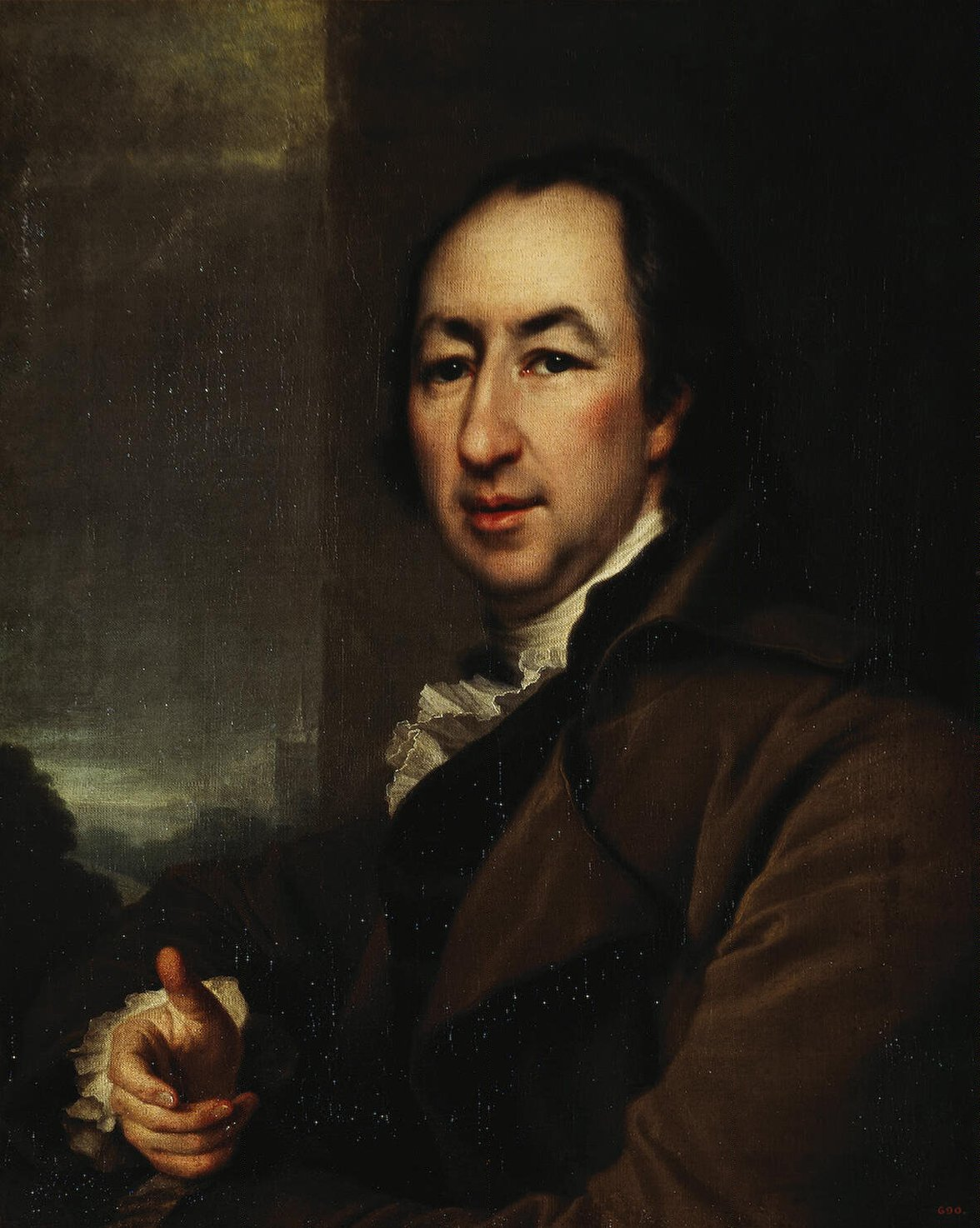
Portrait of Nikolay Novikov, by Dmitry Levitzky.

Nikolay Ivanovich Novikov (Russian: Никола́й Ива́нович Новико́в; 8 May [O.S. 27 April] 1744, Moscow Governorate – 12 August [O.S. 31 July] 1818 Moscow Governorate) was a Russian writer and philanthropist most representative of the Russian Enlightenment. Frequently considered to be the first Russian journalist, he aimed at advancing the cultural and educational level of the Russian public.

Novikov belonged to the first generation of Russians that benefited from the creation of Moscow University in 1755. He took an active part in the Legislative Assembly of 1767, which sought to produce a new code of laws. Inspired by this kind of freethinking activity, he took over editing the Moscow Gazette and launched satirical journals, including Zhivopisets, patterned after The Tatler and The Spectator. His attacks on the existing social customs prompted jocund retorts from Catherine the Great, who even set her own journal called Vsyakaya vsyachina to comment on Novikov's articles.

Together with Johann Georg Schwarz, Ivan Lopukhin, and Semyon Gamaleya he brought martinism and rosicrucianism to Russia. By the 1780s, Novikov rose to the highest positions in Russian Freemasonry, which liberally funded his ambitious book-publishing ventures. Novikov's press produced a third part of contemporary Russian books and several newspapers. Novikov used his influence for various noble purposes, such as a large-scale project of promoting Shakespeare to the Russian public.

When the French Revolution started, Catherine changed her attitude towards the likes of Novikov. His printing house was confiscated. Three years later, without a formal trial, he was incarcerated in the Shlisselburg Fortress for 15 years. Much of his printed material was pulped, including 1,000 copies of Edward Young's The Last Day (1713). Emperor Paul set Novikov free, but the latter was too scared and broken-hearted to resume his journalistic activities.
