= Denis Fonvizin =

Russian playwright and writer (1745–1792)

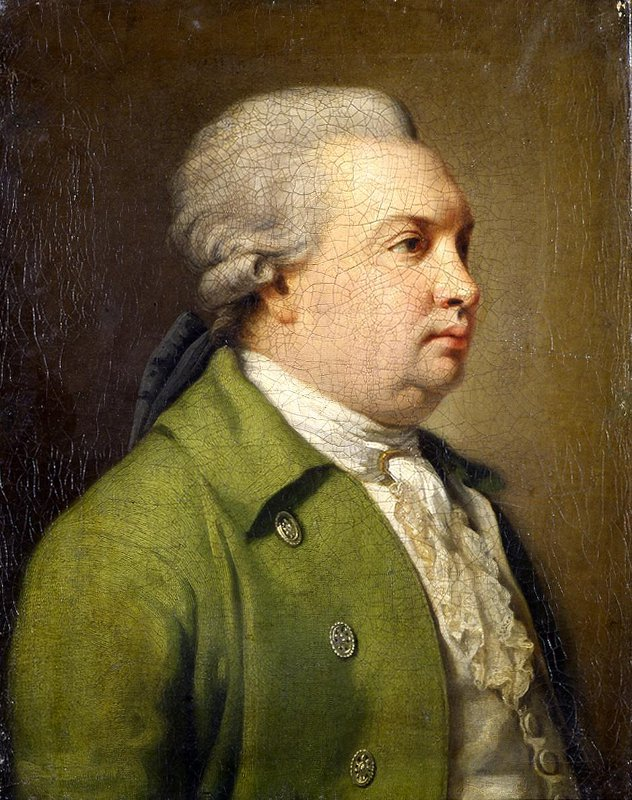
- Portrait by Armand-Charles Caraffe, c. 1784–1785
- Born: Denis Ivanovich Fonvizin; 14 April 1745; Moscow, Russia
- Died: 12 December 1792 (aged 47); Saint Petersburg, Russia
- Resting place: Lazarevskoe Cemetery, Saint Petersburg
- Education: Imperial Moscow University
- Occupations: Writer; playwright; translator
- Spouse: Ekaterina Ivanovna Rogovikova (1774–1792)

Denis Ivanovich Fonvizin (Russian: Денис Иванович Фонвизин, IPA: [dʲɪˈnʲis ɪˈvanəvʲɪtɕ fɐnˈvʲizʲɪn]; 14 April [O.S. 3 April] 1745 – 12 December [O.S. 1 December] 1792) was a Russian playwright during the Age of Enlightenment. He was one of the founders of literary comedy in Russia. His main works are two satirical comedies—including The Minor, which mocks contemporary Russian gentry—which are still staged today.

== Life ==
Denis Fonvizin was born in Moscow into a noble Russian Orthodox family. He was the first of eight children. His mother Ekaterina Vasilievna Fonvizina (née Dmitrieva-Mamonova) (born 1718) belonged to the Smolensk Rurik branch on her father's side and to the Grushetsky family on her mother's side; she was a cousin-niece of Tsaritsa Agafya Grushetskaya and an aunt to Alexander Dmitriev-Mamonov, who was famously a lover of Catherine the Great.

His father Ivan Fonvizin (1705–1785) started as an army officer, then served in the Collegium of Accounting, becoming a State Councillor in 1783. His ancestor Baron Berndt von Wiesen belonged to the Livonian Order, was captured during the Livonian War and became a naturalized Russian citizen; his descendants Russified, and the family name transformed over the years, but it was Ivan Andreevich who started writing it as Fonvizin.

Denis Fonvizin received a good education at the Imperial Moscow University and very early began writing and translating. He entered the civil service, becoming secretary to Count Nikita Panin, one of the great noblemen of Catherine the Great's reign. Because of Panin's protection, Fonvizin was able to write critical plays without fear of being arrested. In the late 1760s, he completed the first of his two famous comedies, The Brigadier-General.

A man of means, he was always a dilettante rather than a professional author, though he became prominent in literary and intellectual circles. In 1777–78 he traveled abroad, the principal aim of his journey being the medical faculty of Montpellier. He described his voyage in his Letters from France—one of the most elegant specimens of the prose of the period, and the most striking document of that anti-French nationalism which among the Russian elite of the time of Catherine went hand in hand with a complete dependence on French literary tastes.

In 1782 Fonvizin's second and best comedy The Minor appeared, which definitely classed him as the foremost of Russian playwrights. His last years were passed in constant suffering and traveling abroad for his health. He died in Saint Petersburg in 1792.

== Works and influence ==
Fonvizin's reputation rests almost entirely on his two comedies, which are beyond doubt the most popular Russian plays before Alexander Griboyedov's Woe from Wit. They are both in prose and adhere to the canons of classical comedy. Fonvizin's principal model, however, was not Molière, but the great Dano-Norwegian playwright Ludvig Holberg, whom he read in German, and some of whose plays he had translated.

Both comedies are plays of social satire with definite axes to grind. The Brigadier-General is a satire against the fashionable French semi-education of the petits-maîtres. Though less serious than The Minor, it is better constructed. But The Minor, though imperfect in dramatic construction, is a more remarkable work and considered Fonvizin's masterpiece.

The point of the satire in The Minor is directed against a portrayal of a selfish and crude uneducated country gentry. The central character, Mitrofanushka, is the portrayed as vulgar and brutally selfish, with even his loving mother gets nothing from him in return.

As a measure of its popularity, several expressions from The Minor have been turned into proverbs, and many authors (amongst whom Alexander Pushkin) regularly cite from this play, or at least hint to it by mentioning the characters' names.
