= Francesco Araja =

Italian composer (1709–1762/1770)

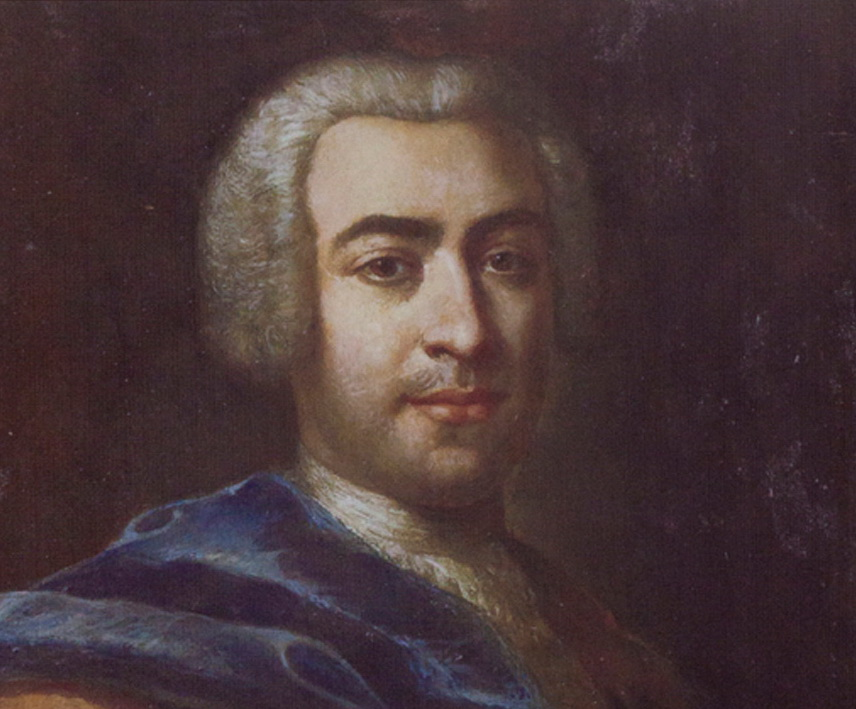
Francesco Araja

Francesco Domenico Araja (or Araia; Russian: Франче́ско Доменико Ара́йя; June 25, 1709 in Naples, Kingdom of Sicily – between 1762 and 1770 in Bologna, States of the Church) was an Italian composer who spent 25 years in Russia and wrote at least 14 operas for the Russian imperial court, including Tsefal i Prokris, the first opera in Russian.

== Biography ==
He was born and received his musical education in Naples and began to compose operas at the age of 20. His early operas were produced in the theatres of Naples, Florence, Rome, Milan, and Venice. In 1735 he was invited to St. Petersburg together with a big Italian opera troupe, and became the maestro di cappella (Kapellmeister) to Empress Anne Ioanovna and later Empress Elizaveta Petrovna.

In the winter operas were usually given in a wing of the Zimniy Dvorets (the Winter Palace), and in the summer time in the Theatre of Letniy Sad in the Summer Garden.

His La forza dell'amore e dell'odio was the first Italian opera performed in Russia. It was staged in 1736 as Сила любви и ненависти (Sila lyubvi i nenavisti - The Power of Love and Hatred) with a supplement to the Russian translation by Vasily Trediakovsky printed as a booklet. This was the first opera libretto printed in Russian. This was followed by Semiramide (Il finto Nino, overo La Semiramide riconosciuta) in 1737, Artaserse in 1738, Seleuco with Russian translation by Sumarokov, premiered in Moscow 1744, Scipione with Russian translation by Adam Olsufiev, in St. Petersburg 1745, Mitridate in 1747, and others.

The majority of the operas he wrote in Russia were to Italian libretti. However, in 1755 Araja composed Цефал и Прокрис (Tsefal i Prokris – Cephalus and Prokris), an opera in three acts to the Russian libretto by Alexander Sumarokov after the Metamorphoses by Ovid. It was staged at St. Petersburg on March 7 [O.S. February 27] 1755, with effective sets by Giuseppe Valeriani. This was the first opera with Russian singers. This opera was a great success, and Araja received 100 half-imperials and a luxurious sable coat valued at 500 rubles as a gift from Empress Elizaveta Petrovna. The opera was re-staged at the Mariinsky Theatre in St. Petersburg on June 14, 2001.

His next two operas were premiered in different Russian towns: Amor prigioniero in Oranienbaum in 1755, and Iphigenia in Tauride in Moscow in 1758. In 1759 Araia returned to Italy, but was recalled for the coronation of Tsar Peter III in 1762. He left soon after in the wake of Peter's overthrow by Catherine the Great. His last compositions were the oratorio La Nativita di Gesu and the opera La Cimotea. He died in Bologna sometime between 1762 and 1770.

== Works ==
=== Operas ===
- Lo matremmonejo pe' mennetta, opera buffa, text by Tommaso Mariani (Autumn 1729, Teatro de' Fiorentini, Naples)
- Berenice, opera seria, text by Antonio Salvi (1730, Teatro Pratolino, Florence)
- Ciro riconosciuto, opera seria, text by Antonio Salvi (Carnival 1731, Teatro Dame, Rome)
- Il Cleomene, opera seria, text by Vicenzo Cassani (Spring 1731, Teatro Dame, Rome)
- L'amor regnante, text by Pietro Metastasio (1731, Rome)
- Semiramide riconosciuta, opera seria, text by Pietro Metastasio (1731, Naples)
- La forza dell'amore e dell'odio, opera seria, text by Francesco Prata (January 1734, Teatro Ducale, Milan; 1736, as Сила любви и ненависти (Sila lyubvi i nenavisti - The Power of Love and Hatred) St. Petersburg)
- Lucio Vero, opera seria, text by Apostolo Zeno, (Carnival 1735, Teatro San Angelo, Venice)
- Il finto Nino, overo La Semiramide riconosciuta, opera seria, text by Francesco Silvani (February 9, 1737 [OS January 28], St. Petersburg)
- Artaserse, opera seria, (February 9, 1738 [OS January 28], St. Petersburg)
- Seleuco, opera seria, text by Giuseppe Bonecchi (May 7, 1744 [OS April 26], Moscow)
- Scipione, opera seria, text by Giuseppe Bonecchi (September 4 or 5, 1745 [OS August 23 or 24], St. Petersburg)
- Mitridate, opera seria, text by Giuseppe Bonecchi (May 7, 1747 [OS April 26], St. Petersburg)
- L'asilo della pace, opera seria, text by Giuseppe Bonecchi (May 7, 1748 [OS April 26], St. Petersburg)
- Bellerofonte, opera seria, text by Giuseppe Bonecchi (December 9, 1750 [OS November 28], St. Petersburg)
- Eudossa incoronata, o sia Teodosio II, text by Giuseppe Bonecchi (May 9, 1751 [OS April 28] St. Petersburg)
- Tsefal i Prokris, opera seria, text by Alexander Sumarokov (March 10, 1755 [OS February 27], St. Petersburg)
- Amor prigioniero, dialogo per musica, text by Pietro Metastasio (June 27, 1755 [OS June 16], Oranienbaum)
- Alessandro nell'Indie, text by Pietro Metastasio (December 29, 1755 [OS December 18], St. Petersburg; 1759, Oranienbaum)
- Iphigenia in Tauride opera seria, (1758, Moscow)
- La Cimotea

=== Oratorios ===
- S. Andrea Corsini, 1731, Rome
- La Nativita di Gesu

=== Cantatas ===
- La gara, dell'amore e dello zelo, St. Petersburg, 1736
- L’asilo della pace (Libretto Giuseppe Bonecchi), St. Petersburg, 1748
- La corona d'Allesandro Magno (Giuseppe Bonecchi), St. Petersburg, 1750
- Amor prigionero (Pietro Metastasio), Oranienbaum, 1755 (see also in the list of the operas)
- Junon secourable lucine (Antonio Denzi), St. Petersburg, 1757
- Urania vaticitante (Antonio Denzi), St. Petersburg, 1757

Also: Sinfonia in D Major for strings, Sonatas, etc.

== Bibliography ==
- "Арайя, Франческо" . Brockhaus and Efron Encyclopedic Dictionary (in Russian). 1906.
- Цефал и Прокрис. СПб., – Tsefal i Pokris, St. Petersburg, 1755
- Энциклопедический словарь Брокгауза и Ефрона - Brokgaus & Efron: Encyclopaedic Dictionary, (1890—1907)
- Штелин Я. Музыка и балет в России XVIII века in the collection Музыкальное наследство. Вып. 1. М., 1935
- Старикова Л. М. Новые документы о деятельности итальянской труппы в России в 30-е годы XVIII века <...> // ПКНО. 1988. М., 1989
- Сумароков А.П. Избранные произведения. Л., 1957
- Сумароков А. П. Полное собрание сочинений <...>.Ч. IX. СПб., 1787
- Ritzarev, Marina (2006), Eighteenth-Century Russian Music (Ashgate) ISBN 978-0-7546-3466-9
