= Alexander Sumarokov =

Russian poet and playwright (1717–1777)

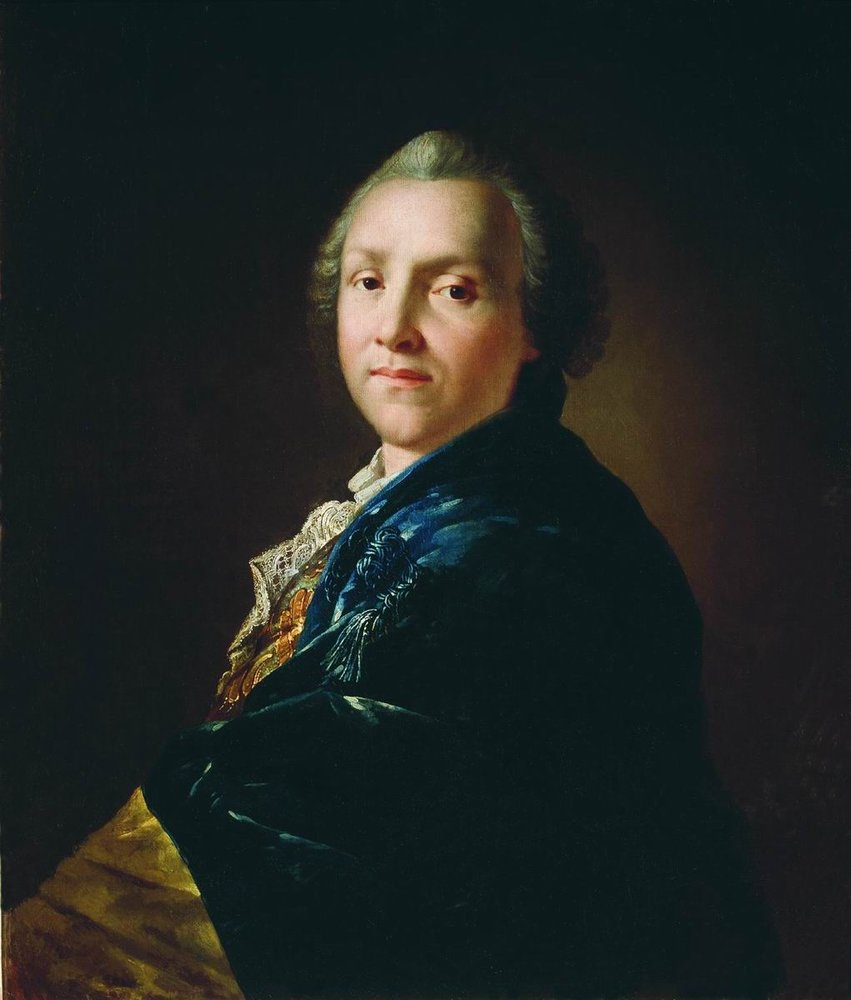
- Portrait by Anton Losenko
- Born: 25 November 1717; Villmanstrand, Sweden
- Died: 12 October 1777 (aged 59); Moscow, Russia
- Children: Ekaterina

Alexander Petrovich Sumarokov (Russian: Алекса́ндр Петро́вич Сумаро́ков; 25 November 1717 [O.S. 14 November], Villmanstrand – 12 October 1777 [O.S. 1 October]) was a Russian poet and playwright who single-handedly created classical theatre in Russia, thus assisting Mikhail Lomonosov to inaugurate the reign of classicism in Russian literature.

== Life and works ==
Alexander Sumarakov was born in 1717 into a family of Muscovite gentry. He was born in Villmanstrand (now Lappeenranta) in Swedish-ruled Finland, where his father was most likely serving in the Great Northern War against Sweden. Sumarokov was educated at the Cadet School in Saint Petersburg, where he became closely familiar with French learning. Neither an aristocratic dilettante like Antiokh Kantemir nor a learned professor like Vasily Trediakovsky or Mikhail Lomonosov, he was the first gentleman in Russia to choose the profession of letters. He consequently may be called the father of the Russian literary profession. His pursuits did not undermine his position in the family; indeed, his grandson was made a count and, when the Sumarokov family became extinct a century later, the title eventually passed to Prince Felix Yusupov, who also held the title of Count Sumarokov-Elston.

Sumarokov wrote much and regularly, chiefly in those literary genres neglected by Lomonosov. His principal importance rests in his plays, among which Khorev (1749) is regarded as the first regular Russian drama. He ran the first permanent public theatre in the Russian capital, where he worked with the likes of Fyodor Volkov and Ivan Dmitrevsky. His plays were based on the subjects taken from Russian history (Dmitry Samozvanets), proto-Russian legends (Khorev) or on Shakespearean plots (Makbet, Hamlet).

In his evaluation of Sumarokov's plays, literary historian D. S. Mirsky writes:

It was no doubt that the good acting made the reputation of Sumarokov, as the literary value of his plays is small. His tragedies are a stultification of the classical method; their Alexandrine couplets are exceedingly harsh; their characters are marionettes. His comedies are adaptations of French plays, with a feeble sprinkling of Russian traits. Their dialogue is a stilted prose that had never been spoken by anyone and reeked of translation.

Sumarokov also wrote non-dramatic works. He was the first Russian author to write fables, a genre which subsequently flourished in Russia. His satires, in which he sometimes imitates the style of popular poetry, are described by Mirsky as "racy and witty attacks against the government clerks and officers of law." He wrote love songs intended for popular consumption, which brought him fame and made him chief among a group of songwriting poets who followed him. Mirsky praises Sumarokov's songs for their "prodigious metrical inventiveness (which was not so much as imitated by any of his successors) and a genuine gift of melody."

Sumarokov was also one of the earliest Russian journalists and literary critics. He edited the journal Yezhemesyachnye sochineniya (Monthly compositions) from 1759 to 1764. According to Mirsky, Sumarokov's literary criticism is "usually carping and superficial" but played a significant role in teaching Russian readers the rules of classical taste. He was a follower of Voltaire and was proud of having exchanged several letters with him. Amanda Ewington has argued that Sumarokov was not only influenced by Voltaire as such but accessed a wide variety of European influences, from Shakespeare to Lope de Vega, through the conduit of Voltaire. Mirsky describes the playwright's personality as follows:

Vain and self-conscious, Sumarokov considered himself a Russian Racine and Voltaire in one. In personal relations he was irritable, touchy, and often petty. But his exacting touchiness contributed, almost as much as did Lomonosov's calm dignity, to raise the profession of the pen and to give it a definite place in society.

His daughter Ekaterina, an 18th-century poet, is often considered to be the first Russian woman writer, as she, together with Elizaveta Kheraskova and Alexandra Rzhevskaia were the first women to see their works printed in Russian journals.

== Opera libretti ==
Sumarokov wrote the first Russian-language libretto for an opera: that of Tsefal i Prokris (Cephalus and Prokris), by Francesco Araja, an Italian composer in the Russian court. The opera was staged in Saint Petersburg on 7 March [O.S. 27 February] 1755. He also wrote the libretto for the second opera set to a Russian text, Altsesta (Alceste, 1758), by German composer Hermann Raupach (1728–1778), also serving in the Russian court.

== Editions in English ==
- Selected Tragedies of A. P. Sumarokov. Translated by Richard and Raymond Fortune. Evanston, Ill.: Northwestern University Press. 1970. ISBN 0810103265. OCLC 1484985587.
- Selected Aesthetic Works of Sumarokov and Karamzin. Translated by Henry M. Nebel, Jr. Washington, D.C.: University Press of America. 1981. ISBN 9780819119094. OCLC 7775604.
