= List of Russian-language playwrights =

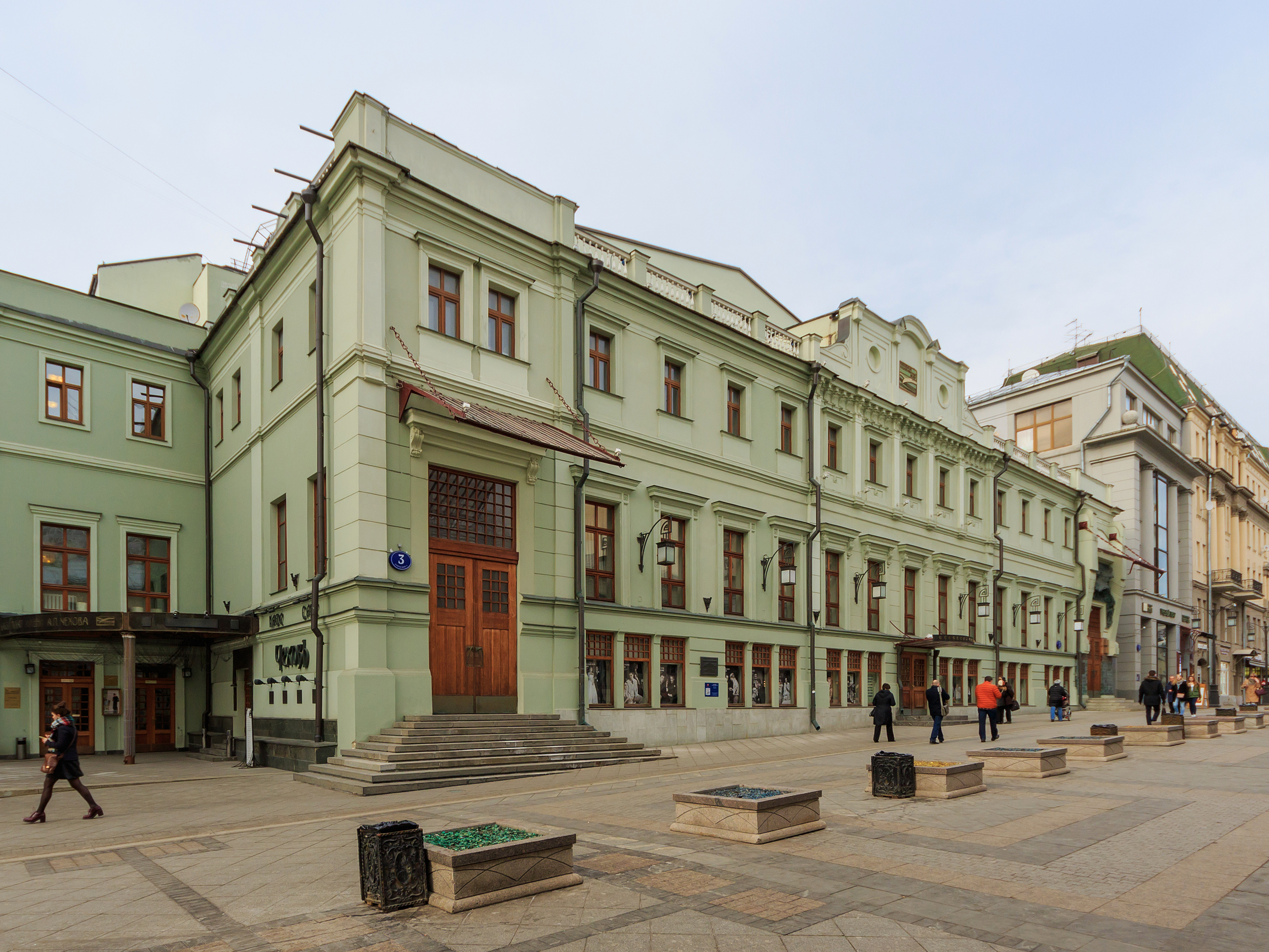
The Moscow Art Theatre

Notable authors who have written dramatic works in the Russian language include:

== Alphabetical list ==
=== A ===
Portrait	Person	Notable works	Illustration	Illustration
	Alexander Ablesimov (1742–1783)	The Miller		
	Alexander Afinogenov (1904–1941)	Fear; Crank; A Far Place		
	Leonid Andreyev (1871–1919)	Anathema; The Life of Man; He Who Gets Slapped	Margalo Gillmore (Consuelo) & Richard Bennett (He) in He Who Gets Slapped, 1922.	Richard Bennett (He, left) & Louis Calvert (Baron Regnart, right) in He Who Gets Slapped, 1922.
	Maria Arbatova (born 1957)	On the Road to Ourselves	Maria Arbatova in 2009	
	Aleksei Arbuzov (1908–1986)	Tanya; A Long Road		
	Mikhail Artsybashev (1878–1927)	War	Artsybashev with the actress Yavorskaya, 1915	Drawing of Artsybashev
	Arkady Averchenko (1881–1925)		Drawing of Averchenko	Averchenko, c. 1920

=== B ===
Portrait	Person	Notable works	Illustration	Illustration
	Isaac Babel (1894–1940)	Maria; Sunset		
	Andrei Bely (1880–1934)	Petersburg; Moscow		
	Pyotr Boborykin (1836–1921)	The Scale	Vera Komissarzhevskaya in The Scale	
	Oleg Bogayev (born 1970)			
	Mikhail Bulgakov (1891–1940)	Flight; Zoyka's Apartment; Adam and Eve; The Days of the Turbins	1926 production of The Days of the Turbins	2011 production of Zoyka's Apartment

=== C ===
Portrait	Person	Notable works	Illustration	Illustration
	Catherine the Great (1729–1796)	Fevey	Portrait of Catherine, 1745	Portrait, 1794
	Nikolai Chayev (1824—1914)	Svat Faddeyich		
	Anton Chekhov (1860–1904)	The Seagull; Uncle Vanya; Three Sisters; The Cherry Orchard	Konstantin Stanislavski as Vershinin in Three Sisters	Chekhov's wife Olga Knipper, who played Madame Ranevskaya in The Cherry Orchard
	Evgeny Chirikov (1864–1932)	The Peasant	At his desk, 1904	Portrait by Repin, 1906
	Ada Chumachenko (1887 – 1954)	The Snow Queen; A Man from the Moon		
	Grand Duke Constantine (1858–1915)	King of Judea	The Grand Duke in military dress, 1891	With his wife Elizaveta, 1894

=== D ===
Portrait	Person	Notable works	Illustration	Illustration
	Grigoriy Demidovtsev (born 1960)		Certificate of membership in the Union of Russian Writers	Demidovtsev in 2007
	Victor Denisov (born 1944)	Six Specters of Lenin on a Piano		V. Denisov and a San Francisco director V.Zavarina, 1994

=== E ===
Portrait	Person	Notable works	Illustration	Illustration
	Nikolai Erdman (1900–1970)	The Mandate; The Suicide		
	Nikolai Evreinov (1879–1953)	A Merry Death; The Chief Thing; The Presentation of Love; The Storming of the Winter Palace	Drawing of Evreinov, 1921	Memorial plaque in Paris

=== F ===
Portrait	Person	Notable works	Illustration	Illustration
	Denis Fonvizin (1744/45–1792)	The Minor	Statue of Fonvizin, part of the Millennium of Russia monument	The Fonvizin Family Coat of Arms
	Olga Forsh (1873–1961)	The Substitute Lecturer		

=== G ===
Portrait	Person	Notable works	Illustration	Illustration
	Alexander Galich (1918–1977)			
	Zinaida Gippius (1869–1945)	The Green Ring	Portrait of Gippius by Ilya Repin, 1894	Portrait by Léon Bakst, 1906
	Nikolai Gogol (1809–1852)	Marriage; The Government Inspector; The Gamblers	Fyodor Paramonov as Anton Antonovich in The Government Inspector	Title page of the first edition of The Government Inspector, 1836
	Dmitry Gorchakov (1758–1824)	King for a Day		
	Grigori Gorin (1940–2000)			
	Maxim Gorky (1868–1936)	The Philistines; The Lower Depths; Summerfolk; Children of the Sun	Konstantin Stanislavski as Satin in The Lower Depths	1905 production of Children of the Sun by the Komissarzhevskaya Theatre
	Aleksandr Griboyedov (1795–1829)	Woe from Wit	Stanislavski as Famusov in Woe from Wit	Title page of Griboyedov's manuscript of Woe from Wit, 1824
	Isabella Grinevskaya (1864–1944)			
	Elena Guro (1887–1913)	The Hurdy-Gurdy	Guro's self-portrait	Elena and Mikhail Matyushin

=== I ===
Portrait	Person	Notable works	Illustration	Illustration
	Vsevolod Ivanov (1895–1963)	Armoured Train 14-69	1927 production of Armoured Train 14-69	

=== K ===
Portrait	Person	Notable works	Illustration	Illustration
	Vasily Kapnist (1758–1823)	Chicane	Postcard featuring Kapnist	
	Valentin Kataev (1897–1986)	Quadrature of the Circle	Kataev's brother, the writer Yevgeni Petrov	
	Pavel Katenin (1792–1853)	Andromache		
	Yevgeny Kharitonov (1941–1981)	Under House Arrest		
	Daniil Kharms (1905–1942)	Elizaveta Bam		Caricature of Kharms by Antonovsky
	Mikhail Kheraskov (1733–1807)			
	Vladimir Kirshon (1902–1938)	Bread; The Miraculous Alloy	Layout of scenery for the play based on the play by V. Kirshon The Court	
	Fyodor Kokoshkin (1775–1838)	Little Demon on Vacation	Kokoshkin's grave at the Donskoy Monastery's necropolis in Moscow	
	Nikolay Kolyada (born 1957)	A Tale About the Dead Tsarina; Oginski Polonaise; Persian Lilac; Playing Forfeits; Slingshot	in the Sverdlovsk Regional Universal Scientific Library Vissarion Belinsky	Kolyada Theater in Yekaterinburg
	Yakov Knyazhnin (1740/42–1791)	Olga; The Cranks; The Braggart; Vadim the Bold		
	Eugene Kozlovsky (born 1946)			
	Valentin Krasnogorov (born 1934)	Let's Have Sex! Pelicans of the Wilderness; The Delights of Adultery; The Dog; The Fall of Don Juan		
	Ivan Krylov (1769–1844)	Philomela; The Cat and the Сook; The Fox and the Crane; The Quartet; The Wolf and the Lamb	Monument to Krylov in St Petersburg	Illustration The Cat and the Сook by Sergei Gribkov
	Nestor Kukolnik (1809–1868)	A Life for the Tsar	Title page from one of Kukolnik's dramas, 1834	Plaque for Kukolnik in Taganrog

=== L ===
Portrait	Person	Notable works	Illustration	Illustration
	Ivan Lazhechnikov (1792–1869)	Oprichnik		
	Leonid Leonov (1899–1994)	Untilovsk		
	Dmitri Lipskerov (born 1964)			
	Lev Lunts (1901–1924)	Native Land		

=== M ===
Portrait	Person	Notable works	Illustration	Illustration
	Anatoly Marienhof (1897–1962)		With the poet Sergei Yesenin, 1915	
	Samuil Marshak (1887–1964)	Smart Things; The Twelve Months	Soviet stamp featuring Marshak	
	Mikhail Matinsky (1760–c. 1820)	Regeneration; Saint-Petersburg's Trade Stalls		
	Vladimir Mayakovsky (1893–1930)	The Bedbug; The Bathhouse; Mystery-Bouffe	A young Mayakovsky	Soviet stamp featuring Mayakovsky
	Sergey Mikhalkov (1913–2009)	Three Plus Two	Mikhailov receiving an award from Vladimir Putin in 2003	Talking with Vladimir Putin in 2003

=== N ===
Portrait	Person	Notable works	Illustration	Illustration
	Vladimir Nabokov (1899–1977)	The Waltz Invention	Nabokov's first published work	
	Löb Nevakhovich (1776/78–1831)			
	Alexander Neverov (1886–1923)	Baba; Hunger	Drawing of Neverov	
	Nikolai Nikolev (1758–1815)			
	Osip Notovich (1849–1914)	Shady Business		

=== O ===
Portrait	Person	Notable works	Illustration	Illustration
	Alexander Ostrovsky (1823–1886)	The Storm; The Poor Bride; Poverty is No Vice; Enough Stupidity in Every Wise Man; The Snow Maiden	Stanislavski (left) and Vasily Kachalov in Enough Stupidity in Every Wise Man	Monument to Osrovsky at the Maly Theatre in Moscow
	Valentin Ovechkin (1904–1968)	A Time to Reap		
	Vladislav Ozerov (1769–1816)	Dmitry Donskoy		

=== P ===
Portrait	Person	Notable works	Illustration	Illustration
	Vera Panova (1905–1973)	Ivan Kosogor; In Old Moscow	Plaque for Panova in St. Petersburg	
	Lyudmila Petrushevskaya (born 1938)		Petrushevskaya in 2009	At a booksigning in New York with Keith Gessen, 2009
	Aleksey Pisemsky (1821–1881)	A Bitter Fate; The Hypochondriac; Lieutenant Gladkov; The Financial Genius	A Bitter Fate. Lizaveta. Picture by Ilya Repin.	Engraving of Pisemsky
	Andrei Platonov (1899–1951)	The Hurdy Gurdy; Fourteen Little Red Huts		
	Pyotr Polevoy (1839–1902)	Princess Sophia		
	Nikolai Pogodin (1900–1962)	Aristocrats		
	Mikhail Popov (1742–1790)	Anyuta		
	Alexander Preys (1905–1942)			
	Iosif Prut (1900–1996)			
	Alexander Pushkin (1799–1837)	Boris Godunov; The Stone Guest; Mozart and Salieri; The Covetous Knight	The Stone Guest. Don Juan and Doña Ana. Picture by Ilya Repin.	

=== R ===
Portrait	Person	Notable works	Illustration	Illustration
	Edvard Radzinsky (born 1936)			
	Vyacheslav Rybakov (born 1954)			

=== S ===
Portrait	Person	Notable works	Illustration	Illustration
	Mikhail Saltykov-Schedrin (1826–1889)	The Death of Pazukhin		
	Natalya Sats (1903–1993)			
	Alexander Shakhovskoy (1777–1846)	Ladies' Joke; The New Stern		
	Shchepkina-Kupernik (1874–1952)	Summer Picture		
	Evgeny Shvarts (1896–1958)	The Dragon		
	Vassily Sigarev (born 1977)	Plasticine; Black Milk		
	Fyodor Sologub (1863–1927)	The Triumph of Death	Portrait by Konstantin Somov	
	Ksenya Stepanycheva (born 1978)	Pink Bow	Stepanycheva in 2009	
	Aleksandr Sukhovo-Kobylin (1817–1903)	Pictures of the Past	Prov Sadovsky as Rasplyuyev in Krechinsky's Wedding (first part of Pictures of the Past).	Cover of the first edition of Pictures of the Past.
	Alexander Sumarokov (1717–1777)	Khorev	Portrait of Sumarokov by Fedor Rokotov.	

=== T ===
Portrait	Person	Notable works	Illustration	Illustration
	Yelizaveta Tarakhovskaya (1891–1968)	By the Pike's Wish	Tarakhovskaya's birth house in Taganrog	
	Modest Tchaikovsky (1850–1916)		Tchaikovsky's brother, the composer Pyotr Tchaikovsky	
	Nadezhda Teffi (1872–1952)	The Woman Question		
	Viktoriya Tokareva (born 1937)			
	Aleksey K. Tolstoy (1817–1875)	The Death of Ivan the Terrible; Tsar Fyodor Ioannovich; Tsar Boris; Don Juan	Ivan the Terrible. Picture by Viktor Vasnetsov.	Tsar Fyodor Ioannovich
	Aleksey N. Tolstoy (1883–1945)		Stamp featuring Tolstoy	
	Leo Tolstoy (1828–1910)	The Power of Darkness; The Fruits of Enlightenment; The Living Corpse	Stanislavski as Zvezdintsev in The Fruits of Enlightenment, 1891	Stanislavski as Prince Abrezhov in The Living Corpse, 1911
	Sergei Tretyakov (1892–1937)	I Want a Baby		
	Ivan Turgenev (1818–1883)	A Provincial Lady; A Month in the Country	Stanislavski and Knipper in A Month in the Country, 1909	A scene from A Month in the Country

=== U ===
Portrait	Person	Notable works	Illustration	Illustration
	Eduard Uspensky (1937–2018)			

=== V ===
Portrait	Person	Notable works	Illustration	Illustration
	Alexander Vampilov (1937–1972)	Elder Son		
	Alexander Vvedensky (1904–1941)	Christmas at the Ivanovs	Vvedensky after arrest in 1941	
	Anastasiya Verbitskaya (1861–1928)	Mirages	Verbitskaya in 1898	
	Vsevolod Vishnevsky (1900–1951)	Optimistic Tragedy		

=== Z ===
Portrait	Person	Notable works	Illustration	Illustration
	Mark Zakharov (1933–2019)		Zakharov with Dmitry Medvedev in 2008	
	Boris Zaytsev (1881–1972)			
	Yevgeny Zamyatin (1884–1937)			
	Aleksey Zhemchuzhnikov (1821–1908)			
	Lydia Zinovieva-Annibal (1866–1907)			
	Rafail Zotov (1795–1871)	Jealous Wife		

== See also ==
- List of Russian-language writers
- List of Russian-language novelists
- List of Russian-language poets
- List of Russian artists
- List of Russian architects
- List of Russian inventors
- List of Russian explorers
- Russian culture
- Russian literature
- Russian language
- Russian culture
