= Amphion (disambiguation) =

Amphion is the name of several characters in Greek mythology.

Amphion may also refer to:

== Ships ==
- Amphion (1778 ship), a pleasure craft owned by Gustav III of Sweden
- Amphion class (disambiguation)
- French ship Amphion (1749)
- HMS Amphion, seven naval vessels
- USS Amphion, two naval vessels

== Other uses ==
- Amphion (horse) (1886–1906), a British Thoroughbred racehorse
- Amphion (moth), a genus of hawk moths
- Amphion (trilobite)
- Amphion (magazine), a Russian literary magazine from 1815 to 1816
- Amphion, Texas
- Amphion Loudspeakers, a Finnish manufacturer of loudspeakers
