= Fyodor Kokoshkin =

Fyodor Kokoshkin may refer to:

- Fyodor Kokoshkin (playwright)
- Fyodor Kokoshkin (politician)
