= Aleksey Merzlyakov =

Russian poet, critic, translator and professor

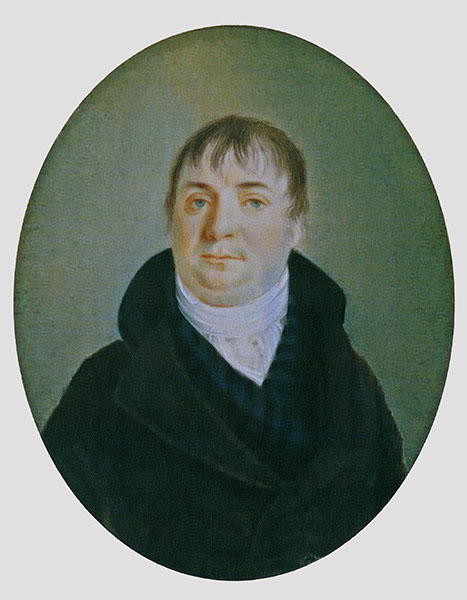
- Born: 22 March 1778; Dalmatovo, Perm Governorate, Russia
- Died: 7 August 1830 (aged 52); Moscow, Russia
- Education: Imperial Moscow University

Aleksey Fyodorovich Merzlyakov (Russian: Алексе́й Фёдорович Мерзляко́в; 22 March 1778 – 7 August 1830) was a Russian poet, critic, translator, and professor.

== Biography ==
Aleksey was born in Dalmatovo, Perm Governorate. He went to Moscow in 1793 to study at Moscow State University, where he would later teach as a professor of poetry. He published his first works in 1794 and contributed to various journals and papers for the rest of his life. He was considered to be a follower of the neo-classical school, but the simplicity and feeling exhibited in his shorter poems gave them lasting popularity. He translated many Greek and Latin works, and the works of Italian poets such as Torquato Tasso and Vittorio Alfieri. In 1815 Merzlyakov launched and became the editor-in-chief of the short-lived but influential Amphion magazine. His in-depth analysis of Kheraskov's Rossiyada (serialized in Nos. 1—3, 5—6 and 8—9), is considered to be the first piece of serious literary criticism in Russia. He died in Moscow in 1830 and is interred in the Vagankovo Cemetery.

The study of Russian literature was introduced into Russian universities largely through the efforts of Merzlyakov. He stated that "literature was the highest achievement of a people, a sign of political and moral successes".
