= Leon Sachs =

Soviet musician (1918–1977)

- Born: Leon Borisovich Sachs; April 20, 1918; Windsor, Canada
- Died: August 20, 1977 (aged 59); Athens, Greece
- Citizenship: Soviet Union
- Education: Moscow Conservatory
- Occupations: Musician; violinist; pedagogue
- Years active: 1937–1977

Leon Borisovich Sachs (April 20, 1918 – August 20, 1977) was a Soviet musician, a virtuoso violinist, one of the leading pedagogues of the Soviet violin school.

== Early life and education ==
Leon Sachs was born into the family of Boris Sachs – a laborer, a metalworker, a native of Riga – and Olga Sachs (maiden name – Reiman) – a housewife, a native of Vinnitsa. Boris and Olga had left Russia for US together with the first wave of emigration – in the end of the 19th century. They have settled in Detroit, where they met and wed. Like most of the young population of Detroit, the Sachs family loved sailing across the Detroit River, crossing to the opposite shore – to the city of Windsor (Canada) (nicknamed "The Rose City" for its parks and rose gardens along the river). One of those boat trips was undertaken by the young couple on an April weekend of 1918. Olga was expecting a child. Having moored to the Canadian shore, she felt unwell and consulted a doctor. Her firstborn son – Leon Sachs – was born on April 20, 1918.

Leon's musical talent became apparent at a young age. At 4 he started taking private violin lessons. The father worked at the Ford Motor Company. Yet the income was not sufficient to pay for Leon's violin tutor. The parents were in constant need, but they did everything possible to afford their son's music lessons. They even tried to hold a small laundromat business, but it went bankrupt. Working at the Ford Factory, Boris Sachs joined the USA Communist Party. In 1925 he responded to Lenin's call to American workers – an appeal to come and participate in the construction projects, helping build the young USSR. Leon was seven years old, when the entire family moved to Soviet Union's capital, where he has finally received a possibility to study music at no charge.

In 1925 he entered the A. and N. Rubinstein Brothers Musical College. Following the instruction of the Commissar of Enlightenment Anatoly Lunacharsky, Leon was given a special stipend for gifted children. Lev Zeitlin – the student and successor of the Russian violin school founder Leopold Auer – became Leon's first violin pedagogue. In 1932 Leon was transferred to a recreated group for precocious children at the Moscow Conservatory.

«Leva Sachs, a young violinist who recently graduated from a special children's music group, gave his first recital on May 16 at the Moscow Conservatory… The first concert showed Sachs as a serious and sufficiently accomplished musician, technically. A natural taste, rhythmic sense, fine finger work are Sachs' best qualities". (Leva Sachs, Young Violinist, Shows Talent. By A. Constant Smith. "Moscow Daily News", May 23, 1935).

In 1937 Leon Sachs was a freshman at the Moscow Conservatory, studying under the distinguished violinist and professor David Oistrakh (himself the student of the legendary violinist-pedagogue Petr Stoliarsky). In that year Leon Sachs participated in the First National USSR Competition of Violinists and became its laureate.

== Career ==
Following his graduation from the conservatory in 1941, Leon Sachs was called up to join the Red Army, during which time he played for three years in the Red Army Central House Symphony Orchestra under the baton of conductors like Lev Steinberg, Oscar Fried, and Kurt Sanderling. In 1944, after his discharge from the army, he was chosen to be the lead violinist in the Operetta Theater Orchestra.

Leon Sachs married pianist Muza Denisova, a student of Gnessin Institute, who later worked as a faculty in the Gnessin Seven-Year School, in 1943. They had two children named Victor and Maria.

=== The Borodin Quartet ===
From 1943 to 1946 Leon Sachs studied at the Moscow Conservatory graduate school under the guidance of Professor D. Oistrakh. The Borodin Quartet was created under the lead of violist Mikhail Teryan in 1944 within the frame of the chamber music class. Leon Sachs was one of the founding members of the group.

=== The Bolshoy Theater ===
From 1945 onwards Sachs worked at the USSR Bolshoy Theater's Symphony Orchestra. And from 1964 until his death on August 20, 1977, he served as its principal violin. "The theater became a new and outermost music school for me" – Sachs used to say. – "The interaction with the leading figures of the conducting art – A. Pazovsky, N. Golovanov, A. Melik-Pashaev, V. Nebolsin, M. Zhukov – taught me to regard musical theater as the top achievement of performance art..." (The "Soviet Artist", November 1970).
Yet L. Sachs has never limited himself to orchestra work. He gave many concerts – both as a soloist and an ensemble performer, he made records. His musical horizons were incredibly wide: from ancient sonatas to the newest pieces of 20th century composers: Stravinsky, Messiaen, Hindemith, Shostakovich, Weinberg...

=== Singularity of musical performance ===
«We've all heard Leon Sachs' solo more than once, but every time one is struck by the unbelievable stability of his playing, the warm, soothing sound, the flawless «sniper» intonation and the high culture of his musical language. Let's thank him for that!» (Fuat Mansurov, the Bolshoy Theater Orchestra's conductor, «The Soviet Artist», November 1970).

=== Pedagogy ===
From 1943 to 1977 – alongside giving numerous concerts – Leon Sachs was constantly teaching. He taught at the Gnessin Ten Year School and the Gnessin Seven Year School, at the Moscow Conservatory College, and at the Gnessin Institute.
He died on August 20, 1977, at the 34th kilometer of the Epidavros-Corinth Road, Greece (during the Bolshoy Theater's participation at the Athens Art Festival). He is buried at the Golovin Cemetery in Moscow together with his wife Muza Denisova.

== Students ==
Grigory Unanian – the soloist of the Russian State Symphony Orchestra of Cinematography (artistic director and principal conductor – Sergey Skripka).
Mihail Rahlevksky – a Russian conductor; the founder and artistic director of the Kremlin Chamber Orchestra.
Andrey Podgorny – artistic director and conductor of the Moscow Chamber Orchestra, founded within the walls of the Gnessin Musical School; a director of the Gnessin Musical School.
Yury Pochekin – A Russian violinist, a famous violin maker. A member of Russia's Violin Makers Union, of the Spanish Association on Professional Violin and Bow Makers, of the European Association of Violin Makers and of the International Artistic Union of Violin and Bow Makers.
Alexander Rukin – an Honoured Artist of the Russian Federation, a violinist, a laureate of international competitions of the "Capriccio Ensemble", a professor of the Rachmaninoff State Conservatory of Rostov.

== Character traits ==
«Leon Sachs was not only a wonderful artist; he was one of the best representatives of the contemporary intelligent and active intelligentsia." ("The Soviet Artist", December 16, 1977).

== Awards ==
In 1951 – in relation with the celebrations of the Bolshoy Theater's 175th birthday – Leon Sachs was awarded an Order of Fame.

== Articles ==
1. (English) "Leva Sachs, Young Violinist, Shows Talent". By A. Constant Smith, "Moscow Daily News", May 23, 1935.
2. (English) "Vies for Honors", "Daily Worker", October 29, 1937, US.
3. (Russian) The Ballet "A Tale of the Stone Flower". A Preliminary Run-Through. By Leon Sachs, "The Soviet Artist", January 6, 1954.
4. (Russian) Concerts in Athens. By Leon Sachs, Orchestra Soloist, Our Special Reporter."The Soviet Artist", May 17, 1963.
5. (Russian) The Orchestra's Principal Violin. Fuat Mansurov, the Bolshoy Theater Orchestra's conductor, "The Soviet Artist", November 1970.
6. (Russian) in the Memory of Leon Borisovich Sachs. The Collective of the USSR Bolshoy Theater, "The Soviet Artist", August 21, 1977.
7. (Russian) L.B. Sachs Commemoration Meeting. At an artistic club. Alexander Ivashkin, the Bolshoy Theater Orchestra's cello player, "The Soviet Artist", December 16, 1977.
8. (Russian) The Model of True Art. Alexander Ivashkin, the Bolshoy Theater Orchestra's cello player, "Soviet Music", № 5, 1978.
9. (Russian) A Striking, Outstanding Personality. "Soviet Music", № 5, 1978.
10. (Russian) A Man of Noble Soul. Petr Tarasevich, the Bolshoy Theater Orchestra's violin player, "The Bolshoy Theater", May 21, 1998.

== Links ==
1. (Russian) The Life and Death of Leon Sachs – The Jewish History Sketchbook.
2. (Russian) Sachs Leon Borisovich – A Memory Wall.
3. (Russian)Victor Denisov – Wikipedia.
4. (Russian) Denisova Muza Nikolaevna – A Biography

== Music ==
1. (Russian) Audio Tracks
P. Tchaikovsky. "The Swan Lake". Pas de Deux from Second Act. Leon Sachs (violin), Yury Loevsky (cello). The Bolshoy Theater Orchestra. Conducted by A. Giuraitis.
P. Tchaikovsky. "The Swan Lake". The Russian Dance. Leon Sachs (violin). The Bolshoy Theater Orchestra. Conducted by A. Giuraitis.
A. Glazunov. The Big Adagio from Act I. Leon Sachs (violin). The Bolshoy Theater Orchestra. Conducted by A. Giuraitis.
B. Asafiev. "The Bakhchisaray Fountain". A Love Song. Leon Sachs (violin), Yury Loevsky (cello), Alexander Sheidin (viola).
The Bolshoy Theater Orchestra. Conducted by A. Giuraitis.
2.

- (Russian) Russian National Library – Search – Results – Electronic catalogue – Page 1. Recording 5.

== Notes ==
«The Third String Quartet" (Grigory Zaborov, 1977) was written in the memory of Leon Sachs. It was first performed in December 1977 in the Beethoven Hall of the Bolshoy Theater (Leon Sachs Commemoration Meeting).
