= Amphion (magazine) =

Russian monthly literary magazine

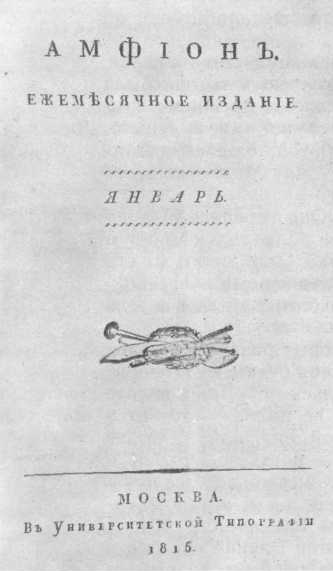
- Editor: Alexey Merzlyakov
- Frequency: Monthly
- First issue: January 1815
- Final issue: January 1816
- Country: Russian Empire
- Based in: Moscow
- Language: Russian

Amphion (Russian: Амфион, pre-1917: Амфiонъ) was a Russian monthly literary magazine published in Moscow in 1815. Prose was but a small part of its output; what prevailed in its pages were odes, fables in verse, elegies and translations of classics like Horace, Titus Livius and Lucian. It was the first Russian magazine where serious critical analysis of poetry, prose, drama and theatre productions started to feature on a regular basis. The central figure in producing Amphion was its editor-in-chief and co-publisher (alongside with S. Smirnov and Fyodor Ivanov), the poet and literary critic Alexey Merzlyakov (who also went down in history as the young Mikhail Lermontov's personal tutor). Merzlyakov's in-depth analysis of Kheraskov's Rossiyada (serialized in Nos. 1–3, 5–6, 8—9), which is considered to be the first work of literary criticism in Russia, had a strong formative influence on Russian literary scene of the time.

The magazine proved to be short-lived—only 12 issues were published—but among the authors whose work appeared there for the first time were Vasily Zhukovsky, Konstantin Batyushkov, Pyotr Vyazemsky, Fyodor Kokoshkin, Denis Davydov and Wilhelm Küchelbecker.
