= Fyodor Kokoshkin (politician) =

Russian lawyer and politician

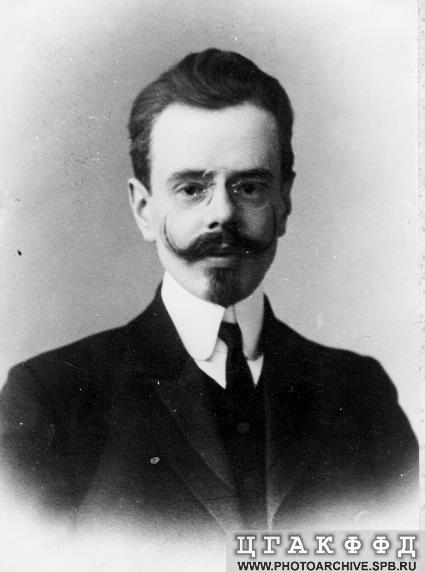
- Born: Fyodor Fyodorovich Kokoshkin; 14 July 1871; Chełm, Lublin Governorate, Russian Empire
- Died: 20 January 1918 (aged 46); Petrograd, Soviet Russia
- Occupations: politician, lawyer, state official

Signature
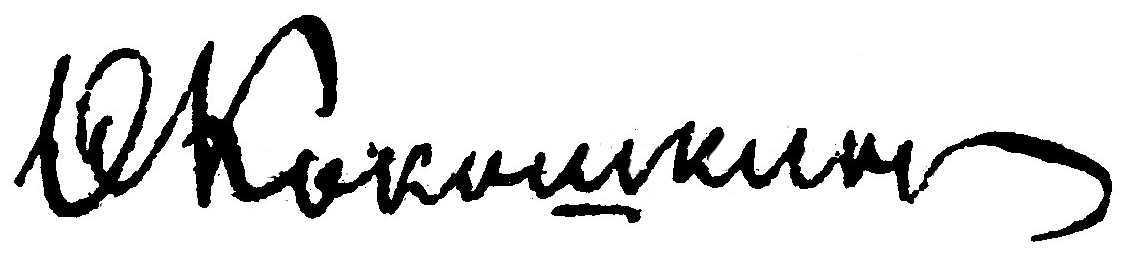

Fyodor Fyodorovich Kokoshkin (Russian: Фёдор Фёдорович Коко́шкин, 14 July [O.S. 1 April] 1871 — 20 January [O.S. 7 January 1918l] 1918) was a Russian lawyer and politician, author of seminal works on jurisprudence, the First Russian State Duma deputy, and a founding member of the Russian Constitutional Democratic Party and the Controller general of the Russian Provisional Government. The playwright Fyodor Kokoshkin was his grandfather.

== Biography ==
Born in Chełm, Lublin Governorate, Congress Poland, to the aristocratic family, Kokoshkin was educated first at the Vladimir Gymnasium which he graduated in 1889 with gold metal, then at the Moscow University where he stayed after the graduation later to become a privat-docent (1897) and professor (1907). In 1911 with a group of liberal-minded lecturers he left the university by way of a protest against the policies of Lev Kasso, the then Minister of Education.

A respected scholar of law, Kokoshkin did a lot to establish the theoretical basis for the proposed development of liberal state ruled by the law, emphasizing the need to limit the possibilities for the state's interference with the personal life of an individual. Among other issues he concentrated on in his essays were the decentralization of power, autonomy and federalism, as well as theoretical and practical ways of organizing local governments for Russian provinces.

Kokoshkin's political career started in 1897 when he was elected a glasny for the Zvenigorod local government. In 1900 he joined the Moscow Governorate offices, and was for a while the head of its economy department. He was also the deputy to Sergey Muromtsev, then the secretary of the Moscow City Duma.

Starting with 1903, Kokoshkin became more and more involved with the liberal politics. He joined several legal or semi-legal groups, like Beseda (Soliloquy), The Union of Local Constitutionalists and the Union of Liberation, and earned a reputation as a brilliant speaker, as well as an activist of the zemstvo movement in mid-1900s, which he provided a vast organizational work for. Kokoshkin became one of the founding members of the Constitutional Democratic Party, which he had also been a co-founder of.

In 1906 he was elected for the First Russian State Duma, and became its vice-secretary. Arguably his most notable achievement there was law project regulating the principles for the equality of all citizens and the respect for civil right, backed by 151 fellow Duma members.

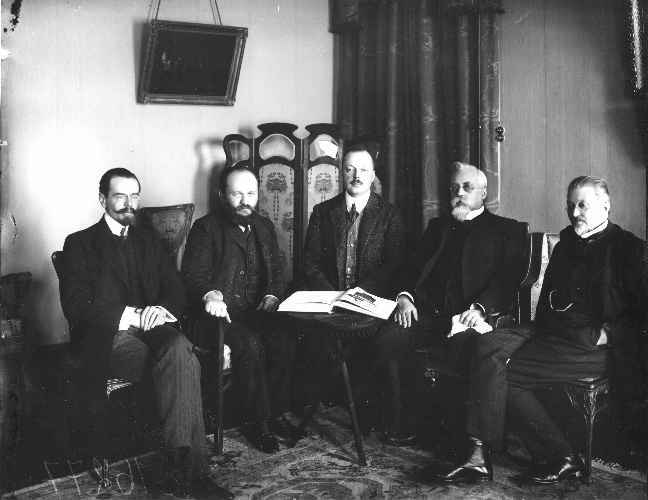
Left to right: Fyodor Kokoshkin, Maksim Vinaver, Vladimir Dmitrievich Nabokov, the Duma Chairman Sergey Muromtsev, Ivan Petrunkevich. December 1907

After the 1907 dissolution of the Russian Duma, Kokoshkin co-authored and signed the Vyborg Manifesto, which he was promptly arrested for to spend three months in prison. As all other signatories of the document he was stripped of the right to ballot for the State Duma. Also that year, alongside several other members of the Kadet Party he was expelled from the Moscow Dvoryanstvo Assembly.

Starting with 1907, Kokoshkin became an active member of the stuff of Russkiye Vedomosti, where he regularly published articles on a wide range of subjects, including parliamentarism, national identity, the situation around the Old Believers. He was the Kadet Party's leading expert on the issues of the state law and national politics.

After the 1917 February Revolution Kokoshkin became the chairman of the Provisional Government's Juridical Council and a First Department senator. He was elected chairman of the special committee for preparing the project for the procedures of the election to the Constituent assembly. In the second coalitional Provisional Government of July–August 1917, he was the State Controller and the leader of the Kadet fraction.

After the Bolsheviks took power Kokoshkin became actively involved in preparations for the Constituent assembly elections, speaking at rallies and meetings. Elected as a member of the Assembly, on 10 December 1917 he arrived at Petrograd in order to make speech at the opening meeting which was supposed to take place on 11 December. To the friends who tried to dissuade him from going, he replied: "I just cannot fail to come to where the people who elected me had sent me. This would have been to betray the cause I devoted all my life to."

=== Death ===
Upon the arrival he was arrested by the Bolsheviks, warrants issued by the Petrograd Military Revolutionary Committee, as one of the leaders of "the party of enemies of the people" and was imprisoned in the Peter and Paul Fortress.

Suffering form tuberculosis, on 6 January 1918 he was transferred, along with his fellow Kadet Andrey Shingaryov, to the Mariinskaya Hospital. The following night both were murdered by a group of Baltic sailors, who broke into the hospital. "...And then 'they' came and killed him. Led by the soldier Basov, the one who took the money from me and who said he was going upstairs just to change guards... Some sailors stayed on the staircase, others went into the ward, killed Kokoshkin and instantly left. Nurses, frightened to death, knew not what to do. Other patients woke up and cried for help. Some ran downstairs and told the janitor... But at night the telephone line did not work. It was only in the morning, at 9, that they managed to inform Sofia Panina," Shingaryov's sister Alexandra Ivanovna remembered.

The Ministry of Justice later revealed that Basov justified the murder on the grounds that there would be 'two less bourgeois mouths to feed'. Basov was later brought to trial and convicted, but none of the murderers was ever caught and the Bolshevik leaders, who at first condemned the murders, later sought to justify them as an act of political terror.
