= Valentin Krasnogorov =

Russian-Israeli playwright and writer (born 1934)

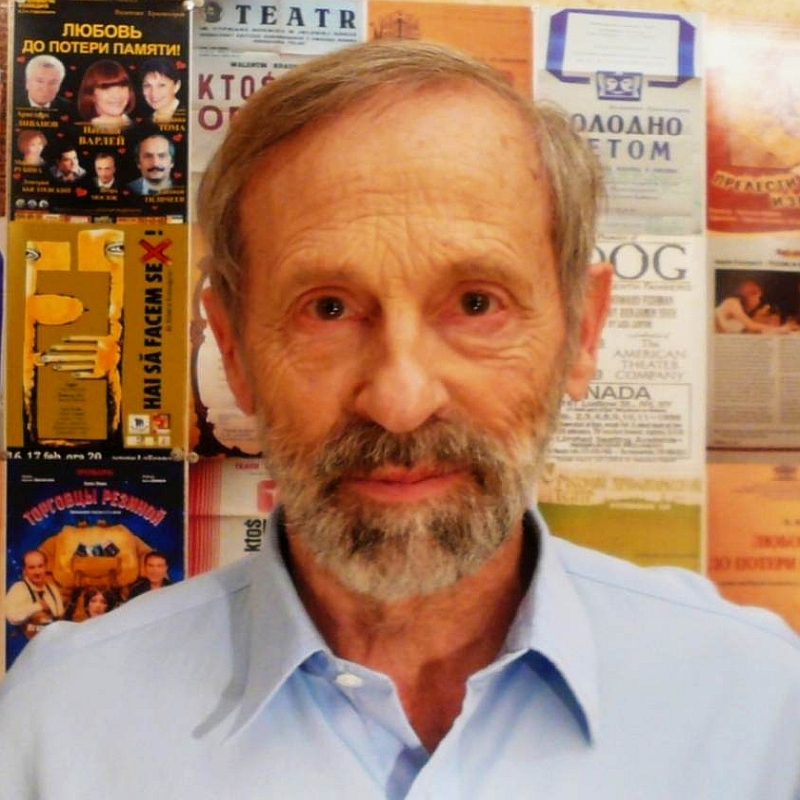
- Born: 20 December 1934 (age 91); Leningrad, now St. Petersburg, Russia
- Occupations: Playwright, writer
- Writing career
- Period: 1976-2026
- Notable works: "Premiere After-Party", Let's Have Sex; The Dog
- Notable awards: Volodin Prize
- Website: http://krasnogorov.com/

Valentin Krasnogorov (Russian: Валентин Красногоров, which is a pseudonym, his real name being Valentin Samuilovich Faynberg (Валентин Самуилович Файнберг); born 20 December 1934, Leningrad, now St. Petersburg, is a Russian-Israeli playwright, novelist, screenwriter, dramatic theorist, chemical engineer, Doctor of Technical Sciences, and public figure.

== Biography and literature work ==
Born 20 December 1934, in Leningrad, he studied in Estonia. He graduated from the Tallinn Polytechnic Institute. His first play, "A Real Man," was staged in 1976 in St. Petersburg. . Krasnogorov's plays, including "The Bride's Room," "Someone Must Go," "Knightly Passions," "The Delights of Adultery", "Love Until You Lose Your Memory," "Everyone Has Their Own Star," "Today or Never," "Let's Have Sex!", "Wednesday Dates," and others, have been produced in over 700 professional theaters in Russia and many foreign countries. Such directors as Georgy Tovstonogov, Lev Dodin, Roman Viktyuk, and Vladimir Andreyev have worked on productions of his plays. Krasnogorov is also a dramatic theorist, prose writer, and publicist, author of books, novellas, short stories, and essays published in various publications. He is the author of over 70 plays, numerous books and articles on drama and theater, including "Standing on Guard at Thought" on the history of Russian and Soviet censorship, and "Nature – Man – Landscape: The Meaning and Content of Landscape Painting." His books "Fundamentals of Drama: Theory, Technique, and Practice of Drama" and "Four Walls and One Passion" have earned high praise from theater professionals. Krasnogorov's plays have also been produced by over 1100 amateur, youth, and student theaters. They have been translated into 32 languages, as well as into many languages of the peoples of Russia.

Valentin Krasnogorov is a member of the Union of Russian Writers (URW) and the Union of Theatre Workers of Russia (STD RF). He is the founder of the Guild of Playwrights of St. Petersburg.

Valentin Krasnogorov is a Doctor of Technical Sciences, the author of four monographs, numerous patents, and over 100 scientific publications on chemical engineering. From 1991 to 2005, he lived in Israel, and from 1998 to 2003, he served as Deputy Mayor of Haifa.[3] Krasnogorov's theatre pieces are written in different genres: comedies and tragedies, biting satire, grotesque, absurd, and lyricism.

== Plays ==
=== Staged plays translated into English ===
1. Delights of Adultery (a theater triptych consisting of 3 short plays)
2. Easy Acquaintance
3. Ladies by Ad
4. Let’s Have Sex!
5. Pelicans of the wilderness (a short play)
6. Premiere After Party
7. Robbery in Broad Daylight
8. The Cruel Lesson
9. The Dog (Tragedy)
10. The Fall Of Don Juan
11. The Lot
12. The Love to Distraction
13. The Road Thereto, From Where There Is No Road
14. Three Stars and Three Chairs
15. Vineyard
16. Visit of a Young Lady (a short play)

=== Staged plays in Russian ===
1. A Night in the Hotel
2. Gates of Paradise
3. Immodest Desires
4. Love Medicine
5. Now or Never
6. Several Hours in the Life of a Man and a Woman
7. Small Tragedies
8. Song of Songs
9. That Weak, Gentle Sex
10. The Bride's Room
11. The Fair Show
12. The Legs of Woman Number Two
13. Rendezvous on Wednesdays
14. Women by the ad
15. Theatrical Comedy

== Productions ==
V. Krasnogorov's plays have been staged in professional, amateur, and student theaters in Russia, Australia, Albania, England, Armenia, Belarus, Bulgaria, Germany, India, Iran, Kazakhstan, Cyprus, Korea (South), Latvia, Lithuania, Macedonia, Moldova, Mongolia, Poland, Romania, Serbia, Slovakia, the USA, Turkey, Ukraine, the Czech Republic, Montenegro, Estonia, and elsewhere. (1,772 productions as of October 2026)

== Filmography ==
1. That Woman in the Window [7] 1991. [1] Dir. L. Eidlin. Adaptation of the play "Everyone Has His Own Star."
2. Anatomy of Betrayal 2017. Dir. N. Dreiden (based on plays from the cycle "The Delights of Adultery").
3. Hotel. 2021. Dir. A. Baluev (based on the play "His Don Juan List").
4. Ideal Wife. 2021. Dir. A. Grachev. Screenplay.
5. Easy Dating. 2021. Dir. A. Krestnikov. Screenplay.

== Published books ==
1. Theatre. T. 1,2. Bérénice édition Nouvelles. Paris 2026. 290 et 250 pp. Vol 1. ISBN 978-2-487377-17-2 vol 2. ISBN 978-2-487377-16-5
2. Природа-Человек-Пейзаж. Ridero, 2023. 360 c. ISBN 978-5-0060-7065-3
3. Основы драматургии. Теория, техника и практика драмы. ЭКСМО, 2022. 432 с. ISBN 9785041898350
4. О драме и театре. «Директ-Медиа», М., Берлин, 2018. 214 с. ISBN 978-5-4475-9295-0
5. У мысли стоя на часах (История русской и советской цензуры), изд. «Прометей». Москва. 2017. ISBN 978-5-906879-86-8
6. اتاق عروس (Room of the Bride; Female Share; en Farsi), 2017. ISBN 97860078069061
7. Свидания по средам». (Пьесы, том 2). С.-Петербург, Издательство «Написано пером», 2015. ISBN 978-5-00071-196-5
8. Комната невесты». (Пьесы, том 3). С.-Петербург, Издательство «Написано пером», 2015. ISBN 978-5-00071-197-2
9. Фуршет после премьеры. Пьесы, т.1.» Издательство «Написано пером»СПБ, 2013. ISBN 978-5-9904910-1-4
10. LET’S HAVE SEX! Norman Maine Publishing, Tallevast, 2002. 62 p.
11. Четыре стены и одна страсть. Книга о поэтике (теории) драмы. Luk Publishers, Jerusalem, 2001. С128 ISBN 978-965-222-786-7
12. ЮСТУС ЛИБИХ. Изд. «Знание», М. 1980. 144 С.
13. Прелести измены, «Luk Publishers”, 1997. Сборник пьес. ISBN 978-965-222-787-4
14. Подражающие молниям. Изд. «Знание», М. 1977. Научно-художественная история взрывчатых веществ.
15. Настоящий мужчина. Изд. Искусство, Л. 1977. 64 c.

== Plays and papers about drama and theater ==
1. «Ничего невозможного», Фантастический рассказ. Журнал «Химия и жизнь», 1974, № 10, с. 112.
2. Пьеса «Настоящий мужчина». Изд. «Искусство», Л., 1977.
3. Пьеса «Кто-то должен уйти». В сб. «Сквозное действие», Л. 1989, с. 176-228.
4. «Гласность и безгласность». История русской и советской цензуры. Журнал 10. «Нева», 1990, № 3, с. 146-165.
5. «Туалет жены доцента», повесть. Журнал «22», № 93, 1994, с.3-60.
6. «Торговцы резиной» (перевод с иврита пьесы Х. Левина). Журнал «22», № 103, 1997, с.3-59
7. «Треугольные булочки». Журнал «22», № 93, 1999, с.59-104
8. Пьеса «Жребий ». В сб. «Кармель литературный», Хайфа, 1999, с. 67-74.
9. Рассказы («Препарат-3», «Случай из жизни», «Орест и Пилад», «Выбор», «Крысы», «Тайна по-израильски»). В сб. «Из будущих книг». Хайфа, 1999, с. 195-218
10. Пьеса «Давай займемся сексом!» Журнал «22», № 123, 2002, с.59-104
11. «Выбор», фантастический рассказ. Журнал «Галилея», № 7, 2003.
12. Пьеса «Собака» הבלב (на иврите), 2003 Иерусалим, 2003.
13. «Альфред Нобель – легенды и реальность». Художественный очерк. Журнал «Звезда», 2003, № 10, с 125-160.
14. Пьеса «Сегодня или никогда» (»Шествие гномов»). Журнал «Современная драматургия», 2003, № 2.
15. Пьеса «Let’s have sex!” Norman Maine Publishing, USA, 2005
16. . Статья "Холодное лето 1985-го". Альманах "Балтийские сезоны", №11, с. 125-130. 2006. Пьеса «Свидания по средам». Журнал «Современная драматургия», 2006, № 3.
17. Пьеса «Лебединая песня". Альманах "Балтийские сезоны", №14, с. 125-144. 2006
18. Пьеса «Нескромные желания». Журнал «Современная драматургия», 2008, № 1.
19. Статья " Они любить умеют только мертвых...". «Современная драматургия», 2007, № 2, с. 197-198. Об отношении театров к постановке современных пьес.
20. Статья "Драматург и театр". «Петербургский театральный журнал», 2008, № 1 (51), с. 114-116. О взаимоотношениях театра и драматурга.
21. Пьеса «Фуршет после премьеры». Журнал «22», 2008, № 148.
22. Статья "Театр, драматург, закон". «Современная драматургия», 2008, № 3, с. 197-198. Правовые аспекты отношений театров с авторами.
23. Статья "Еще раз про любовь". «Современная драматургия», 2009, № 3,. О том, почему театры хотят ставить классику.
24. «Объяснение в трамвае», подборка стихов. Журнал «22», 2009, № 153
25. Пьеса «Легкое знакомство». «Современная драматургия», 2010, № 3
26. Пьеса Его донжуанский список . Альманах «Балтийские сезоны», 2010, № 20.
27. Пьеса «Комната невесты«. Современная драматургия», 2012, № 1.
28. Статья «Гильдии драматургов – у нас и за рубежом. «.Современная драматургия», 2012, № 4.
29. Статья «Любители и авторы«. Бюллетень РАО «Авторы и пьесы», вып. 41, апрель 2013. О соблюдении любительскими театрами законов об авторском праве.
30. Статья «Режиссерское право». «Страстной бульвар» , № 9-159, июнь 2013. О соблюдении режиссерами права драматурга на неприкосновенность произведения.
31. Статья «Групповое изнасилование классики» или «Существует ли современная драматургия?» «Литературная газета» № 41 (6434) (16-10-2013)
32. Пьеса для кукольного театра «Страшный разбойник». В сборнике "Драматурги Санкт-Петербурга - детям". М., 2013.
33. Hai sa facem sex! («Давай займемся сексом!»). В сборнике «TEATRU RUSECS DE AZI», Bucharest, 2013 (на румынском языке). ISBN 978-973-8129-61-0
34. Пьесы «Дорога туда, откуда нет дороги» и «Любовь до потери памяти». В сборнике пьес петербургских драматургов «Гармония в теплых тонах». СПБ, 2014.
35. Пьеса «Жестокий урок». В сборнике "Молодежный театр", М. 2014.
36. Эссе "Парадокс об актере". Журнал «Современная драматургия, № 2, 2016, сс. 195-197.
37. Пьеса «Любовь до потери памяти». Журнал «Поляна», №2 (16), 2016, сс. 6-55.
38. Пьеса «Женщины по объявлению». «Современная драматургия», 2016, № 4
39. «Холодное, жестокое, но милое детство» (Отрывок из воспоминаний). В сб. "Такая разная война: Великая Отечественная война в воспоминаниях, письмах, рассказах». СПб. 2017. ISPN 9785905042607
40. Статья «Поэтика драмы», журнал «Вопросы литературы», №4, 2017, стр. 20
41. Krasnogorov, V.. 瓦伦丁·克拉斯诺戈罗夫. “After Premiere Party. 首演欢庆”. translated by Y. Zhai 翟延平and Z. Qiao 乔宗玉. Shanghai Theatre. 上海戏剧, 2022, (5): 38-63.
42. Krasnogorov, V.. 瓦伦丁·克拉斯诺戈罗夫. “Staging Hamlet. 排演《哈姆莱特》”. translated by Y. Zhai 翟延平and Z. Qiao 乔宗玉. Play Monthly. 剧本, 2022, (9): 84-95.
43. Krasnogorov, V.. 柯伦迪. “Delights of Adultery. 巫山云雨”. translated by Y. Zhai 翟延平and Z. Qiao 乔宗玉. New Drama. 新剧本, 2022, (5): 96-116.
44. Krasnogorov, V.. 柯伦迪. “Ladies by Ad. 招蜂引蝶”. translated by Y. Zhai 翟延平and Z. Qiao 乔宗玉. Playwright. 剧作家, 2023, (2): 16-41.
45. Krasnogorov, V.. 柯伦迪. “Love till Memory Lost . 失忆前的爱当她遇到她” . translated by Y. Zhai 翟延平and Z. Qiao 乔宗玉. Yingju Xinzuo. 影剧新作, 2023, (3): 99-120.
46. Krasnogorov, V.. 柯伦迪. “ Terrible Robber. 可怕的强盗”. translated by Y. Zhai 翟延平and Z. Qiao 乔宗玉. The Grand Stage. 大舞台, 2023, (1): 59-66.
47. Krasnogorov, V.. 柯伦迪. “The Toilet of Associate Professor’s Wife. 副教授夫人的卫生间”. translated by Y. Zhai 翟延平and Z. Qiao 乔宗玉. Dianchi. 滇池, 2023, (8): 112-128.
48. Krasnogorov, V.. 柯伦迪. “When She Meets Her (“Two women”). 当她遇到她” . translated by Y. Zhai 翟延平and Z. Qiao 乔宗玉. Yihai. 艺海, 2023, (6): p.p. 3-21.
49. Krasnogorov, V.. 柯伦迪. “A True Man. 堂堂正正的人”. translated by Y. Zhai 翟延平and Z. Qiao 乔宗玉. Playwright.剧作家, 2024, (1): 26-49.
50. Krasnogorov, V.. 柯伦迪. “The Dog. 狗”. translated by Y. Zhai 翟延平and Z. Qiao 乔宗玉. New Drama. 新剧本, 2024, (1): 96-120.
51. Krasnogorov, V.. 柯伦迪. “The Fall of Don Juan. 唐璜的降临”. translated by Y. Zhai 翟延平and Z. Qiao 乔宗玉. New Drama. 新剧本, 2026, (2): 94-127.
52. Krasnogorov, V.. 柯伦迪. “On the Essence of Drama. 谈谈戏剧的本质”. translated by Y. Zhai 翟延平and Z. Qiao 乔宗玉. Fujian Theatre. 剧谈, 2026, (6): 77-85.
