= Victor Denisov =

Victor L. Denisov
- Born: Victor Denisov; 17 January 1944; Moscow, USSR
- Occupation: Russian playwright. The author of 33 plays.

Victor L. Denisov (Victor Leonovich Denisov) (17 January 1944, Moscow, USSR) is a Russian playwright. He is the author of 33 plays and is known for depicting reality in forms and displays that are not typical to the Russian theatre. He is a member of the Moscow Writers Union (1995) and of the Theater Workers Union of the Russian Federation and a specialist in American 20th century drama. He translated more than 20 plays from English, as well as of novels, novellas, short stories and essays. He received a PhD in philology (1982).

== Biography ==
=== Parents ===
Victor Denisov was born on 17 January 1944 in Moscow to a family of classical musicians. The father Leon Sachs (20 April 1918–20 August 1977) was a Soviet musician, a virtuoso violinist, the principal violin of the Bolshoy Theater Symphony Orchestra, one of the leading pedagogues of the Soviet violin school.
The mother Muza Denisova (8 August 1922– 23 October 2003) was a Soviet piano pedagogue and a pianist. She was one of the leading pedagogues of the Gnessin Seven Year School.

=== Early years ===
When Denisov turned seven, he started studying the violin art from his father Leon Sachs at the Gnessin Seven Year School. When 11, he performed on the stage of the conservatory's Smaller Chamber Hall amongst other gifted students. After four years of instruction, Victor has abandoned his music studies against the will of his parents. In the last years of middle school he became infatuated with jazz: he played the French horn and then the trumpet at the Loktev Song and Dance Ensemble. However, V. Denisov had no desire to become a musician. From little up, he was attracted by letters, not by sounds.

The love of theater was a legacy from his father. L.Sachs came to the Bolshoy as a violin soloist, worked there for 32 years and never stopped admiring its festivity and grandeur. His son followed him along to rehearsals and performances since early childhood. At the age of five, impressed by Mikhail Glinka's opera «Ruslan and Lyudmila» Victor Denisov has first endeavored to write a play. It was called «Khalvin and Khalvitsa».

Victor's maternal grandfather Nikolay Denisov has been a descendant of an aristocratic family, a graduate of the Lomonosov Moscow State University's medical department, a military doctor and a big admirer of theater. On Christmas he often entertained domestic performances and himself participated in them. When a high school senior, V. Denisov has also performed on the stage – he played the Baron in Maxim Gorky's «The Lower Depths» (in a school production) and even considered applying to an acting school. Yet the thirst for words took the upper hand, and in 1962 (just like his grandfather) he entered the philological department of the Lomonosov Moscow State University (MGU).

=== Career ===
In 1967 Denisov graduated from MGU having majored in the three following disciplines: Russian as a foreign language, English and foreign literature. From 1967 to 1968 he worked as a reader at the Intourist – the only foreign tourist organization in the USSR of the 60s. From 1968 to 1970 he taught Russian as a foreign language at the preparatory department of MGU, and from 1970 to 1975 – at the Russian department of Patrice Lumumba Peoples' Friendship University. From 1977 to 1982 Denisov lectured on foreign literature at the Maurice Thorez Moscow State Pedagogical Institute of Foreign Languages.

From 1978 to 1990 Denisov served as a literary consultant, a senior academic editor of the Progress Publishers – Soviet Union's main publishing house for literature in foreign languages. Denisov was in charge of studying and analyzing the Anglophone book market abroad; he selected books for purchase and wrote reviews for books published by Penguin Books, Pan Books, Granada Publishing and the Scottish printing company William Collins, Sons. It was thanks to V. Denisov's involvement that the Russian book market first saw the original works of Samuel Beckett, Saul Bellow, Ray Bradbury, Anthony Burgess, Graham Greene, Aldous Huxley, James Joyce, D. H. Lawrence, Somerset Maugham, George Orwell, J. B. Priestley, Peter Ustinov, Gore Vidal, Kurt Vonnegut, Evelyn Waugh, Oscar Wilde, Tennessee Williams and many others.
From 1992 to 1996 Denisov worked as the literary director assistant at the «Laboratory» Drama Theater (Moscow). From 1997 to 1999 he served as the deputy of the Theater Messenger's editor-in-chief.
From 2002 onwards Victor Denisov is engaged exclusively in the writing of plays.

== Creative work ==
In 1968 Denisov wrote his first play – «Terrarium». The experience of working at the Intourist and the aftermath of the Prague Spring of 1968 served as the creative impetus. The play's form is a dramaturgic fantasy, in which an employee of a tourist firm is eaten by her colleagues and the firm's president under a dressing; yet, in essence, the play is a theatrical satire on the Soviet reality. The author took arms against the falsehood, hypocrisy and dogmas, which invaded life and art with the beginning of Leonid Brezhnev's reign at the end of the Khrushchev «thaw». One of the playwright's targets was one of social realism's main postulates – the «positive hero of our times». The hero of «Terrarium» is not even a human being, but a newt.

The next plays by V. Denisov are also «dedicated» to the Soviet period: «Paint the Roses in Red», «Guards on the Dam», «The Clown», «The Stray Streetcar»; the play «Skiers» is dedicated to the Perestroika period. Several generations of Russian intelligentsia of the second half of the 20th century and the beginning of the 21st century became the protagonists of the plays «When the Saints Go Marching In», «Invited to the Feast», «See You Later, Alligator», «Heller in Pink Tights», «Christmas Eve» and others.

In 1987 Victor Denisov's debut as a playwright took place on the Moscow stage. It was the third year of Perestroika – the theater was in need of a new theatrical language. The Moscow New Drama Theater commissioned the staging of the American play «All in the Garden» (V. Denisov was supposed to provide its new translation). Yet the director Petr Stein, invited from the Lenin Komsomol Moscow Theater, had decided to make the stage adaptation of the play by Giles Cooper and Edward Albee in the spirit of the recent changes in Russia. And so V. Denisov's sharp and loud «The Garden Feast» was born – a tragical farce on the ruinous power of money that pushes people to lechery and crime.

The Chief Administration of Culture had shut the performance down, claiming it defamed the moral principles of the Soviet man. Luckily, many influential cultural figures have stood up for the performance: the critics Boris Lyubimov, Mikhail Shvydkoi, the poet and journalist of the Moscow Komsomol newspaper Alexander Aronov, the actress Natalia Varley, the artists of the Lenin Komsomol Moscow Theater – Oleg Yankovsky, Alexander Abdulov, Irina Alferova, and its artistic director Mark Zakharov. «The Garden Party» was resurrected and performed on the stage of the New Dramatic Moscow Theater until 1989, enjoying full houses in every performance.

In 1989 V. Denisov wrote the shortest Russian play ever – «Primum Agere» («Act!») – slightly more than half a page of text – a «happening» scenario on the unpredictable paths of Russia's possible development. This play entered V. Denisov's first collection of original plays «Six Specters of Lenin on a Piano», published in 1998. Five years earlier, in 1993, the play «Six Specters of Lenin on a Piano», dedicated to Russia's tragic fate in the 20th century, was staged at the «Laboratory» Drama Theater (Moscow) by its artistic director Andrey Rossinsky. The known theater critic John Freedman has commented upon the apparent paradoxes of the play: «The trick is that no one hits too hard on the obvious metaphors of Lenin-as-insect or the intellectual as his own worst enemy… And if there is a message to be gleaned from it all, it's one of reconciliation. As if author Denisov were saying, «Hey, my heritage may be baffling. But it's mine. All of it!» (A Bold, New Playwright Tackles Dalí, Lenin. By John Freedman. The Moscow Times, Thursday, 16 September 1993). «Six Specters…» is the first of V. Denisov's dramatic trilogy «20th Century Tyrants». The second play of the trilogy – «Scared as of Bin Laden» – touches upon international terrorism – the disease of the 21st century. The third – «Shall We Resurrect Karabas?» – examines the relationship of tyrant and victim.

In 1996 the prominent Russian director Roman Viktiuk proposed to Denisov to create a Russian scenic version of Billy Wilder's cult American movie Sunset Boulevard. The premiere of Victor Denisov's melodrama «Sunset Boulevard» took place at the Russian Theater of Estonia (Tallinn) in 1998. The part of the silent cinema star Norma Desmond was played by the Soviet and Ukrainian stage and film actress Ada Rogovtseva. The performance has toured in the Baltic Countries, Russia, Ukraine, Israel and USA.

The craft of playwriting combined with academic education makes Denisov's translations of plays easily «speakable», not requiring a scenic adaptation. V. Denisov was the first in Russia to translate Tennessee Williams' «Camino Real», «Period of Adjustment», «The Lady of Larkspur Lotion»; Harold Pinter's «The Lover»,«The Homecoming»; Arthur Miller's «Creation of the World and Other Business», Edward Albee's «American Dream».

Performances based on V. Denisov's plays and translations have featured such actors as Liya Akhedzhakovа, Victor Gvozditsky, Vyacheslav Grishechkin, Alexander Dzyuba, Valery Zadonsky, Alexander Ivashkevich, Kirill Kozakov, Sergey Makovetsky, Boris Nevzorov, Andrey Nevraev, Lyubov Novak, Lyudmila Odiyankova, Evgeny Paperny, Dmitry Pisarenko, Alexander Rezalin, Evgeniya Simonova, Vladimir Shevyakov and other known Russian stage and film actors.

In November 2011 the oldest artist of the famed Russian stage, a «Vakhtangovian» Vladimir Etush performed the role of Gregory Solomon in an excerpt of Arthur Miller's «The Price» (translated by V. Denisov) in a jubilee performance dedicated to the 90th anniversary of the Vakhtangov Theater (artistic director – Rimas Tuminas).

From 1974 to 2001 Denisov wrote around 500 articles on the issues of contemporary theater, drama, literature and art. He was published in the «Contemporary Drama» almanac, the magazines «Theatrical Life», «Contemporary Fiction Abroad», «Social Sciences Abroad», in the «Prompter» foreign drama magazine, the biweeklies «Screen and Stage», «Arguments and Facts», in the «Public Thought Abroad» book review, in the «Independent Newspaper», in the newspapers «Evening Moscow», «The Evening Club», «The Moscow Pravda» («The Moscow Truth»), «The Theatrical Messenger», and in the theatrical newspaper «Doctor Chekhov» and «Little Madame» («Sudarushka»).

=== Singularities of dramatic work ===
«I'm quite far away from staging my entire life – that would be too conceited. But practically everything that I've written did take place in reality; plus imagination, of course, if not that – I would be a realist – and that's not my thing at all.» (V. Denisov «The Playwright's Address to the Audience». The theater programme of the serious comedy «See you Later, Alligator» in the M.Rudomino Library for Foreign Literature, 2009, Moscow.)

Denisov is known for experimenting with form. He works on the verge of several genres, widely utilizing the metaphor. The foundation of a Victor Denisov play is an original idea, an entertaining plot and the unpredictability of denouement. Denisov attributes much importance to the role of music in a dramatic performance. Laughter is oftentimes one of the protagonists in many of his plays.

«Denisov can write clever dialogue and has a nice flair for situation and characterization. That's no mean feat». (From: Moscow Performances. The New Russian Theater 1991–1996 (page 57). By John Freedman. Harwood Academic Publishers, 1997.

Denisov considers Nikolay Gogol, Mikhail Saltykov-Schedrin and Evgeny Shvartz to be his playwriting teachers. He has also learned the professional craft from Edward Albee and Eugène Ionesco.

=== Participation in festivals ===
The 1st International Festival of Young Drama «Lyubimovka-92» (When the Saints Go Marching In), The 1st International Drama Festival of the Alexander S.Onassis Public Benefit Foundation «Athens-2002» (Her Majesty's Diamonds).

=== Academic work ===
The Philosophical Quest of Jerome David Salinger. (The first publication of the student Victor Denisov). Abstracts of Presentations by Young Academics at an MGU Academic Conference. Moscow: MGU Publishing House,1968.
PhD Thesis. «Romantic Foundations of T. Williams' Method. (The Singularity of Conflict in the Playwright's Works)». Moscow, 1982.

== Family ==
Married to Elena Stepanova – philologist, theater critic, pedagogue.
Children: Rufina (born 1977.), journalist; Margarita (born 1988), architect.

== Bibliography ==
=== Original plays ===
1. «Terrarium» (a fantastic fairy-tale without a hint at anything that ever existed anywhere or anytime with prologue, dialogue, monologue and epilogue). 1968
2. «Aegeus and Theseus» (an antique tragedy in twelve episodes). 1977
3. «Guards on the Dam» (a grotesque in 4 scenes). 1981, 2010
4. «Skiers» (a one-act parabola). 1989
5. «Primum Agere» («Act!») (a happening). 1989, 2012
6. «When the Saints Go Marching In» (a two-act farcical parable). 1990, 2010
7. «Love of One's Native Hearth» (a one-act unhistorical comical drama). 1991
8. «Six Specters of Lenin on a Piano» (somewhat of a hallucination based on Salvador Dalí's painting of the same name). 1993
9. «The Christmas Star» (a miracle play for children and adults in five scenes). 1995
10. «Invited to the Feast» (a one-act metaphysical drama). 1996
11. «English According to Shakespeare's Method» (joking with the classic in two acts with one intermission). 1998, 2011
12. «The Clown» (a dramatic buffoonery in eight gags). 1999
13. «The Stray Streetcar» (a one-act anti-mystery play on the Soviet Epoch). 2000
14. «Her Majesty's Diamonds» (a musical fairy-tale based on the songs and images of the «Beatles» in two acts and ten scenes). 2002, 2012
15. «Scared as of Bin Laden» (a two-act black comedy). 2003
16. «See You Later, Alligator» (a four-act serious comedy). 2004
17. «Lenaia» (a one-act theatrical satire). 2005
18. «Heller in Pink Tights» (a one-act anecdotal story with prologue and epilogue). 2006
19. «Casanova in the Butterfly Kingdom» (a one-act allegorical farce). 2007
20. «Christmas Eve» (a one-act dramedy). 2008
21. «A Sodomite Fantasy in Gayish Shades» (a five-act thriller in Old Testament style in three divertissements). 2010
22. «Shall we Resurrect Karabas?» (burlesque – a one-act fairy-tale for grown ups about puppet life). 2011
23. «Playing «Pok-ta-Pok» (a one-act comical science fiction with an epilogue). 2011

=== Adaptations ===
1. «Paint the Roses in Red» (a four-act nonsense drama based on Lewis Carroll's «Alice in Wonderland»). 1974, 2012
2. «Ram Story» (a two-act allegorical drama based on Mikhail Saltykov-Schedrin's fairy-tale «The Oblivious Ram»). 1983
3. «The Garden Party» (a two-act tragical farce based on Giles Cooper's and Edward Albee's «Everything in the Garden»). 1986
4. «A Clockwork Orange» (a two-act morality play in eight scenes based on Anthony Burghess' novella of the same name). 1994
5. «Mug Shoved onto a Stool» (extravaganza – a two-act freestyle fantasy in six scenes. Follows the motives of Bulat Okudzhava's novella «Shipov's Adventure or an Old Vaudeville: a True Incident»). 1994
6. «Sunset Boulevard» (a melodrama in five scenes – a scenic version of Billy Wilder's film of the same name; script authors: Billy Wilder, Charles Bracket, D.M. Marshman Jr.). 1996
7. «I Want a Gulliver Woman» (a two-act clip-comedy based on Irwin Shaw's novella «Small Saturday»). 1999
8. «Doll in a Pink Silk Dress» (a two-act melodrama based on Leonard Merrick's novella of the same name). 2000
9. «The House Party» (a three-act drama based on a short story of Stanley Ellin of the same name). 2009
10. «Bandar-logy» (a two-act parody-buff drama based on Rudyard Kipling). 2012

=== Translations of plays from English ===
Tennessee Williams

- «The Lady of Larkspur Lotion» (1946, 1953): one-act play.
- «Camino Real» (1953): play in sixteen blocks.
- «Period of Adjustment» (1960): two-act play.
- «Suddenly, Last Summer» (1958): one-act play in four scenes.
- «Something Unspoken» (1958): one-act play.
- «Out Cry» (1973): two-act play.
- «Clothes for a Summer Hotel» (1980): a two-act ghost play in four scenes.

Eugene O'Neill

- «Thirst» (1913): one-act play.

Edward Albee

- «The American Dream» (1959): one-act play.
- «The Sandbox» (1959): one-act play.

Harold Pinter

- «The Dumb Waiter» (1957): one-act play.
- «The Lover» (1962): one-act play.
- «The Homecoming» (1964): two-act play.
- «The New World Order» (1991): a sketch.
- «Precisely» (1983): a sketch.

Arthur Miller

- «The Man Who Had All the Luck» (1940): three-act play.
- «The Price» (1968): two-act play.
- «The Creation of the World and Other Business» (1972): three-act play.

David Mamet

- «Sexual Perversity in Chicago» (1974): one-act play.

Joe Orton

- «The Ruffian on the Stair» (first performed in 1964): one-act play in five scenes.

Matthew Witten

- «Washington Square Moves» (1993): two-act play in three scenes.

=== Theater productions ===
- «The Garden Party» based on «Everything in the Garden» by G. Cooper and E. Albee (translation, an authorial version by V. Denisov). The New Drama Theater, Moscow. Staging – Petr Shtein. (Opening night: 1987)
- «American Ideal» based on «American Dream» by E.Albee (translated by V. Denisov). The Theater of Southwest, Moscow. Director – Bill Raffeld (USA). (Opening night: 1992)
- «Six Specters of Lenin on a Piano» by V. Denisov. The «Laboratory» Drama Theater, Moscow. Staging – Andrey Rossinsky. (Opening night: 20 May 1993)
- «Creation of the World and Other Business» by A. Miller (translated by V.Denisov). The «Laboratory» Drama Theater, Moscow. Staging – Victor Shulman. (Opening night: 2 November 1993)
- «The Newlywed» based on «Period of Adjustment» by T. Williams (translated by V. Denisov). The M. Gorky Drama Theater, Rostov-na-Donu. Director – Valentina Zavarina (San-Francisco, USA). (Opening night: May 1994)
- «Camino Real» by T.Williams (translated by V. Denisov). The «Laboratory» Drama Theater, Moscow. Staging – Andrey Rossinsky. (Opening night: April 1995)
- «Sebastian's Garden» based on «Suddenly, Last Summer» by T.Williams (translated by V.Denisov) and on the comedy «Women at the Assembly» by Aristophanes. Young Audience Theater, Rostov-na-Donu. Director – Kirill Serebrennikov. (Opening night: 1995)
- «Suddenly, Last Summer» by T.Williams (translated by V. Denisov). The S. Tsvilling Drama Theater, Chelyabinsk. Director – Andrey Zhitinkin. (Opening night: 1996)

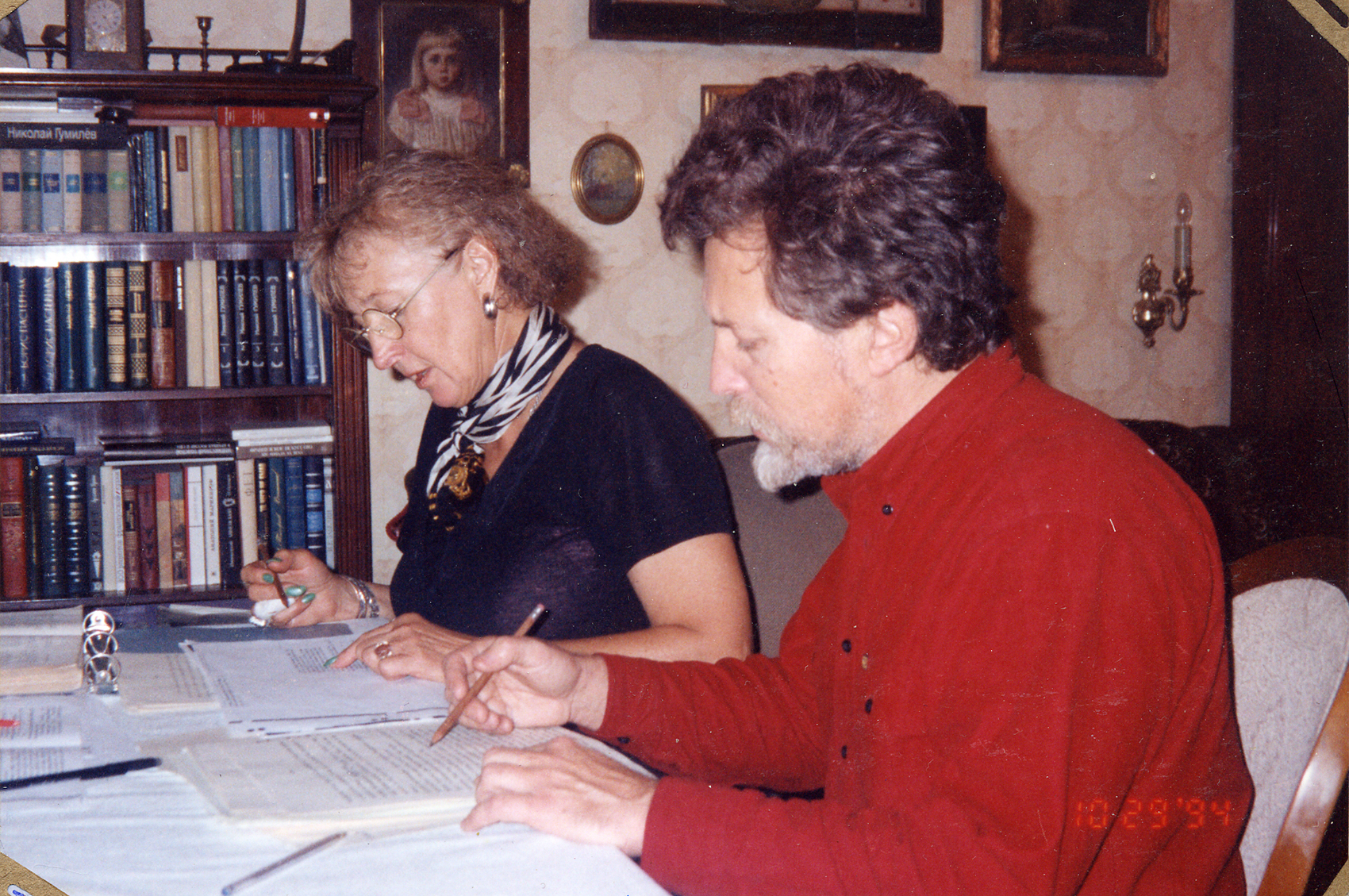
V .Denisov & a San-Francisco director V. Zavarina, 1994

- «Locked Garden – My Sister» based on the play «Out Cry» by T. Williams (translated by V. Denisov). The Chamber Theater «Tangra» (The Bulgarian Cultural and Informational Center), Moscow. Director – Sergey Stebliuk. (Opening night: the 1997–98 season)
- «The Lover» by H. Pinter (translated by V. Denisov). The Single-Show Company of Kontzedalov, Kiev. Staging, choreography and musical design – Roman Viktiuk. (Opening night: 1995)
- «Sunset Boulevard» – V. Denisov's scenic version of B.Wilder's film of the same name. The «Domino» Theater, Saint Petersburg. Staging and musical design – Roman Viktiuk. (Opening night: 13 February 1998)
- «Sunset Boulevard» – V. Denisov's scenic version of B.Wilder's film of the same name. The Russian Theater of Estonia, Tallinn. Staging and musical design – Roman Viktiuk (Opening night: 16 October 1998)
- «Out Cry» by T.Williams (translated by V. Denisov). The "Stairs" Theater, Moscow. Director – Nikolai Popkov. (Opening night: 2001)
- «The Lady of Larkspur Lotion» based on a play by T.Williams (translated by V. Denisov) and T.Williams' diaries. The Seaside Theater of Youth, Vladivostok. Staging – Sergey Lepsky. (Opening night: 2002)
- «The Lover» by H.Pinter (translated by V. Denisov.) Single-Play Company «Teatron-N», Saint Petersburg. Staging – Vladimir Mirzoev. (Opening night: 2002)
- «Sunflowers» based on T.Williams' «Out Cry» (translated by V. Denisov). Production of Efim Spector (Moscow) and the Surgut Music and Drama Theater. Staging – Boris Yukhananov. (Opening night: 2002)
- «Sunset Boulevard» – V. Denisov's scenic version of B.Wilder's film of the same name. The «Artistic Constellation» Theater, Novosibirsk. Staging, set and costume design – Galina Naumova. (Opening night: 2004)
- «Sunset Boulevard» – V. Denisov's scenic version of B.Wilder's film of the same name. The «Actor's House» Theater, Novosibirsk. Staging, set and costume design – Galina Naumova. (Opening night: 29 October 2005)
- «The Lover» by H.Pinter (translated by V. Denisov). The V. Komissarzhevskaya Drama Theater, Saint Petersburg. Staging – Ljuptcho Georgievski (Macedonia). (Opening night: 27 May 2008)
- «Out Cry» by T.Williams (translated by V. Denisov). Theater 31, Moscow. Staging and set design – Oksana Glazunova. (Opening night: November 2009)
- «The Haven» (for the 90th anniversary of the Vakhtangov Theater). A two-act performance based on the works of B. Brecht, I. Bunin, F. Dostoyevsky, F. Durrenmatt, A. Miller, A. Pushkin, E. de Phillipe. «The Price» by A. Miller (translated by V. Denisov). The Vakhtangov Theater, Moscow. Artistic director of the production – Rimas Tuminas. (Opening ninight: 11 November 2011)
- «The Dumb Waiter» by H.Pinter (translated by V. Denisov). The «Stage Coach» Artistic Center, Toljatti. Director – Andrey Antipenko. (Opening night: 27–28 April 2012)
- «The Lover» by H.Pinter (translated by V. Denisov). The Youth Theater of Volgograd. Director – Aleksey Serov. (Opening night: 2012)
- «Out Cry or a Show for Two» based on «Out Cry» by T.Williams (translated by V. Denisov). Young Audience Theater (The Small Stage), Yaroslavl. Artistic director of the production – Igor Larin. (Opening night: 4 December 2012)
- «Price» by A.Miller (translated by V. Denisov). The Vladimir Mayakovsky Theater (The Small Stage), Moscow. Director – Leonid Kheifets. (Opening night: 29 November 2012)

=== From the «Chamber Theater» cycle at the Bakhrushin Museum ===
- «Casanova in the Butterfly Kingdom» by V. Denisov – staged reading and discussion. Director – Lyudmila Odiyankova. (20 November 2009)
- «When the Saints Go Marching In» by V. Denisov – staged reading and discussion. Director – Lyudmila Odiyankova. (20 April 2010)
- «English According to Shakespeare's Method» by V. Denisov – staged reading and discussion. Director – Vadim Dantziger (the director of the «Test» theater school, which belongs to the Moscow Ermolova Theater). (March 2011)
- «Playing «Pok-ta-Pok» by V. Denisov – staged reading and discussion. Director – Lyudmila Odiyankova. (25 March 2012)
- «Invited to the Feast» by V. Denisov – staged reading and discussion. Director -Lyudmila Odiyankova. (23 March 2013)

=== From the «Theater Without a Microphone» cycle ===
An artistic meeting with the playwright Victor Denisov. «See You Later, Alligator» – concert performance and discussion. Director – Lyudmila Odiyankova. The M. Rudomino Library for Foreign Literature, Moscow. (27 March 2009)

=== Publications in books ===
- Five Playwrights under One Cover: E.E. Cummings, H. Pinter, E. Albee, S. Shepard, T. Williams. A Collection of Plays in English. «The Dumb Waiter» (H.Pinter), «The American Dream» (E. Albee), «Camino Real», «Out Cry», «Garden District»: «Something Unspoken», «Suddenly, Last Summer» (T.Williams) – translated by V. Denisov. The Regional Academic-Methodological Center of Folk Arts: Samara, 1991.
- Tennessee Williams. Desire and the Black Masseur (plays, short stories, essays). Translated by V. Denisov. Progress Publishing Group (Gamma Publishing House): Moscow, 1993.
- Victor Denisov. Six Specters of Lenin on a Piano. A collection of plays. The Agar Publishing House: Moscow, 1998.
- Arthur Miller. Please Don't Kill Anything! (essays, novellas, plays). Translated by V. Denisov. The AST Publishing House, the Olympus Publishing House: Moscow, 2002.
- Harold Pinter. The Collection (a collection of best plays by H. Pinter). («The Lover», «The Homecoming» translated by V. Denisov). The Amfora Publishing House: Saint Petersburg, 2006.
- Arthur Miller. Death of a Salesman (a collection of three great plays by A.Miller). («The Man Who Had All the Luck» translated by V. Denisov). The AST Publishing House, The Astrel Publishing House: Moscow 2011.
- Arthur Miller. Incident at Vichy (a collection of three plays). («The Creation of the World and Other Business» translated by V. Denisov). The AST Publishing House, The Astrel Publishing House: Moscow, 2011.

=== Separate publications of plays and essays translated from English by Victor Denisov ===
==== In the «Contemporary Drama» almanac ====
- «American Dream» by E.Albee, 1995 – July–December, No. 3,4.
- «The Lover», «The Homecoming» by H.Pinter, 1996 – October–December, No.4.

==== In the «Theatrical Life» magazine ====
- «The Sandbox» by E.Albee, 1988 – April.
- «In Russia» by A.Miller, 1990 – November.

==== In the «Screen and Stage» weekly ====
- «Lady of Larkspur Lotion» by T.Williams, 1995, No.15 (275), 20–27 April.

==== In the «Prompter» foreign drama magazine ====
- «Clothes for a Summer Hotel» by T.Williams, 1992, No.4.
- «Creation of the World and Other Business» by A.Miller, 1995, No. 4.

==== In the «Contemporary Fiction Abroad» magazine ====
- Arthur Miller on Cultural Life in the USSR in the End of the Sixties (fragments from his book «In Russia»), 1990 – September–October, No.5.

=== Victor Denisov as an essayist (annotations – surveys – reviews – essays) ===
==== In the «Contemporary Drama» almanac ====
- In the Search of a Streetcar Named «Desire», 1991 – September–October, No.5.
- Tennessee Williams: From Literary Legacy, 1991 – November–December, No.6.
- The Romantic of 20th Century, 1994 – October–December, No.4.
- Made in USA: «The Studied and the Omitted», 1996 – January–March, No.1.
- A Polecat Under the Home Bar (A foreword to the publication of H.Pinter's plays «The Lover» and «The Homecoming»), 1996 – October–December, No.4.

==== In the «Prompter» foreign drama magazine ====
Instead of an Afterword. Prepared for the publication of T.Williams' play «Clothes for a Summer Hotel», 1992, No. 4. Happy Anniversary! (Instead of an Afterword). Prepared for the publication of A. Miller's play «The Creation of the World and Other Business», 1995, No. 4.

==== In the «Contemporary Fiction Abroad» magazine ====
- Harry Crеws «Car», 1974 – September–October, No.5.
- Mark Harris «Killing Everybody»,1975 – March–April, No.2.
- Robert Silverberg «Unfamiliar Territory»,1975 – July–August, No.4.
- Gore Vidal «Myron»,1977 – January–February, No.1.
- Irwin Shaw «Nightwork», 1977 – November–December, No.6
- «The Play as the Thing». Four Original Television Dramas. Ed. by Tony Gifford, 1978 – September–October, No.5.
- Erich Segal «Oliver's Story», 1979 – September–October, No.5.
- Tennessee Williams «Where I Live». Selected Essays, 1981 – May–June, No.3.
- Maurice Yacowar «Tennessee Williams and Film», 1981 – September–October, No.5.
- Erich Segal «Man, Woman and Child», 1982 – July–August, No.4.
- Tennessee Williams «A Lovely Sunday for Creve Coeur», 1983 – January- February, No.1.
- Tennessee Williams «Clothes for a Summer Hotel», 1985 – November–December, No.6.
- Walter Tevis «Mockingbird». Walter Tevis «The man Who Fell To Earth», 1986 – November–December, No.6.
- Gore Vidal «Duluth», 1987 – May–June, No.3.
- Tennessee Williams Collected Stories, 1988 – July–August, No. 4.
- Conversations with Tennessee Williams. Edited by Albert Devlin, 1989 – November–December, No. 6.

==== In the «Social Sciences Abroad» magazine ====
- Rodgers I. Tennessee Williams: A Moralist's Answer to the Perils of Life, 1976. 1978, 5, series 7.
- Tennessee Williams: A Collection of Сritical Essays, 1977. 1980, 1, series 7.
- Tennessee Williams: «Where I Live». Selected Essays, 1978. 1980, 4, series 7.
- Hirsch F.A. A Portrait of the Artist: The Plays of Tennessee Williams,1979.1980, 4, series 7.

==== In the «Public Thought Abroad» book review ====
Madsen D. USSA.1991, December, No.12.

==== In the Moscow University Herald ====
The Evolution of Genre in Arthur Miller's Drama. 1991, No.2, series 9.

=== V. Denisov's translations of prose from English (novels – novellas – short stories) ===
1. Irwin Shaw. A short story. In: Whispers in Bedlam (works of European and American Prose Masters, Dedicated to Sports). Physical Education and Sports: Moscow, 1982.
2. Hugh Garner. «Wait Until You're Asked» (a short story). In: The Lamp at Noon. Stories of Teenagers by Canadian Writers. Molodaya Gvardiya: Moscow, 1986.
3. Stanley Ellin. «The Best of Everything» (novella), «The House Party» (novella). In: Death of Christmas Eve. Raduga: Moscow,1992.
4. Ray Bradbury. «The Machineries of Joy» (a novella), «The Life Work of Juan Dias» (a novella). In: To the Chicago Abyss. The Progress Publishing Group, «Bestseller»: Moscow, 1993.
5. William Burnett. The Little Caesar: A Collection of Contemporary American Detective Novels. Raduga: Moscow,1993.
6. Hammond Innes . «Levkas Man» (a novel). In : A Corpse for Christmas.. Anthology of the Foreign Detective Novel. The Moscow Worker : Moscow, 1994.
7. Richard Condon. The Oldest Confession . Centropoligraph: Moscow, 1995.

== Articles ==
1. (English) Marina Blagonravova. «The Many Incarnations of Lenin». The Moscow Tribune, Tuesday, 2 November 1993.
2. (English) John Freedman. «A Bold, New Playwright Tackles Dalí, Lenin». The Moscow Times, Thursday, 16 September 1993.
3. (English) John Freedman. «Six Specters of Lenin on a Piano», the «Laboratory»Theater. From: Moscow Performances. The New Russian Theater 1991–1996 (page 57). Harwood Academic Publishers, 1997.
4. (English) Charles Evans. «Pinter in Russia», p. 173. The Cambridge Companion to Harold Pinter. 2nd Edition. Series: Cambridge Companions to Literature. Edited by Peter Raby. Homerton College, Cambridge, March 2009.
5. (Russian) Alexander Aronov. «Octopus in the Bathroom». The Moscow Komsomol newspaper, 13.12.1987.
6. (Russian) I. Verbova. «A Ghost Roams Around the Piano». The Moscow Pravda, 21 September 1993.
7. (Russian) Konstantin Goryachev. «Lenin Khurakhara?» The Afisha newspaper, 11–12 – 93/94 (61–62), Moscow.
8. (Russian) Svetlana Novikova. «Victor Denisov: Philologist, Translator, Playwright. Is There Really More?» The Theater Messenger, Moscow, March 1999.
9. (Russian) V. Denisov. «The Playwright's Address to the Audience». (The theater programme of the serious comedy «See You Later, Alligator» in the M. Rudomino Library for Foreign Literature, 2009, Moscow.)
10. (Russian) «One Day We Will Have to Answer to the Question «What For?»» Reporting from the theater: the RGSU students Inna Bugaeva, Darja Kazakova, Ekaterina Rubtsova. The Social University, Moscow, 6 December 2010, No. 834.

== Links ==
1. (English) Art Planet International: Victor Denisov
2. (English) The Cambridge Companion to Harold Pinter (Cambridge Companions to Literature) Peter Raby (Editor)
3. (English) Sunset Boulevard – a-ivashkevich.com
4. (English) Leon Sachs – Wikipedia.
5. (Russian) «The Epoch Goes Falcetto». Elena Skulskaya, the «ME Saturday» newspaper, 24.10.98.
6. (Russian) Roman Viktiuk: Norms Made Up by Society and Morals – Are Fiction. Galina Sapozhnikova. The Komsomol Truth, 09.12.1998.
7. (Russian) Only in the Theater Death Never Prevails. The Deadmen Get Up and Wait for Applause. Ella Agranovskaya, «Merchant Haven» newspaper, 14.05.98.
8. (Russian) The Three Affairs of Ada Rogovtseva. Interview by Elena Petrovskaya, the «Independence» newspaper, 15.09.98.
9. (Russian) Sunset Boulevard. The «SANT» Theater Official Website.
10. (Russian) Translators: D | Sergey Efimov's Theatrical Library ...
11. (Russian) The Sad Harmony of Tennessee Williams. Svetlana Korotkova, «The Week's Mirror» № 48, 14 December 2002.
12. (Russian) Billy Wilder's Heroes Onstage. Irina Uljanina. Merchant.ru. «Kommersant». (Novosibirsk), №202 (3041), 28.10.2004
13. (Russian) Casanova Surrounded by Buttefrlies. Inna Bugaeva, Ekaterina Rubtsova, Grigory Slavnikov. RGSU The Art Column, Library of articles.
14. (Russian) Vadim Dantziger Presents a Reading of a New Comedy . The Theatregoer, 15 March 2011.
15. (Russian) Victor Denisov «English According to Shakespeare's Method…»
16. (Russian) For the International Day of Theater. «Playing «Pok-ta-Pok».
17. (Russian) Evenings at the Bakhrushin House: The Altered Reality of Lyudmila Odiyankova
18. (Russian) Victor Denisov – biography – theater workers
19. (Russian) Denisova Muza Nikolaevna – A Biography

== Video ==
1. (Russian) Victor Denisov «Six Specters of Lenin on the Piano» on YouTube
2. (Russian) А.Миллер "Сотворение мира..." (пер. В. Денисова) on YouTube
3. (Russian) Casanova in the Butterfly Kingdom. Alexei Kostiuchenko. Video. «Slavianka». Training Theater.
4. (Russian) Roman Viktiuk, «The Lover» by Harold Pinter on YouTube
