= Amphion class =

Amphion class may refer to:

- Amphion-class submarine, diesel-electric submarines of the British Royal Navy, ordered in 1943, for service in the Pacific Ocean theater of World War II
- Modified Amphion-class cruiser, a class of eight Leander-class cruisers built for the Royal Navy in the early 1930s that saw service in World War II
- Amphion-class frigate, a class of three frigates built during the Napoleonic Wars; designed by shipbuilder William Rule
