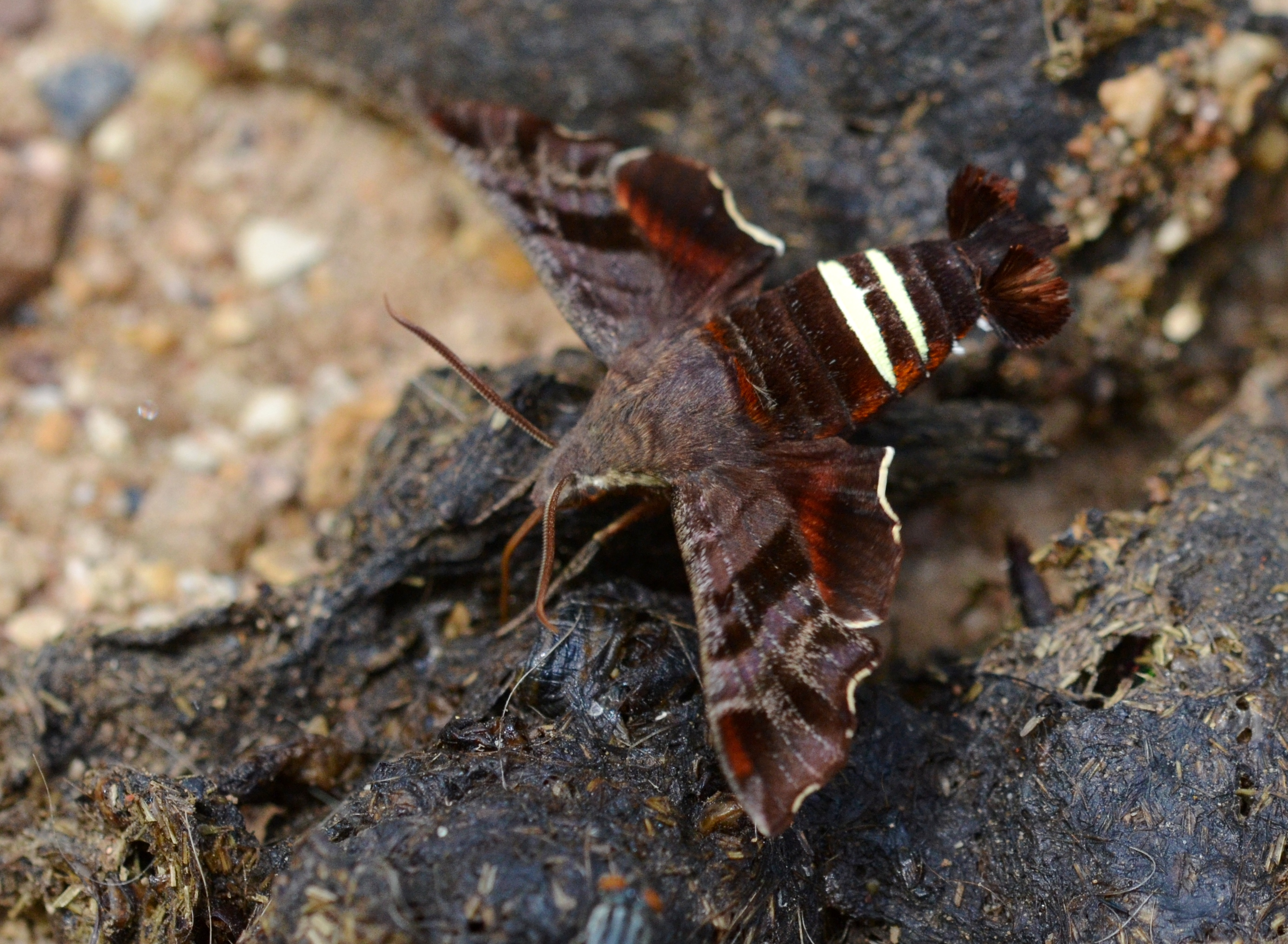

Scientific classification
- Kingdom: Animalia
- Phylum: Arthropoda
- Clade: Pancrustacea
- Class: Insecta
- Order: Lepidoptera
- Family: Sphingidae
- Subtribe: Macroglossina
- Genus: Amphion; Hübner, 1819
- Species: A. floridensis

Binomial name
- Amphion floridensis B. P. Clark, 1920

Synonyms
- Sphinx nessus Cramer, 1777

= Amphion floridensis =

Nessus sphinx

Species of moth

Amphion floridensis, the Nessus sphinx, is a day-flying moth of the family Sphingidae. The species was described by Pieter Cramer in 1777, and renamed in 1920. It is the only member of the genus Amphion erected by Jacob Hübner in 1819. It lives throughout the eastern United States and Canada and occasionally south into Mexico, and is one of the more commonly encountered day-flying moths in the region, easily recognized by the two bright-yellow bands across the abdomen.

== Description ==
The Nessus sphinx has reddish median bands on its hindwings and two prominent horizontal yellow stripes and a tail feather-like hair tuft on abdomen of both sexes. The wingspan is 37–55 mm. It has a stout body and reddish-brown upperside wings, and in some individuals the hindwings may have pale to absent median band or a yellow spot on the costal margin.

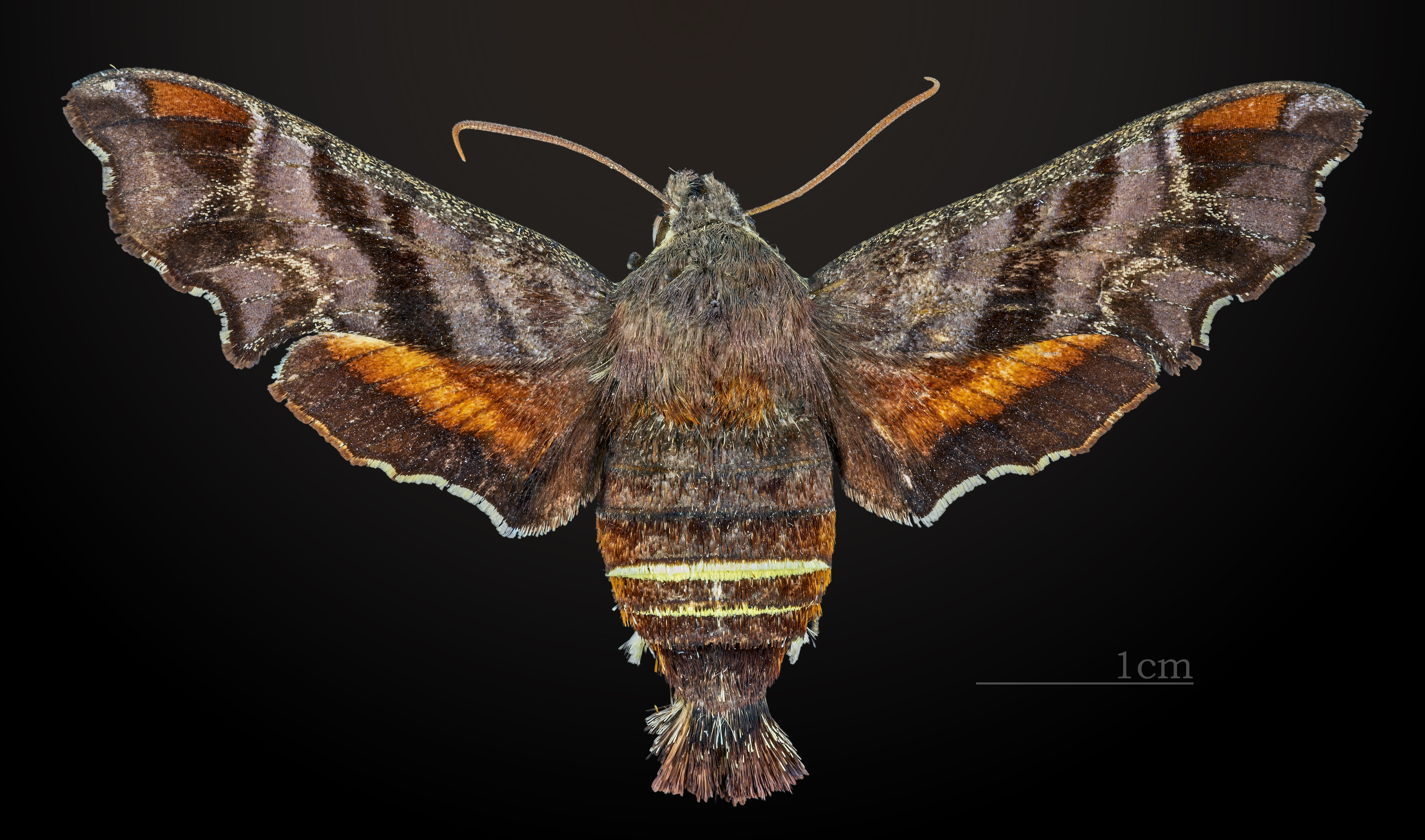
Female

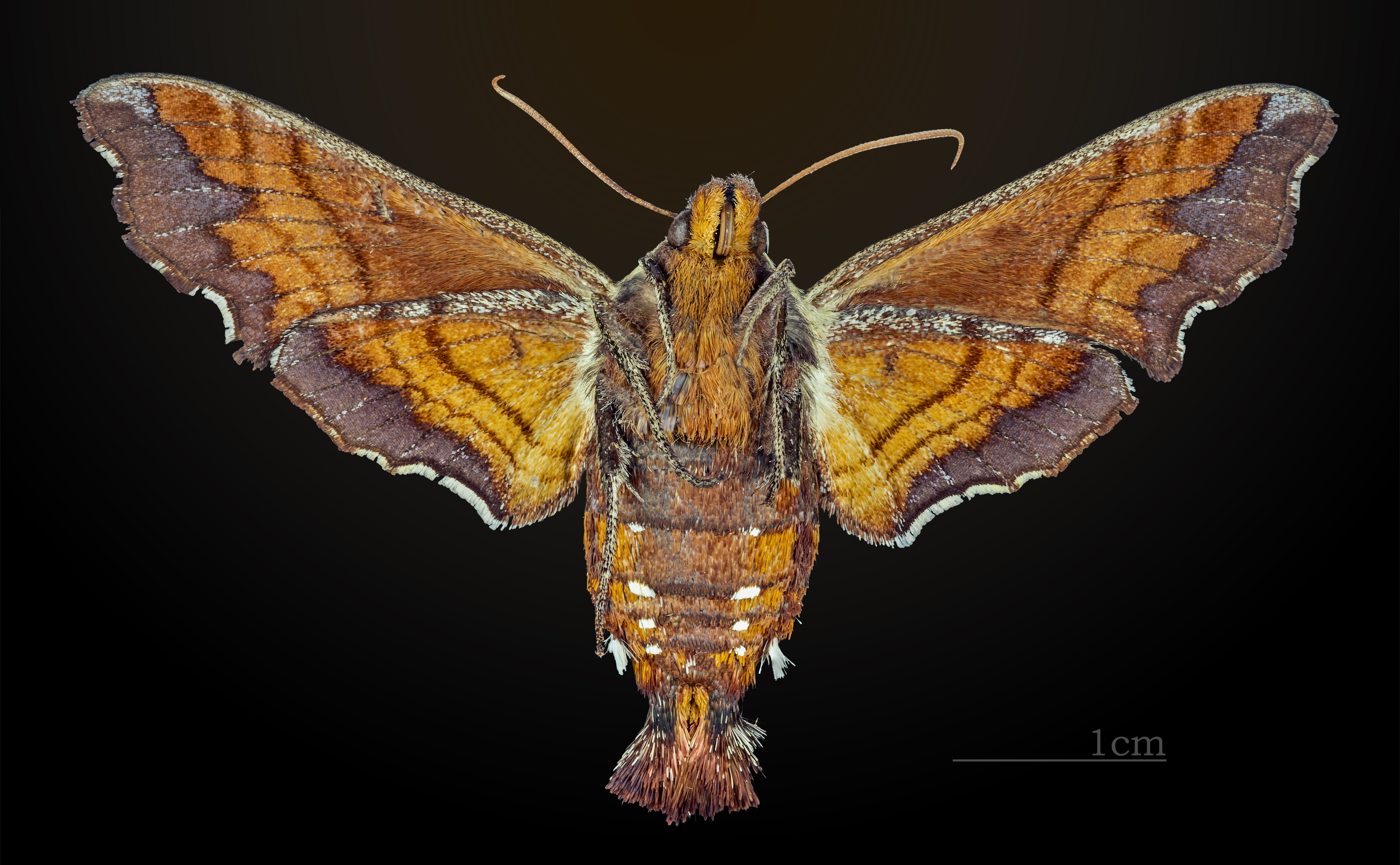
Female underside

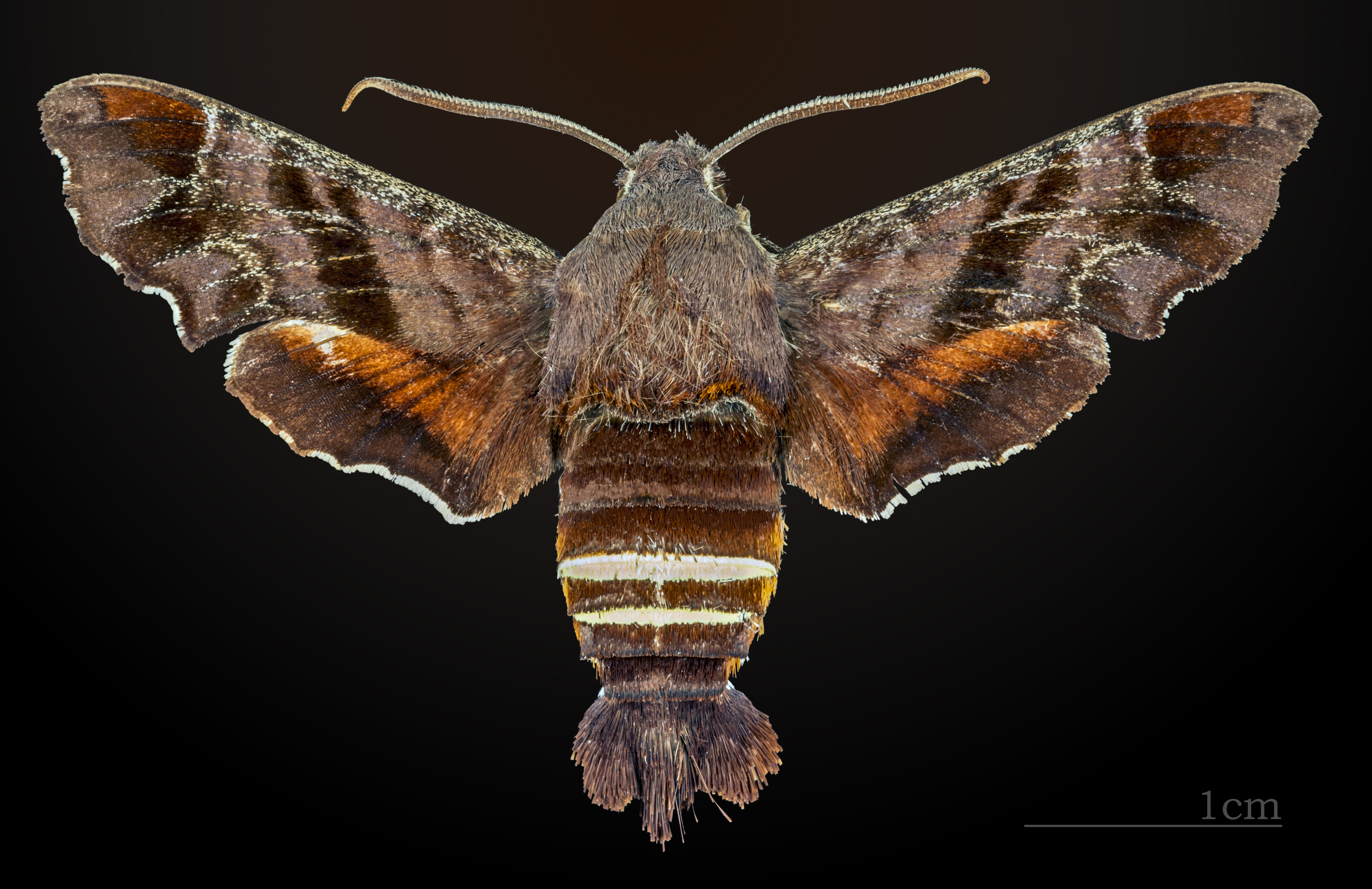
Male

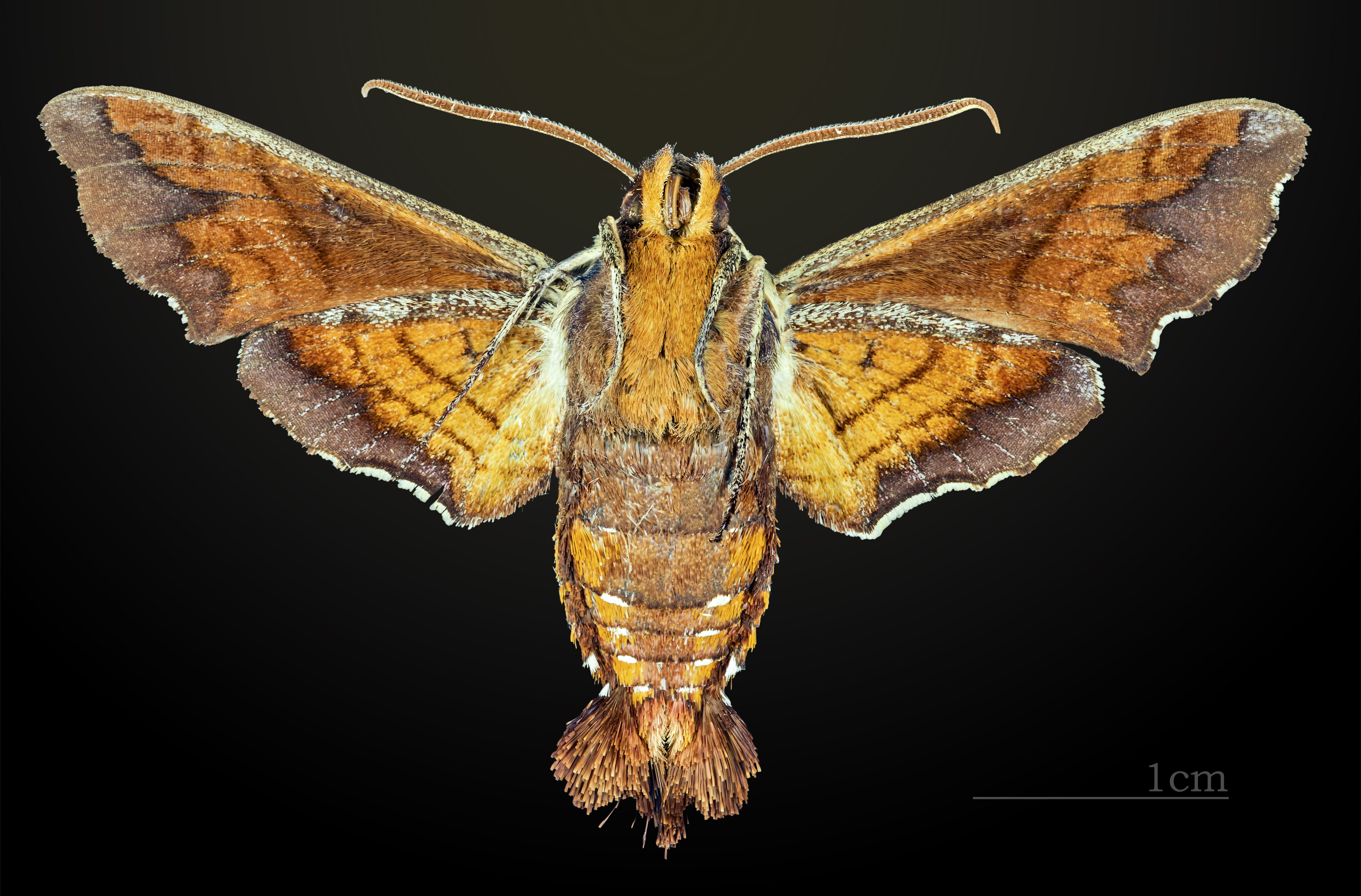
Male underside

== Geographic range ==
Found in the Eastern United States from Maine to Florida and as far west as Colorado.. The Canadian range extends from the southeast corner of Manitoba to Nova Scotia.

== Habitat ==
Found in deciduous and mixed woodlands, cultivated orchards, along streams, and in suburbs with sufficient tree cover.

== Biology ==
Adults are on wing from April to July in one generation in the north and in two generations in the south. The adults feed on the nectar of various flowers, including Syringa vulgaris, Geranium robertianum, Kolkwitzia amabilis, Philadelphus coronarius, and Phlox species.

The larvae feed on Vitis, Ampelopsis, and Capsicum species.

== Taxonomy ==
It was first described as Sphinx nessus by Pieter Cramer in 1777. This name was invalid, because Dru Drury had already used it for another species (Theretra nessus) in 1773. A replacement name was published in Benjamin Preston Clark in 1920.

== Images ==
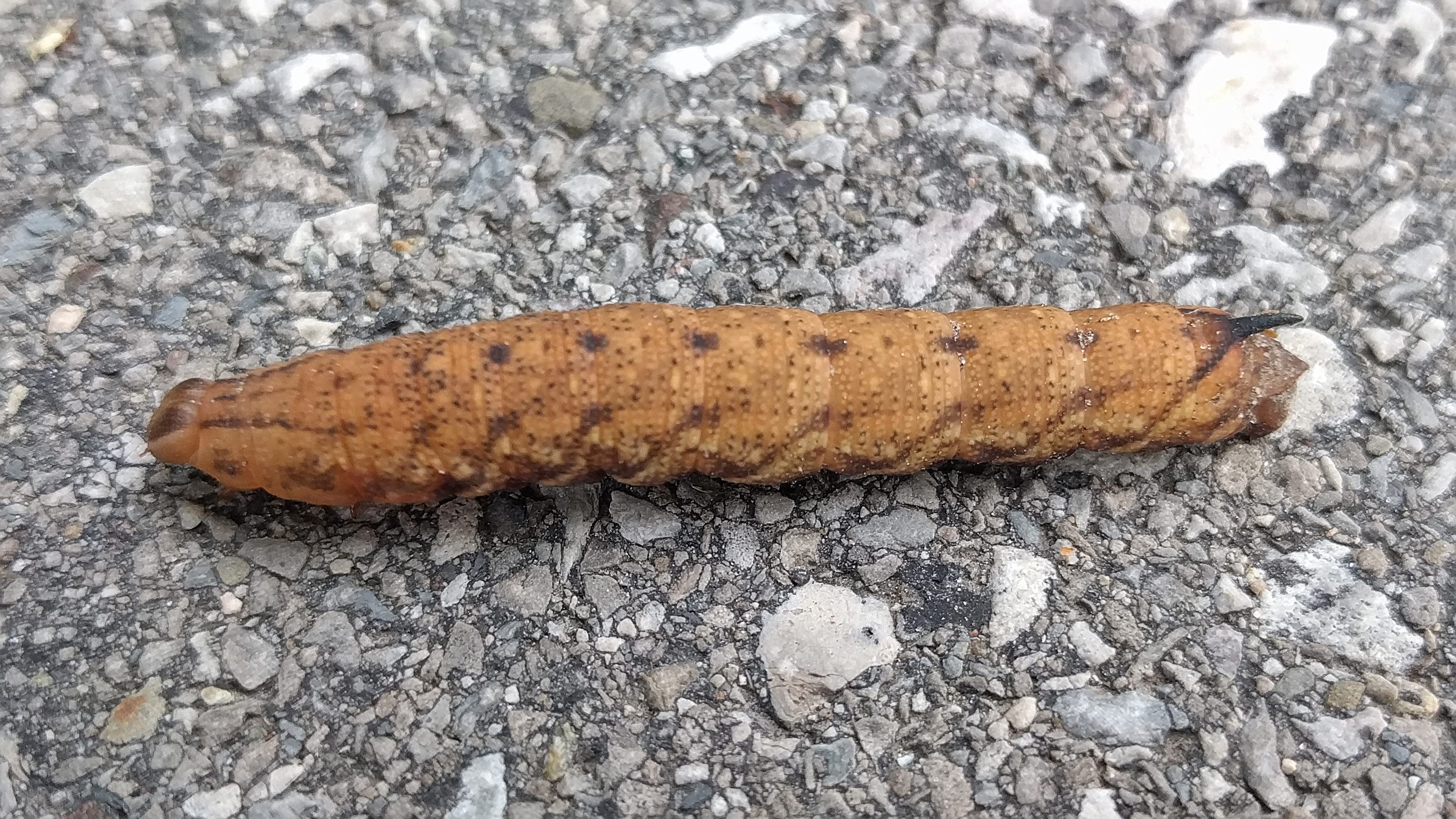
As caterpillar (top view)

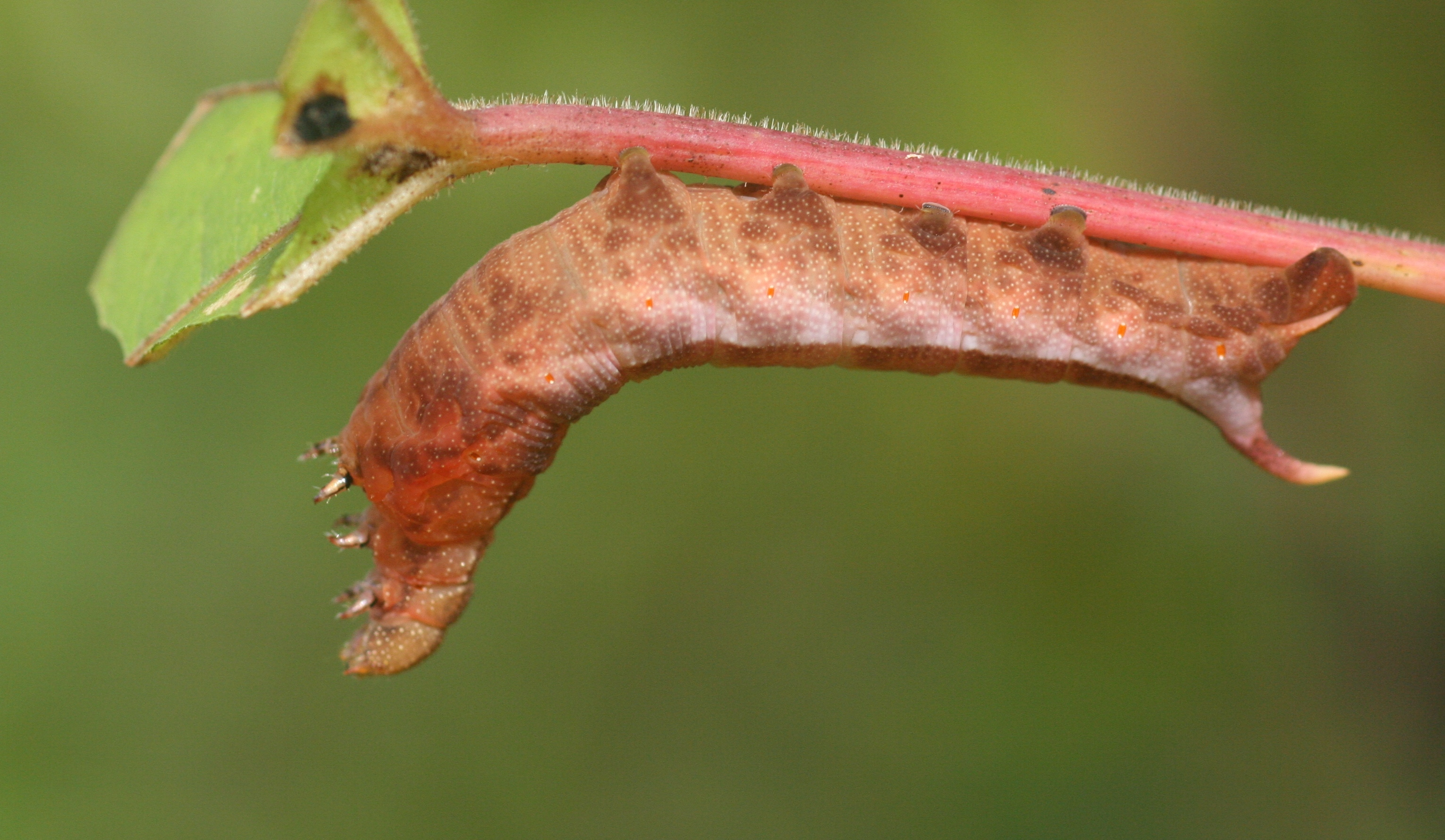
As caterpillar (bottom view)

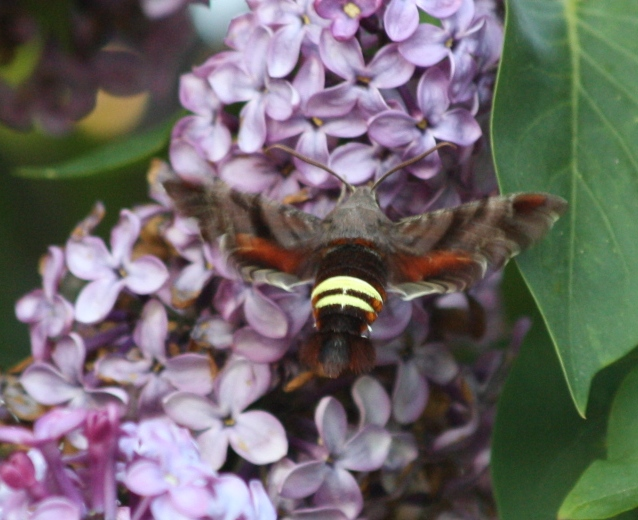
Flying on a lilac

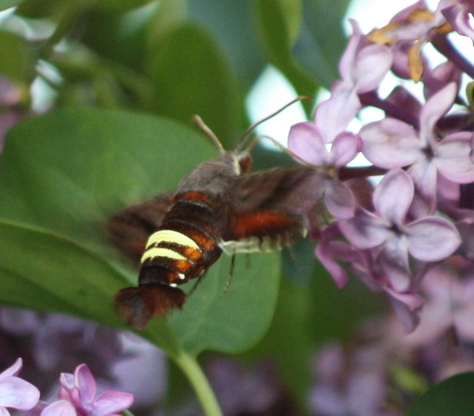
Side view
