= Untilovsk =

Debut play by Leonid Leonov

- Original language: Russian
- Written by: Leonid Leonov
- Setting: 1920s, remote Siberian community

Premiere
- Date: 17 February 1928
- Place: Moscow Art Theatre

Untilovsk (Russian: Унтиловск) is the debut play by Russian writer Leonid Leonov.

== Publication ==
Untilovsk was first published in the March 1928 issue of Novy Mir magazine, although Act 1 had originally appeared in the August 1926 issue of Krasnaya Nov.

The play was included into volume 4 of the first edition of The Collected Works by L. Leonov in five volumes, which came out in Leningrad in 1930, and later into a collection called Plays (Пьесы), in 1935. In 1936 Leonov made an attempt to radically revise the play an re-wrote two acts, but other engagements prevented him, in his own words "from taking the play through myself for the second time." It appeared in Volume 7 of the extended, 1971 version of the Collected Works published by Khudozhestvennaya Literatura.

== Synopsis ==
Raisa Buslova, once sprightly and beautiful but now a defeated woman, returns to a dismal provincial hole, after unsuccessful attempt to escape from it, with her lover. It turns out that not only Buslov, her husband, but several more men here await for her full of romantic ambitions, much to the chagrin of their wives.

== Stage production ==
From November 1924 till March 1925 Leonov was busy working upon a short novel called "Untilovsk", then dropped it. In October 1925 Konstantin Stanislavski approached him, asking to write a play for the Moscow Art Theatre. Leonov suggested his unfinished novel's plotline, and Stanislavski liked it. In December of this year its first version was completed. Stanislavski greatly enjoyed the play, and started working upon the production in the 1927/1928 winter season, with Vasily Sakhnovsky and Leonov himself. "Each time it felt like a whiff of fresh air, when the author himself started talking, explaining things about his characters... His explanations usually centered around some particular word, line or expression the deeper meaning of which might have otherwise escaped the cast and the director," Sakhnovsky remembered.

The play premiered on 17 February 1928 but ran for only 20 performances, due to lukewarm public response and some harsh press reviews. Anatoly Lunacharsky described it as a step backwards for the theatre.

Leonov later spoke of how greatly he valued his experience with Stanislavski and the cast. "The play was long and difficult, I had to make considerable cuts... With the Untilovsk production behind, I felt much more mature in many respects," he remembered in 1934.

== Analysis ==
The contemporary Soviet critics interpreted the play as showcasing the conflict between the two social types: 'the aggressive philistine' (Chervakov) and the honest, 'working intelligentsia' type (Buslov). Leonov himself held a more pessimistic view on his own creation. He described Untilovsk as "the all-consuming mire hosting all kinds of creatures, rare plants and fishes," with its own laws and customs, "even its own poetry, the other side of zero." Raisa (a once glamorous woman whose attention every single male character seems to be craving for) wasdescribed by the author as 'worn-out' and 'devoid of the music she once radiated'. And Buslov (whom many critics considered as being on the way to some kind of 'revival') was, according to Leonov doomed to 'sink to the bottom'.

The modern theatre historian Inna Solovyova described the play as the one dealing with "...hopeless, thick misery of life amidst the snowy desert where political prisoners had to make their home… the drunken brewing of the unrealized dark powers of the soul and the all-consuming dark passions," and akin to both Chekhov's Uncle Vanya and Three Sisters, as well as Maxim Gorky's The Lower Depths, some of "its psychological twists bringing to mind the Dostoyevsky novels."
