= Ada Chumachenko =

Russian writer (1887–1954)

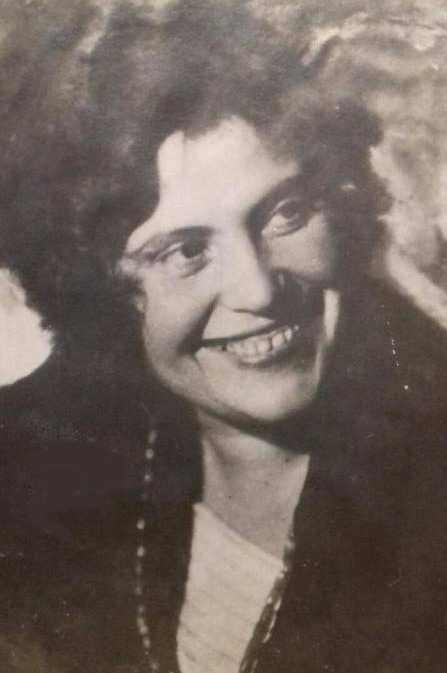
- Chumachenko in 1927
- Born: 9 September 1887; Taganrog
- Died: 5 May 1954 (aged 66); Moscow

Ada Artemyevna Chumachenko (Russian: Ада Артемьевна Чумаченко; 9 September 1887 – 5 May 1954) was a Russian poet, playwright and writer.

== Life ==
Chumachenko was born in Taganrog in 1887. Her parents Artemy Pavlovich Chumachenko and Ariadna Iasonovna Chumachenko (born Blonskaya) were both Ukrainian and teachers.

She began publishing poetry locally in 1895 at the age of eight and more widely from 1905. She wrote two plays for children which were staged by the Nezlobin Theater: Lully the Musician, which won a prize in 1912, and The Snow Queen in 1915. She published her first book of poems in 1912.

After the Russian Revolution, she led the theater section at the People's Commissariat for Education in the Moscow Palace of Arts. She brought on many young writers including Maxim Gorky. After 1926 she wrote for children and her best received work was "A Man from the Moon" in 1939. This was a fictional biography of the scientist Nicholas Miklouho-Maclay.

During the war she moved jobs and ended up in 1945 at the children's magazine Murzilka.

Chumachenko died in Moscow in 1954.
