= Leonid Leonov =

Russian writer

- Леонид Максимович Леонов
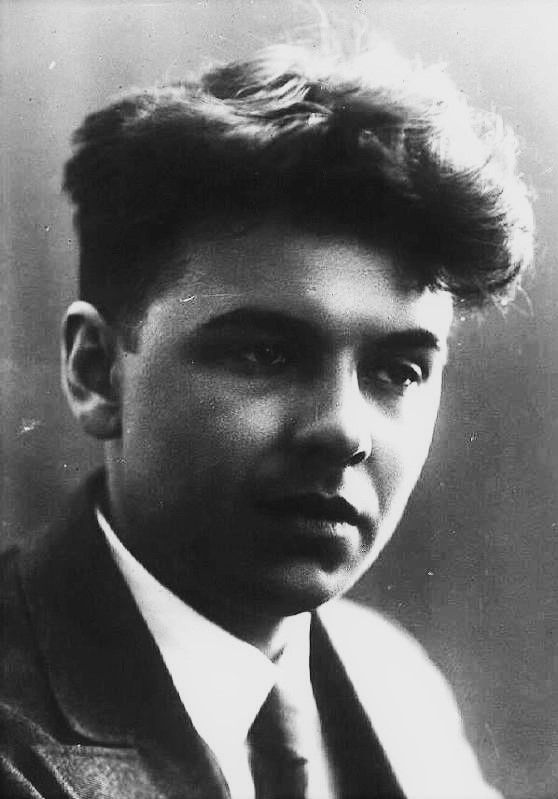
- Photograph circa 1934
- Born: Leonid Maksimovich Leonov; 31 May 1899; Moscow, Russian Empire
- Died: 8 August 1994 (aged 95); Moscow, Russia
- Spouse: Tatayana Sabashnikova (m. 1926)
- Children: 2
- Writing career
- Genres: Fiction, drama
- Notable works: Sot; Soviet River; The Badgers; The Thief; The Russian Forest

Leonid Maksimovich Leonov (Russian: Леони́д Макси́мович Лео́нов; 31 May [O.S. 19 May] 1899 — 8 August 1994) was a Soviet novelist and playwright of socialist realism. His works have been compared with Dostoevsky's deep psychological torment.

== Early life ==
Leonov was born in Moscow in 1899. His father, Maksim Leonov, was a self-educated peasant poet who was at one time the chairman of the Surikov Literary and Musical circle (Surikov was also of peasant origin). Maksim Leonov later joined the Sreda literary group of Moscow, which counted Maxim Gorky, Leonid Andreyev, and Ivan Bunin among its members.

Leonov's earliest memory was of 1905, when Grand Duke Sergei Alexandrovich of Russia was assassinated by the terrorist Kalyayev. In the same year, Leonov's father was arrested for two pamphlets that he had published. Leonov was taken twice by his grandmother to visit his father in prison. After serving 20 months, Maksim Leonov was exiled to Arkhangelsk. Leonov visited him there several times, and his impressions and observations were later reflected in many of his works, especially Sot.

He attended the Moscow Third gymnasium from 1910 to 1918. His first poems, reviews, and news reports were published in 1915 in the journal Severnoe Utro. He had intended to study medicine at Moscow State University, but his plans were disrupted by the outbreak of the Russian Civil War.

== Career ==
During the Russian Civil War, Leonov worked as a reporter with the Red Army. He was released from the Red Army in 1921 in order to continue his education. At that time, he planned to study painting. Upon returning to Moscow, he was unable to find any of his close relatives and acquaintances, but he was eventually accepted into the home of his uncle, a locksmith named Vasilyev. Leonov worked in his uncle's shop voluntarily in order to repay his uncle for taking him in. Later, the famous graphic artist Falilyev took an interest in him. Falilyev introduced him to some well-known literary figures and artists of the early 20s, including the publishers Solomon Kopelman (of the Shipovnik Publishing House), and Sergei Sabashnikov. After seeing some of his early stories, they both offered to publish them. This was the beginning of Leonov's professional literary career. Among his first stories were Buryga and The Wooden Queen (1923).

His first (and perhaps best) novel, The Badgers (1924), employs a fairly conventional style but is filled with peasant speech; it "deals with the impact on the village and the peasantry of the Revolution and symbolically pits brother against brother in the struggle." His dark novel The Thief (1927), set in the criminal underworld of the Russian capital, was warmly welcomed by critics in Russia and abroad, but Brown considers it "spoiled in execution by the self-conscious literary poses of the author and his transparent derivation of himself from the irrationalist Dostoevsky. Leonov nonetheless performs a shrewd psychological dissection upon his main character, a disillusioned commissar who has become a member of a gang of thieves. He produced a thoroughly reworked version of this novel in 1959."

He married Tatayana Mikhailovna Sabashnikova in 1926; the couple had two daughters. He visited Maxim Gorky in Sorrento in 1927. The Moscow Art Theatre under the direction of Konstantin Stanislavski staged Leonov's play Untilovsk, which was set in a remote Siberian community. The production opened on 17 February 1928, having given a preview to the theatre's management committee three days earlier. Both the committee and the wider press disapproved of the play's ideological stance; Anatoly Lunacharsky, writing in the Leningrad journal Krasnaia, described it as a step backwards for the theatre.

Soviet River (1930) describes the construction of a paper mill on the banks of a river in the middle of the Siberian forest; Skutarevsky (1932), "probably one of his best works in style and intellectual power, explores the psychological problems of an eminent scientist working in a socialist state and, in what is undoubtedly an autobiographical statement, traces his development from a skeptical critic of the new order into an enthusiastic supporter." In 1934, Leonov helped Maxim Gorky to found the Union of Soviet Writers. The following year, he published a fantasy about the Soviet future, Road to the Ocean, in which the hero, "another embodiment of Leonov, meditates on the suffering he has caused and endured and tries to answer the question whether it was worth while in the total economy of history."

Immediately after the start of World War II, Leonov penned several patriotic plays, which were quickly made into movies and won him the Stalin Prize (1943). His novel The Russian Forest (1953) was acclaimed by the authorities as a model Soviet book on World War II and received the Lenin Prize, but its implication that the Soviet regime had cut down "the symbol of Old Russian culture" caused some nervousness, and Nikita Khrushchev reminded the author that "not all trees are useful ... from time to time the forest must be thinned." In 1945, Leonov served as a correspondent for Pravda at the Nuremberg trials. He was elected as a Deputy of the Supreme Soviet of the Soviet Union in 1950. In 1967, Leonov was named a Hero of Socialist Labour. He was admitted to the Academy of Sciences of the Soviet Union five years later. During the last decades of his life, he worked upon the dark nationalistic-religious epic The Pyramid (1994).

Korney Chukovsky described Leonov as follows in his diary entry for 21 August 1946:

I've been seeing a lot of Leonid Leonov and admire his splendid character. He's a strong man, well armed for life. He visits once or twice a week and talks nonstop, but never brings up his own plans, projects, or triumphs. The Maly is premiering a play of his tomorrow, say, or he had a book come out yesterday—he'll talk for three hours and never breathe a word of it. Not only is there no hint of the braggart in him, he goes on and on about his failures and defeats. He can do anything with his hands: he makes lampshades, tables, and chairs; he molds faces out of clay; he has fashioned a magnificent cigarette lighter out of bronze—he has all kinds of instruments and tools. Watch the way he handles seeds or berries and you know he's got a green thumb. Simple as he looks, he plays his cards close to the chest. He is well-bred and well-organized, oddly lacking in kindness but a thoroughbred, and he has a poetic nature. In short, he's a typical Russian.

== Awards ==
- Hero of Socialist Labour (1967)
- Six Orders of Lenin
- USSR State Prize (1977) – screenplay for "Escape of Mr. McKinley" (1975)
- Order of the Red Banner of Labour, twice
- Order of the October Revolution, twice
- Order of the Patriotic War, 1st class, twice
- Honored Art Worker of the RSFSR (1949)
- Leo Tolstoy Award for Literature (1993)
- Stalin Prize, 1st class (1943) – for the play "Invasion"
- Lenin Prize (1957) – for his novel "Russian Forest" (1953)

== English translations ==
- Sot, Putnam, 1931
  - as Soviet River, MacVeagh/Dial Press, 1931.
- The Thief, MacVeagh/Dial Press, 1931.
- Skutarevsky, Harcourt, Brace and Company, 1936.
- Road to the Ocean, L. B. Fischer, NY, 1944.
- Chariot of Wrath, L. B. Fischer, NY, 1946.
- The Badgers, Hutchinson International, 1947.
- The Russian Forest, Progress Publishers, 1966.
- The Wooden Queen, from Great Soviet Short Stories, Dell, 1990.

== Filmography ==
- 1963 Русский лес (The Russian Forest) – screenplay
- 1975 Бегство мистера Мак-Кинли (The Flight of Mr. McKinley) film / closet screenplay
