= Fyodor Kokoshkin (playwright) =

Russian dramatist, playwright, Moscow government official and theatre entrepreneur

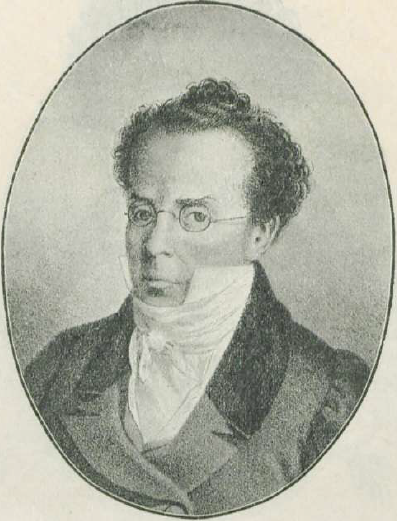
- Born: 1 May 1773; Moscow, Russian Empire
- Died: 21 September 1838 (aged 63); Moscow, Russian Empire
- Education: Imperial Moscow University
- Occupations: dramatist, playwright, translator, entrepreneur

Fyodor Fyodorovich Kokoshkin Russian: Фёдор Фёдорович Кокошкин; 1 May 1775, Moscow, Russian Empire — 21 September 1838, Moscow) was a Russian dramatist and playwright, Moscow government official and theatre entrepreneur, the first director of the Moscow troupe of the Imperial Theatres, in 1823—1831.

Several of his poems (including "On Napoleon's Retreat", 1812) appeared in Vestnik Evropy, Syn Otechestva and Amphion. He authored several original comedies (among them Little Demon on Vacation, 1818, and The Bringing Up or Here's Your Dowry, 1824), as well as numerous re-workings of the popular French vaudevilles, to be produced by the Imperial Theatres in Russia. Among his better-known translations was that of Molière's The Misanthrope (1816).

A staunch champion of classicism in Russian literature, he favoured 'artiness' which many of his contemporaries ridiculed as lifeless pomposity, and was one of the major detractors of Alexander Griboyedov and his Woe from Wit.

Kokoshkin either tutored or provided crucial help for several future stars of the mid-19th century Russian theatre stars, including Mikhail Shchepkin and Sergey Shumsky. He avidly promoted the salon culture in Moscow, wrote plays for amateur performances, participated in them, and was the leader of an artistic group which included Mikhail Zagoskin, Mikhail Dmitriyev, Alexander Pisarev, Sergey Aksakov and Alexander Shakhovskoy.

His grandson Fyodor Fyodorovich Kokoshkin, Jr. (1871-1918) was one of the founders of Russian Constitutional Democratic Party.
