= Russian opera =

Music genre

Russian opera is the art of opera in Russia. Operas by composers of Russian origin, written or staged outside of Russia, also belong to this category, as well as the operas of foreign composers written or intended for the Russian scene. These are not only Russian-language operas. There are examples of Russian operas written in French, English, Italian, Latin, Ancient Greek, Japanese, or the multitude of languages of the nationalities that were part of the Empire and the Soviet Union.

Russian opera includes the works of such composers as Glinka, Mussorgsky, Borodin, Tchaikovsky, Rimsky-Korsakov, Stravinsky, Prokofiev and Shostakovich.

Searching for its typical and characteristic features, the Russian opera (and Russian music as a whole), has often been under strong foreign influence. Italian, French, and German operas have served as examples, even when composers sought to introduce special, national elements into their work. This dualism, to a greater or lesser degree, has persisted throughout the whole history of Russian opera.

== 18th century ==
Opera came to Russia in the 18th century. At first there were Italian language operas presented by Italian opera troupes. Later some foreign composers serving to the Russian Imperial Court began writing Russian-language operas, while some Russian composers were involved into writing of the operas in Italian and French. And only at the beginning of the 1770s were the first modest attempts of the composers of Russian origin to compose operas to the Russian librettos made. This was not a real creation of Russian national opera per se, but rather a weak imitation of Italian, French or German examples. But nevertheless, these experiments were important, and paved the way for the great achievements of 19th and 20th centuries.

=== Italians ===
Originating in Italy in c. 1600, opera spread all over Europe and reached Russia in 1731, when the King of Poland and Elector of Saxony August II the Strong (based in Dresden) 'loaned' his Italian opera troupe to the Russian Empress Anna for the celebration of her coronation in Moscow. The first opera shown in Russia was Calandro by Giovanni Alberto Ristori (1692–1753), performed in Moscow in 1731 under the direction of the composer and his father Tommaso, with 13 actors and nine singers including Ludovica Seyfried, Margherita Ermini and Rosalia Fantasia.

After that Italian opera troupes were welcomed to Russia for the entertaining of the Empress and her Court. In 1735 a big Italian opera troupe led by a composer Francesco Araja was invited for the first time to work in Saint Petersburg. The first opera given by them was Araja's La forza dell'amore e dell'odio, with a text by Francesco Prata, staged on 8 February [OS 29 January], 1736 as Sila lyubvi i nenavisti (The Power of Love and Hatred). Araja’s next two productions were the operas seria Il finto Nino, overo La Semiramide riconosciuta to the text by Francesco Silvani given on 9 February 1737 [OS 28 January], Saint Petersburg and Artaserse to the text by Pietro Metastasio, performed on 9 February 1738 [OS 28 January] in Saint Petersburg. Araja spent around 25-year in Russia and wrote at least 14 operas for the Russian Court.

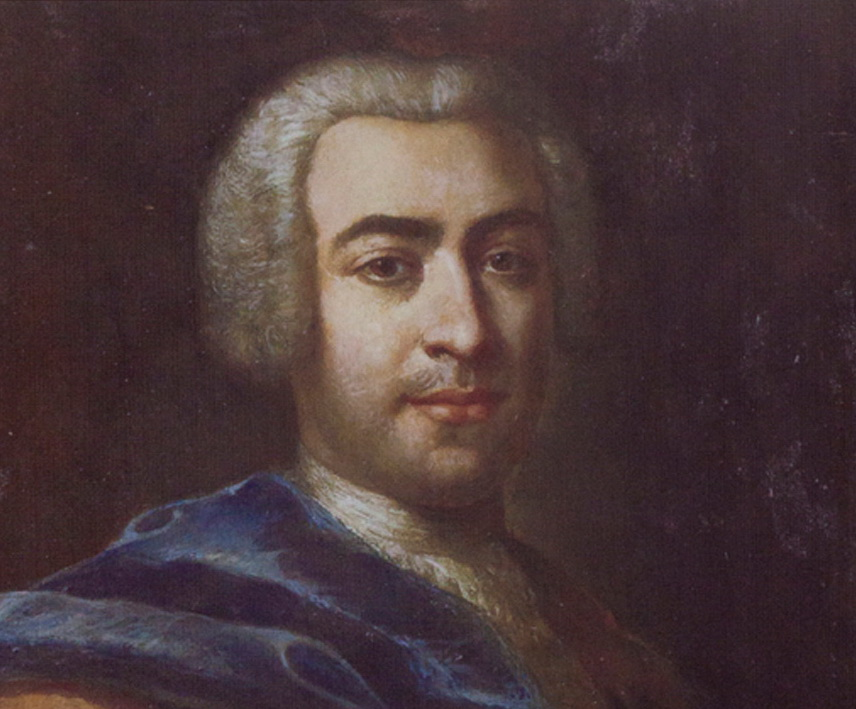
Francesco Araja

In 1742, in connection with the celebration of the coronation of Empress Elizaveta Petrovna in Moscow the opera Tito Vespasiano [La clemenza di Tito] by Johann Adolf Hasse (1699–1783) was staged. A new theatre was built especially for this event. In 1743 at "Zimnij Dvorets", the (Winter Palace) in Saint Petersburg, instead of a small hall of "Comedie et opere" was built a new Opera House (architect Bartolomeo Rastrelli) that held about a thousand persons.

Valeriani: Sets for the "first Russian opera" Tsefal i Prokris by Araja, 1755

The next opera seria by Araja, Seleuco, was performed on 7 May [O.S. 26 April] 1744 in Moscow as a part of the double celebration of the anniversary of the coronation of Elizaveta Petrovna and conclusion of peace with Sweden. This was followed by Araja's Bellerofonte, written by Giuseppe Bonecchi, which was performed 9 December [O.S. 28 November] 1750 in Saint Petersburg. He wrote the first opera in Russian, Tsefal i Prokris (Cephalus and Prokris, libretto by Alexander Sumarokov) that was staged in Saint Petersburg in 1755. This was followed by Alceste in 1758, written by German composer Hermann Raupach, written again by Sumarokov.

In 1757, a private opera enterprise directed by Giovanni Battista Locatelli (1713 – c. 1770) was invited to Saint Petersburg. They had shown an opera every week for the court, and two-three times a week they were allowed to give open public performances. The repertoire was mostly of Italian opera buffa. For the first three years the troupe had presented the seven operas by Baldassare Galuppi (1706–1785) including Il mondo della luna (The World of the Moon), Il Filosofo di campagna (The Village Philosopher), and Il mondo alla roversa, ossia Le donne che commandono (The Worlds Upside Down, or Women Command).

In the 1760–80s in Russia there were working in turn Venetian Galuppi, Manfredini from Pistoia, Traetta from Bitonto near Barri, Paisiello from Taranto, Sarti, Cimarosa from Campania, and Spaniard Martin y Soler. Each of them brought an important contribution, producing operas to the Italian as well as Russian libretti. Here are listed some of the operas written and premiered in Russia:

Vincenzo Manfredini (1737–1799) spent 12 years in Russia and died in Saint Petersburg. The son and pupil of famous baroque composer Francesco Manfredini, he was a music teacher for Pavel Petrovich who later became Emperor of Russia. For the Russian Imperial Court Manfredini wrote five operas including: Semiramide (1760, Saint Petersburg), L'Olimpiade (1762 Moscow) and Carlo Magno (1763 Saint Petersburg).

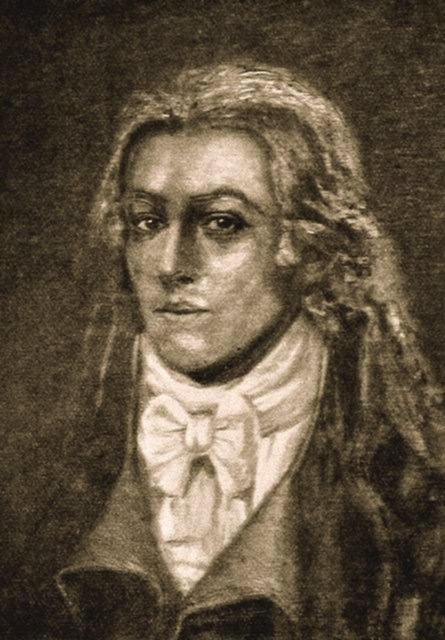
Tommaso Traetta

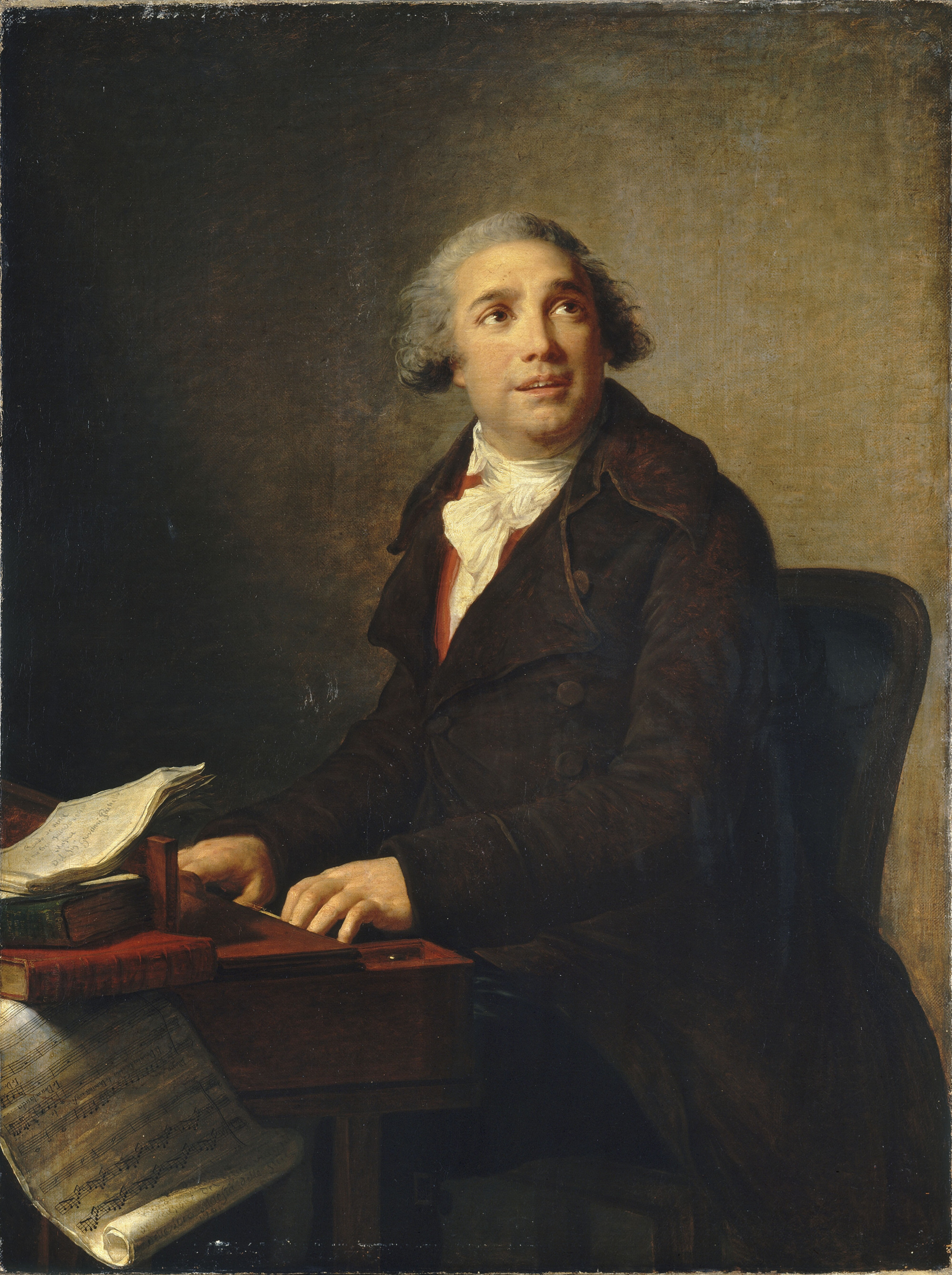
Giovanni Paisiello

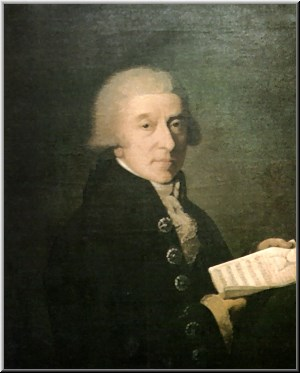
Giuseppe Sarti

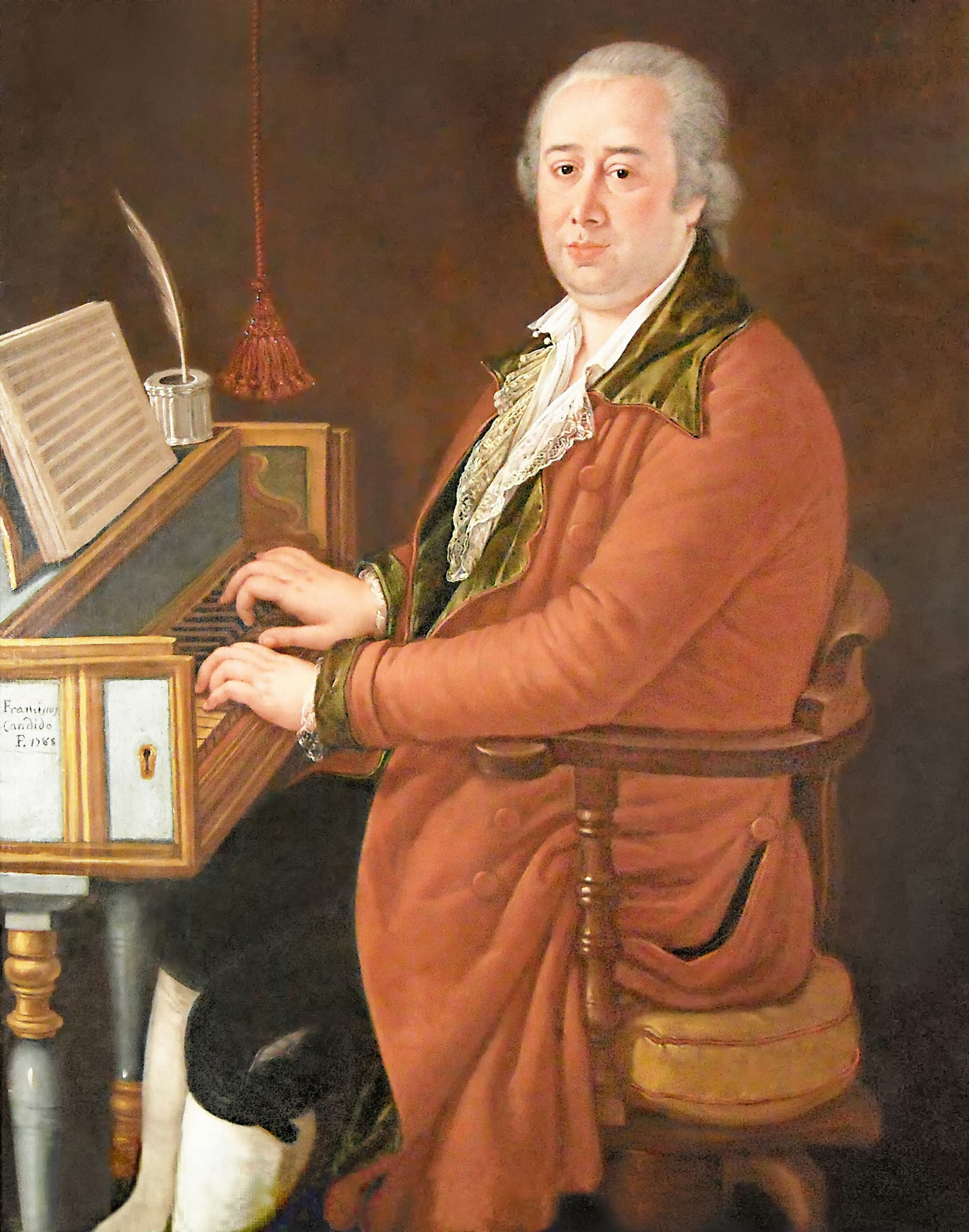
Domenico Cimarosa

Tommaso Traetta (1727–1779) was a maestro di cappella at the Russian Imperial Court for eight years (1768–1775, and wrote there five operas, including: Astrea placata (1770), Antigone (1772), and Le quattro stagioni e i dodici mesi dell'anno (1776), all of which were performed in Saint Petersburg.

Giovanni Paisiello (1740–1816), a famous Neapolitan composer of more than 100 operas seria and buffa, he spent in Russia eight years (1776–1783), where he wrote 12 operas including Nitteti (1777 Saint Petersburg), Lucinda e Armidoro (1777 Saint Petersburg), Il barbiere di Siviglia, ovvero La precauzione inutile (1782 Hermitage Theatre), and Il mondo della luna (1782 Kamenny Island Theatre).

Giuseppe Sarti (1729–1802), a composer of about 40 operas, he spent in Russia eighteen years (1784–1802). After being for eight years a maestro di cappella at the Imperial Court, he spent the next four years at the service of Prince Grigori Alexandrovich Potemkin at his estate in Southern Russia. Then he returned to the Court. In 1801 he solicited permission to return, because his health was broken. The emperor Alexander I dismissed him in 1802 with a liberal pension. Sarti died in Berlin. His most successful operas in Russia were Armida e Rinaldo and The Early Reign of Oleg (Nachal'noye upravleniye Olega), for the latter of which the empress herself wrote the libretto. Among the nine operas written in Russia are also: Gli amanti consolati (1784 Saint Petersburg), I finti eredi (1785 Saint Petersburg, Bolshoi Kamenny Theatre), Castore e Polluce (1786 Hermitage Theatre) and La famille indienne en Angleterre (1799 Saint Petersburg, Bolshoi Kamenny Theatre).

Domenico Cimarosa, (1749–1801) another famous Neapolitan composer, singer, violinist, harpsichordist, conductor ant teacher, who composed about 75 operas, was a maestro di cappella in Russia for five years (1787–1791), where he wrote: La felicità inaspettata (1788 Hermitage Theatre), La vergine del sol'e (1788? Hermitage Theatre; 1789 Saint Petersburg, Bolshoi Kamenny Theatre) and La Cleopatra (Cleopatra e Marc Antonio 1789 Hermitage Theatre)

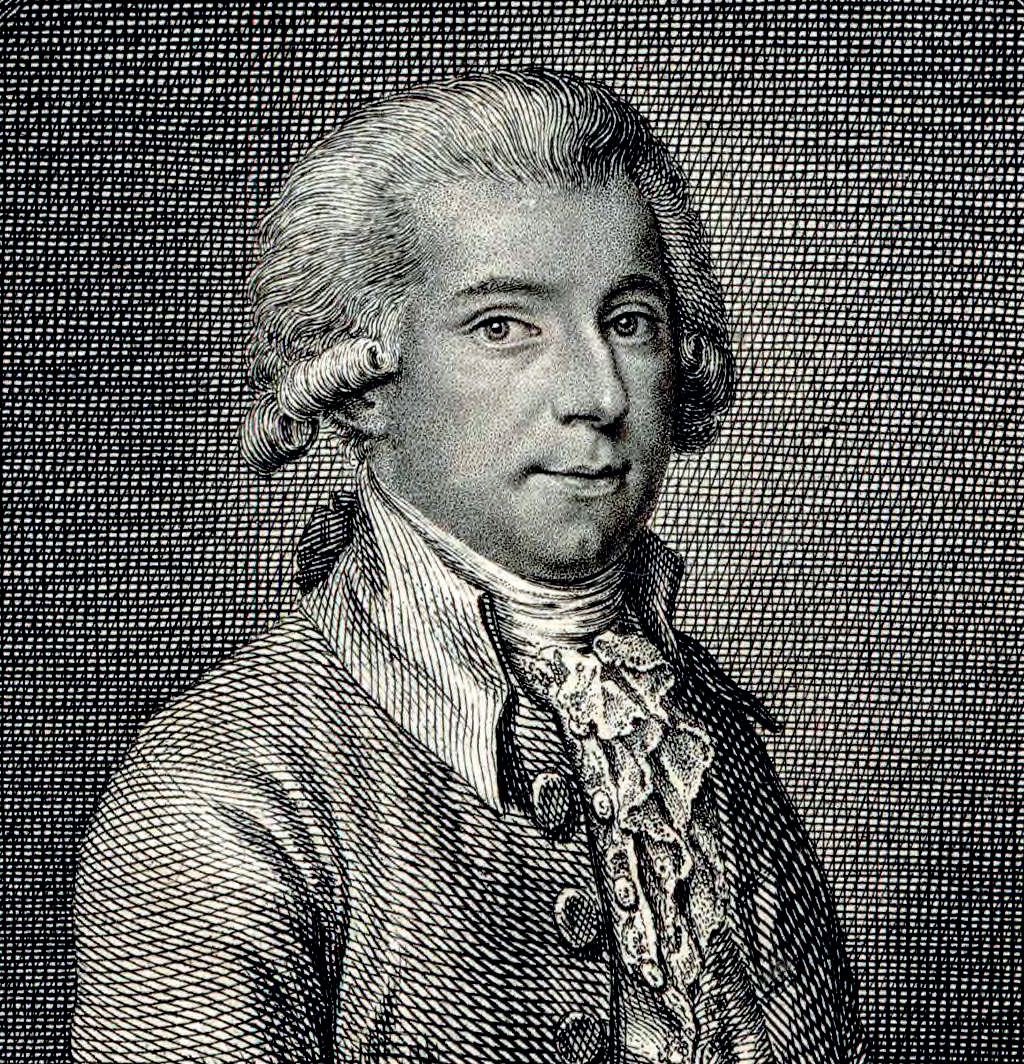
Vicente Martín y Soler

Vicente Martín y Soler (1754–1806) a Spanish organist and composer of 21 operas and 5 ballets, he settled in Russia c1788, where he was called "Martini". He wrote there: Gore-Bogatyr Kosometovich (libretto by Catherine II of Russia, 1789 Hermitage Theatre) with overture on three Russian tunes, Pesnolyubie (1790 Hermitage Theatre), and La festa del villagio (1798 Hermitage Theatre).

Two of his operas premiered in Vienna, but also staged in Russia, Una cosa rara, o sia Bellezza ed onestà (The Rare Thing) and L'arbore di Diana (Diana's Tree) were especially popular. The first of them performed in Russian translation of Ivan Dmitrievsky had some elements of the antifeudal directivity. He died in Saint Petersburg in January 1806.

Ivan Kerzelli (also known as I. I. Kerzelli, or Iosif Kertsel) was a representative of a big family of foreign musicians Kerzelli (probably of Czech origin), settled in Russia in the 18th century. He is regarded as a composer of a few famous operas: Lyubovnik – koldun (The Lover-Magician 1772 Moscow), Rozana i Lyubim (Rozana und Lyubim 1778, Moscow), Derevenskiy vorozheya (The Village Wizard c. 1777 Moscow) (Overture and songs were printed in Moscow 1778; They were the first opera fragments printed in Russia) and Guljanye ili sadovnik kuskovskoy (Promenade or the Gardener from Kuskovo 1780 or 1781 Kuskovo, Private Theatre of Count Nikolai Sheremetev).

Antoine Bullant (also known as Antoine or Jean Bullant, 1750–1821), another composer of Czech origin settled in Russia in 1780 wrote a large number of operas with Russian librettos, often within Russian national settings. He was especially famous for his comic opera Sbitenshchik (Сбитеньщик — Sbiten Vendor), comic opera in 3 acts, written to the libretto by Yakov Knyazhnin (remake of Molière's L'école des femmes). The opera was staged 1783 or 1784 in Saint Petersburg, at the Bolshoi Kamenny Theatre, and was played until 1853.

There were also extremely popular the operas by Belgian/French André Ernest Modeste Grétry (1741–1813), like L'Amitié à l'épreuve (first staged 1779, Kuskovo theatre) or Les Mariages samnites that was performed during 12 years (since 1885, Kuskovo, Ostankino theatres) with serf-soprano Praskovya Zhemchugova at the private opera of Nikolai Sheremetev.

=== Russians ===
Two talented young Russians Berezovsky and Bortniansky were sent by Catherine II to Italy to study art of music composition.

Maksym Berezovsky (1745–1777) went to Italy in the spring of 1769 to train with Padre Giovanni Battista Martini at the Bologna Philharmonic Academy, where he graduated with distinction. He wrote an opera seria Demofoonte to the Italian libretto by Pietro Metastasio for the carnival at Livorno (staged February 1773).

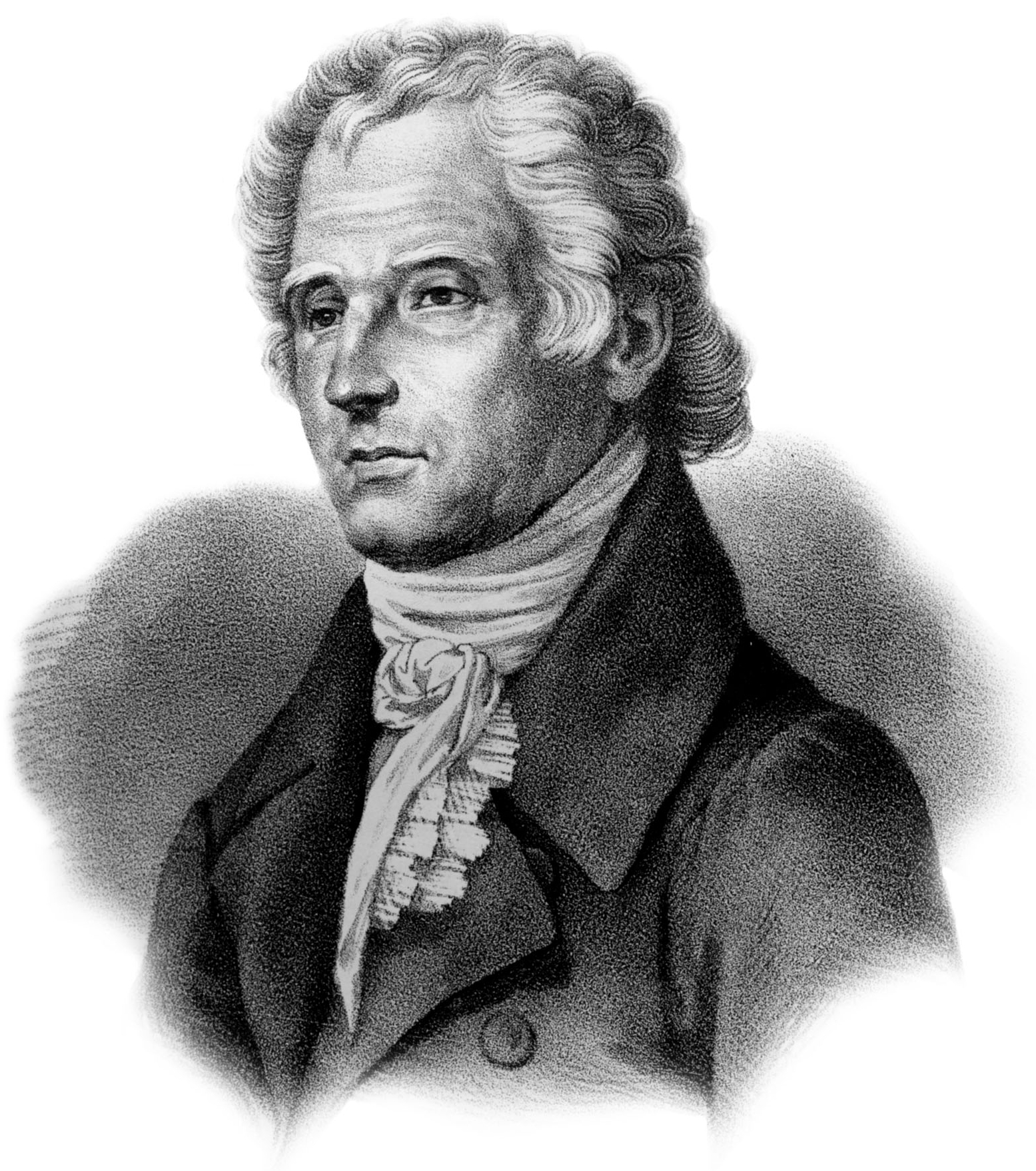
Dmytro Bortniansky

Dmytro Bortniansky (1751–1825), a pupil of Hermann Raupach and Baldassare Galuppi, went to Italy following his teacher Galuppi. In Italy, Bortniansky gained considerable success composing operas: Creonte (1776) and Alcide (1778) in Venice, and Quinto Fabio (1779) at Modena. Bortniansky returned to the court at Saint Petersburg in 1779 where he composed four more operas (all in French, with libretti by Franz-Hermann Lafermière): Le Faucon (1786), Le Fete du Seigneur (1786), Don Carlos (1786), and Le Fils-Rival ou La Moderne Stratonice (1787).

At the same time in Russia, a successful one-act opera Anyuta (Chinese Theatre, 6 September [OS 26 August], 1772) was created to the text by Mikhail Ivanovich Popov. Music was a selection of popular songs specified in the libretto. It is a story about a girl called Anyuta, brought up in a peasants’ household, who in fact turned out to be of noble birth, and the story of her love for a nobleman, Victor, eventually ending happily, with wedding bells ringing. The score does not survive and the composer of it is unknown, however, sometimes it was attributed to Vasily Pashkevich or even to Yevstigney Fomin who that time was just 11 years old.

The music of another successful Russian opera Melnik – koldun, obmanshchik i svat (The Miller who was a Wizard, a Cheat and a Match-maker, text by Alexander Ablesimov, Moscow, 1779), on a subject resembling Rousseau’s Le Devin du village, is attributed to a theatre violin player and conductor Mikhail Matveyevich Sokolovsky (c. 1756–?). Later the music was revised by Yevstigney Fomin.

Vasily Pashkevich (1742–1797), a Russian composer was famous for his comic opera The Miser. Its roles are: Scriagin, Liubima’s guardian; Liubima, his niece; Milovid, her beloved; Marfa, the servant girl that Scriagin is in love with; Prolaz, Milovid’s manservant who is in Scriagin’s service. Accordingly the speech and the names of the characters of Molière's comedy were turned into Russian as well as the music that combines some features of Western form with typically Russian melodies. Another his opera Fevey was written to the libretto by Catherine II. Other operas are: The Carriage Accident (Neschastye ot karety, 1779 Saint Petersburg, Karl Kniper Theatre, St Petersburg Bazaar (Sankt Peterburgskiy Gostinyi Dvor, 1782 Saint Petersburg), Kniper Theatre, The Burden Is Not Heavy if It Is Yours (Svoya nosha ne tyanet, 1794), The Early Reign of Oleg (Nachal'noye upravleniye Olega, libretto by Catherine II, 1790 Saint Petersburg)– together with Giuseppe Sarti and C. Cannobio), Fedul and His Children (Fedul s det'mi, libretto by Catherine II, 1791 Saint Petersburg) – together with Martin y Soler), The Pasha of Tunis (Pasha tunisskiy, 1782 libretto by Mikhail Matinsky) and You Shall Be Judged As You Lived (Kak pozhivyosh', tak i proslyvyosh, 1792) — rev. of St Petersburg Bazaar.

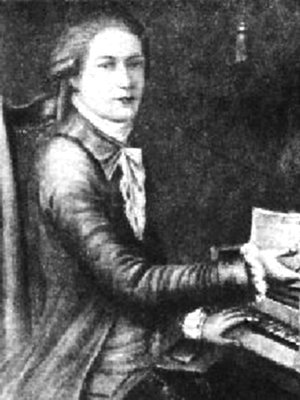
Yevstigney Fomin

Italian-trained Yevstigney Fomin (1761–1800) composed about 30 operas including the most successful opera-melodrama Orfey i Evridika to the text by Yakov Knyazhnin. Among his other operas are: The Novgorod Hero Boyeslayevich (Novgorodskiy bogatyr’ Boyeslayevich, text by Catherine II, 1786 Saint Petersburg), The Coachmen at the Relay Station (Yamshchiki na podstave 1787 Saint Petersburg), Soirées (Vecherinki, ili Gaday, gaday devitsa, 1788 Saint Petersburg), Magician, Fortune-teller and Match-maker (Koldun, vorozheya i svakha 1789 Saint Petersburg), The Miller who was a Wizard, a Cheat and a Match-maker (Melnik – koldun, obmanshchik i svat, 1779 Moscow, originally: Mikhail Sokolovsky), The Americans (Amerikantsy, comic opera, 1800 Saint Petersburg), Chloris and Milo (Klorida i Milon, 1800 Saint Petersburg), and The Golden Apple (Zolotoye yabloko, 1803 Saint Petersburg).

== 19th century ==
The 19th century was the golden age of Russian opera. It began with a success of a massive and slowly developing operatic project: the opera Lesta, dneprovskaya rusalka and its three sequels (1803–1807, first in Saint Petersburg) based on the German romantic-comic piece Das Donauweibchen by Ferdinand Kauer (1751–1831) with the Russian text and additional music by Russianized Venetian immigrant Catterino Cavos (1775–1840) and Stepan Davydov (1777–1825).

The next success was a patriotic opera Ivan Susanin (1815) by Cavos based on an episode from Russian history.

This success was continued with the brilliant operatic career of Alexey Verstovsky (1799–1862), who composed more 30 opera-vaudevilles and 6 grand-operas including Askold's Grave (Askoldova mogila, first performed in 1835) that received about 200 performances in Saint Petersburg and 400 in Moscow only for the first 25 years.

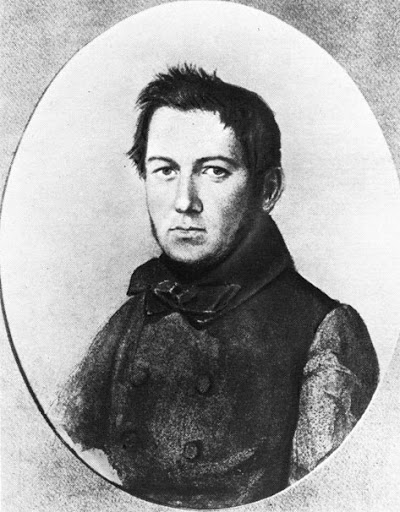
Mikhail Glinka

However the most important events in the history of Russian opera were two great operas by Mikhail Glinka (1804–1857) A Life for the Tsar, (Zhizn za tsarya, originally entitled Ivan Susanin 1836) and Ruslan and Lyudmila (based on the tale by Alexander Pushkin, 1842. These two works inaugurated a new era in Russian music and a burgeoning of Russian national opera.

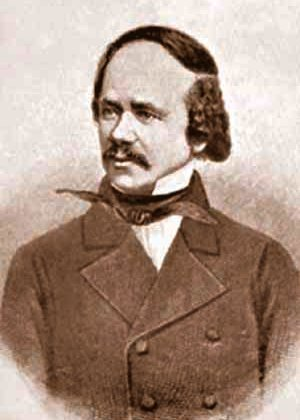
Alexander Dargomyzhsky

Since these, opera became a leading genre for the most of Russian composers. Glinka was followed by Alexander Dargomyzhsky (1813–1869) with his Rusalka (1856) and revolutionary The Stone Guest (Kamenny gost, completed by Rimsky-Korsakov and premiered in 1872).

Other composers were:

- Semen Hulak-Artemovsky (1813–1873) with his 3 operas including Zaporozhets za Dunayem (1863);
- Alexander Serov (1820–1871) with his Judith (1863) Rogneda (1865) The Power of the Fiend (Vrazhya sila, 1871);
- Anton Rubinstein (1829–1894) with his 19 operas including The Demon (1875 Saint Petersburg);
- César Cui (1835–1918), with his 14 operas including William Ratcliff (1861–1868);
- Eduard Nápravník (1839–1916), with his 4 operas including Dubrovsky (1895);
- Sergei Taneyev (1856–1915), with Oresteia, (1895, Saint Petersburg);
- Anton Arensky (1861–1906), with his 3 operas including A Dream on the Volga (1880).

Russian opera reached its apogee with the works by Modest Mussorgsky and his antipode Pyotr Tchaikovsky.

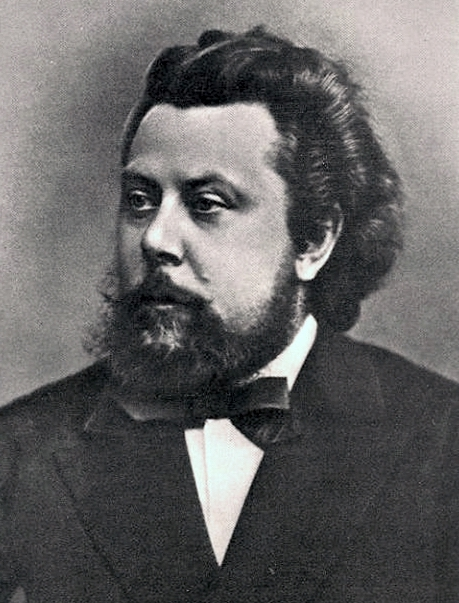
Modest Mussorgsky

Pyotr Tchaikovsky

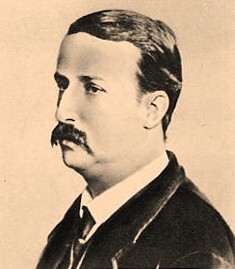
Aleksandr Borodin

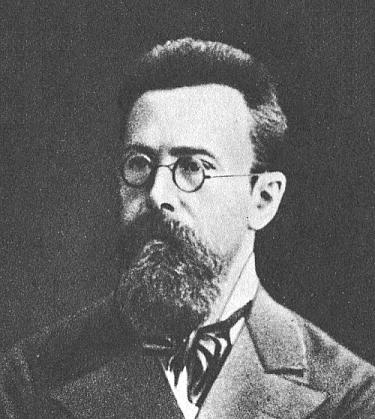
Nikolay Rimsky-Korsakov

Modest Mussorgsky's (1839–1881) Boris Godunov remains the greatest masterpiece of Russian opera, despite what many consider to be serious technical faults and a bewildering array of versions (Original Version of 1869, Revised Version of 1872, Rimsky-Korsakov Edition of 1908, Shostakovich Edition of 1940, etc.). His other operas were left unfinished:

- Salammbô (1866)
- Zhenit'ba (The Marriage, 1868)
- Khovanshchina (1872–1880)
- The Fair at Sorochyntsi (1874–1880)

Pyotr Tchaikovsky (1840–1893) completed ten operas including the most famous Eugene Onegin (Yevgeny Onegin), 1877–1878, 1879 Moscow and The Queen of Spades (Pikovaya dama), 1890, 1890 Saint Petersburg, which now belong to the world's standard repertoire. His other operas are:

- Voyevoda (The Voivode), 1867–1868, destroyed by the composer, but posthumously reconstructed
- Undina (or Undine), 1869, not completed, partly destroyed by the composer
- The Oprichnik, 1870–1872, 1874 Saint Petersburg
- Vakula the Smith (Kuznets Vakula), 1874, 1876 Saint Petersburg
- The Maid of Orleans (Orleanskaya deva), 1878–1879, 1881 Saint Petersburg
- Mazepa 1881–1883, 1884 Moscow
- Cherevichki (rev. of Vakula the Smith) 1885, 1887 Moscow
- The Enchantress (also The Sorceress or Charodeyka), 1885–1887, 1887 Saint Petersburg
- Iolanta (Iolanthe), 1891, 1892 Saint Petersburg

Not less important was Aleksandr Borodin’s (1833–1887) Prince Igor – (Knyaz Igor, completed by Rimsky-Korsakov and Alexander Glazunov, 1890).

Prolific Nikolai Rimsky-Korsakov (1844–1908) completed fifteen operas, the most significant achievements of the art of opera in Russia at the end of the century. The most notable of them are:

- May Night (Majskaja noch) 1878–1879
- The Snow Maiden (Snegurochka 1881 1st version, premiered 1882, Saint Petersburg; c. 1895 2nd version)
- Sadko (1896, premiered 1898, Moscow)
- The Tsar's Bride (Tsarskaya nevesta 1898, premiered 1899, Moscow)
- The Tale of Tsar Saltan (Skazka o tsare Saltane, premiered 1900, Moscow)
- Kashchey the Immortal (Kashchey bessmertny, 1902)
- The Legend of the Invisible City of Kitezh and the Maiden Fevroniya (Skazanie o nevidimom grade Kitezhe i deve Fevronii, 1904)
- The Golden Cockerel (Zolotoy petushok, 1907)

The last three of them already belong to the 20th-century Russian opera.

There were built a lot of new opera theatres including Bolshoi Theatre (opened since 1825 Moscow), and Mariinsky Theatre, opened since 1860 Saint Petersburg).

The history of 19th century Russian opera could be observed in the selected list of premieres at the Saint Petersburg theatres:

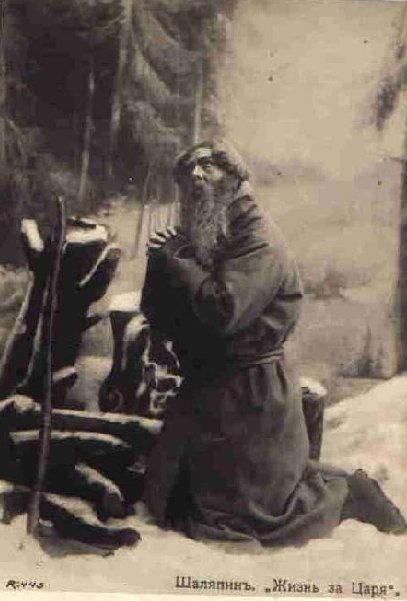
Feodor Chaliapin as Ivan Susanin in Glinka's A Life for the Tsar

Bolshoi Kamenny Theatre

- 1835 – Askold's Grave
- 1836 – A Life for the Tsar
- 1842 – Ruslan and Lyudmila
- 1856 – Rusalka

Mariinsky Theatre (since 1860)

- 1863 – Judith
- 1865 – Rogneda
- 1871 – The Power of the Fiend (Vrazya sila)
- 1872 – The Stone Guest
- 1874 – Boris Godunov
- 1874 – The Oprichnik
- 1875 – The Demon
- 1876 – Vakula the Smith
- 1881 – The Maid of Orleans
- 1882 – The Snow Maiden
- 1886 – Khovanshchina
- 1886 – Prince Igor
- 1887 – The Enchantress (Charodeyka)
- 1890 – The Queen of Spades

Mamontov's Private Russian Opera established in 1885. Savva Mamontov discovered talent of Chaliapin, commissioned designs from Mikhail Vrubel, Konstantin Korovin, Natalia Goncharova and Ivan Bilibin, staged the late operas by Rimsky Korsakov.

Opera spread to the provincial centres of Kiev (1867), Odessa (1887) and Kharkiv (1880).

== 20th century ==
The political collisions of the 20th century divided Russian opera composers into those who managed to escape to the West, successfully or not, and those who continued to live in not the particular friendly atmosphere of the Soviet and Post-Soviet regimes. And nevertheless, the process of producing new operas was not diminished, but just the opposite, it was immensely grown.

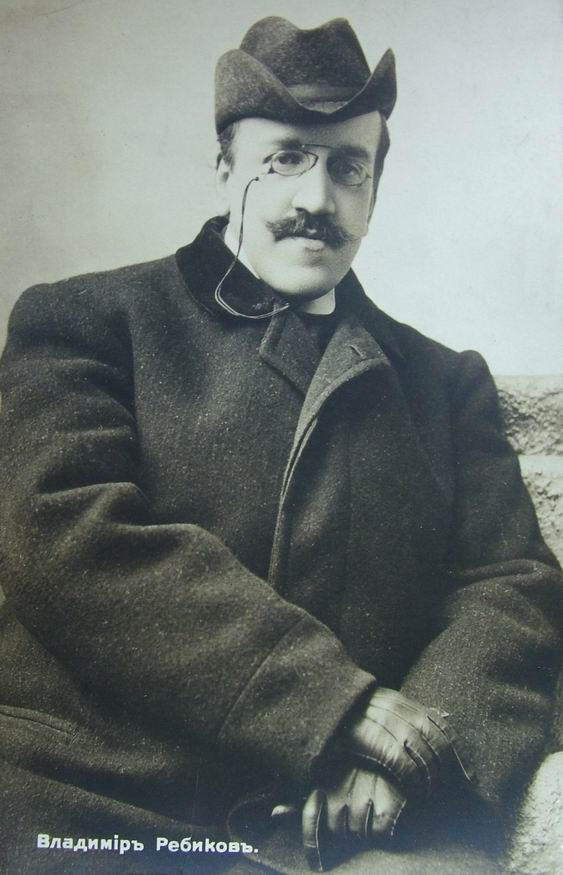
Vladimir Rebikov

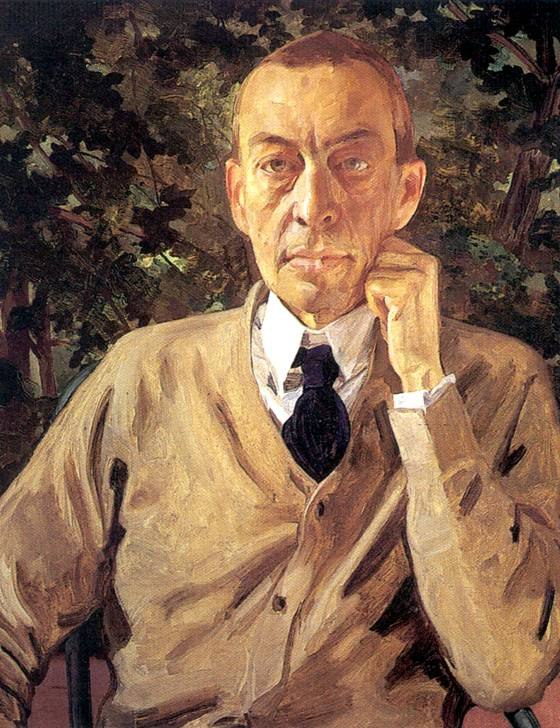
Sergei Rachmaninoff

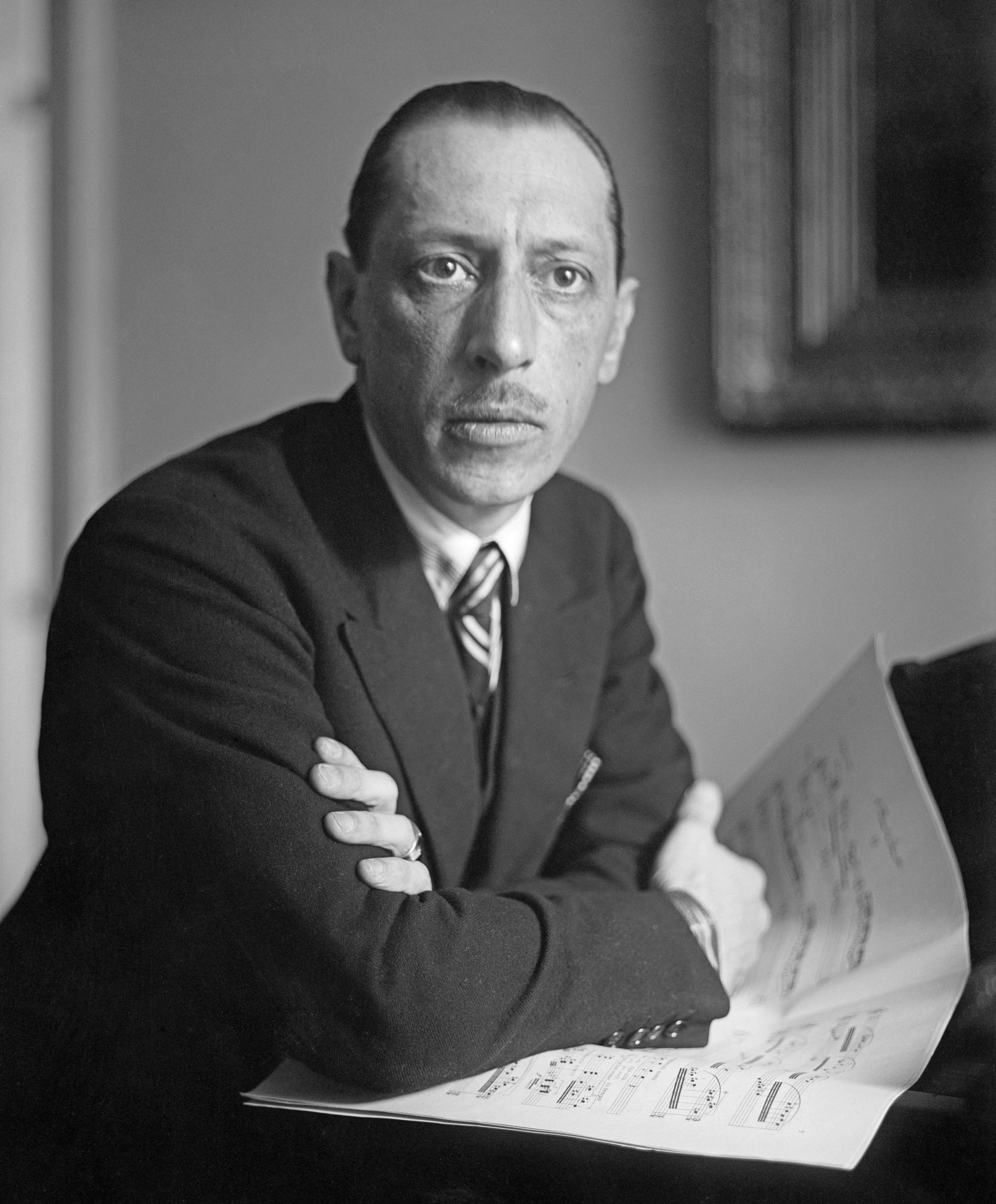
Igor Stravinsky

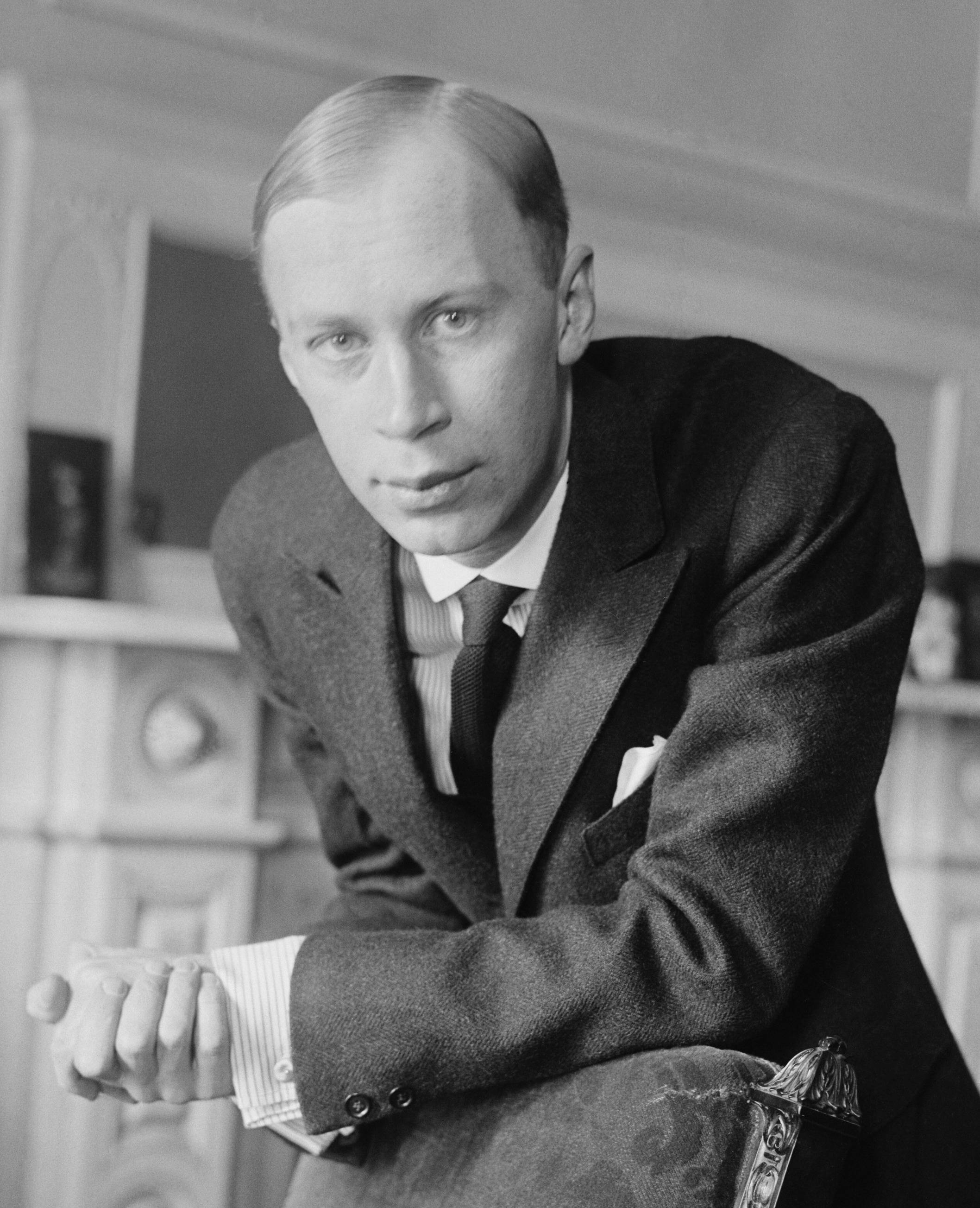
Sergei Prokofiev

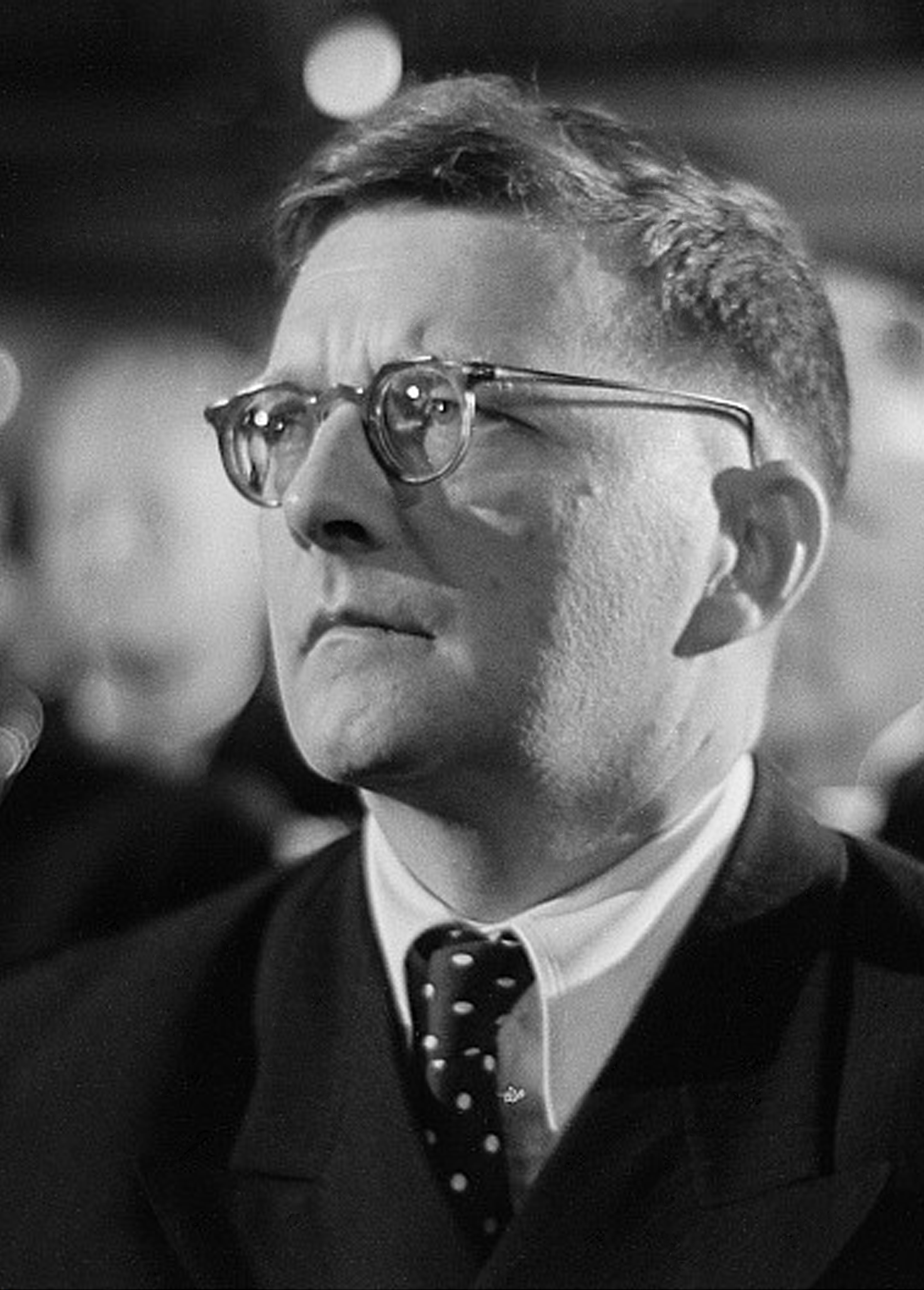
Dmitri Shostakovich

Zimin Opera established in 1904, Sergei Diaghilev's Saisons Russes began in Paris in 1913.

Vladimir Rebikov (1866–1920) composer of more than 10 operas is best of all known for his opera The Christmas Tree (Yolka, 1894–1902) in which he presented his ideas of "melo-mimics" and "rhythm-declamation" (see melodeclamation).

Sergey Rachmaninoff (1873–1943) completed three operas:

- Aleko (1892, staged 1893)
- The Miserly Knight (Skupoy Rytsar Op. 24, 1904)
- Francesca da Rimini (Op. 25, 1904, staged 1906).

All three operas were staged at the Bolshoi Theatre. He began but did not finish the fourth Monna Vanna (1907, 1st act in a vocal score) after Maurice Maeterlinck who refused to give permission to the composer for use of his text. These operas, written on the border between two centuries, rather belong to the world of the romantic opera of the past. Escaping Russia in 1917 Rachmaninoff never returned to operatic projects again.

Unlike him, Igor Stravinsky (1882–1971) had been returning to this genre again and again, full of fresh and innovative ideas. Sometimes it is difficult to qualify these works as pure operas but rather "opera-ballets", "opera-cantatas", or "music theatre". Here is the list:

- Le rossignol (The Nightingale) (1914)
- Renard, burlesque for 4 pantomimes and Chamber Orchestra (1916) opera-ballet
- Histoire du Soldat for chamber group and three speakers (1918), narration with music
- Mavra (1922)
- Oedipus rex (1927)
- Perséphone for speaker, soloists, chorus and orchestra (1934)
- Babel (1944)
- The Rake's Progress (1951)
- The Flood (1962)

Sergei Prokofiev’s (1891–1953) operas are full of humour, wit, and novelty. Here is the list of his completed operas:

- Maddalena, (1911–1913)
- The Gambler (1915–1916, rev. 1927)
- The Love for Three Oranges (1919)
- The Fiery Angel (1919–1927)
- Semyon Kotko (1939)
- Betrothal in a Monastery (1940–1941)
- War and Peace (1941–1952)
- The Story of a Real Man, Op. 117 (1947–1948)

Dmitri Shostakovich (1906–1975) was another great opera composer struggling all his life in the clutch of the communist ideology. His satirical opera The Nose, after the completely absurd story by Gogol was criticized in 1929 by RAPM as "formalist". His second opera Lady Macbeth of the Mtsensk District performed in 1934 with an enormous success was condemned by the authorities even more harshly. This forced him to recompose it much later, in 1962, as Katerina Izmailova in a style more simplified and conventional to meet the requirements of the new rulers of the regime. Shostakovich was involved in many more operatic projects.

There were a lot more of the composers about the same generation, who had managed to create hundreds of operas. Some of them shared the same problems with Shostakovich and Prokofiev who returned to live in Soviet Russia and were deadly embraced by its suffocative regime. Others were on the opposite side, serving the suffocating roles. A serious condemnation and persecution of the Soviet Union's foremost composers, such as Prokofiev, Shostakovich and many others, had emerged in 1948 in connection to the opera by Vano Muradeli (1908–1970), Velikaya druzhba (The Great Friendship); see Zhdanov Doctrine.

Here is just a shortlist of the opera composers of those times:

- Yuri Shaporin (1887–1966), opera The Decembrists (written during a period of 33 years 1920–1953, staged 1953)
- Isaak Dunayevsky (1900–1955), 14 operettas including White Acacia (1955)
- Alexander Mossolov (1900–1973), 4 operas including. The Barrage (1929–1930)
- Vissarion Shebalin (1902–1963), 3 operas including The Taming of the Shrew (1957)
- Dmitri Kabalevsky (1904–1987), 7 operas including Colas Breugnon (1936–1976)
- Veniamin Fleishman (1913–1941), opera Rothschild's Violin (1941) completed and orchestrated by Dmitri Shostakovich
- Tikhon Khrennikov (1913–2007), 5 operas including "Into the Storm" (1936–1939)
- Grigory Frid (1915–2012), 2 chamber mono-operas including The Diary of Anne Frank (1968)
- Mieczysław Weinberg (1919–1996), 7 operas including The Portrait (1980) and The Idiot (1985)

Also: Vladimir Shcherbachev, Sergei Vasilenko, Vladimir Fere, Vladimir Vlasov, Kirill Molchanov, Alexander Kholminov, etc. (see: Russian opera articles#20th century).

The next generations who found themselves already in the Post-Stalin epoch had their own specific problems. The ideological and stylistic control and limitation of creative freedom by the authorities and older colleagues-composers in the hierarchical structures of the Union of Composers made almost impossible the innovation and experiment in any field of musical art. It was a feeling that old bad times returned again when in 1979 at the Sixth Congress of the Composers' Union, its leader Tikhon Khrennikov denounced seven composers (thereafter known as the "Khrennikov Seven"), who for some reason or other had been played in the West – there were at least 4 opera composers among them.

As a result, even quite new phenomena appeared: a "samizdat (underground) opera" (see Nikolai Karetnikov). Some of these operas still never been performed, others luckily received their premieres in the West, and only a few found their place at the operatic stages of the homeland. The collapse of the Soviet Union did not improve this hopeless situation much.

The list of the composers who contributed to the development of Russian opera nearer to the end of the 20th century:

- Edison Denisov (1929–1996), 3 Operas including L'écume des jours (The Foam of Days, completed 1981)
- Nikolai Karetnikov (1930–1994), 2 operas including Till Eulenspiegel, opera in two acts (1965–1985)
- Sergei Slonimsky (born 1932), 3 operas including Mary Stewart (1978–1980)
- Rodion Shchedrin (1932–2025), 5 operas including Myortvye dushi (Dead Souls 1976)
- Alfred Schnittke (1934–1998), 3 operas including Zhizn’ s idiotom (Life with an Idiot, 1990–1991)
- Boris Tishchenko (b. 1939) 2 operas including Kradenoe solntse (The Stolen Sun, 1968)
- Alexander Knaifel (born 1943) 2 operas including Kentervilskoye prividenie (The Canterville Ghost, 1965–1966)
- Nikolai Korndorf (1947–2001), chamber opera MR (Marina and Rainer) (1989)
- Elena Firsova (born 1950), 2 chamber operas including The Nightingale and the Rose

Also: Nikolai Sidelnikov, Andrei Petrov, Sandor Kallosh, Leonid Hrabovsky, Alexander Vustin, Gleb Sedelnikov, Merab Gagnidze, Alexander Tchaikovsky, Vasily Lobanov, Dmitri N. Smirnov, Leonid Bobylev, Vladimir Tarnopolsky, and so on (see: Russian opera articles#20th century).

== 21st century ==
The Russian opera is continuing its development in the 21st century. It began with the noisy premieres of two comic operas, whose genre could be described as "opera-farce":

The first was Tsar Demyan – a frightful opera performance (a collective project of the five participants: composers Leonid Desyatnikov and Vyacheslav Gaivoronsky from Saint Petersburg, Iraida Yusupova and Vladimir Nikolayev from Moscow, and the creative collective "Kompozitor," (a pseudonym for the well-known music critic Pyotr Pospelov) to the libretto by Elena Polenova after a folk-drama Tsar Maksimilyan, premiere 20 June 2001 Mariinski Theatre, Saint Petersburg. Prize "Gold Mask, 2002" and "Gold Soffit, 2002".

Another opera The Children of Rosenthal by Leonid Desyatnikov to the libretto by Vladimir Sorokin, was commissioned by the Bolshoi Theatre and premiered on 23 March 2005.

== List of Russian opera theatres ==
- "Comedie et opere", (small hall in a wing of Zimniy Dvorets – The Winter Palace, from 1735 St Petersburg)
- Theatre of Letniy Sad (Summer Garden, from 1735 St Petersburg)
- Opera House (with 1000 seats, at Zimniy Dvorets – The Winter Palace, from 1743, St Petersburg)
- Moscow Theatre (built 1742 for the coronation of Elizaveta Petrovna, Moscow)
- Kuskovo Summer Theatre (from 1755, Kuskovo near Moscow)
- Karl Kniper Theatre (1777–1797 St Petersburg)
- Chinese Opera Theatre (from 1779, Tsarskoe Selo near St Petersburg)
- Petrovsky Theatre (with 1000 seats, from 1780 to 1805, Moscow)
- Bolshoi Kamenny Theatre (1783–1811, St Petersburg)
- Hermitage Theatre (from 1785 St Petersburg)
- Ostankino Theatre (from 22 July 1795, Ostankino near Moscow)
- Imperial Kamenny Theatre or the Bolshoi Theatre of Saint Petersburg (St Petersburg)
- Petrovka Theatre (from 1786 to 1805 Moscow)
- Bolshoi Theatre (from 1825 Moscow)
- Kamenny Island Theatre (from 1826 St Petersburg)
- Mariinsky Theatre, (from 1860 St Petersburg)

== See also ==
- List of Russian opera singers
- Music of Russia#18th and 19th century: Russian classical music
- Russian culture#Opera
- Opera#Russian opera
- Comic opera#Russian comic opera

== Bibliography ==
- Abraham, Gerald: The Concise Oxford History of Music, Oxford 1979 ISBN 0-19-284010-X
- [Abramovsky A.] Абрамовский А. Русская опера до Глинки Moscow 1940
- [Aseev B. N.] Асеев Б. Н. Русский драматический театр XVII – XVIII веков. Moscow 1958
- [Berkov P. N.] Берков П. Н. Русская комедия и комическая опера XVIII века. М. – Л., 1950
- [Findeizein N. F.] Финдейзен Н. Ф. Очерки по истории музыки в России. т. 2, М.-Л. 1929
- [Gozenpud A. A.] Гозенпуд А. А., Музыкальный театр в России Л., 1959 г.
- [Gurevich L.] Гуревич Л. История русского театрального быта, т.1. М. – Л., 1939
- [Druskin M.] Друскин М. Очерк VI в кн. Очерки по истории русской музыки. Л., 1956
- [History of Russian Music] История русской музыки в 10 томах, т. 2, 3. Moscow 1984
- [Keldysh Yu. V.] Келдыш Ю. В. Русская музыка XVIII века Moscow 1965
- [Livanova T. N.] Ливанова Т. Н. Русская музыкальная культура XVIII века в ее связях с литературой, театром и бытом в 2-х томах 1952–1953 гг. т.1, т.2
- [Rabinovich A. S.] Рабинович А.С. Русская опера до Глинки Moscow 1948
- [Rapatskaya L. A.] Рапацкая Л.А. Русское искусство XVIII века Moscow 1995
- [Serov A. N.] Серов А. Н. Опера в России и русская опера // Серов А.Н. Критические статьи. Т. 4. Спб. 1965
- Taruskin, Richard: Russia in 'The New Grove Dictionary of Opera', ed. Stanley Sadie (London, 1992) ISBN 0-333-73432-7
- Frolova-Walker, Marina: Russian Federation, 1730–1860, Opera; Powell, Jonathan: 1860–90, Opera; Barttlett, Rosamund (Music of the Soviet Period) in the entry Russian Federation, The Grove Dictionary of Music and Musicians, vol. 21 ISBN 0-333-60800-3
