= Russian Theatre, or Complete Collection of All Russian Theatrical Works =

Collection of Russian theatrical works

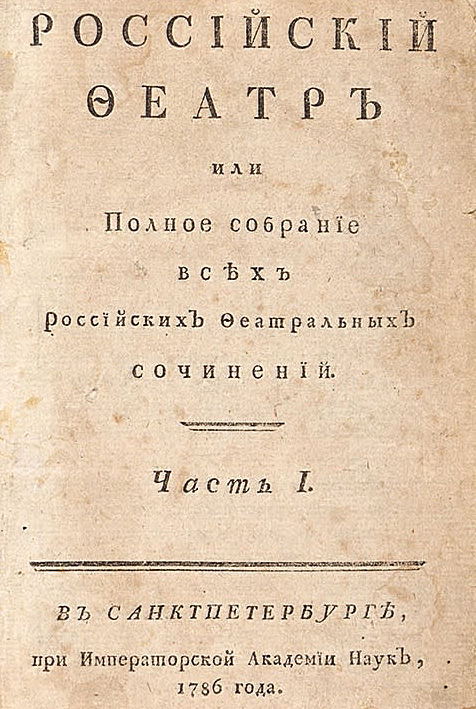
«Российский Ѳеатръ» или «Полное собрание всѣхъ Россійскихъ Ѳеатральныхъ сочиненій»

Russian Theatre or Complete Collection of All Russian Theatrical Works («Российский Ѳеатръ» или «Полное собраніе всѣхъ Россійскихъ Ѳеатральныхъ сочиненій») was a publication of the Imperial Academy of Sciences in Saint Petersburg from 1786 to 1794.

Russian Theatre was published in Saint Petersburg, the capital of the Russian Empire, and a total of 43 parts appeared.

The publication was conceived by Princess Yekaterina Romanovna Dashkova, director of the Imperial Academy of Sciences and chair of the Russian Academy, to collect both previously published and manuscript Russian plays in a single corpus.

The aim of the project was to compile a complete repertoire of plays in the Russian language—both those already printed and previously unpublished, whether original, adapted, or simply translated. The publication is organized systematically: first come tragedies, followed by dramas, comedies, and comic operas.

The series included according to the Brockhaus-Efron works by Alexander Ablesimov, Ippolit Bogdanovich, Denis Fonvizin, Vyazmitinov, Catherine II, A. Klushin (ru), Yakov Knyazhnin, E. Kostrov, I. Krylov, Vasily Lyovshin, M. V. Lomonosov, V. Lukin (ru), Vasily Maykov, I. Mikhailov (И. Михайлов) [?], P. Plavilstshchikov (ru), Pavel Potemkin, M. Prokudin (ru), Alexander Sumarokov, Trediakovsky, D. I. Khvostov, Kheraskov, and others.

The 39th part of the Complete Collection of All Russian Theatrical Works, published in 1793, contained a tragedy by Yakov Knyazhnin, Вадим Новгородский (Vadim of Novgorod), which was also separately published. The tragedy was judged “dangerous” by the censorship authorities, which ordered “the strictest investigation regarding the author and the publication of his tragedy.” Copies were confiscated and destroyed. As a result, a complete copy of part 39 of Russian Theatre and the separately printed tragedy were already major bibliographical rarities by the early 19th century.

== Notable works ==
Notable works published in Russian Theatre include:

- Mikhail Lomonosov:

Temira i Selim («Темира и Селим» Temira and Selim) (tragedy)

- Alexander Sumarokov:

Sinav i Truvor («Синав и Трувор» Sinav and Truvor) (tragedy)
Khorev («Хорев» Khorev) (tragedy)
Tresotinius («Тресотиниус» Tresotinius) (comedy)

- Catherine II:

Vot kakovo imet korzinu i bel («Вот каково иметь корзину и бель» Now that's what it is to have a basket and linen) (comedy)

- N. P. Nikolev:

Samolyubivyy stikhotvorets («Самолюбивый стихотворец» The Self-Loving Poet) (comedy)
Rozina i Lyubim («Розина и Любим» Rozina and Lyubim) (drama with voices)

- V. I. Lukin (ru):

Mot lyubovyu ispravlennyy («Мот, любовью исправленный» the Rake Corrected by Love) (comedy)
Shchepetilnik («Щепетильник» The Trinket Dealer ) (comedy)

- D. I. Fonvizin:

Nedorosl («Недоросль» The Minor) (comedy)

- Ya. B. Knyazhnin:

Neschastie ot karety («Несчастие от кареты» Misfortune from a Coach) (comic opera)

- M. I. Popov:

Anyuta («Анюта» Anyuta) (comedy)

- A. O. Ablesimov:

Dialog stranniki («Диалог Странники» Dialog The Wanderers) (comedy)

- Ya. B. Knyazhnin:

Sbitenshchik («Сбитенщик» Sbiten Seller) (comedy)
Vadim Novgorodskiy («Вадим Новогородский» Vadim of Novgorod; confiscated and burned by order of Catherine II) (tyrannicide tragedy)

== Bibliography ==
- Лисовский Н. М. «Российский Феатр» // Brockhaus and Efron Encyclopedic Dictionary, 86 vols. (82 vols. + 4 supplementary). St. Petersburg, 1890–1907.
  - Неустроев А. Н. (ru), «Исторические разыскания» (страницы 435—444).
  - Русская старина (1871, vol. III).
