= Catherine the Great and opera =

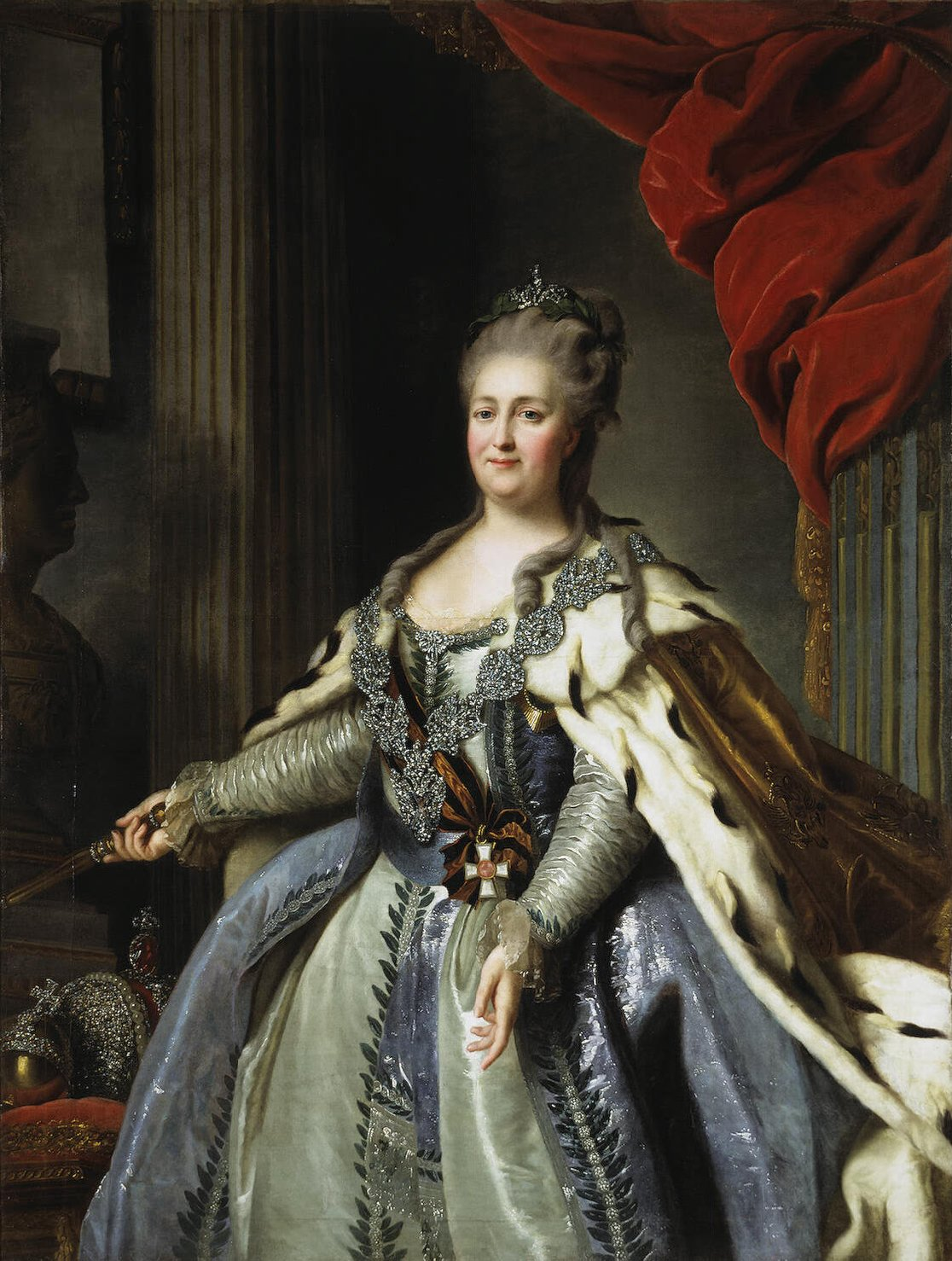
Catherine II of Russia (1729–1796), not only patroness, but also opera librettist

Catherine II the Great (1729–1796), Empress of Russia was not only an opera fan, a patroness of the arts, music and theatre, but also an opera librettist. She commissioned some well-known Russian and foreign composers to provide music for her texts.

The Imperial opera and ballet theatre were founded by imperial decree in 1783, and the Bolshoi Kamenny Theatre was built in St Petersburg for opera and ballet performances that surpassed the great European theatres in their brilliance and luxury.

She wrote nine opera texts in addition to fourteen comedies, seven proverbs (short plays), and other dramatic writings. In writing these texts she was supervised by other writers including Ivan Perfilevich Elagin, and Alexander Vasilyevich Khrapovitsky.

She was intelligent enough to be self-critical, stating in her letter to Voltaire that her dramatic works were weak in plot and ill-sustained in intrigue, but natural and true in their characterization.

She chose Vasily Pashkevich to compose music for her dramatic fairy tale Fevey. This was staged on April 30 [OS April 19], 1786 at the Hermitage Theatre in St Petersburg. The lavish opera production evoked widespread admiration.

The Italian-trained composer Yevstigney Fomin was chosen to compose an opera-ballet to her libretto The Novgorod Hero Boyeslayevich (Новгородский богатырь Боеслаевич – Novgorodskiy bogatyr’ Boyeslayevich, staged on December 8 [OS October 27], 1786 at St Petersburg).

The subject of the fairy tale on Fuflych-Bogatyr (Fuflych Unfortunate Hero) was suggested by Count Orlov. Catherine made this a parody on her cousin Gustav III, King of Sweden. The libretto was set to music by Vicente Martin y Soler, a Spanish composer settled in Russia in 1788. The opera Gore-Bogatyr Kosometovich (Горе-Богатырь Косометович – The Unfortunate Hero Kosometovich March 30 [OS February 9], 1789 Hermitage Theatre, St Petersburg) with an overture on three Russian tunes had a great success and Great Princes Alexander and Konstantin knew it by heart. However Catherine, to avoid a political scandal, put a note in the printed libretto “Do not perform in the Town Theatre for the foreign ministers”. Prince Potemkin who attended the third performance of the opera agreed to this.

Catherine wished the famous Domenico Cimarosa to set her drama on the subject from early history of Russia, The Early Reign of Oleg (1786), but he was too slow, and she replaced him with Giuseppe Sarti, who composed music for the play's fifth Act. Along with these contributions, the work included contributions of music by Pashkevich (who contributed choruses for the third Act) and Milanese musician C. Cannobio (who contributed a sinfonia, 4 orchestral entr’actes, a march, and a minuet). The work was first staged on November 2, [OS October 22] 1790 at the Hermitage Theatre.

The opera to her libretto Fedul s det'mi (Федул с детьми – Fedul and his Children was written by Vasily Pashkevich with Martin y Soler) and premiered on January 27 ([OS January 16]), 1791 in St Petersburg.

== Dramatic works ==
- О время! комедия в трех действиях – O vremya! also O Tempora! (O Time!), a comedy in three acts
- Именины г-жи Ворчалкиной, комедия в пяти действиях –Imeniny gospozhi Vorchalkinoy (Mrs Grumble’s Birthday), a comedy in five acts
- Передняя знатного боярина, комедия в одном действии - Perednyaya znatnogo boyarina (The Waiting Room of the Grang Boyard), a comedy in one act
- Госпожа Вестникова с семьею, комедия в одном действии – Gospozha Vestnikova s semyoyu (Mme Vestnikova and her Family), a comedy in one act
- Невеста-невидимка. комедия в одном действии – Nevesta-nevidimka (The Invisible Bride), a comedy in one act
- Вот каково иметь корзину и белье, комедия в пяти действиях –Vot kakovo imet’ korzinu I belyo (This is How to Have Both the Basket and the Linen), a comedy in five acts
- Разносторонняя семья осторожками и подозрениями, комедия в пяти действиях – Raznostoronnyaya semya ostorozhkami i podozraniyami (The Versatile Family), a comedy in five acts
- Недоразумение, комедия в пяти действиях – Nedorazumeniye (The Confusion), a comedy in five acts
- Обманщик, комедия в пяти действиях – Obmanshchik (The Twister), a comedy in five acts
- Обольщенный, комедия в пяти действиях – Obolshchonny (The Seduced), a comedy in five acts
- Шаман Сибирский, комедия в пяти действиях – Shaman Sibirsky (Siberian Shaman), a comedy in five acts
- Из жизни Рюрика, историческое представление – Iz zhizni Rurika (From Rurik’s Life), a historical drama
- Начальное управление Олега, историческое представление – Nachalnoye upravleniye Olega (The Early Reign of Oleg), a historical drama
- Новгородский богатырь Боеслаевич, комическая опера – Novgorodsky bogatyr Boeslaevich (The Novgorod Hero Boyeslayevich), a comic opera
- Горебогатырь Косометович, комическая опера – Gorebogatyr Kosometovich (The Unfortunate Hero Kosometovich), a comic opera
- Федул с детьми – Fedul s det’mi (Fedul and his Children)

== Prose ==
- Сказка о царевиче Хлоре, аллегорическая сказка – Skazka o tsareviche Khlore (The Story of Tsarevich Chlor), an allegorical fairy tale
- Сказка о царевиче Февее, аллегорическая сказка – Skazka o tsareviche Feveye The Story of Tsarevich Fevey, an allegorical fairy tale
- Письма Патрикея Правдомыслова– Pis’ma Patrikeya Pravdomyslova (The Letters of Patrikey Pravdomyslov)
- Письмо к господину Живописцу– Pis’mo k gospodinu Zhivopistsu (The Letter to Mr Painter)
- Были и Небылицы и связанные с ними полемические заметки – Byli I nebylitsy I svyazannye s nimi polemicheskiye zametki (The stories and Fables, and Polemical Notes Connected to Them)
- Общества незнающих, ежедневная записка – Obshchestva neznayushchihk, ezhednevnaya zapiska (The Societies of Ignorance, Everyday Notes)
- Тайна противонелепого общества – Tayna protivonelepogo obshchestva (The Mystery of the Absurd Society)

== Quotations ==
"In the composition of my comedies, I have taken all my conceptions of character exclusively from my own country, and thus, without quitting home, have found in it alone materials for satire sufficiently abundant for a pen far more practiced than I can ever hope to wield." (Catherine II the Great)

== See also ==
- Catherine the Great
- Russian opera
- Russian opera in the 18th century
