= Antoine Bullant =

Russian composer

Antoine Bullant, also Anton Bullandt (Russian: Антон Булландт or Антуан Бюлан, 9 February 1751 in Mělník, Bohemia, Holy Roman Empire – 25 [OS 13] June 1821 St Petersburg) was a bassoon player and opera composer who worked first in France but primarily in Imperial Russia. He was originally from Bohemia.

Antoine Bullant is also sometimes referred to as Jean Bullant (Жан Бюлан) or Anton Bullandt. However, most current scholarly sources refer to him as Antoine Bullant as all 18th-century printed and manuscript copies of his own works spell the name ‘Bullant’. In Russian his name was also transliterated as Булан, Булант, Буллант and sometimes "trans-transliterated" in other languages (e.g., in German, in lists of operas) as Bulant, Bullanto, Bullault, Bullandt, Bulan.

The Grove Dictionary of Music describes him as a French composer and bassoonist of Czech origin, born in Amiens (?), who in 1771 or 1772 settled in Paris, where he published four symphonies (1773) and some chamber instrumental ensembles.

There is some controversial information that Bullandt came to Russia in 1780, and entered the service in Imperial St Petersburg Theatres in 1783 and was a founder of "St Petersburg Philharmonic Society". Biographical data about him are scarce.

== Works ==
He wrote a large number of operas with Russian librettos, often within Russian national settings, some of which were written by Yakov Knyazhnin. The most successful of them was Sbitenshchik (Сбитеньщик — Sbiten Vendor), comic opera in 3 acts, written to the libretto by Yakov Knyazhnin. It was a remake of Molière's L'école des femmes. The opera was staged 1783 or 1784 in St Petersburg, at the Bolshoi Kamenny Theatre, and was played until 1853;

He was also credited for several famous comic operas of that time probably by mistake, because some of them, were also attributed to other composers like Ivan Kerzelli and Vasily Pashkevich):

- Lyubovnik - koldun (Любовник-колдун — The Lover-Magician, one-act opera, libretto by Nikolai Nikolev, 1772 Moscow), that was also attributed to Ivan Kerzelli;
- Gorbatye (Горбатые — The Hunchbacked People, 1779 St Petersburg);
- Torzhestvo dobrodeteli nad krasotoy (Торжество добродетели над красотой — Celebration of Virtues Above the Beauty 1780, St Petersburg);
- Kuznets (Кузнец — The Blacksmith, 1780 St Petersburg);
- Muzhya-zhenikhi svoikh zhon (Мужья-женихи своих жён — The Husbands-bride-grooms of their Wives, 1784 St Petersburg),
- Sbitenshchik (Сбитеньщик — Sbiten Vendor), comic opera in 3 acts, libretto: Yakov Knyazhnin after Molière, 1783 or 1784, St Petersburg, Bolshoi Kamenny Theatre;
- The Fisherman and Spirit (Рыбак и Дух — The Fisherman and Spirit, 1787);
- Milovzor and Prelesta (Миловзор и Прелеста, 1787);
- Dobrodetelny Volshebnik (Добродетельный волшебник — Virtuous Vizard), dramatic opera in 5 acts, libretto: Yakov Knyazhnin, Moscow, 1787;
- Gipsy (Цыган, 1788);
- Kak pozhivyosh, tak i proslyvyosh (Как поживёшь, так и прослывёшь — As you live you will be judged, libretto by Mikhail Matinsky, 1792 St. Petersburg) — revision of Saint-Petersburg's Trade Stalls that was also attributed to Vasily Pashkevich;
- Vinetta, ili Taras v Ulye (Винетта, или Тарас в улье — Vinetta, or Taras in a Beehive), comic opera in 2 acts, libretto: K. Damsky, 1799, St Petersburg;
- Skupoy (Скупой — The Miser), libretto by Yakov Knyazhnin after Molière, 1782?, 1811 St Petersburg & Moscow that was also attributed to Vasily Pashkevich;
- Pritvorno sumashedshaya (Притворно сумасшедшая — Hypocritically Mad Woman), etc.
