= Bullant =

Bullant may refer to:

- Antoine Bullant (1751–1821), (sometimes Bulant) an 18th-century Czech composer and musician that lived in France and Russia
- Jean Bullant (1515–1578), the French architect and sculptor.
- Joey Walker (born 1988), A musician also known by the name Bullant.
- Myrmecia (ant), commonly known as the bull ant.
