= Russian Theatre =

Russian Theatre may refer to:

- Russian Theatre, Tallinn, Russian theatre in Tallinn, Estonia
- Russian Theatre, Riga, Russian theatre in Riga, Latvia
- Russian Theatre (1766-1769), theatre in Moscow

== See also ==
- Russia Theatre
- Russian Theatre, or Complete Collection of All Russian Theatrical Works
