= Paškevičius =

- Lithuanian surname
- m.: Paškevičius
- f.: (unmarried): Paškevičiūtė
- f.: (married): Paškevičienė

Paškevičius is a Lithuanian-language surname from the Belarusian surname Pashkevich, which ultimately comes from the East Slav personal name Pashka, a diminutive of Pavel (Paul). Notable people with this surname include:

- Aldona Liobytė (Aldona Liobytė-Paškevičienė, 1915–1985), award-winning Lithuanian children's author, playwright, translator and actress
- Augustinas Paškevičius (1843-1914), Russian Imperial army general in medicine, activist of Lithuanian cultural society Rūta
- Marius Paškevičius (born 1979), Lithuanian judoka
- Ona Dokalskaitė-Paškevičienė (1912-2007), Lithuanian painter
