= Karl Knipper Theatre =

Former (1775–1797) performance venue in Saint Petersburg

Knipper Theatre, Kniper Theatre or Knieper Theatre (Russian: Театр Карла Книпера) was the venue of a German theatrical troupe led by Karl Knipper which performed in Saint Petersburg beginning in 1775, and ending in 1797.

== History ==
The theatre building was converted from a manège (riding school), located on the Tsaritsa Meadow (Russian: Царицын луг – Tsaritsyn lug, now Ploshchad Zhertv Revolutsii – The Place of the Victims of Revolution) near the present-day Tripartite Bridge. From 1770 to 1777 it was occupied by English comedians, until they were replaced with Karl Knipper's German troupe.

In 1779 Knipper signed a contract with the Foundling Home that established the Volny Rossiysky Teatre (Вольный Российский Театр – The Free Russian Theatre). As part of this contract the board of trustees of the Saint Petersburg chapter of the Foundling Home (Петербургский воспитательный дом or "educational home") sent Knipper 50 of its pupils to instruct and eventually incorporate into spectacles. The composer Vasily Pashkevich was the pupils' music instructor. From 1782 to 1783 the director of the theatre was the well-known Russian actor Ivan Dmitrevsky, who performed at his benefice the famous comedy Nedorosl (Russian: Недоросль – The Minor) by Denis Fonvizin (1782). Choreographer Gasparo Angiolini and ballet dancer Francesco Rosetti were briefly dance instructors.

On 12 July 1783 the Imperial Theaters acquired the building and later Knipper's German troupe as well, but the Free Russian Theatre was dissolved. The building was renamed the Gorodskoy Derevyanny Theatre (Russian: Городской деревянный театр – The Wooden Town Theatre) or Maly Theatre (Russian: Малый театр – Little Theatre). This existed until 1797, when it was dismantled at the demand of Paul I of Russia, because it was obstructing troop manoeuvring during parades.

== Repertoire ==
The repertoire of Knipper's German Theatre included:

- Pietro Alessandro Guglielmi: Robert und Kalliste
- Ernst Wilhelm Wolf: Die Dorfdeputierten
- Anton Schweitzer: Das Elysium
- Franz Andreas Holly: Der Bassa von Tunis
- Carl David Stegmann: Der Deserteur
- Johann Adam Hiller: Die Jagd
- Georg Benda: Der Walder
- Hiller: Die Jubelhochzeit
- Christian Gottlob Neefe: Die Apotheke
- Hiller: Die Liebe auf dem Lande
- Hiller: Der Dorfbarbier
- Hiller: Lottchen am Hofe
- Wolf: Das Grosse Los
- André Grétry: Lucile
- Stegman: Das redende Gemälde
- Niccolò Piccinni: Die Nacht

The repertoire of the Free Russian Theatre included the following operas:

- Vasily Pashkevich: Misfortune from a Coach (Несчастье от кареты – Neschastye ot karety, 7 November 1779, Saint Petersburg, libretto by Yakov Knyazhnin)
- Mikhail Sokolovsky: The Miller – a Wizard, a Cheat and a Match-maker (Мельник – колдун, обманщик и сват – Melnik – koldun, obmanshchik i svat to the text by Alexander Ablesimov, first in 1779 Moscow, c.1795 Saint Petersburg)
- Ivan Kerzelli: Rozana i Lyubim (Розана и Любим – Rozana and Lyubim, four-act opera, text by Nikolai Nikolev, first in 1778, Moscow)
- Vasily Pashkevich: The Saint-Petersburg Bazaar (Санкт-Петербургский Гостиный Двор – Sankt Peterburgskiy Gostinyi Dvor 1782 Saint Petersburg)
