= Fevey =

Fevey is an opera by Vasily Pashkevich to a Russian libretto by Catherine II of Russia.

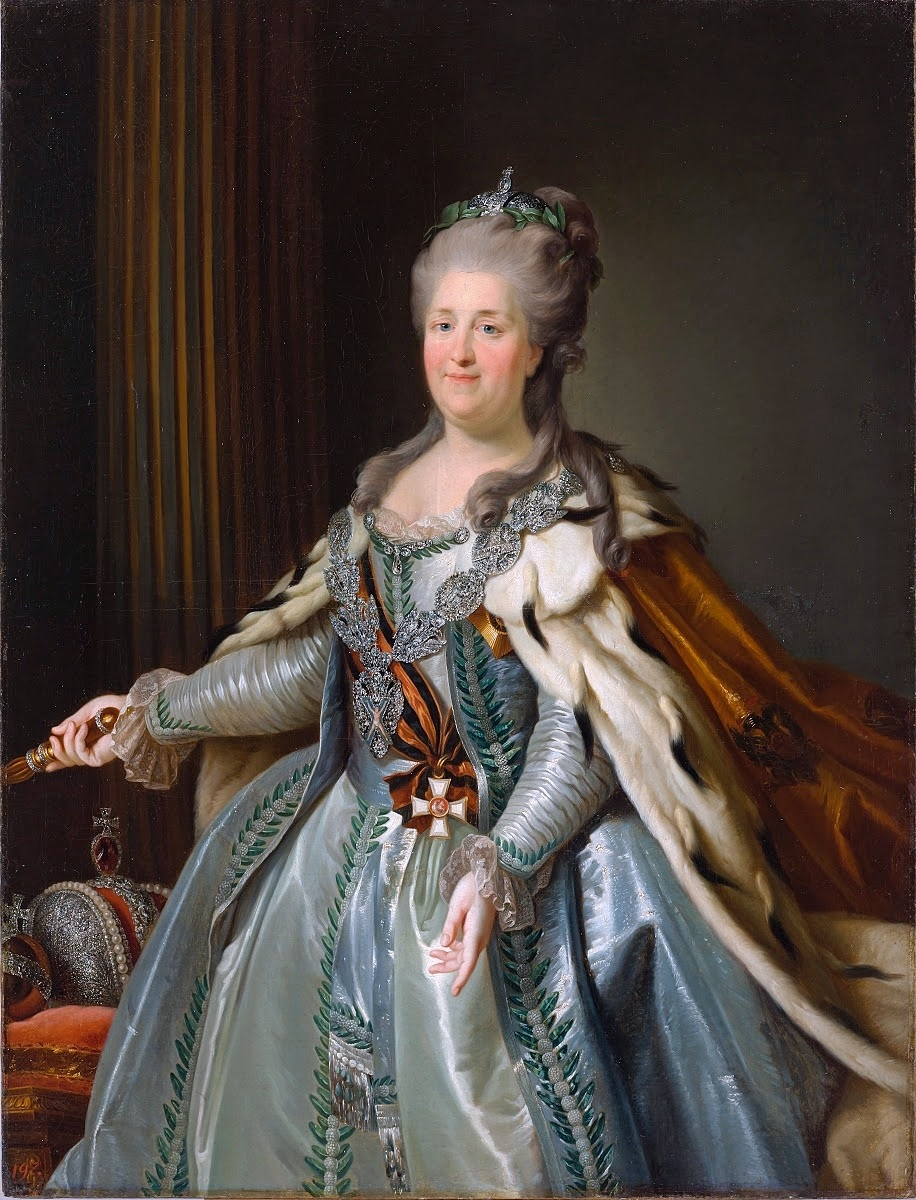
Catherine II

Empress Catherine II had literary ambitions and wrote nine opera librettos. This one, an allegorical fairy tale, was called The Story of Tsarevich Fevey (Russian: Сказка о царевиче Февее. Аллегорическая сказка). She asked Vasili Pashkevich, a Russian composer of Polish origin, to set it to music.

This is the first example of a Russian fairytale opera, a genre that eventually flourished in the 19th century. The plot of the opera is quite absurd, used as an instruction for the heir of her throne. However the intention was to amuse the audience, because people who cheer have no evil.

The premiere took place on April 30 [OS April 19], 1786 at the Hermitage Theatre in St Petersburg. The lavish opera production evoked widespread admiration.

== Discography ==
- Russkoe barokko - Zolotaya klassika (CD) Label(s): RCD Music RCD 30649 Year of production: 2003, Year of recording: 2003, Baroque Chamber Ensemble. Including:

Vasily Pashkevich. Overture to the opera Fevey Allegro C major 2:51
Vasily Pashkevich. Aria of Tsaritsa from the opera Fevey 2:56 (Libretto by Catherine II)
Vasily Pashkevich. Overture to the opera Fedul s det'mi Allegro C major 2:50

== See also ==
- Vasili Pashkevich
- Catherine II and opera
- Catherine the Great
- Russian opera
