= Mikhail Matinsky =

Russian composer, scientist and writer (1750 – c. 1820)

Mikhail Alexeyevich Matinsky (Russian: Михаил Алексеевич Матинский, 1750 – c. 1820) was a Russian scientist, dramatist, librettist and opera composer.

== Biography ==
Matinsky originated from the serfs of Count Sergey Yaguzhinsky and was born in Pavlovskoe. He studied in the gymnasium for the "raznochintsy" (educated non-nobles) at Moscow University and also in Italy. Later he taught mathematics at the Smolny Institute of Noble Maidens in Saint Petersburg.

His first literary work was a Russian translation of the German book, 'The Republic of Learned People, or an Allegorical and Critical Description of the Arts and Sciences,' by the Argentine statesman Cornelio Saavedra. Later, he worked on translating the fairytales of Christian Fürchtegott Gellert.

He published several books, The Description of Measures and Weights of Different Countries (Saint Petersburg 1779), The Fundamentals of Geometry (Saint Petersburg 1798), and The Concise Universal Geography (Saint Petersburg 1800). He also translated the comedy The Churchwoman by Christian Fürchtegott Gellert, and the same author's Fables and Tales, as well as The Republic of the Scientists by S. Fayard.

He died in Saint Petersburg in 1820.

== Operas ==
His creative output also included comedies, opera librettos, and even music set to them. His operas Regeneration (Перерождение, 1777), and Saint-Petersburg's Trade Stalls (Санкт Петербургский Гостный Двор) (Note: Sometime translated as The Marketplace in St Petersburg or St Petersburg Bazaar; the full title: "As you live, so you will be judged, or Saint-Petersburg's Trade Stalls (Как поживёшь, так и прослывёшь' или Санкт Петербургский Гостный Двор)) had considerable success.

The second one, a scathing satire to the government officials and their thievish behaviour, is one of the first examples of Russian comic opera. It was staged on December 26, 1779 at the Knipper Theatre in St Petersburg and was repeated 16 times. Later the music was rewritten by a composer Vasily Pashkevich in 1882 and 1792. In a new version the opera was also staged at the Court Theatre.

=== Pashkevich’s Operas to Matinsky’s librettos ===
- Saint-Petersburg's Trade Stalls (Санкт Петербургский Гостиный Двор — Sankt Peterburgskiy Gostinyi Dvor, 1782 St. Petersburg)
- The Pasha of Tunis (Паша Тунисский — Pasha tunisskiy, 1782)
- As you live, so you will be judged (Как поживёшь, так и прослывёшь — Kak pozhivyosh', tak i proslyvyosh, 1792 St. Petersburg) — revision of Saint-Petersburg's Trade Stalls

== See also ==
- Russian opera
- Russian opera articles
- Karl Knipper Theatre
- Vasily Pashkevich
- Gostiny Dvor
