= Mikhail Kerzelli =

Russian composer

Mikhail Franzevich Kerzelli (c. 1740 [or 1750, or 1755] – December 1818) was a pianist, violinist, teacher and composer of string quartets, violin duets, orchestral and liturgical compositions.

Kerzelli was born at Vienna. There are some operas attributed to him:

- Derevensky prazdnik ili Uvenchannaja dobrodetel (Деревенский праздник, или Увенчанная добродетель – The Village Feast or Crowned Virtue, opera in 3 acts, text by Vasily Maikov, 1777 Moscow)
- Finiks (Финикс – Phoenix, text by Nikolai Nikolev), opera in 3 acts (1779 Moscow)
- Arkas i Irisa (Аркас и Ириса – Arkas and Irisa, text by Vasily Maikov), one-act opera, c. 1780, Moscow)
- Plenira i Zelim (Пленира и Зелим – Plenira and Zelim, opera in 3 acts (1789 Moscow) (probably belongs to Ivan Kerzelli)

He died in Moscow.
