= Vadim the Bold =

Legendary chieftain of the Ilmen Slavs

Vadim the Bold (Russian: Вадим Храбрый) was a legendary chieftain of the Ilmen Slavs who led their struggle against Rurik and the Varangians in the 9th century.

According to the Nikon Chronicle, a historic 16th-century Russian chronicle that covered events of 859–1520 CE, the Novgorodians broke into rebellion against Rurik, their ruler, but his Varangian druzhina managed to quell the riots and murdered their leader, Vadim. The first modern Russian historian, Vasily Tatishchev, conjectured that Vadim's mother was the elder daughter of Gostomysl. Hence, Vadim was Rurik's elder cousin and had a better claim to the throne.

== In Russian literature ==
After Tatischev's publications, Vadim became one of the most popular characters in the 18th-century Russian literature. Yakov Knyazhnin, a leading playwright, penned a play in which he contrasted Vadim, a defender of Novgorod's ancient freedom, with the authoritarian Rurik. When the play appeared in 1791, Catherine the Great was enraged, although she had fictionalized Vadim's struggle against Rurik in one of her own plays. Against the background of the French Revolution, Knyazhnin was accused of Jacobinism and all printed copies of his play were to be burnt.

== Authenticity issues ==
In the 19th century, Sergey Solovyov and other major historians cast a doubt on the historicity and authenticity of Vadim. Currently, he is considered a legendary personage. Yet his freedom-loving character appealed to the spirit of Romanticism. Three leading Russian poets of the era, Alexander Pushkin, Vasily Zhukovsky and Mikhail Lermontov, based their poems on the subject of Vadim's legendary exploits.

== Sources ==
- "Вадим Храбрый" . Brockhaus and Efron Encyclopedic Dictionary (in Russian). 1906.
