= Pashkevich =

Pashkevich (Polish: Paszkiewicz; Belarusian: Пашкевіч) is a Polish surname which ultimately comes from the East Slav personal name Pashka or Pashko, a diminutive of Pavel (Paul). The surname may refer to:

- Alaiza Pashkevich (1876–1916), Belarusian poet and political activist
- Andrey Pashkevich (1945-2011), Russian cinematographer and painter
- Igor Pashkevich (1971–2016), Russian figure skater
- Vasily Pashkevich (1742–1797), Russian musician
- Yekaterina Pashkevich (born 1972), Russian ice hockey player

== See also ==
- Paskevich (Russian noble family)
