= Litvinovo =

Litvinovo Литвиново
- Village
- Location within Vladimir Oblast Location within Russia
- Coordinates: 56°19′N 39°24′E
- Country: Russia
- Region: Vladimir Oblast
- District: Kolchuginsky District
- Time zone: UTC+3:00

Litvinovo (Russian: Литвиново) is a rural locality (a village) in Kolchugino, Kolchuginsky District, Vladimir Oblast, Russia. The population was 192 as of 2010. There are 8 streets.

== Geography ==
Litvinovo is located on the Peksha River, 5 km northeast of Kolchugino (the district's administrative centre) by road. Dmitriyevsky Pogost is the nearest rural locality.
