= Melodeclamation =

Melodeclamation (from Greek “melos” = song, and Latin “declamatio” = declamation) was a chiefly 19th century practice of reciting poetry while accompanied by concert music. It is also described as "a type of rhythmic vocal writing that bears a resemblance to Sprechstimme."

It combines the principles of melodrama with a kind of extended technique.

Examples can be found in the music of Robert Schumann, Franz Liszt, Anton Arensky, Mélanie Bonis, Vladimir Rebikov, Isaak Dunayevsky, Dmitri Shostakovich, Franek Kimono, etc.

Particular poems might be associated with particular composers; the works of Frédéric Chopin were often accompanied by the poem cycle of Kornel Ujejski that he called Tłumaczenia Szopena (Translations of Chopin). The cycle was widely circulated in several European languages, and some became particularly associated with specific preludes.
