= Vyacheslav Gaivoronsky =

Russian opera singer and actor (1946–2020)

- Born: 8 February 1946; Khabarovsk, Soviet Union
- Died: 24 September 2020 (aged 74); Moscow, Russia
- Occupations: Opera singer; actor

Vyacheslav Igorevich Gaivoronsky (8 February 1946 – 24 September 2020) was a Russian opera singer and actor.

== Career ==
Gaivoronsky began performing at the Stanislavski and Nemirovich-Danchenko Theatre in 1971, where he performed until 2017. He was also the guest soloist of the Bolshoi Theatre, variously performing throughout Europe, including the Covent Garden and the Comunale in Bologna.

== Personal life ==
Gaivoronsky's parents were performers at the Khabarovsk Musical Comedy Theatre, and studied at the Russian Institute of Theatre Arts under Iosif Tumanov.

He died in 2020, with his son confirming his death, stating that it was likely due to an abdominal issue.
