= Kerzelli family =

Wikimedia disambiguation page

Kerzelli (Russian: Керцелли, Керцель or Керцеллий; also spelled Cherzelli, Kerzelly, Kertsel, Kercel, Kerzel, or Kerzell) is the surname of a large family of musicians of Italian, Czech or Austrian origin, who settled in Russia in the 18th century. They were active in Moscow in the late eighteenth century and known for their contributions to the Russian musical stage.

- Iosif Kerzelli or Iohann (also known as I. B. Kerzelli) was a composer and journalist working for the magazine «Музыкальные увеселения» ("Muzykalye uveseleniya" –"The Musical Amusements", 1774-1775). His trios, choruses, dances etc. were printed there. In 1773 he started a musical college in Moscow, where his sons taught.
- Franz Iosifovich Kerzelli was a cellist, Kapellmeister and composer of a cello concerto, a son of Iosif Kerzelli. He ran a series of concerts with symphony and rogovoi (horn) orchestras until the middle of the 1790s.
- Ivan Kerzelli or Iohann Kerzelly (also known as I. I. Kerzelli, Iosif Iosifovich Kerzelli, or Iosif Kertsel, Russian: Иван Керцелли, Иосиф Иосифович Керцелли, И. И. Керцелли, or Иосиф Керцель) was a conductor in 18th-century Imperial Russia. (see main article)
- Mikhail Franzevich Kerzelli (born c1740 [or 1750, or 1755], Vienna – died end of December 1818, Moscow) was a pianist, violinist, teacher and composer of string quartets, violin duets, orchestral and liturgical compositions. (see main article)
- Ivan Franzevich Kerzelli (born c1760 [or 1765], died May 26 (OS May 14) 1820) was a composer and the Kapellmeister of Petrovsky Theatre in Moscow. He wrote comic operas to the following libretti by Vasily Levshin:
  - Svad'ba gospodina Voldyreva (Свадьба господина Волдырева – The Wedding of Mr Voldyrev), one-act opera 1793 Moscow)
  - Korol na okhote (Король на охоте – The King on the Hunting, three-act opera, 1794 Moscow)
  - Mnimye vdovtsy (Мнимые вдовцы – The False Widowers), three-act opera, 1794 Moscow)
  - Svoya nosha ne tyanet (Своя ноша не тянет – The Burden Is Not Heavy if It Is Yours, two-act opera, probably together with Vasily Pashkevich, 1794 Moscow)
  - Molodye poskoreye starych mogut obmanut' ( Молодые поскорее старых могут обманывать – The Young Can Deceive Better Than Old ), one-act opera (1796 Litvinovo)
- Anton Kerzelli, was a sheet music seller who had a music shop in Moscow
- Lev Kerzelli, was a cellist, and a pupil of Bernhard Romberg (1761-1841).

== Bibliography ==
- Энциклопедический словарь Брокгауза и Ефрона (1890—1907).
- Энциклопедический музыкальный словарь, Сост. Б. Штейнпресс и И. Ямпольский, Москва, 1966
