= Vladimir Rebikov =

Russian composer and pianist

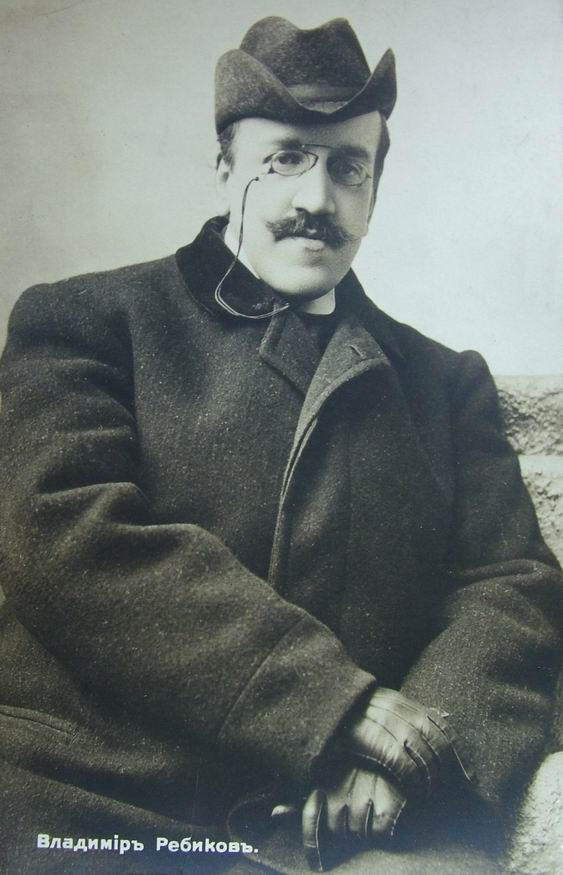
Vladimir Rebikov, Postcard, (1910)

Vladimir Ivanovich Rebikov (Russian: Влади́мир Ива́нович Ре́биков, Vladi'mir Iva'novič Re'bikov); born May 31 [OS May 19] 1866 - Krasnoyarsk, Siberia, Russia — died October 1, 1920 - Yalta, Crimea) was a late romantic 20th-century Russian composer and pianist.

== Biography ==
Born into a family of distant Tatar ancestry, Rebikov began studying the piano with his mother. His sisters also were pianists. He graduated from the Moscow University faculty of philology. He studied at the Moscow Conservatory with Nikolai Klenovsky, a pupil of Tchaikovsky, and then for three years in Berlin and Vienna with K. Mayrberger (music theory), O. Jasch (instrumentation), and T. Müller (piano). Rebikov taught and also held successful concerts in various parts of the Russian Empire: Moscow, Odessa, Kishinev, Yalta, as well as in Berlin, Vienna, Prague, Leipzig, Florence and Paris, where he met Claude Debussy, Oskar Nedbal, Zdeněk Nejedlý, and others. Rebikov settled in Yalta in 1909.

== Works and style ==
Early works suggest the influence of Peter Tchaikovsky and Grieg. He wrote lyrical piano miniatures (suites, cycles, and albums), children's choruses and songs. One of his vocal cycles is called Basni v litsach (The Fables in Faces) after Ivan Krylov. He wrote also a stage work Krylov's Fables (c. 1900). His children's music is the most notable of all his works. He continued the Russian penchant for the whole tone scale, using it in the piece Les demons s'amusent, included into the melomimic suite Les Rêves (Dreams, 1899).

Rebikov’s compositional output can be categorized into three distinct periods, each reflecting his evolving musical style and innovations.

- First Period (1887–1897): This phase marks Rebikov’s formative years, during which he absorbed the prevailing trends of Russian music. His compositions from this time exhibit a late Romantic style, aligning with the dominant musical aesthetics of the era.
- Second Period (1898–1909): Rebikov sought to establish a distinct musical identity, drawing inspiration from the Symbolist movements in art and literature. This period was marked by innovation and experimentation, as he pioneered early Impressionistic techniques, notably incorporating whole-tone scales. He further expanded his harmonic language by exploring quartal and quintal harmonies, seventh and ninth chords, and parallel motion. His pursuit of music as an expressive medium for human emotions led him to develop new genres, for instance, in his piano pieces, Mélomimiques Op. 10 (1898), Meloplastiques, and “musical-psychographical pictures. He was also experimenting with novel forms, such as Rythmodéclamations in which music and mime are combined, and he introduced a type of musical pantomime known as "melo-mimic" and "rhythm-declamation" (see melodeclamation).
- Third Period (1910–1917): This final phase of Rebikov’s career blends simplicity with complexity, primitivism with sophistication, and traditionalism with modernism. His works from this period are notable for being written without meter or measures, incorporating chord clusters and expanding upon his use of quartal and quintal harmonies.

Rebikov used new advanced harmony such as seventh and ninth chords, unresolved cadences, polytonality, and harmony based upon open fourths and fifths. His orchestral and stage works include more than ten operas and two ballets.

== Quotations ==
“Rebikov was already a forgotten figure by the time of his death at age 54. He was bitter and disillusioned, convinced wrongly that composers such as Debussy, Scriabin, and Stravinsky had made their way into public prominence through stealing his ideas. Rebikov is best known by way of his insubstantial music in salon genres. Rebikov's role as an important early instigator of twentieth-century techniques deserves to be more widely recognized.” (Uncle Dave Lewis, Allmusic)

== Operas ==
- V grozu (В грозу — In the Storm, Op. 5, after Vladimir Korolenko 1863, premiered 1894, Odessa)
- Bezdna (Бездна — Abyss after Leonid Andreev, 1907)
- Zhenshchina s kinzhalom (Женщина с кинжалом — The Woman with a Dagger after Arthur Schnitzler, 1910)
- Dvoryanskoye Gnezdo (Дворянское Гнездо — A Nest of Nobles, Op. 55, Op. 55 after Ivan Turgenev, 1916)
- Yolka (Ёлка - The Christmas Tree after Fyodor Dostoevsky, Hans Christian Andersen and Gerhart Hauptmann, 1900, staged 1903).

== Legacy and revival ==
Vladimir Rebikov has seen a resurgence in recognition through modern recordings, digital platforms, and scholarly interest. His works are now featured by Naxos Records and Divine Art Recordings, and are widely accessible on Spotify, bringing his music to new audiences. In academic circles, Dr. Ivan Hurd's 2023 presentation at the MTNA National Conference examined Rebikov’s evolving compositional style. In a scholarly journal on arts, culture, and music, Rebikov was described as an "outstanding representative of Russian musical modernism of the early twentieth century."

== Bibliography ==
Catalogue of Rebikov's Works, Moscow, 1913 Tompakova, O.: Rebikolv, entry in Creative Portraits of Composers, Moscow 1989 (in Russian).
