= Sbiten =

Russian traditional winter drink served hot

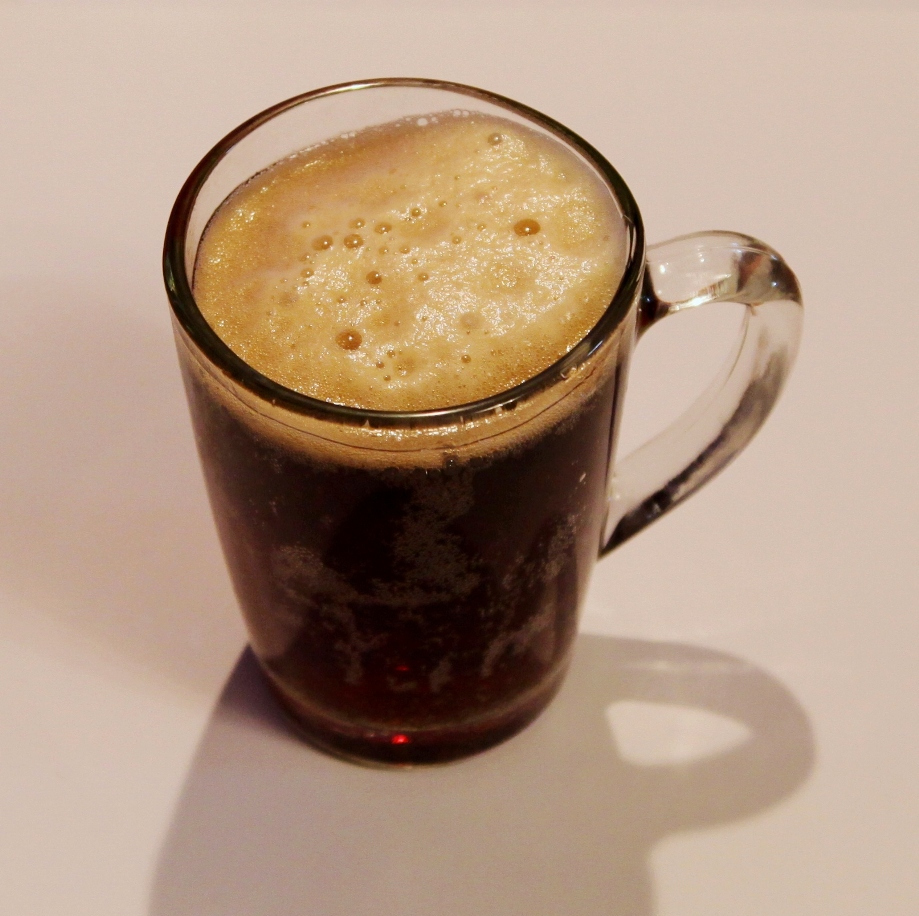
A glass of sbiten

Sbiten (Russian: сбитень, Ukrainian: Збитень) is a traditional hot winter beverage in Eastern Slavic cuisine, including Belarusian, Russian, and Ukrainian cuisines made of honey, spices and herbs boiled in water. Sbiten was a popular drink in Russian cuisine before the appearance of tea in Russia.

It has a dark purple appearance and, depending on the recipe, can be very spicy and/or very sweet. It used to have the reputation of a Russian Glühwein, although it normally contains no alcohol. Modern sbiten can also be served cold during the summer or added to tea or coffee.

== Etymology ==
The word sbiten is derived from the verb sbivat, which means to unite or collect together dissimilar parts. Sbiten was also historically known as vzvar (взвар).

== History ==
First mentioned in chronicles in 1128, sbiten remained popular with all classes of Russian society until the 19th century when it was replaced by coffee and tea. In the 18th century, sbiten still rivalled tea in popularity and was considered a cheaper option. Peter the Great had sbiten given to the work force involved in building his new capital for reasons of cold prevention. In the 18th and 19th centuries, Russian sailors would consume sbiten as a remedy against scurvy (especially when mixed with citrus or ginger juice).

After the breakup of the Soviet Union, it was revived as a sickly sweet and spicy syrup widely distributed through monastery shops. A producer from Pushkinskiye Gory reports sales of about 12 tons of sbiten each month. In September 2018, Vladimir Putin bought a bottle of sbiten at a market in Vladivostok and presented it to his Chinese counterpart Xi Jinping.

== Preparation ==
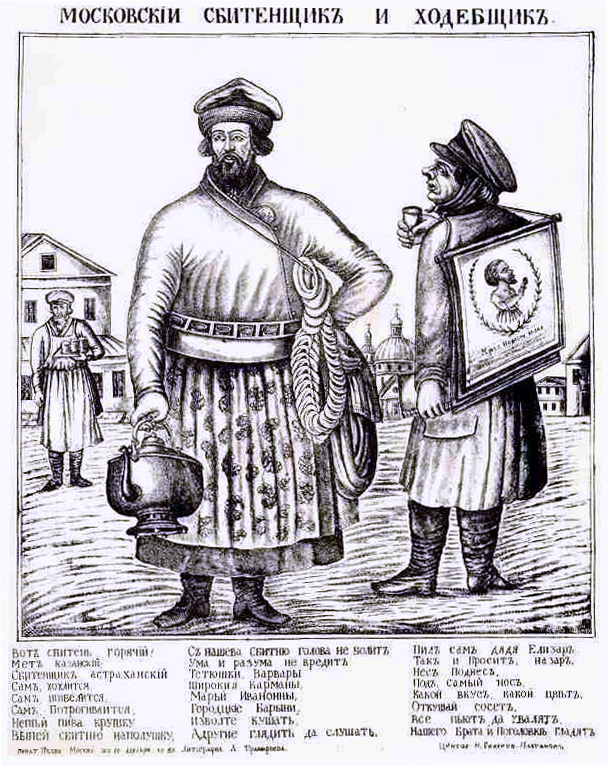
Sbitenshchik and Khodebshchik, a lubok print (19th century)

Like mead and medovukha, sbiten is based on honey mixed with water, spices, and jam. One recipe of sbiten is described in the 16th-century Domostroy. Compared to kvass, sbiten is very simple to prepare. In some recipes, honey and sbiten flavor (spices, juices) are boiled down and then these two parts are combined and boiled again. In other recipes, all the ingredients are combined and boiled at once. The drink can also be made alcoholic by substituting red wine for the water. It can be garnished with mint leaves or cinnamon sticks.

== Sbiten vendors ==
Sbitenshchik (Russian: сбитенщик) was a sbiten vendor in medieval Russia and the Russian Empire who attracted attention to his merchandise by loud advertisement calls and chastushkas. Sbitenshchik was usually a stout strong man, as it required great physical strength to carry a string of glasses and a metal pot full of sbiten.

Sbiten peddlers contributed to the development of the samovar. In the 18th century, they invented its precursor called sbitennik (сбитенник) — a type of kettle that kept sbiten warm at all times.

The comic opera Sbitenshchik (Сбитенщик) by Yakov Knyazhnin with music by Czech composer Antoine Bullant (1783) was popular in Russia at the turn of the 18th and 19th centuries.

== See also ==
- Russian tea culture
