= Yakov Knyazhnin =

Russian writer (died 1791)

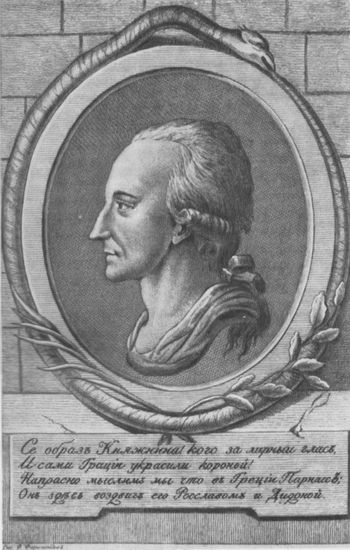
Yakov Knyazhnin

Yakov Borisovich Knyazhnin (Russian: Я́ков Бори́сович Княжни́н;; November 3, 1742 or 1740, Pskov – January 1, 1791, St. Petersburg) was a Russian writer. He was Russia's foremost tragic author during the reign of Catherine the Great. Knyazhnin's contemporaries hailed him as the true successor to his father-in-law Alexander Sumarokov, but posterity, in the words of Vladimir Nabokov, tended to view his tragedies and comedies as "awkwardly imitated from more or less worthless French models".

== Biography ==
Knyazhnin was born into the family of the vice-governor of Pskov. From 1750, he studied in the gymnasium at the Academy of Sciences at St. Petersburg. In 1755, he was a cadet of the Collegium of Foreign Affairs and later a translator. In 1762, he was in military service as a secretary of Kirill Razumovsky.

In 1770, he married Ekaterina Aleksandrovna Sumarokov. The couple had one of the most important literary salons in Russia.

In 1773, he was sentenced to death for spending 6,000 roubles of fiscal money; however, the sentence was reduced: he was deprived of the rank of officer and his nobility. In 1777, he obtained the forgiveness of the Empress Catherine II, and received back his nobility and officer rank. He was employed by Ivan Betskoy as his secretary. Soon he left with his resignation. He taught Russian Literature at the Military School. He was a member of Russian Academy from 1783.

The son of Knyazhnin in a biographic essay about this father wrote that he died of "catarrhal fever". This seems to be more accurate than another version, propagated by Pushkin, which claims that Knyazhnin died from torture at the hands of the secret police.

== Legacy ==
Knyazhnin's contemporary success rested largely on his witty comedies The Braggart (1786) and The Cranks (1790). The latter revolves around the theme of favouritism, of the unexpectedly quick rise in rank, which was topical in Catherine's reign, and considered risqué.

He also wrote six comic operas operas and eight tragedies, which, as D.S. Mirsky put it, "breathe an almost revolutionary spirit of political freethinking". Almost everything he wrote was immediately published by the decree of Catherine the Great. Most of his plays and operas were staged at the Hermitage Theatre in St. Petersburg.

Among his other works are poems and translations including works by Voltaire and Corneille. Writing his plays and opera librettos, Knyaznin often borrowed some ideas from Voltaire, Metastasio, Molière and Carlo Goldoni developing them and putting in different context. He imitated these models so extensively that Alexander Pushkin later referred to him as "Knyazhnin the Borrower" (or "derivative Knyazhnin" — «переимчивый Княжнин», see details).

Knyazhnin's last tragedy, Vadim of Novgorod (1789), was inspired by Catherine II's treatment of Vadim's revolt against Rurik in her own play From Ryurik's Life. Disputing with her, Knyazhnin depicted Vadim as a champion of Novgorod's ancient liberties who has to stab himself in the face of triumphant authoritarianism. When the play was posthumously published in 1793, the Empress had it banned as a "literary revolt". Against the background of the French Revolution, it was decided wise to burn all the copies. Vadim of Novgorod was never staged and was not reprinted in Russia until 1914.

== Dramatic works ==
- Dido (Дидона – Didona), a tragedy 1769. Text. Comments.
- Olga (Ольга), a tragedy 1776–1778. Text. Comments.
- Rosslav (Росслав), a tragedy in 5 acts, publ. 1784 St Petersburg Text. Comments.
- Vadim the Bold or Vadim of Novgorod (Вадим Новгородский – Vadim Novgorogsky), a tragedy 1788 or 1789, publ. 1793. Text. Comments.
- The Braggart (Хвастун – Khvastun), a comedy 1784–1785 publ. 1786. Text. Comments.
- The Cranks (Чудаки – Chudaki), a comedy c1790, publ. 1793. Text. Comments.
- Misfortune from a Carriage (Несчастие от кареты – Neschactye ot karety) opera with music by Vasily Pashkevich, premiere: November 7, 1779, Hermitage Theatre. St Petersburg Text. Comments.
- The Miser (Скупой – Skupoy) opera with music by Vasily Pashkevich, c 1782. Fragments Comments.
- The Sbiten Vendor (Сбитенщик – Sbitenshchik) opera with music by Antoine Bullant also known as Anton Bullandt or Jean Bullant 1783. Fragments Comments.
- Orpheus (Орфей – Orfey) opera-melodrama with music by Giuseppe Torelli, premiere April 30, 1763, later with music by Yevstigney Fomin, premiere: February 5, 1795. Text. Comments.

== Quotations ==
Волшебный край! там в стары годы,
Сатиры смелый властелин,
Блистал Фонвизин, друг свободы,
И переимчивый Княжнин;

— Alexander Pushkin,
Eugene Onegin, (Chapter I, XVIII)
Translation:

Enchanted land! There like a lampion
That king of the satiric scene,
Fonvizin sparkled, freedom's champion,
And the derivative Knyazhnín.

— Translated by Charles H. Johnston

== Bibliography ==
- Knyazhnin, Y. Sbitenscik. Il venditore di sbiten. Testo originale russo a fronte, a c. di Nicoletta Cabassi e Kumusch Imanalieva. Mantova: Universitas Studiorum, 2013, ISBN 978-88-97683-21-6
- Fomin, Yevstigney Ipat'yevich by Richard Taruskin, in 'The New Grove Dictionary of Opera', ed. Stanley Sadie (London, 1992) ISBN 0-333-73432-7

== Sources ==
- "Княжнин, Яков Борисович" . Brockhaus and Efron Encyclopedic Dictionary (in Russian). 1906.
