= Nikolai Nikolev =

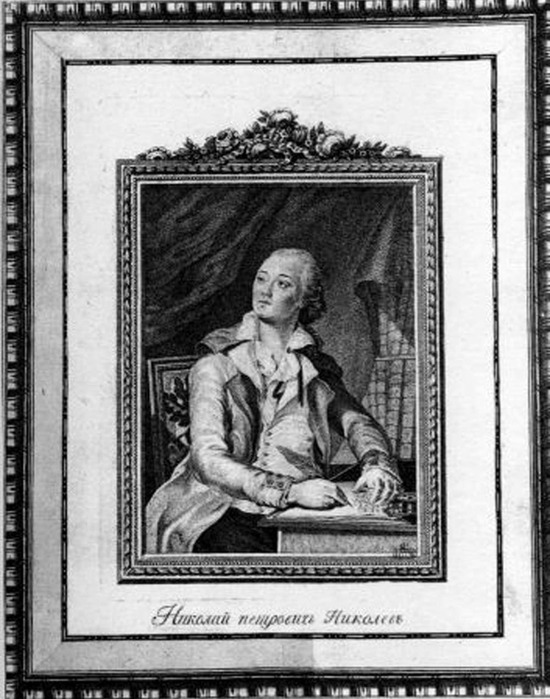
- Nikolai Nikolev

Nikolay Petrovich Nikolev (Russian: Николай Петрович Николев; 21 November 1758 – 5 February 1815), was a Russian poet and playwright.

He was brought up and educated in the family of Princess Ekaterina Dashkova, his distant relation. As President of the Russian Academy, Dashkova secured his admission into the academy and helped popularize his tragedies and folk songs among the Russian elite. The poet went blind at the age of 20, after which his popularity soared and he came to be sentimentally styled a Russian Milton. Emperor Paul also treated Nikolev kindly and referred to him as "L'aveugle clairvoyant". Five volumes of his works were published during Paul's reign. Nikolev had a theatre of serf actors at his estate near Moscow, where he staged his own plays.
