= Vasily Pashkevich =

Russian composer

Vasily Alexeyevich Pashkevich, also Paskevich (Russian: Васи́лий Алексе́евич Пашке́вич or Паске́вич; c. 1742, probably Ukraine – March 20, 1797 in St. Petersburg) was a Russian composer, singer, violinist and teacher of Ukrainian origin who lived during the time of Catherine the Great.

== Biography ==
Vasily Pashkevich was of Ukrainian origin and according to some sources was born in Ukraine.

Vasily Pashkevich entered court service in 1756 becoming a court composer to Tsar Peter III of Russia and later to his widow, Catherine the Great. He also played violin, and taught singing in the Academy of Arts 1773-1774 and later in the court capella. Between 1780 and 1783 he managed the Karl Kniper Theatre and in 1789 he became the first violin of the court orchestra, remaining in charge of imperial ballroom music until his death.

Pashkevich wrote important comic operas, often re-working them at length, like Saint-Petersburg's Trade Stalls, begun in 1782 and revised in 1792, and also As you live you will be judged.

The comic opera The Miser a work of 17 scenes brought him most success. Its roles are: Scriagin, Liubima’s guardian; Liubima, his niece; Milovid, her beloved; Marfa, the servant girl that Scriagin is in love with; Prolaz, Milovid’s manservant who is in Scriagin’s service. Accordingly the speech and the names of the characters of Molière's comedy were turned into Russian as well as the music that combines some features of European form with typically Russian melodies.

Catherine had literary ambitions, and Pashkevich was asked to set one of her own opera libretti for performance at the royal court. The result of this, opera Fevey, was staged on April 19, 1786 at the Hermitage Theatre in St. Petersburg. The lavish opera production evoked widespread admiration. Despite the success of Pashkevich's work during his years serving under Catherine II, his contributions were not appreciated by the Empress's heirs, who terminated his services and denied him a pension.

His style is similar to Italian opera buffa, but unlike them, the comic situations of his works are often overshadowed by vaguely tragic scenes. His operas are full of citations of popular songs, that later become one of the important characteristics of the great 19th-century Russian opera.

== Works ==
=== Operas ===
- Misfortune from Owning a Coach (Несчастье от кареты — Neschastye ot karety, libretto by Yakov Knyazhnin, 1772?, November 7, 1779 St. Petersburg )
- Saint-Petersburg's Bazaar (Санкт Петербургский Гостиный Двор — Sankt Peterburgskiy Gostinyi Dvor, libretto by Mikhail Matinsky 1782 St. Petersburg), revised as You'll be Known by the Way you Live (Как поживёшь, так и прослывёшь — Kak pozhivyosh', tak i proslyvyosh, 1792 St. Petersburg)
- The Burden Is Not Heavy if It Is Yours (Своя ноша не тянет — Svoya nosha ne tyanet, 1794)
- Two Antons (Два Антона - Dva Antona 1804?)
- The Miser (Скупой — Skupoy, 1782?, Moscow, 1811? Yakov Knyazhnin after Molière)
- Fevey (libretto by Catherine II, April 19, 1786 St. Petersburg)
- The Early Reign of Oleg (Начальное управление Олега — Nachal'noye upravleniye Olega, November 2, 1790 St. Petersburg– together with Giuseppe Sarti and the Milanese musician Carlo Cannobio)
- Fedul and his Children (Федул с детьми — Fedul s det'mi, libretto by Empress Catherine II, January 27, 1791 St. Petersburg– together with Vicente Martín y Soler)
- The Pasha of Tunis (Паша Тунисский — Pasha tunisskiy, libretto by Mikhail Matinsky, 1782)

=== Romances ===
- Song (text by Gavrila Derzhavin)
- Masses and other liturgical works.

== Quotations ==
"I never saw anything more diverse and magnificent! There were more than 500 actors performing on stage for just a handful of people. There were a maximum of 50 people watching the whole thing, and that was because the Empress restricts the access to her Hermitage" (A contemporary account on the staging of the opera "Fevey")

== Discography ==
- C10 06853-56. Pashkevich, Vasili. Скупой [The Miser] (1781). Vladimir Agronsky. Chamber Orchestra of Moscow Chamber Musical Theater (recorded 1978)USSR: Melodiya. stereo. Produced by Boris Pokrovsky
- Russkoe barokko - Zolotaya klassika (CD) Label(s): RCD Music RCD 30649 Year of production: 2003, Year of recording: 2003, Baroque Chamber Ensemble. Including:

Vasily Pashkevich. Overture to the opera Fevey Allegro C major 2:51
Vasily Pashkevich. Aria of Tsaritsa from the opera Fevey 2:56 (Libretto by Catherine II)
Vasily Pashkevich. Overture to the opera Fedul s det'mi Allegro C major 2:50

== See also ==
- Opera in Russia in the 18th century
- Russian opera
