= The Coachmen at the Relay Station =

1787 opera by Yevstigney Fomin and Nikolay Lvov

The Coachmen at the Relay Station (Russian: Ямщики на подставе), also referred to as Coachmen on a stand, or an accidental game, is a 1787 one-act comic opera by Yevstigney Fomin with the libretto authored by N. A. Lvov, and was dedicated to friend of Lvov and folk song collector S. M. Mitrofanov, although it was specifically written on occasion of Catherine the Great's visit to Tambov. Although the scheduled visit never occurred, the opera was completed and performed without Catherine's appearance to resolve the plot as Fomin intended.

The work is hallmarked by Fomin's usage of the Russian folk song tradition known as the "drawn out song". It was premiered that same year on January 2 (November 8), 1787, although its location of premiere is dubious, performances having taken place in both Tambov and Saint Petersburg that year. The latter is considered to be the official place of premiere, however. On its premiere, however, the work was not popular with the audience and as a result, it fell out of performance.

Much of Mikhail Glinka's attempts and artistic recreation of Russian folk music practices originated with Fomin, while the nativist project known as, "The Five", specifically Alexander Borodin, continued the focus on authenticity and realism in the ways they attempted to incorporate the choral practices of Russian folk music into their work.

== Roles ==
Roles, voice types, premiere cast
Character	Voice type	Premiere cast
Timofey Burakov	tenor	Mr. Kamushkin
Abram, Timofey's father	bass	Anton Krutitsky
Fadeevna, Timofey's wife	soprano	Ms. Bystreeva
Yanka, young coachman	bass	Yakov Vorobyov
Vakhrush	tenor	Mr. Suslov
Courier	bass	Mr. Volkov
Officer on stand	no singing	Vasily Sharapov
Four coachmen	no singing	
Bobyl, the coachman	no singing	Mr. Rakhmanov
Two messengers	no singing	Mr. Zolin, Mr. Savinov
Two dragons	no singing	
Coachmen's choir

== Musical structure ==
The opera itself has 15 scenes but ten musical numbers.

1. Overture
  - The folk song “Captain’s daughter, don’t go for a walk at midnight” is heard. This corresponds to song No. 16 in Nikolay Lvov and Johann Gottfried Pratsch's 1790 collection of folk songs, Collection of Russian Folk Songs with Their Tunes.
2. Chorus: "Not at the priest's in the green garden..."
3. Chorus: "The falcon flies high"
4. Aria: "The zealous heart is valiant..." (Timofey)
5. Duet: "Between us, coachmen..." (Yanka and Timofey)
6. Trio: "If only I were a bird..." (Vakhrush, Yanka, Courier)
7. Duet with chorus: "Should I buy them, Filyushka..." (Yanka, Timofey, Chorus)
8. Quartet with chorus: "Molodka, regimental soldier..."
9. Trio with chorus: "In the field the birch was raging..." (Fadeevna, Timofey, Yanka)
10. Orchestral march
11. Chorus: "You all give up, give way, good people"

== Recordings ==
- 1966: "Russian music of XVII" (Vladimir Yesipov, Melodiya)
- 2006: "Early Russian opera" (Bomba Music)
- 2020: Nuits Blanches – Opera Arias at the Court of Russia in the 18th Century (Karina Gauvin and Pacific Baroque Orchestra, ATM Classique)

== See also ==
- Russian opera
