= Sankt-Peterburgskie uchyonye vedomosti =

Sankt-Peterburgskiye uchyonye vedomosti
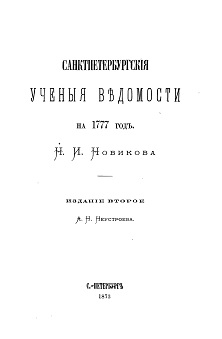
- Cover of the second edition.
- Native name: Russian: Санкт-Петербургские учёные ведомости на 1777 год
- Editor-in-chief: Nikolai Novikov
- Founded: 1777
- Ceased publication: 1777
- Relaunched: 1873
- Language: Russian
- City: St. Petersburg
- Country: Russian Empire

Sankt-Peterburgskie uchyonye vedomosti (Note: Russian: Санкт-Петербургские учёные ведомости) was a weekly journal published in Saint Petersburg in 1777. It was financed by K. V. Miller and edited by Nikolai Novikov. It was the first Russian journal with a critical and bibliographical focus. In 1873, Alexander Neustroev published a second edition of this journal.

== History ==
In 1777, a journal titled "Sankt-Peterburgskiye Uchyonye Vedomosti" began publication in the northern capital of the Russian Empire. Initially appearing twice a week, it later became a daily, but its run proved short-lived: only twenty-two issues saw the light of day. The publication was overseen by the enlightener Nikolai Novikov and printed by the book publisher K. V. Miller.

This publication went down in history as Russia's first critical and bibliographical journal in the Russian language. Its pages featured information about new books, accompanied not merely by a dry list of details but by extensive annotations. The reader could find both a summary of the content and an initial assessment, and sometimes even a detailed critical analysis of the work. The journal's authors did not limit themselves to books from the past years of 1776–1777 but also turned to publications from the entire previous decade.

The main focus of the journal was bibliography, particularly that devoted to history—both Russian and world history. Special attention was given to the first two parts of the "Ancient Russian Vitliophyka": the notes on them meticulously specified the dates of the documents' creation and indicated where the originals were kept. In the seventh issue, within an annotation for the book "Accounts of Byzantine Historians Explaining the Russian History of Ancient Times," a concise yet informative essay on the state of historical scholarship in Russia was included.

Reviews of translated works addressed not only the content of the books themselves but also the skill of the translator. Reviewers thoughtfully evaluated the choice of text for translation, the quality of the style, and the richness of the language—whether the translations were of Marmontel, Justi, Suetonius, or Hume. Questions of style, including the bold introduction of vernacular speech into literary usage, were also raised in the analysis of M. I. Popov's "My Leisure Hours" (No. 8).

Almost a century later, in 1873, it was re-published by A. N. Neustroev.
