= Nikolay Lvov =

Russian artist and architect (1753–1803)

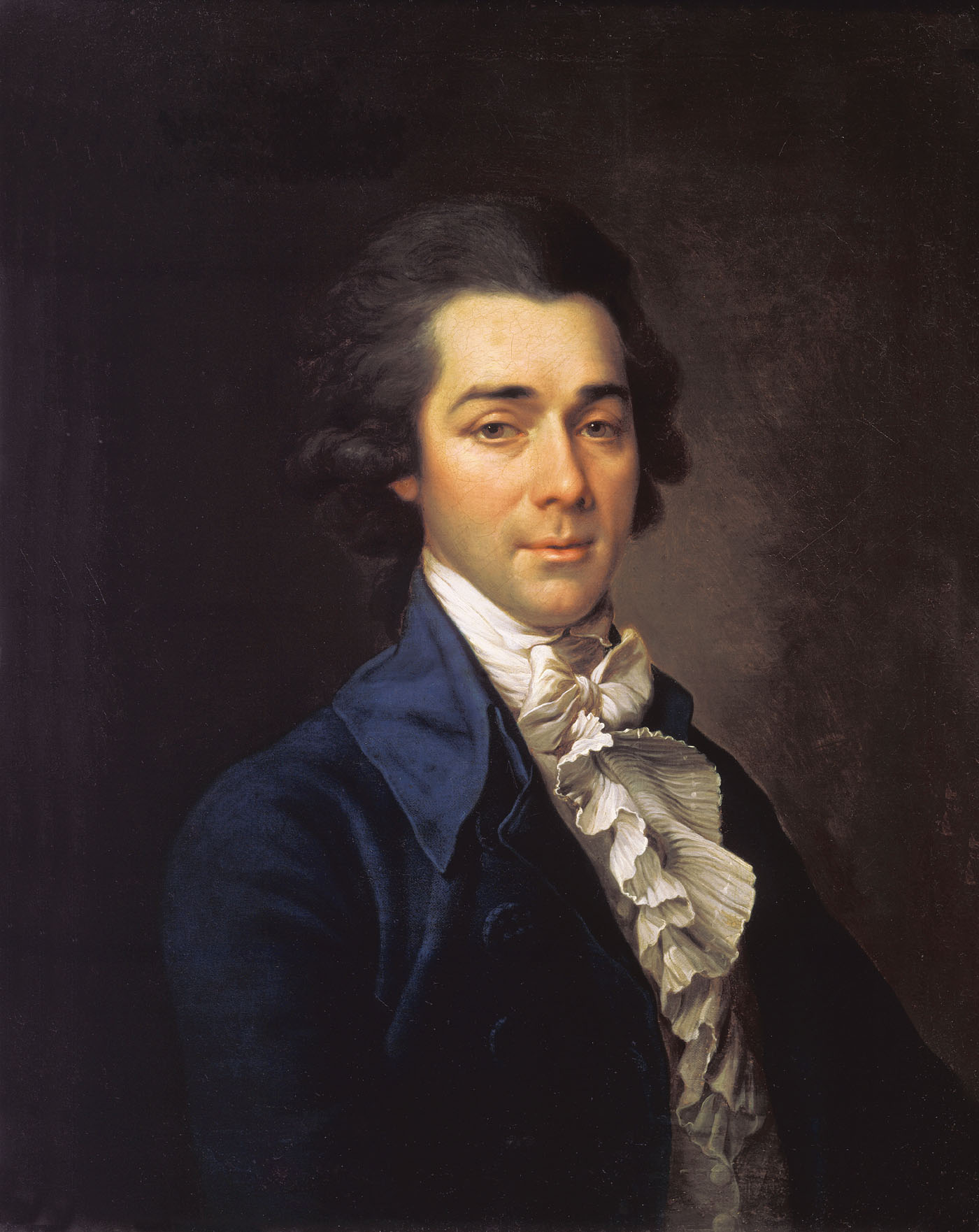
- Portrait by Dmitry Levitzky, 1780s
- Born: May 4, 1753; Cherenchitsy, near Torzhok, Novgorod Governorate, Russian Empire
- Died: December 21, 1803 (aged 50); Moscow, Russian Empire
- Occupation: Architect
- Buildings: Priory Palace, Gatchina; Trinity Church, Saint Petersburg
- Projects: Redesign of Peter and Paul Fortress

Nikolay Aleksandrovich Lvov (Russian: Николай Александрович Львов; May 4, 1753 – December 21, 1803) was a Russian artist of the Age of Enlightenment. Lvov, an amateur of noble lineage, was a polymath who contributed to geology, history, graphic arts and poetry, but is known primarily as an architect and ethnographer, compiler of the first significant collection of Russian folk songs (the Lvov-Prach collection).

Lvov's architecture represented the second, "strict" generation of neoclassicism stylistically close to Giacomo Quarenghi. Lvov worked in Saint Petersburg but his best works survived in the countryside, especially his native Tver Governorate. He redesigned the external appearance of Peter and Paul Fortress and created an unprecedented Trinity Church combining a Roman rotunda with one-of-a-kind pyramidal bell tower. He adapted rammed earth technology to the environment of Northern Russia and used it in his extant Priory Palace in Gatchina; Lvov's construction school, established in 1797, trained over 800 craftsmen. He managed geological surveys and published a treatise on the coals from Donets Basin and Moscow Basin. He experimented with coal pyrolysis, proposed new uses for coal tar and sulphur, and wrote a reference book on heating and ventilation.

Lvov designed the badges of the Order of St. Vladimir and the Order of St. Anna, translated works by Anacreon, Palladio, Petrarch, Sappho and the Saga of King Harald into Russian language, wrote libretto for opera and vaudeville, researched Russian chronicles and published one of the first versions of the bylina of Dobrynya Nikitich. In 1783, he became one of the first 36 members of the Russian Academy.

In 1931, Vladislav Khodasevich called Lvov "an intelligent and subtle connoisseur of everything ... who was not destined to do anything remarkable." Later researchers appreciated Lvov's contribution: Richard Taruskin considered Lvov's collection of folk songs "the greatest and most culturally significant of Russian folk collections", Philip Bohlman credited discovery of Russian folk art "all from the actions of a single individual, Lvov", William Craft Brumfield called Lvov "one of the greatest neoclassical architects produced in the reign of Catherine the Great... neoclassical aesthetics at its purest".

== Early years ==
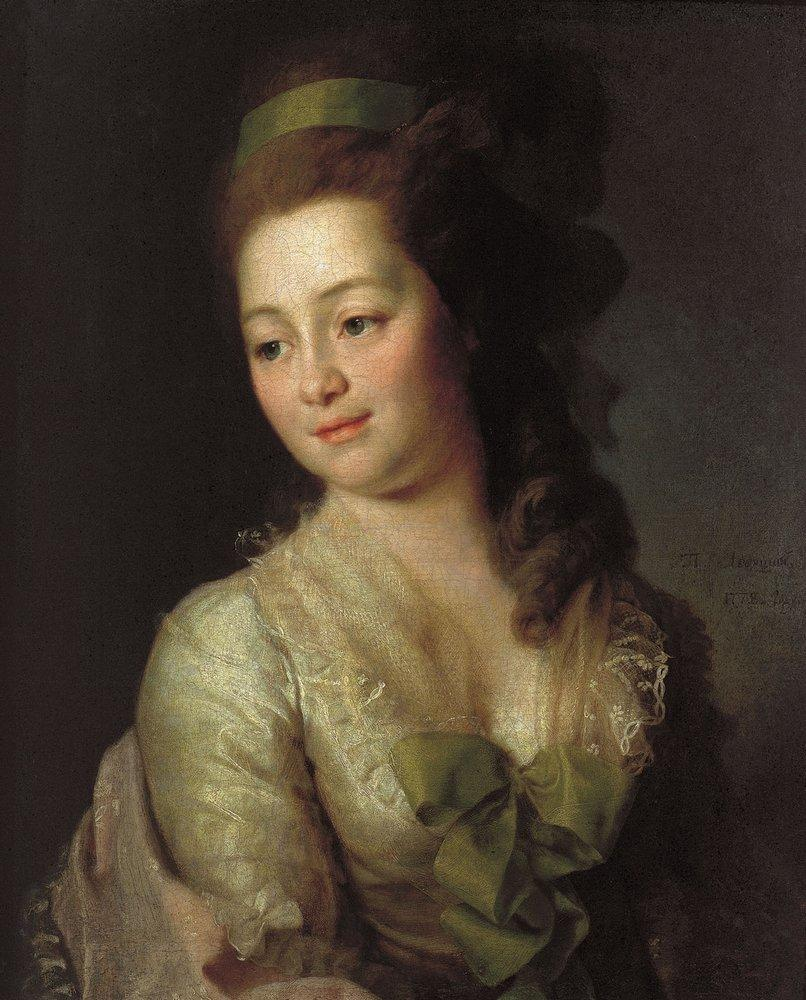
Maria Lvova, née Dyakova (Dmitry Levitzky, 1778)

Nikolay Lvov was born in an impoverished country estate 16 kilometres (9.9 mi) from Torzhok. Sources published before 2001 state date of birth March 4, 1751; in 2001, Galina Dmitrieva published newly found church records showing that Lvov was actually born May 4, 1753.

In line with tradition, his parents "enrolled" Nikolay into Preobrazhensky Lifeguard regiment in 1759. Ten years later, Nikolay arrived in Saint Petersburg and joined the regiment. In 1770–1771, he attended training courses at Izmaylovsky Regiment; these courses were the only instance of formal education in his life. Until 1775, Lvov, along with his military service that became a mere formality, was also employed by the Collegium of Foreign Affairs as a diplomatic courier and extensively travelled to German principalities and Denmark. In July 1775, Lvov resigned both military and civil service in the rank of captain and returned to his parents' estate, but one year later returned to diplomatic service. This time, he travelled to London, Madrid, Paris and the Netherlands; in Paris, Lvov indulged in frequent theatre going and made good acquaintance with poet Ivan Khemnitser and the Bakunin family.

Back in Saint Petersburg, Lvov created a private theatre based in the Bakunin house and played lead parts in plays by Jean-François Regnard, Antonio Sacchini and, probably, Yakov Knyazhnin. He led otherwise a modest lifestyle of a salaried clerk, living at his friends' houses, and could not afford renting his own until May 1779, when his pay was raised to 700 roubles per annum.

Around 1778 or 1779, Lvov developed relationship with Maria Dyakova (her sister Alexandra was engaged to Vasily Kapnist). Maria's father, an influential statesman, distrusted Lvov at first sight and ruled out any marriage proposals. She and Lvov were secretly married in a church in Saint Petersburg on November 8, 1780. Maria still lived in her parents' house for three more years. By 1783, Lvov's social standing improved to the point where the father reluctantly approved the marriage; only then the secret ceremony of 1780 became public. The affair between Lvov and Maria Dyakova became a subject of romance novel fiction (the most recent paperback was issued in 2008).

In April 1781, Lvov was appointed secretary to the Russian Embassy in Dresden, Kingdom of Saxony, but "her majesty's will" retained him at Saint Petersburg court. Instead of Dresden, he left for Warsaw and Vienna on government business and managed to carve out time for a personal tour of Italy (Livorno, Pisa, Florence, Bologna and Venice). During his tour in Italy, he met with several influential people associated with the Russian court, including Count Demetrio Mocenigo in Pisa. In May 1783, Lvov transferred from Foreign Affairs to the Directorate of Post Offices, where he served under Alexander Bezborodko until 1797. Most of his achievements in arts and sciences took place alongside government service and clearly took precedence over it, so Lvov's career was not as rapid as that of Gavrila Derzhavin.

== Poetry and politics ==
Contrary to neoclassical mainstream of his age, Lvov as a poet belonged to emerging sentimentalism and pioneered exploration of "spontaneous, great-hearted sincerity in the Russian peasant" that defined yet unexplored national character. He belonged to a close-knit ring of fellow poets; its key members, Lvov, Derzhavin and Vasily Kapnist, were bonded by their marriages to three Dyakova sisters. Kapnist married Alexandra Dyakova in 1781; Derzhavin married Yekaterina Dyakova in 1795, his second marriage. Lvov, Kapnist and Ivan Khemnitser shaped the poetic self-determination of their elder and better-known friend Derzhavin whose literary career started in 1779. The group also included painters (Dmitry Levitzky, Vladimir Borovikovsky), musicians (Yevstigney Fomin and probably Dmitry Bortniansky), engravers and publishers; Marina Ritsarev called the Lvov ring "another Russian Academy, albeit an informal one".

Lvov, "a matchless connoisseur for his age" provided "artists of the high culture with worthy models for emulation." Lvov's own verses contain one of the first literary imitations of a folk song, set to the metre of traditional wedding chants later known as Koltsov's metre, a precursor of one of the commonest poetic genres in 19th-century Russian poetry and a testimony to an emerging new status of folk art and the very concept of a nation. He composed one of the first literary stories about Dobrynya Nikitich; unlike his contemporary James Macpherson, he never attempted to disguise it as a true folk bylina.

Politically, Lvov was an "active royalist" faithful to Catherine and later Paul I, at the same time he was also loyal to his fraternity; he secured a diplomatic appointment to Khemnitzer, and tried to prevent the 1790 trial of Alexander Radishchev. Lvov as a mature man parted with his affection to Western culture and became "sort of a slavophile avant la lettre." He was the first to discover poetic qualities of Russian winter, previously overlooked or denied, and to turn it into a stylistic device. For him, winter became a manly nationalistic symbol of what makes Russians different from their Western and Southern neighbors. In the end, Lvov produced "perhaps the most articulate early image of the exuberant Russian soul, and the most explicitly contemptuous of the West" predating nationalist writing by Nikolai Gogol.

== Ethnography ==
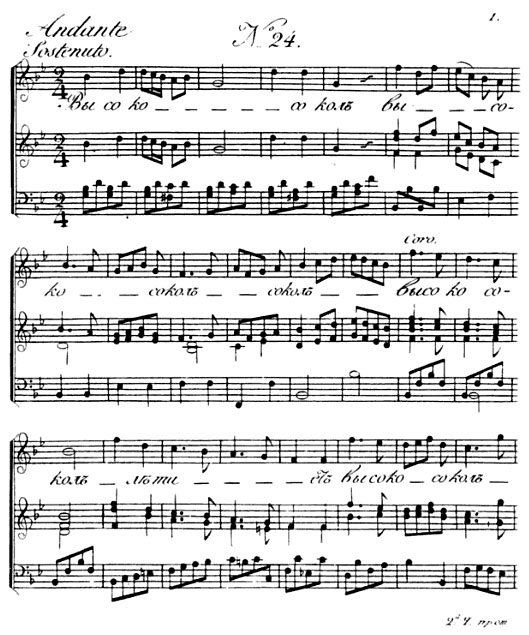
Sheet music from the 1806 edition of Lvov and Pratsch collection

Lvov collaborated with composer Yevstigney Fomin, "by far and away the ablest native-born Russian composer of his period" on a folk singspiel The Coachmen (Russian: Ямщики на подставе, 1787), "the highest at which Russian opera before Glinka ever aimed" and "astonishingly faithful to those of genuine oral polyphony." The Coachmen was written in 1786 as a one-time event to mark Catherine's visit to Tambov (a new town managed by Lvov's buddy Derzhavin) and contained the first instance of A Birch Stood in the Field (Russian: Во поле берёзка стояла) recorded and performed professionally. The song was later used by Mily Balakirev in the Overture on Russian Themes and Pyotr Ilyich Tchaikovsky in the finale of his Fourth Symphony.

Lvov's ethnographic activities were marked by a distinct form of nationalism of his age, "idealization and flattery of the folk"; Lvov himself wrote that one of his objectives was to impress "present-day philosophers" in patriotic virtues of the Russians. He created the Russian name for a folk song (народная песня), adopting Herder's concept of Volkslieder. Lvov's preface to his collection of folk poems published in 1790 contains the first professional description of Russian polyphonic folk singing, a knowledge later forgotten and resurrected in the 1870s.

The book, containing one hundred songs, Collection of Russian Folk Songs with Their Tunes (Собрание народных русских песен с их голосами) was published at the expense of Her Majesty's Cabinet and was reissued in 1806 adding 53 new songs; vulgar or "antisocial" songs were excluded. The book was co-authored by Ivan Prach (or Jan Prač) who transcribed sheet music, and is thus known in the English world as Lvov-Prach collection, shortly LPC.

One of the songs from the LPC, Glory to the Sun, has been used by Ludwig van Beethoven in the Second Razumovsky Quartet, by Modest Mussorgsky in Boris Godunov and by other composers. Verses of yet another song were previously published by Alexander Sumarokov; its LPC version remained a staple of household music throughout the 19th century and was adopted by Mikhail Glinka, Alexander Borodin and Fernando Sor although later critics branded it "fake folk". Margarita Mazo, on the contrary, wrote that LPC material is closer to modern understanding of folk music than scientific, surgical transcriptions of the end of the 19th century, and that the creativity of Lvov and Pratsch "influenced the folk tradition itself" through numerous songbooks that circulated all over Russia.

== Architecture ==
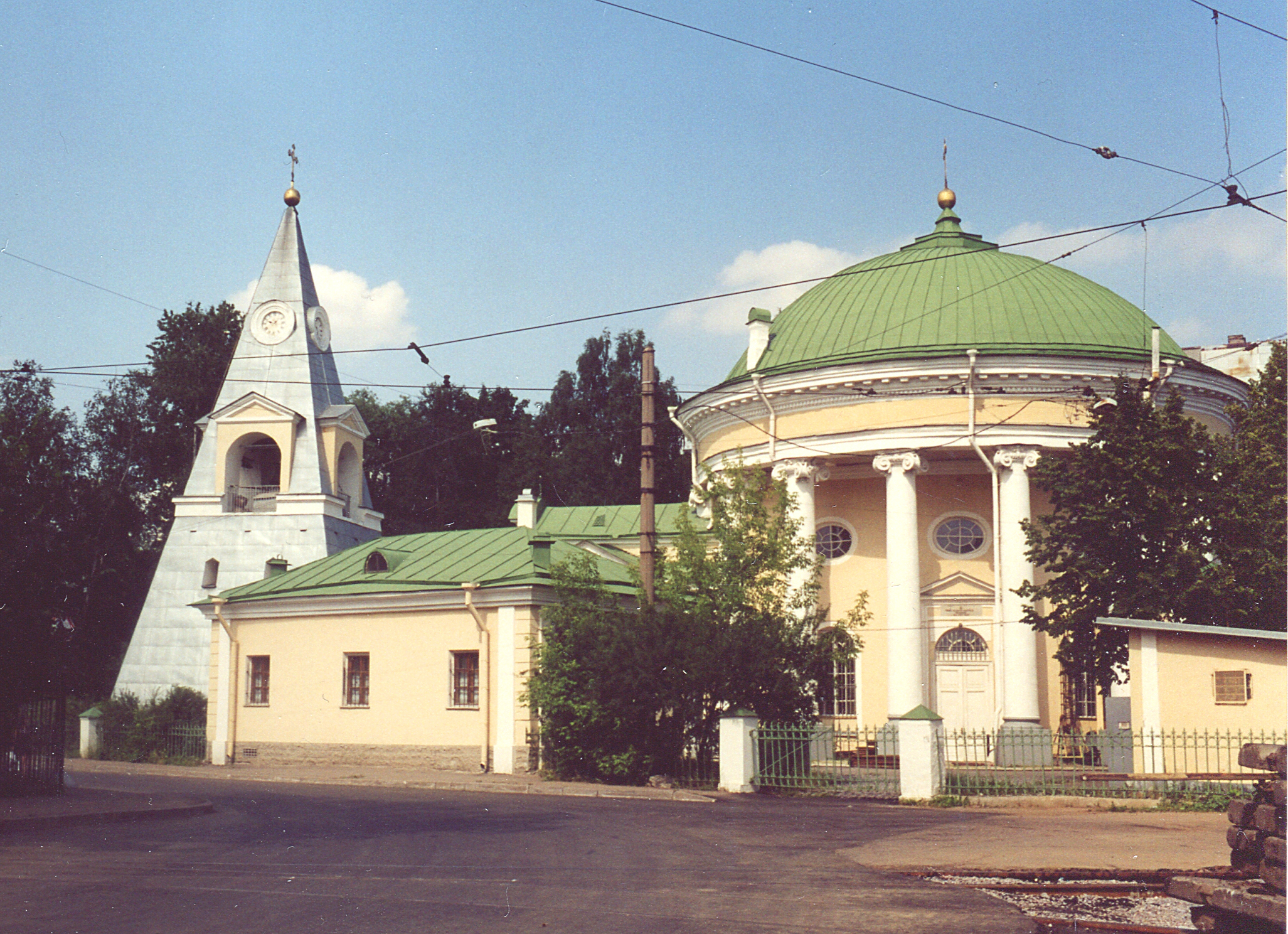
Trinity Church, Saint Petersburg

A list of Lvov's architectural works compiled by Tatarinov contains 87 buildings and country estates, some unconditionally attested through archive evidence, others attributed with different degrees of confidence. The first work on this list, interiors of the house for Sophie Dorothea of Württemberg, the bride of Paul I, was commissioned by Catherine in the summer of 1776. However, absolute majority of Lvov's works were built for private clients: Bezborodko, Derzhavin, Olenin (Utkina Dacha), Kochubey, the Vorontsov and Vyazemsky families in the 1780s.

In 1780, shortly after the meeting of Catherine and Joseph II in Mogilev, Bezborodko introduced Lvov to the empress. Catherine commissioned Lvov the church of Saint Joseph in Mogilev to commemorate the event, the project earned him honorary membership at the Imperial Academy of Arts (1786). The neoclassical rotunda church was built under his supervision until 1798. It became a cathedral in 1802, was converted to a museum in 1934 and demolished in 1937. Also in 1780, Lvov proposed redesign of the Neva Gate of Peter and Paul Fortress in Saint Petersburg; the project materialized in 1784–1787 and included complete refit of decrepit fortress walls with granite cladding and construction of granite pier in place of an old wooden one. The Tuscan portal of the Neva Gate is ranked among his best, if not the best, architectural works.

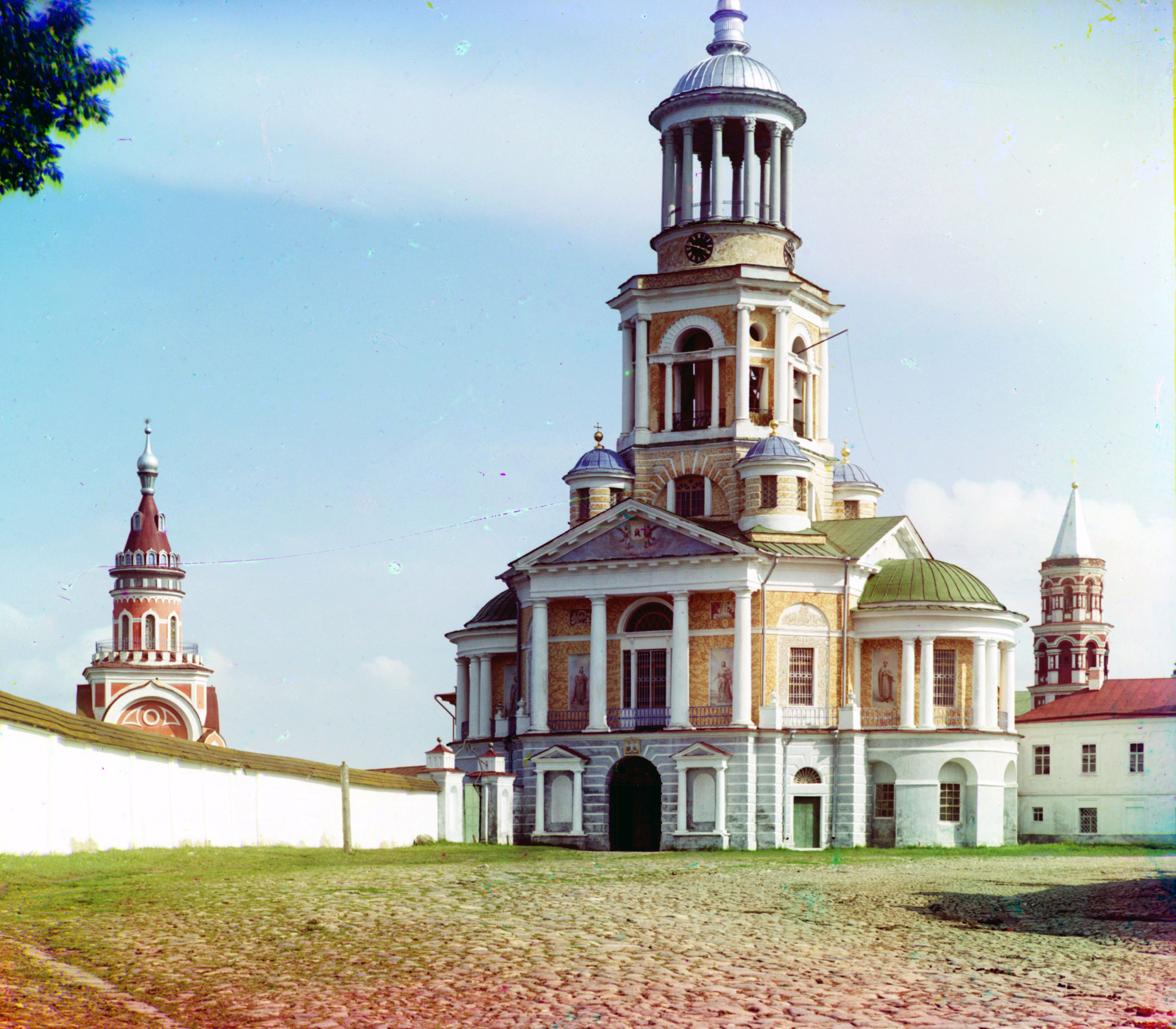
Bell tower of Borisoglebsky Monastery. Photograph by Sergey Prokudin-Gorsky, 1910

In 1783, Lvov designed the new building for his new employer, the Directorate of Post Offices; the block-sized compound, completed in 1789, became his largest project in Saint Petersburg as well as his home: after completion Lvov and his family moved into an apartment on the northern side of the block. The building, rebuilt by Yegor Sokolov in the 19th century and Alberto Cavos in the 1850s, stands to date. Bezborodko, chief of the Directorate, remained Lvov's patron and provided him private and public commissions (including the extant Bezborodko Dacha in Saint Petersburg) until his death in 1799.

Another high-ranking client, prince Vyazemsky, director of state porcelain factories, commissioned a suburban estate (now within the limits of Saint Petersburg) including Lvov's most unusual work, the Trinity Church in Aleksandrovskoe also known as Kulich and Paskha (1785–1787). The main rotunda was probably influenced by the Temple of Vesta; the pyramidal bell tower has no analogues, even remote, in Russian architecture and was a forerunner to the revival of Ancient Egyptian architecture associated with Empire style of the Alexander I period.

In the same period, Lvov designed the cathedral of Borisoglebsky Monastery in Torzhok, a purely Neoclassical five-domed edifice that also contained hints of Russo-Byzantine architecture, a style that emerged decades after Lvov's death. The bell tower of the same monastery became Lvov's last known design; it was started after his death by Fyodor Ananyin and completed in 1811.

In 1798, Lvov published the first volume of Russky Pallady, an adapted translation of Andrea Palladio's I Quattro Libri dell'Architettura with Lvov's own lengthy comments. It was the second attempt to publish Palladio in Russian, after Prince Dolgorukov's 1699 abstract that circulated only in handwritten copies; the first complete and unabridged Palladio was not published until 1938. The work took eight years: Lvov personally engraved in copper over 200 copies of original engravings from the 1616 Venetian edition, the earliest he could acquire. Lvov wished "Palladio's taste to prosper in my country; French twists and English refinement already have plenty of imitators" and particularly criticized French adaptations of Palladianism.

Paul I, who ascended to the throne in November 1796, dismissed most of his mother's statesmen but retained Bezborodko in charge of foreign affairs. Paul extended the favor to Lvov and granted him state support and new commissions, although nowhere as significant or lucrative as those awarded to Vincenzo Brenna (Khodasevich: "Even under new order Lvov was swimming along like a fish in water"). In an ironic twist of fortune, in April 1797, Paul I dispatched Lvov to Moscow to redesign Bartolomeo Rastrelli's modest Grand Kremlin Palace, a feat once attempted by Vasili Bazhenov. Lvov produced a vast plan consisting of a three-part neoclassical palace core within a redesigned Gothic Revival citadel, "an intimate royal villa in a park-like setting." His design was not as radical as Bazhenov's 1767 draft that was cancelled by Catherine at an early stage, but shared the same fate. After one year of preliminary work, the project was canceled; all alterations to existing Kremlin buildings done by Lvov were later absorbed into extant Grand Kremlin Palace, designed by Konstantin Thon.

== Technology ==
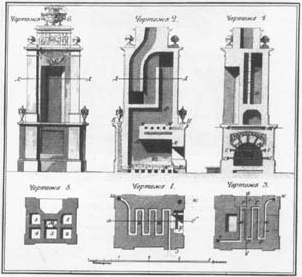
Lvov's furnace design from Russkaya Pyrostatika, 1793

In 1785, Lvov acquired a helpful associate Adam Menelaws, one of 73 Scottish craftsmen recruited by Charles Cameron, and the future house architect of Nicholas I. Interaction and influence between Lvov and Menelaws are disputed. Andreyev, on one extreme, considered Menelaws completely dependent on Lvov's talent; Kuznetsov, on the other, considered Menelaws to be Lvov's mentor in design and construction management and suggested that Lvov's rammed earth technology was actually developed by Menelaws while Lvov provided a respectable front and palace connections.

The first task assigned to Menelaws was something different: searching for coal deposits in Lvov's native Tver Governorate. Lvov was concerned about Russia's dependence on imported British coals and deforestation caused by charcoal extraction, and gained support of Bezborodko and Vorontsov to survey for fossil coals. In August 1786, Lvov and Menelaws announced the find of commercial quality coal "not inferior to that from Newcastle" in Borovichi. Menelaws concurrently managed Lvov's construction projects in Torzhok and other places, raising suspicion that coal survey was merely an excuse for appropriating the Scotsman. Prospecting for coal continued for years, commercial coal mining in Borovichi commenced only 11 years later, after Paul I granted Lvov state support in his business.

Lvov arranged shipment of coal by barges to Saint Petersburg, but his coal did not sell well. Unaware of spontaneous combustion hazard, the shippers dumped incoming coal in one lump on the bank of the Neva River; the whole enterprise ended in a spectacular fire. Lvov's interest in fossil coal did not fade completely until at least 1800 when he sent Menelaws to recruit workers and purchase machinery in England.

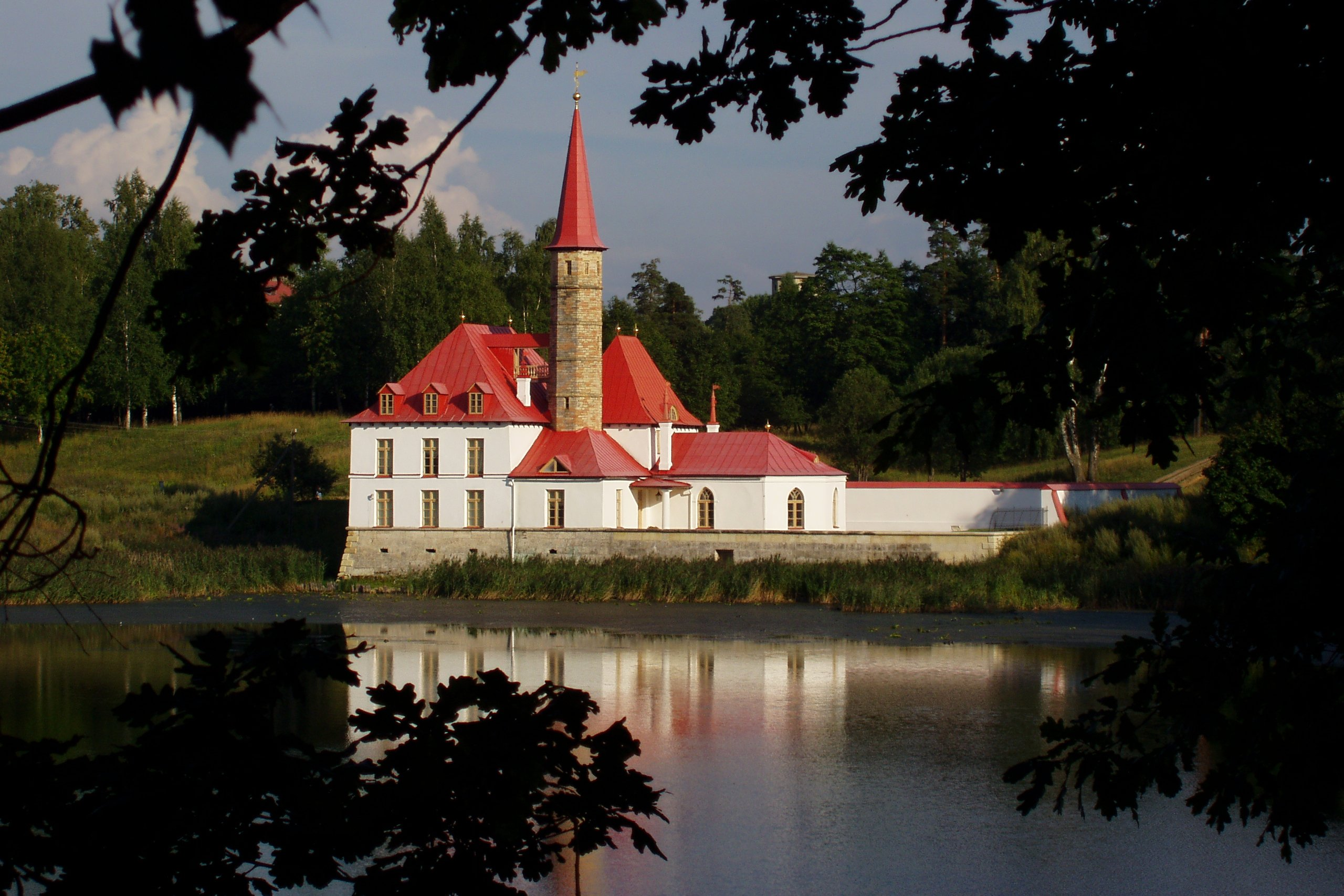
Priory Palace, Gatchina

Lvov, concerned with the inefficiency of existing heating ovens, designed his own heating system and advertised it through a two-volume treatise on heating and ventilation (Русская Пиростатика / Russkaya Pyrostatica, 1793). Walls of Lvov's buildings contained elaborate heat exchanging ductwork that gently warmed up incoming outdoor air, heating and ventilating indoor space simultaneously. These ducts became his trademark and were used to identify Lvov's designs, notably the Trinity church.

In the 1790s, Lvov privately experimented with adopting European rammed earth technology to the environment of Northern Russia. Whether he imported the technology himself or relied on Menelaws, the novelty seemed promising. In August 1797, he obtained Paul's consent and state financing to set up a school training local workers in new technology, irrigation and road construction. The main school was located in Lvov's own estate, and a branch in Moscow; in six years, it trained 815 men.

In the end of 1797, Paul commissioned Lvov to design and build the Priory Palace in Gatchina Park—the largest rammed earth project ever built in Russia. It also used another of Lvov's inventions, a composite roofing material made by impregnating cardboard sheets with coal tar and mineral powders. Paul's manager, Count Prozorovsky, forced Lvov to build the palace literally in a swamp, and the Priory, built literally of dirt and dust, was rated to stand for 25 years only. Contrary to expectations, it survived over 200 years including neglect of the Soviet period and German attempts to destroy it during World War II.

== The last years ==
The death of Lvov's benefactor Alexander Bezborodko in April 1799 slowed down Lvov's projects; Lvov himself fell ill in September 1800 and barely recovered by April 1801. In July 1801, Lvov wrote that he "returned from the other world on crutches" but managed to get through to the new emperor, Alexander I, and presented his album on rammed earth construction. The meeting paid back in October 1802, when Alexander granted Lvov the rank of privy councilor and appointed him to the Expedition of State Household. Lvov's health deteriorated again and he left Saint Petersburg for the Caucasus. On his way south, he designed and built the foundations for the Stone of Tmutarakan in Taman and wrote a description of mineral springs of Mount Beshtau district. Spa treatment did not help, and he died on the way back, in Moscow. He was buried in a rotunda mausoleum in his native Cherenchitsy that he designed in 1784 and built in the 1790s.

Maria died in 1807; their three daughters (Elizaveta, Vera and Praskovya, 14 to 18 years of age in 1807) were raised by Gavrila and Darya Derzhavin. In 1809–1811 Elizaveta Lvova acted as Derzhavin's secretary and recorded his spoken memoirs. Lvov's two sons joined imperial service earlier and were not known for anything notable; the fame of Princes of Lvov passed to a different branch of the family.

Lvov's cousin Fyodor Petrovich Lvov (1766–1836), a composer, headed the Imperial Capella in Saint Petersburg. Fyodor's son Aleksey Fyodorovich Lvov (1799–1870) followed in his father's footsteps and inherited his chair at the Imperial Chapel, but is better known as the author of the imperial Russian national anthem God Save The Tsar! (Bozhe, tsarya khrani). Hector Berlioz called Aleksey Lvov "an eminent musician, who is both virtuoso and composer. His talent as a violinist is remarkable, and his latest work, Ondine, contains beauties of the highest order..." Aleksey Lvov also ventured into ethnography, focusing on the historical liturgical singing, and even attempted to enforce, in vain, his vision of historical truth in church music.

== Sources ==
- Baer, Stephen (1991). The paradise myth in eighteenth-century Russia: utopian patterns in early secular Russian literature and culture. Stanford University Press. ISBN 0804715335.
- Boele, Otto (1996). The North in Russian romantic literature. Rodopi. ISBN 9051839944.
- Bohlman, Philip Vilas (2004). The music of European nationalism: cultural identity and modern history. ABC-CLIO. ISBN 1576072703.
- Brumfield, William Craft (1997). Landmarks of Russian Architecture: A Photographic Survey. Routledge. ISBN 9056995375.
- Cracraft, James; Rowland, Daniel Bruce (2003). Architectures of Russian Identity: 1500 to the Present. Cornell University Press. ISBN 0801488281.
- Cross, Anthony Glenn (1997). By the banks of the Neva: chapters from the lives and careers of the British in eighteenth-century Russia. Cambridge University Press. ISBN 0521552931.
- Emerson, Caryl; Oldani, Robert (2006). Modest Musorgsky and Boris Godunov: Myths, Realities, Reconsiderations. Cambridge University Press. ISBN 0521369762.
- Franklin, Simon; Widdis, Emma (2004). National identity in Russian culture: an introduction. Cambridge University Press. ISBN 0521839262.
- Glinka, N. I., Lappo-Danilevsky, K. Yu (2006). "Nikolay Alexandrovich Lvov" (in Russian). Pushkin House.
- Greenfield, Liah (1992). Nationalism: five roads to modernity. Harvard University Press. ISBN 0674603192.
- Grigoryeva, T. (2002). "Zemlebit. Zabytaya technologia (Землебит. Забытая технология)" (in Russian). Istoria Gatchiny magazine.
- Hayden, Peter (2006). Russian Parks and Gardens. Frances Lincoln. ISBN 0711224307.
- Khodasevich, Vladislav (2007). Derzhavin: a biography. University of Wisconsin Press. ISBN 978-0299224202.
- Kuznetsov, S. O. (1998). "Adam Menelas na rossiyskoy zemle (Адам Менелас на российской земле. Возможные пути интерпретации творчества архитектора императора Николая I)" (PDF) (in Russian). The Philosophical Age. Almanac 6. Russia at the Time of Nicholas I: Science, Politics, Enlightenment. Ed. by T. Khartanovich, M. Mikeshin. St. Petersburg, 1998. Archived from the original (PDF) on December 18, 2022.
- Lvov, Nikolay (1994). Izbrannye Sochineniya (Избранные сочинения / Selected works) (in Russian). Böhlau Verlag Köln / Pushkin House / Instituto Russica / Acropolis. ISBN 3-412-06894-2.; German language edition (1995) ISBN 978-3-412-06894-3. Also contains:
  - Derzhavin, G. R. (1804)(in Russian) Pamyati druga (Памяти друга).
  - Lappo-Danilevsky, K. Yu. (1994)(in Russian) Comments to selected works by Nikolay Lvov.
  - Lvov, F. P. (1833)(in Russian) Nikolay Alexandrovich Lvov.
  - Muravyov, M. N. (in Russian) Kratkoe svedenie o zhizni taynogo sovetnika Lvova (Краткое сведение о жизни тайного советника Львова)
  - Tatarinov, A. V. (1994)(in Russian) Arkhitekturnye raboty N. A. Lvova (Архитектурные работы Н. А. Львова).
- Lvov, Nikolay (1998). Italyansky dnevnik / Italienisches Tagebuch (Итальянский дневник / Italienisches Tagebuch) (in Russian and German). Böhlau Verlag Köln / Pushkin House. Also contains:
  - Lappo-Danilevsky, K. Yu. (1998)(in Russian and German) Preface and Comments to the Italian Diary by Nikolay Lvov.
- Miliugina, Elena (2009). "N. A. Lvov - izdatel Russkogo Palladia (Н. А. Львов - издатель Русского Палладия)". Izvestia Uralskogo Universiteta (in Russian) (1/2 (63)).
- Morgan, Christopher; Orlova, Irina (2005). Saving the Tsars' Palaces. Polperro Heritage Press. ISBN 095491371X.
- Moser, Charles (1992). The Cambridge history of Russian literature. Cambridge University Press. ISBN 0521425670.
- Ritsarev, Marina (2006). Eighteenth-century Russian music. Ashgate Publishing, Ltd. ISBN 0754634663.
- Schmidt, Albert J. (1989). The architecture and planning of classical Moscow: a cultural history. DIANE Publishing. ISBN 0871691817.
- Shuisky, V. K. (2008). Zolotoy vek barocco i classicizma v Sankt-Peterburge (Золотой век барокко и классицизма в Санкт-Петербургу) (in Russian). Centrpoligraph. ISBN 978-5-9524-3777-7.
- Shvidkovsky, Dmitry (2007). Russian architecture and the West. Yale University Press. ISBN 978-0300109122.
- Taruskin, Richard (2001). Defining Russia Musically: Historical and Hermeneutical Essays. Princeton University Press. ISBN 0691070652.
