= Chemnitzer =

Chemnitzer may refer to:

- Chemnitzer concertina, a large, square concertina used for traditional German and polka music
- Chemnitzer Land, a former district in the Free State of Saxony, Germany
- Chemnitzer FC, a German football club based in Chemnitz, Saxony
- Chemnitzer BC, a German football club based in Chemnitz, Saxony
- Ivan Chemnitzer (1745–1784), Russian poet
- Johannes Chemnitzer (1929–2021), East German politician
