= The miller who was a wizard, a cheat and a matchmaker =

1779 Russian ballad opera

- Ballad opera by Mikhail Sokolovsky
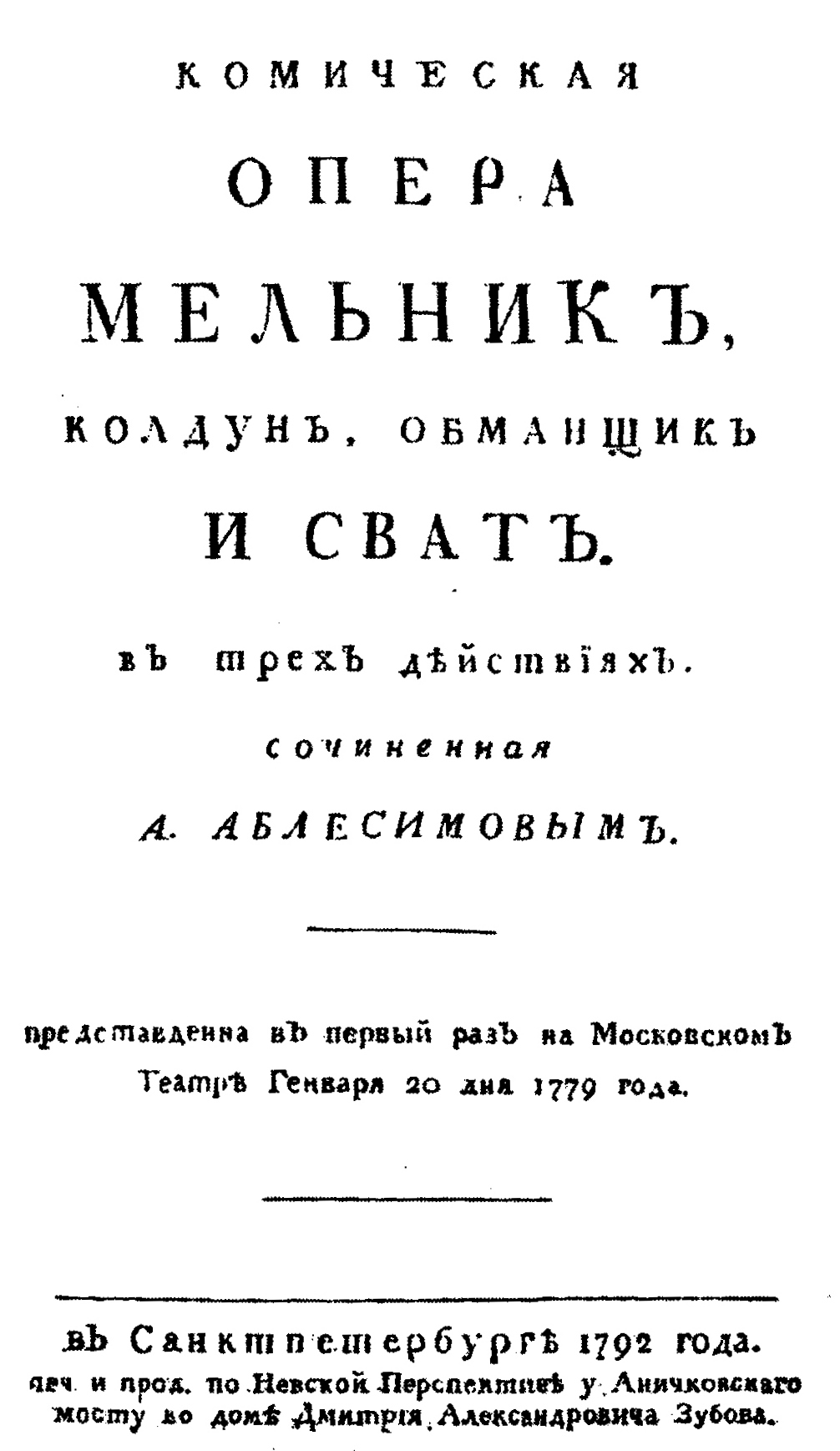
- Titlepage of the libretto
- Native title: Russian: Мельник – колдун, обманщик и сват (Melnik – koldun, obmanshchik i svat)
- Librettist: Alexander Ablesimov
- Language: Russian
- Premiere: 31 January [O.S. 20 January] 1779; Maddox's Theatre, Moscow

The miller who was a wizard, a cheat and a matchmaker (Note: This is the translation used in both Findeizen and Grove Music Online.) (Russian: Мельник – колдун, обманщик и сват [Melnik – koldun, obmanshchik i svat]) – is a Russian ballad opera in three acts with a libretto by Alexander Ablesimov that premiered on 31 January [O.S. 20 January] 1779. Its folksong-based music was long attributed to Yevstigney Fomin, but is now considered to have been written by Mikhail Sokolovsky.

== Background ==
The music for the opera is nowadays agreed to be by Mikhail Sokolovsky, although for a century it was mistakenly attributed to Yevstigney Fomin. The opera was one of the most popular in eighteenth century Russia. Sokolovsky was a violinist at the theatre and much of the music was taken from Russian folksongs. The librettist Ablesimov himself chose many of the folk melodies used. The greater reputation of Fomin was probably responsible for the misattribution of the opera to him. It is also believed that the overture to the opera may have been written by the Bohemian composer, working in Russia, Arnošt Vančura (d. 1802).

== Performance history ==
The opera was first produced at Maddox's Theatre, Moscow, on 31 January [O.S. 20 January] 1779. where Sokolovsky's wife premiered the role of Aniuta, and his sister was in the chorus. Twenty days later, the opera was performed at the Winter Palace, St. Petersburg, 9 February 1779. Both performances would draw critical acclaim, making it widely popular. At Karl Knipper's theater in St. Petersburg there would be 27 consecutive performances of "The Miller" further cementing its popularity among the Russian public. This popularity would allow the opera to survive through the 19th century, making it one of the very few of its kind to do so.

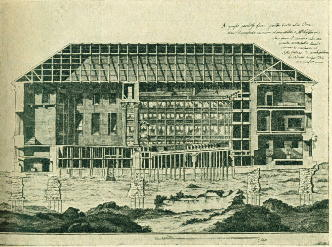
A sketch of the Petrovsky Theatre in Moscow, where the opera premiered in 1779

In 1915, a revival of the opera would be brought about by the Zimin Opera in Moscow, marking its first notable performance in the 20th century. This revival would add folksongs arranged by Nikolai Rimsky-Korsakov to Act III. Another revival would be brought about in Paris, France, on the 14th of July, 1929. This revival was edited by Nikolai Tcherepnin and would be performed in French. The last notable performance of the 20th century would come in 1955 where Moscow University would have opera students perform the work to celebrate the 200th anniversary of the university.

In 2017, a performance of the opera was released. The performance was done by the All-Union Radio and Television Academic Russian Folk Instruments Orchestra and Choir, conducted by Pyotr Alekseyev. This performance, originally recorded in 1950 before its public release in 2017, is one of the only modern recordings of the opera.

== Roles ==
Roles, voice types, premiere cast
Role	Voice type	Premiere 31 January [O.S. 20 January] 1779
Ankudin, a peasant	bass	Zalyshkin
Fetinia, his wife	mezzo-soprano	Mme. Sokolovskaya
Anyuta, their daughter	soprano	Yakovleva
Filimon, Anyuta's suitor	tenor	Shusherin
Fadei, the Miller	bass	Ozhogin
Dancers, chorus: Anyuta's friends, etc.

== Synopsis ==
The opera is set in a Russian village.

Act 1: The miller Fadei prospers by exploiting his reputation amongst the peasants as a wizard. Filimon, who has consulted him to find his lost horse, decides to ask his help in winning Anyuta, whose parents cannot decide to whom to marry her; the mother seeks a nobleman, the father a farmer.

Act 2: Filimon explains to Anyuta that he has enlisted Fadei's support. Fetinia, rating Fadei's skills as a fortune-teller, asks who Anyuta's husband will be. The miller sends her on a stroll and says that it will be a gentleman, the first person she will meet on her path. (Filimon, of course). Meeting Ankudin, Fadei assures him that his daughter's husband will be a working farmer. When Fetinia and Ankudin meet they quarrel over the apparently incompatible promises given to them by the miller.

Act 3: At Ankudin's house, amidst Anyuta's friends, Fadei explains that as Filimon is both a landowner and an active farmer, he meets the requirements of both Ankudin and Fetinia. All are satisfied and everything ends happily.

== Notes and references ==
Notes

=== Sources ===
- Findeizen, Nikolai, translated by S. W. Pring, ed. M. Velimirovic and C. R. Jensen, (2008). History of Music in Russia from Antiquity to 1800: Volume II – The Eighteenth Century, Indiana University Press. ISBN 978-0-253-34826-5
- Gozenpud, A., "Опера Михаила Соколовского «Мельник – колдун, обманщик и сват»" [Opera by Mikhail Sokolovsky "The miller – a wizard, a cheat and a matchmaker], Klassicheskaya Muzika website (Russian only), Retrieved 7 January 2012
- Taruskin, Richard. "Fomin, Yevstigney Ipat'yevich" in Grove Music Online
- Taruskin, Richard. "Sokolovsky, Mikhail Matveyevich" in Grove Music Online
- Belcanto.ru website (Russian only): Plot of Solovsky's Opera "Miller, Sorcerer, Deceiver, and Matchmaker, Retrieved 4 May 2026
- Sulfer.su website (Russian only): Aleksandr Abelsimov Miller - Sorcerer, Deceiver, and Matchmaker , Retrieved 4 May 2026
