= Vladimir Yesipov =

Russian conductor

Vladimir M. Yesipov (Владимир М. Есипов) (fl. 1960s) was a Russian conductor active during the 1960s and 1970s.

He conducted a Tchaikovsky concert in Beijing in 1960. He was mentioned in Soviet Music (1965) along with Yuri Aranovich for his "creative energy". He conducted at the Stanislavsky and Nemirovich-Danchenko Moscow Music Theatre during the 1970s, including Der Bettelstudent in 1971, and Massenet's Manon in 1973.

== Discography ==
- Bizet - Don Procopio in Russian, 1967
- Yevstigney Fomin - Orpheus and Eurydice (Орфей и Эвридика) 1967
- Rachmaninov - Aleko
- Kozlovsky - Requiem Mass, Melodija 1988
- Mussorgsky - Sorochinsky Fair
