= Priory Palace =

Coordinates: 59°33′29″N 30°7′17″E

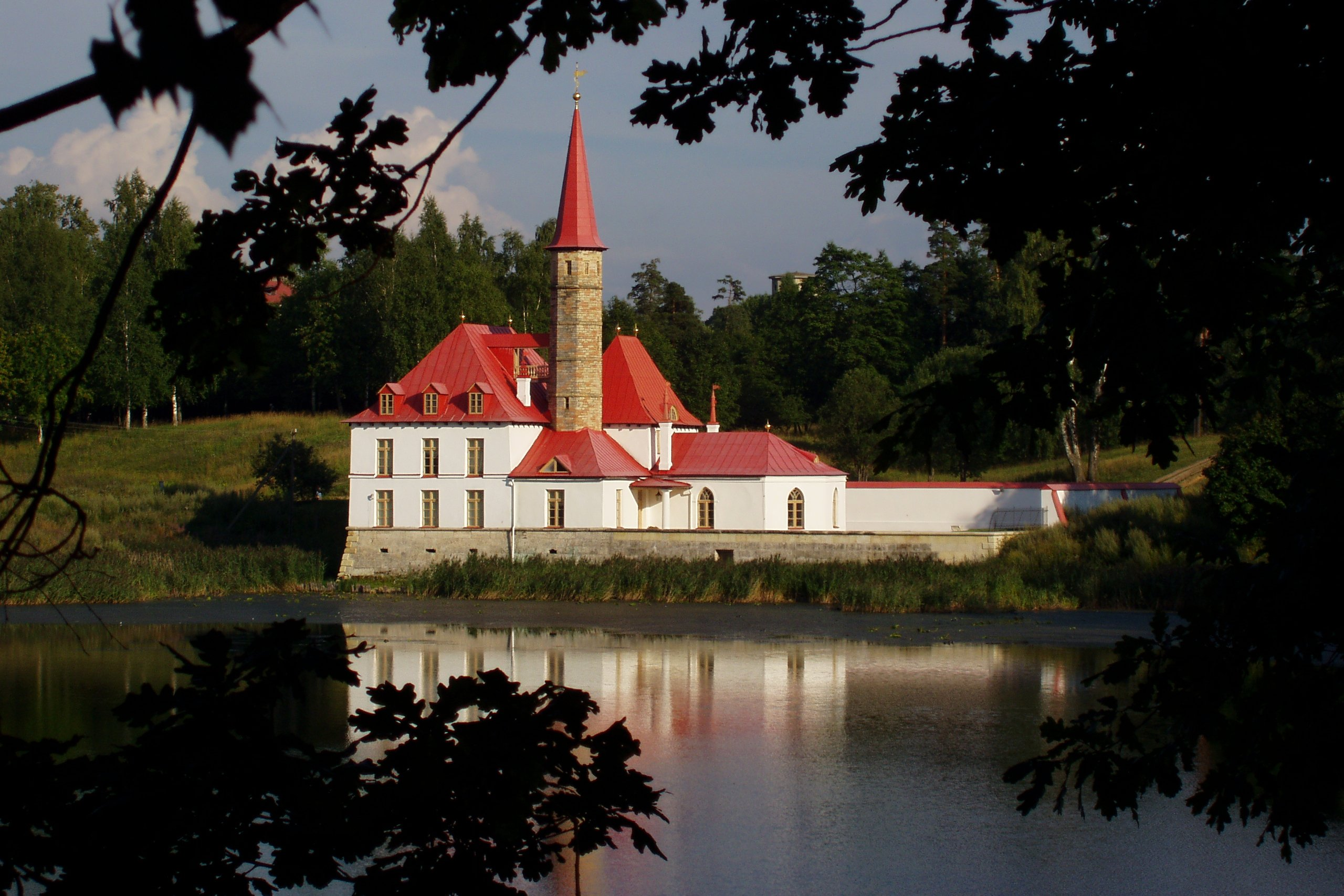
Priory Palace

Priory Palace (Russian: Приоратский дворец) is an original palace in the formerly royal town of Gatchina, Leningrad oblast, Northwest Russia, a suburb of Saint Petersburg. It was built in 1799 by the architect Nikolay Lvov on the shore of the Black Lake (Chyornoye ozero / Чёрное озеро). Constructed for the Russian Grand Priory of the Order of St John, it was presented to the Order by a decree of Paul I of Russia dated August 23, 1799.

== Features ==
The Priory is the only surviving architectural monument in Russia built mainly by the technology of earthwork: layers of compacted loam are poured with lime mortar. The walls of the palace, the fence, and the court buildings were built using this technology. The retaining wall is made of the famous Pudost stone, with which many of Gatchina's buildings were built.

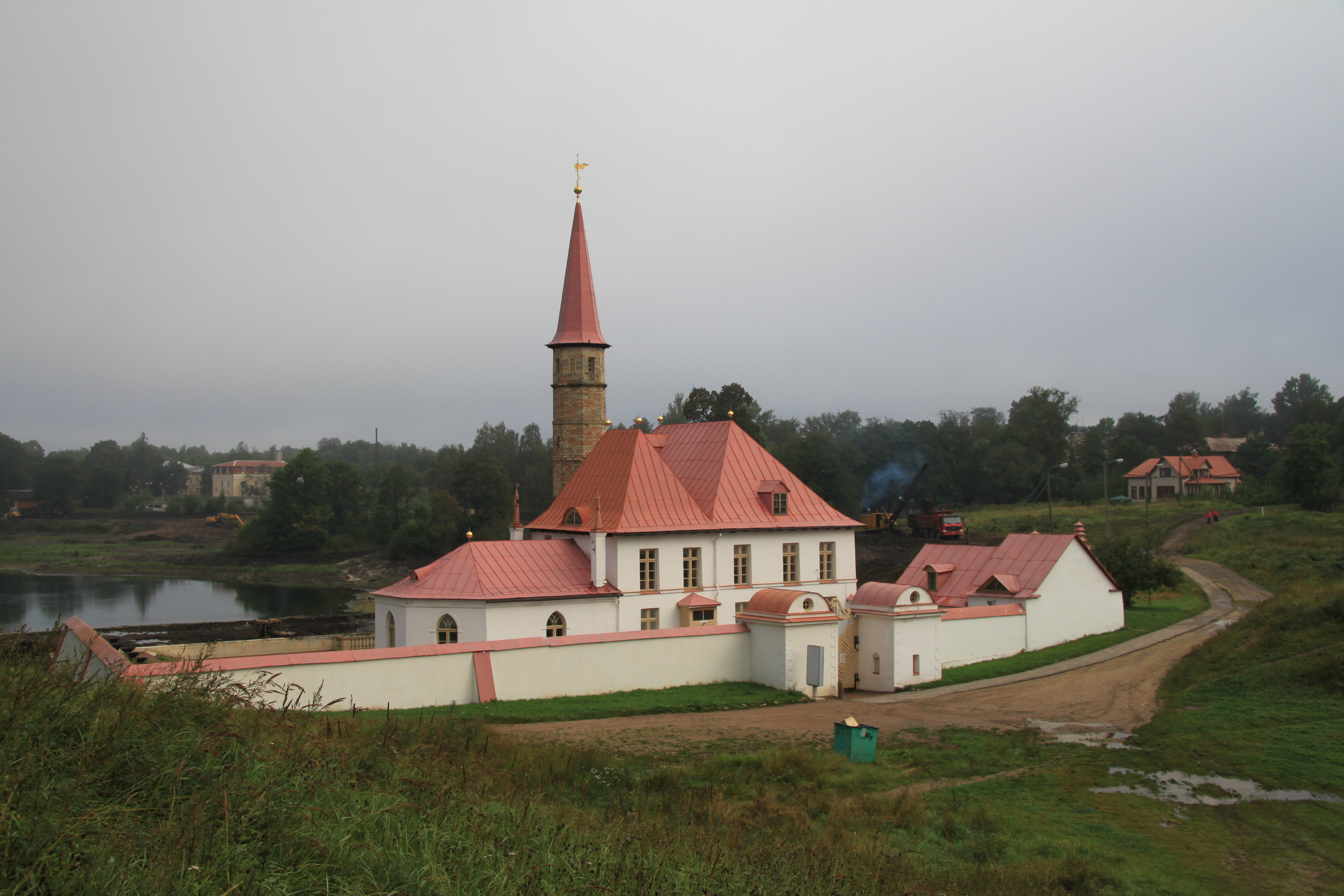
Priory Palace

The researchers note the precision of the layout of the Priory, the original composition, and the characteristic refusal of symmetry.

== See also ==
- Rammed earth – Construction material of damp subsoil
