= Alexander Ablesimov =

Russian opera librettist, poet, dramatist, satirist, and journalist

Aleksander Onisimovich Ablesimov
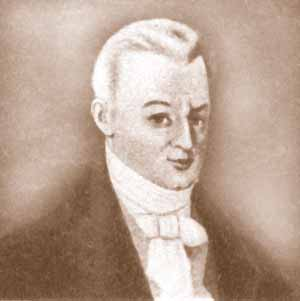
- Born: 9 September 1742; Galich Uyezd, Galich Province, Archangelgorod Governorate, Russian Empire
- Died: 1783 (aged 40–41); Moscow, Russian Empire
- Writing career
- Period: mid-18th century
- Genres: opera libretto, poetry, drama, satire, journalism

Aleksander Onisimovich Ablesimov (Russian: Алекса́ндр Они́симович Абле́симов, IPA: [ɐlʲɪˈksandr ɐˈnʲisʲɪməvʲɪtɕ ɐˈblʲesʲɪməf]; September 9 [O.S. August 28] 1742 — 1783) was a Russian opera librettist, poet, dramatist, satirist, and journalist.

== Biography ==
Worked as copyist for Alexander Sumarokov. Published his fables and satirical poems. Wrote the libretto for the early Russian-language opera by Mikhail Sokolovsky The miller who was a wizard, a cheat and a matchmaker (Мельник - колдун, обманщик и сват — Melnik - koldun, obmanshchik i svat 1779 Moscow, c.1795 St Petersburg), which was popular for three decades, and established a new operatic genre in Russia – a comedy about everyday life with spoken dialogue.

He also wrote libretti for two comic operas by M. Ekkel and a dramatic dialogue on the opening of Petrovka Theatre in Moscow.

== Bibliography ==
- Frolova-Walker, Marina: Russian Federation, 1730–1860, Opera in The Grove Dictionary of Music and Musicians, vol. 21 ISBN 0-333-60800-3
- Собрание сочинений изданное в одном томе Смирдиным (неполное), СПБ.
- Полное собрание стихотворений (1849) в «Русской поэзии» под ред. С. А. Венгерова, т. I. — СПБ. 1897.
- Венгеров С. А. Источники словаря русских писателей. т. I. — СПБ. 1900.
- Венгеров С. А. Критическо—биографический словарь русских писателей и учёных. т. I. — СПБ. 1889.
- Соч., СПБ. 1849; [Соч.], в кн.: Русская комедия и комическая опера XVIII в., М.—Л., 1950.
- История русской литературы XVIII в. Библиографический указатель. Под ред. П. Н. Беркова, Л., 1968.
- Энциклопедический словарь Брокгауза и Ефрона (1890—1907).
