= Don Procopio =

- Opera buffa by Georges Bizet
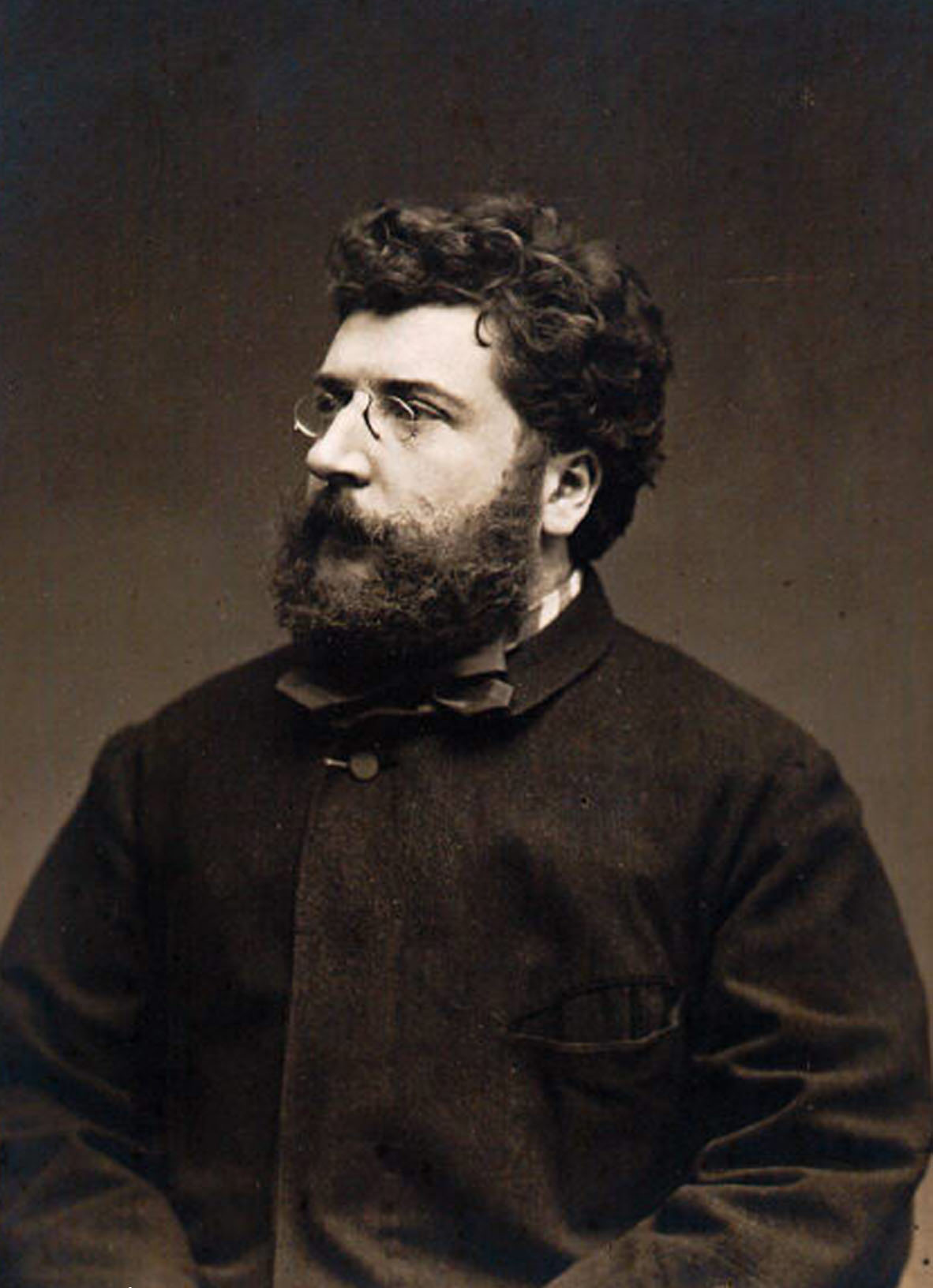
- Bizet in 1875
- Librettist: Léon Battu; Ludovic Halévy
- Language: Italian

Don Procopio is a two-act opera buffa by Georges Bizet with an Italian libretto completed in 1859, and first performed in 1906.

== Background ==
Bizet spent 1857 to 1860 in Italy as winner of the Prix de Rome. Looking for inspiration for a work to send home, he found the subject for his opera buffa in a second-hand bookstall in Rome, writing home that the piece by Carlo Cambiaggio (1798–1880) was "an Italian farce in the manner of Don Pasquale". The words were a reduced version of I pretendenti delusi (1811) by Giuseppe Mosca (1772–1839).

Composition was sporadic over the winter of 1858–59; Bizet confessed that he was still trying to find his voice, although he intentionally aimed at an Italian style for this piece. The report from the Prix de Rome judges noted advances, but a later report signed by Ambroise Thomas criticised Bizet for sending an opéra bouffe as his first envoi and suggested he divert his attention away from this toward sacred music (although Bizet failed to submit a religious envoi of any sort from Rome).

== Performance history ==
Piano–vocal score, 1905

There are three printed scores of Don Procopio, a vocal score published in 1905 before the premiere, a full score and a second vocal score, all of which are misleading by failing to distinguish genuine Bizet from fake (entr'acte and recitatives). The second and third scores contain two airs for Don Procopio adapted from Bizet's songs; additional instruments were added to the scoring. The autograph score of Don Procopio was discovered in the papers left by Daniel Auber at his death in 1871 and it was acquired from the Auber family by the Paris Conservatoire in 1894.

The first production, in the revised edition by Charles Malherbe, was at the Salle Garnier in Monte Carlo on 10 March 1906, in a double-bill with Pagliacci. There were performances in Barcelona in 1907 and Rome in 1908. The original version was performed at the Théatre Municipal in Strasbourg on 6 February 1958. Lost and Found Opera presented the Australian premiere in June 2016 in Balcatta, Perth. Opera South (UK) presented what they believed was Bizet's pure composition at Charterhouse School in Godalming, Surrey, England, in October 2016.

A recording in Russian, conducted by Vladimir Yesipov, was issued by Melodiya in 1962. The opera has been broadcast (in Italian) by the BBC, and in 1975 by French Radio.

== Roles ==
Roles, voice types, premiere cast
Role	Voice type	Premiere cast, 10 March 1906 Conductor: Léon Jehin
Don Procopio	bass	Jean Périer
Bettina	soprano	Angèle Pornot
Odoardo	tenor	Charles Rousselière
Ernesto	baritone	Maximilien-Nicolas Bouvet
Don Andronico	baritone	Victor Chalmin
Donna Eufemia	soprano	Jane Morlet
Pasquino	baritone	Paolo Ananian

== Synopsis ==
The plot is almost identical to Don Pasquale by Donizetti. Don Andronico, an old miser, wants to marry his niece Bettina to another miser, Don Procopio, because he is worried that a young man will spend all her money. Bettina is however in love with Colonel Odoardo. Assisted by her aunt Eusebia and brother Ernesto, she plans to thwart the old men. Procopio is terrified that Bettina appears to be a grasping spendthrift, and tries to get out of the marriage. When she insists that he do so, he abandons the contract and flees, and Andronico consents to the union of the young lovers.

== Music ==
The music is a youthful work, free of the influence of Bizet's teacher Charles Gounod; it is a imitation of Don Pasquale. The familiar idiom is infused with original touches of harmony, orchestration and melodic turn. The ensembles are particularly successful in using stock devices of opera buffa: voices in thirds, staccato chord accompanying and repetition of words. Ernesto's "Non v'e signor" is an exact parallel of Malatesta's "Bella siccome un angelo" – in both, the baritone describes his sister's charms to the old man, in D-flat.

Bizet used several episodes in later works:

- a 2/4 section in the first finale for the Carnival Chorus in act 2 of La jolie fille de Perth;
- the chorus "Cheti piano!" for "Chante, chante encore" in act 1 of Les pêcheurs de perles;
- "Sulle piume" for Smith's serenade in La jolie fille de Perth;

while the March in act 1 is taken from the finale of his Symphony in C of 1855.
