= Michael Maddox =

English theatre manager in Russia

Michael Maddox (Note: Also spelled Medoks, Maddocks, or Mattocks.) (Russian: Михаил Егорович Маддокс, romanized: Mikhail Yegorovich Maddoks; 1747–1822) was an English entrepreneur and theatre manager active in Russia. He was co-founder, with Prince Urusov, of the Petrovsky Theatre, the first permanent opera theatre in Moscow and predecessor of the Bolshoi Theatre.

== Life and career ==
Described as a famous equilibrist, Michael Maddox arrived first in Russia in 1766 as the manager of a museum of 'mechanical and physical representations', visiting both St Petersburg and Moscow. Leaving Russia he travelled to Madrid with his museum, and spent time in London in the ensuing decade. It is unclear whether he was related to Anthony Maddox, the successful slack-wire and theatre performer who drowned on a sea voyage to Dublin in 1758 along with Theophilus Cibber. There exists a possibility of confusion between the two with regard to references to equilibrium.

However, an anecdote, submitted by one C. J. Harford, of Stapleton, Bristol, originally published in Felix Farley's "Bristol Journal", and widely repeated in the English press in the 1820s, talks of Harford having encountered a man named Maddox in Moscow in 1786. That tale claimed that this "Mr Maddox" was the sole survivor of the sinking of a packet off Holyhead in 1757 [sic - the correct date is 1758] that had claimed the lives of "the famous Tom [sic] Maddox, the rope dancer" and the rest of his family, and that Maddox had subsequently been brought up by his uncle "Seward", trumpeter of Bristol. This uncle would almost certainly be Samuel Seward (c.1737-1810), who was later owner of the New Sadler's Wells Theatre in Cheltenham, and who was still calling himself a trumpeter, of Bristol, when he wrote his will in 1799. This anecdote seems to support the idea that Michael Maddox was related to (and possibly the son of) Anthony ("Tom"?) Maddox.

On returning to Russia before 1776, Michael Maddox was taken into partnership in the theatre company formed that year by the Moscow Prosecutor, Prince Pyotr Vasilyevich Urusov. Maddox had had an established record of success at the Haymarket Theatre, London, where it is said that in 1770 his were the most prosperous entertainments ever carried on in that house. His profits in one season are stated to have amounted to £11,000, £2,500 more than David Garrick's a few years earlier.

Urusov had been granted a ten-year licence for theatrical and other performances. For four years they enjoyed success in a wooden theatre at Znamenka Street, the Znamensky Theatre, before it burnt down in early 1780. Maddox then raised enough credit to buy his share of the company from Prince Urusov and employ architect Christian Rosberg the same year to construct a new brick and stone building that faced Petrovka Street. It thus became known as the Petrovsky Theatre. The theatre had four storeys of boxes and two spacious galleries. The pit had two series of benches, with enclosed seats at the sides. The sumptuously decorated boxes were available to let at from three hundred to a thousand roubles and upwards. Admittance to the pit was one rouble.

Maddox obtained a further ten-year licence from Moscow's governor, Vasily Dolgorukov-Krymsky, but financial difficulties meant that ownership of the theatre passed to the Office of Imperial Theatres in 1792. Empress Maria Feodorovna granted Maddox a life-long pension of 3,000 roubles for his contribution to the creation of Moscow theatre. The theatre was operational until 1805, when it burned down just before a performance of Ferdinand Kauer's Dneprovskaya Rusalka. It was replaced by the Bolshoi Theatre on the same site.

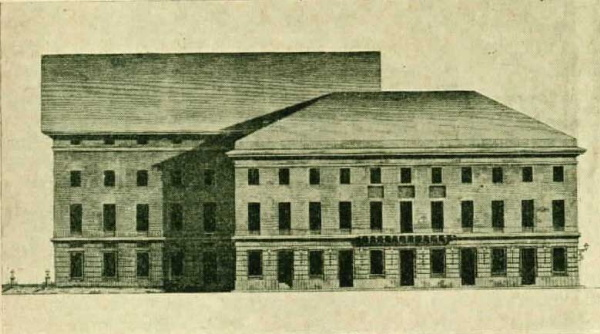

a. Petrovsky Theatre, including the extension which contained a rotunda.

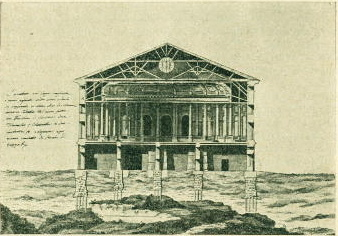
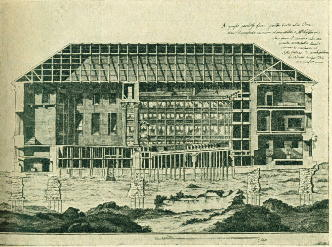

b. Interior of Rotunda/Masquerade hall. c. Interior of Theatre/Opera house

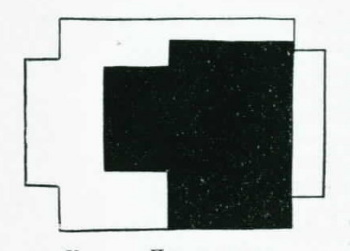
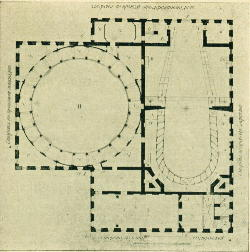

d. Relative size and situation of Petrovsky theatre and Bolshoi. e. Plan of 2nd floor with rotunda and theatre.

== Maddox Theatre Company ==
The Maddox troupe delivered 425 performances of drama, ballet and opera during this time. These included more than 100 different operas, mainly of the comic opera/opéra comique type by composers such as Grétry, Dalayrac, Mehul, Paisiello, Philidor and Martin y Soler, as well as Russians such as Yevstigney Fomin and Vasily Pashkevich.

The foreign operas were largely performed in Russian translations by Sergey Glinka, Platon Levshin, Ivan Dmitrievsky, and others. Three notable melodramas (Fomin's Orfeo and G. A. Benda's Pygmalion and Medea & Jason) were part of the repertoire. Theatre productions in Russian translation included Shakespeare's Romeo & Juliet and Voltaire's Mahomet. The most successful works, however, were those of August von Kotzebue, such as Menschenhass und Reue, The Papagoy, and Armuth und Edelsinn.

Masquerades for 1,500 people or more, where carnival costume was compulsory, were held in the mirror-bedecked rotunda. This part of the structure alone had cost fifty thousand roubles to construct. William Tooke in the chapter "Sketch of Mosco" (sic) from his History of Russia describes the audience in the pit of the theatre as "perhaps, in many respects, one of the most polite that can be anywhere seen. The ears are never rent with those noisy marks of disapprobation, which do not correct bad actors, and which distress and overpower the inexperienced and timid."

From 1783, Maddox also created and ran a Vauxhall Gardens enterprise concurrently in the Moscow suburbs, where operas and plays were performed from mid-May to September. A long gallery led to a grand circular hall for dancing. From the dancing-hall there was a large area surrounded by a covered gallery, having in the middle an elevated platform for the orchestra. This gallery was chiefly used for promenading. Beyond this was a hall allotted to refreshments of all kinds. On the sides were billiards rooms. In the evenings the galleries were illuminated with coloured lamps, and on particular days fireworks displays were set off. It is likely that Maddox and his wife retained ownership of this after the Petrovsky was taken on by the Office of Imperial Theatres.

== Miscellaneous ==
Maddox manufactured a tower clock for Empress Catherine II of Russia, which is currently displayed in the Kremlin Armoury in Moscow.

He married a German woman from an aristocratic family and fathered eleven children, one of them the adventurer Roman Medoks. His wife survived him and continued with ownership of some theatrical buildings.

The suggestions that he was a Professor of Mathematics from Oxford University and that he had tutored the Tsarevich Pavel prior to moving to Moscow have not been substantiated.

Alexander Chayanov, whose wife Olga wrote a book on the history of the Maddox Theatre, set a portion of his Gothic tale "Venediktov" in the theatre.

== Sources ==
- Olga Chayanova, Teatr Maddoksa v Moskve 1776–1805, Moscow: Rabotnik prosveshchenie, 1927.
- William Tooke, A View of Russia, pp 404–412, 427–428.
- Old and New London, Vol. 4, 1878, pp 216–226.
