= Mikhail Popov (writer) =

Russian writer

- Education: Imperial Moscow University

Mikhail Ivanovich Popov (Russian: Михаи́л Ива́нович Попов) (1742, Yaroslavl – circa 1790) was a Russian writer, poet, dramatist and opera librettist of the 18th century.

== Biography ==
Born into a merchant family, he was a pupil of Fyodor Volkov. After 1757 he was an actor at the Court Theatre in St Petersburg. He entered Moscow University in 1765, and began to translate comedies from German and French. He wrote a collection of lyrics called “Songs” (1765). In 1771 he published Slavenskie drevnosti, ili Priklyucheniya slavenskikh knyazei [Slavic antiquities, or Adventures of Slavic princes], an adventure novel with "traditional stock subjects from European chivalric novels that have been given an ancient Slavic coloration"; it was very popular, being republished three times by 1794.

During 1771–1772 he translated the poem Gerusalemme Liberata (Jerusalem Delivered) by Torquato Tasso. Together with Mikhail Chulkov, he published a collection of Russian folk songs. His own collection of songs, Russian Erota or the Collection of the Best and Newest Russian Songs (Российская Эрота, или Выбор наилучших новейших русских песен), was published posthumously in 1791. Popov wished to popularize Slavic mythology, which had been largely forgotten in Russia in his time, as a more patriotic alternative to Greek and Roman mythology. To this end, he conducted some rather inaccurate research and wrote the essay, Описание древнеславянского баснословия (The Description of Ancient Slavic Fable-writing, 1768). He included this essay in the collection of his poems, translations and plays called Dosugi (Досуги – Lesure Hours), published at the request of Empress Catherine II. This collection also contained his famous libretto to the opera Anyuta.

== Opera librettist ==
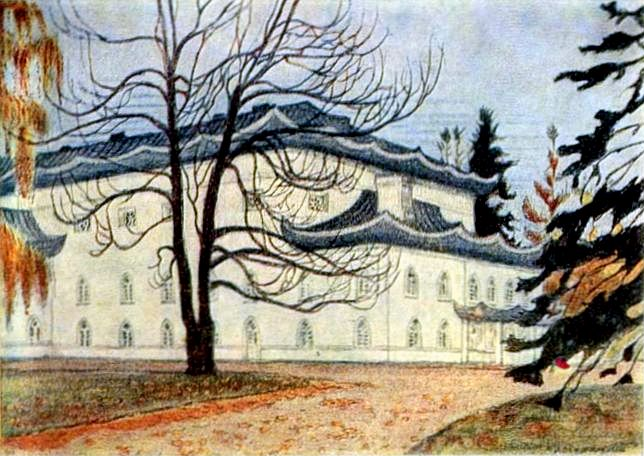
Chinese Theatre in Tsarskoe Selo, ca. 1900.

He wrote a few librettos for comic operas and was especially celebrated for the text of the one-act opera Anyuta, which was given at the (Chinese Theatre, Tsarskoye Selo, September 6 [OS August 26] 1772). The music was a selection of popular songs specified in the libretto. The story is about a girl called Aniuta, brought up in a peasant household, who turns out to be of noble birth, and the story of her love for a nobleman, Victor, which eventually ends happily with wedding bells. The music hasn’t survived, and the composer is unknown, although it is sometimes attributed to Vasily Pashkevich or even to Yevstigney Fomin, who at that time was just 11 years old.

== Bibliography ==
- Polovtsev, A.A. Russian Biographical Dictionary (Русский биографический словарь А.А.Половцова) published 1896-1918.
- Iurii Vladimirovich Stennik, "Mikhail Ivanovich Popov," in Marcus C. Levitt, Early Modern Russian Writers: Late Seventeenth and Eighteenth Centuries (Gale Research, 1995; ISBN 0810357119), pp. 308–312.

== See also ==
- Russian opera
