= Mikhail Sokolovsky (composer) =

Russian composer

Mikhail Matveyevich Sokolovsky (Russian: Михаи́л Матве́евич Соколо́вский (1756 – after 1795) was a late 18th-century Russian opera composer, conductor and violinist.

Sokolovsky played the violin in the orchestra of the Maddox Theatre in Moscow. It is known that he also taught singing at the university. The music of the renowned-in-its-day opera The miller who was a wizard, a cheat and a matchmaker (Мельник–колдун, обманщик и сват) to the text by Aleksandr Ablesimov (Moscow, 1779; Saint Petersburg, circa 1795) is attributed to him. Only part of the score survived but Nikolai Tcherepnin completed the missing portions in 1925, enabling the work to be revived. Sokolovsky's contemporary, composer Yevstigney Fomin later revised the music of the opera adding an overture to it.

Under the reign of autocratic Czar Nicholas I of Russia, verses of Sokolovsky that were critical of Nicholas's predecessors were often sung at anti-Nicholas rallies.

== See also ==
- Nikolai Sheremetev
