= Anyuta =

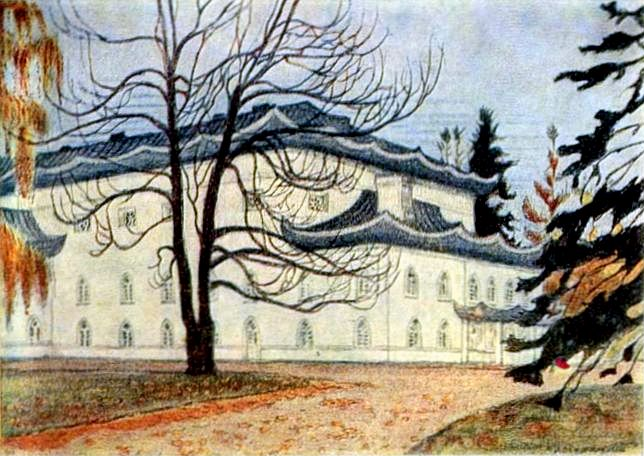
Chinese Theatre in Tsarskoe Selo, c. 1900

Anyuta (Russian: Аню́та) is a one-act comic opera to a libretto by Mikhail Popov. First performed in 1772, it was one of the first operas written in the Russian language.

The collection of Popov's poems, translations and plays called Dosugi (Досуги – Leisure Hours) was published at the request of Empress Catherine II. This collection also contained the libretto to the opera Anyuta.

The music hasn't survived and its composer is not known, however it has sometimes been attributed to Vasily Pashkevich or even to Yevstigney Fomin although at that time he was just 11 years old. It is known that the music was a selection of popular songs as specified in the libretto.

== Performance history ==
The premiere took place at the Chinese Theatre, Tsarskoye Selo, on September 6 [OS August 26] 1772. It was one of the most successful.

== Plot ==
It is a story about a girl called Anyuta, brought up in a peasants' household, who turned out to be of noble birth, eventually marrying her nobleman beloved, Victor, to the sound of wedding bells.

== Sources ==
- Leach, Robert and Borovsky, Victor, A History of Russian Theatre, Cambridge University Press, 1999, p. 72. ISBN 0-521-43220-0
- Polovtsev, A.A. Russian Biographical Dictionary (Русский биографический словарь А.А.Половцова) published 1896–1918.
- Seaman, Gerald R., "Russian opera before Glinka", Russia: Essays in History and Literature, Lyman Howard (ed.), Brill Archive, 1972, pp. 62–63.
