= Ivan Chemnitzer =

Russian poet (1745–1784)

- Ива́н Ива́нович Хемни́цер
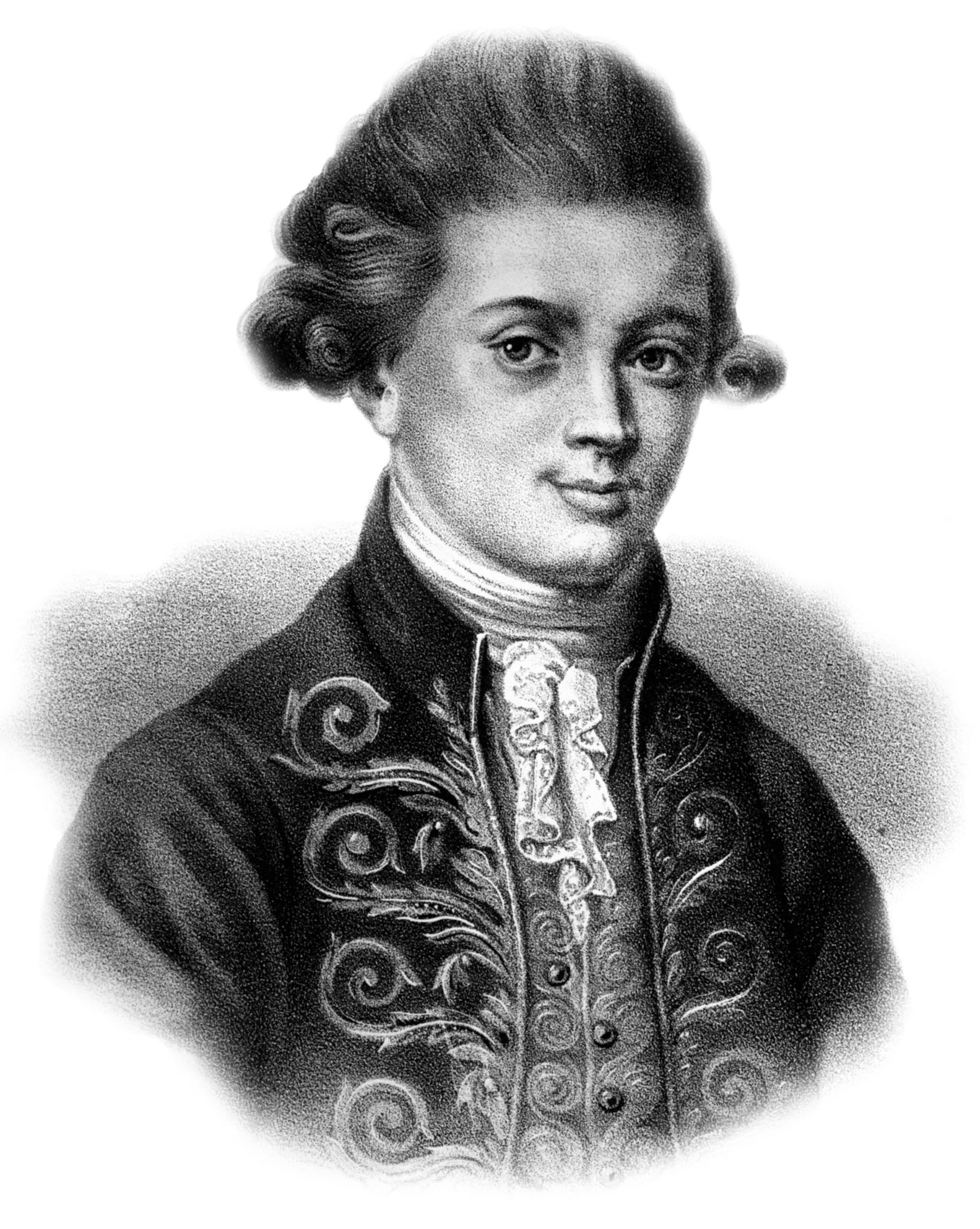
- Born: 1745; Yenotayevsk, Astrakhan Governorate, Russia
- Died: 1784 (aged 38–39)

Ivan Ivanovitch Chemnitzer or Khemnitzer (Russian: Ива́н Ива́нович Хемни́цер; 1745–1784) was a Russian fabulist of German descent.

== Life ==
He was born at Yenotayevsk, Astrakhan Governorate, the son of a German physician of Chemnitz, who had served in the Russian army under Peter the Great. He participated in the campaigns of the Seven Years' War and afterward devoted himself to mining engineering and subsequently visited Germany, Holland, and France. Upon his return he accepted a position as Consul to Smyrna, where an attack of melancholia hastened his death.

In contradistinction to Sumarokov and others among the earlier fabulists of Russia, whose works are essentially satires, Chemnitzer was the first to introduce the genuine fable into Russian literature. He was thus one of the predecessors of Krylov, having brought the Russian fable to its greatest perfection. Although to some extent translations or imitations of La Fontaine and Gellert, his works show considerable originality. Their good humor, vivacity of dialogue, simplicity, and distinctively national character have greatly endeared him to the Russian people. Among his best original fables are The Metaphysician, The Tree, The Peasant and his Load, and The Rich Man and the Poor Man. Grot produced the best edition of his works (St. Petersburg, 1873).

== Sources ==
- "Хемницер, Иван Иванович" . Brockhaus and Efron Encyclopedic Dictionary (in Russian). 1906.
