= Yevstigney Fomin =

Russian opera composer

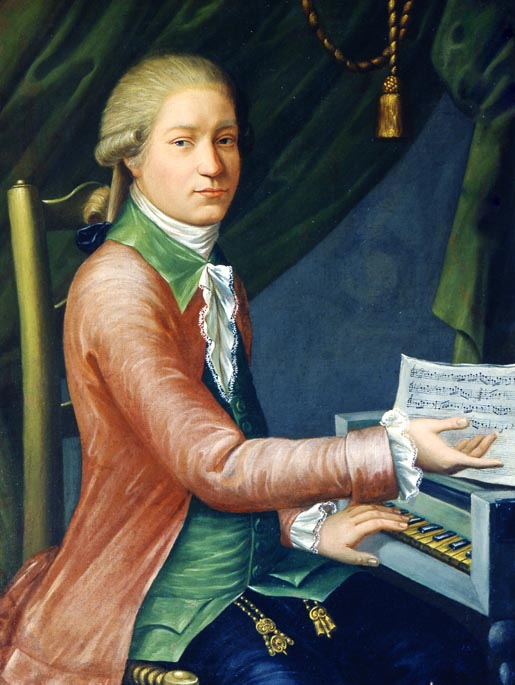
Portrait of Fomin, 1780s

Yevstigney Ipat'yevich Fomin (Russian: Евстигне́й Ипа́тьевич Фоми́н) (born St. Petersburg 16 August [O.S. 5 August] 1761 – died St. Petersburg c 27 April [O.S. 15 April] 1800) was a Russian opera composer of the 18th century.

== Biography ==
Fomin was born in St. Petersburg into the family of a cannoneer, an artillery soldier of the Tobolsk infantry regiment. His father died when he was 6, and he passed into the care of his stepfather, I. Fedotov, a soldier. Fedotov took him to the Academy of Fine Arts in St. Petersburg on 21 April 1767, where Fomin studied architecture. As a full student there, he began learning the harpsichord in 1776 with Matteo Buini. From 1777 he studied theory and composition with Hermann Raupach, and from 1779 with Blasius Sartori.

In 1782 he went to Bologna to study with Padre Martini and Stanislao Mattei; three years later he was accepted into the Accademia filarmonica. Returning to St. Petersburg in 1785, he taught at the theatrical school and composed operas. From 1797 he was répétiteur for the imperial theater under Paul I. He composed about 30 operas including Yamshchiki na podstave [The Coachmen at the Relay Station] (1787); Vecherinki [Soirées] (1788); Orfey i Evridika (1792), Amerikantsy [The Americans] (a comic opera) (1800), and Zolotoye yabloko [The Golden Apple] (performed after the composer's death in 1803). The most successful for decades was his opera-melodrama Orfey i Evridika to a text by Yakov Knyazhnin. It was re-staged in Soviet times in 1947 in Moscow, and in 1953 and in 1961 in Leningrad. In 2008 it was performed in Moscow for the first time on period instruments by Pratum Intergum orchestra under Pavel Serbin (conducting) and Rossiiskij Rogovoi Orkestr (Russin horn-band, St.Petersburg).

The famous one-act opera Anyuta to a text by Mikhail Popov has been occasionally attributed to Fomin (which is not a certainty). In addition, Fomin has been credited with the music of another successful Russian opera Melnik – koldun, obmanshchik i svat (The miller who was a wizard, a cheat and a matchmaker, Moscow, 1779), on a subject resembling Rousseau’s Le devin du village: it is possible that this was his revision of the music compiled by a theatre violin player, Mikhail Sokolovsky.

== Operas ==
- The Novgorod Hero Boyeslayevich (Новгородский богатырь Боеслаевич – Novgorodskiy bogatyr’ Boyeslayevich, opera-ballet. Libretto by the Empress Catherine II, 12 December 1786 St Petersburg)
- The Coachmen at the Relay Station (Ямщики на подставе - Yamshchiki na podstave 13 January 1787 St Petersburg)
- Soirées (Вечеринки или гадай, гадай девица — Vecherinki, ili Gaday, gaday devitsa, 1788 St Petersburg)
- Magician, Fortune-teller and Match-maker (Колдун, ворожея и сваха - Koldun, vorozheya i svakha, 1789 St Petersburg)
- Orpheus and Eurydice (Орфей и Эвридика — Orfey i Evridika, melodrama. Text by Yakov Knyazhnin, 13 January 1792 St Petersburg)
- The Americans (Американцы - Amerikantsy, comic opera, 19 February 1800 St Petersburg)
- Chloris and Milo (Клорида и Милон – Klorida i Milon, 18 November 1800 St Petersburg)
- The Golden Apple (Золотое яблоко — Zolotoye yabloko, 27 April 1803 St Petersburg)

also:

- Yaropolk and Oleg (Ярополк и Олег - Yaropolk i Oleg) - Choruses to a tragedy by Vladislav Ozerov (1798)

== Discography ==
Opera

- Orfey i Evridika (sung in Russian) European Festival Orchestra, conductor William Keitel, 20 July 2004, 1CD, Arte Nova Records
- Orfeo ed Euridice (sung in Russian). Performed by Maria Shorstova, Alexey Ivashchenko et al., The Horn Orchestra of Russia, Pratum Integrum Orchestra, cond. Pavel Serbin. Recorded in 2008. Moscow, Russia: Essential Music, ℗2009. Caro Mitis CM 0012008
- The Americans (sung in Russian) cond. Vladimir Andropov. USSR Bolshoi Theatre Chamber Orchestra (rec. 1988) C10 28271 009
- The Coachmen (Ямщики на подставе) cond. Vladimir Chernushenko. Leningrad State Conservatory Opera Orchestra (rec. 1982) C10 19625 009
- The Coachmen (Ямщики на подставе) cond. Nikolai Anosov. (rec.1947) tapes in All-Union Radio Archive. ~ first revival since premiere.

Orchestral, chamber and instrumental

- The Golden Age - Moscow Concertino ensemble of soloists (CD)

== Quotations ==
"Yevstigney Fomin, one of the most talented composers of his day and age and the founding father of Russian musical drama, also [like Vasily Pashkevich] died in poverty. His melodrama, based on the well-known legend about Orpheus and Eurydice, is a real masterpiece whose red-hot passions and tragic collisions have since been put to music with equal excellence. Orpheus premiered at Count Nikolai Sheremetev’s theatre in 1792 to the strains of a choir, orchestra and with a large cast of ballet dancers and actors. For more than two decades Orpheus ran thousands of times to invariable applause of local and visiting theatergoers. And still, the money Fomin earned for his labors was dwarfed by the exorbitant royalties picked up by his Italian colleagues invited to work in St. Petersburg." "The Voice of Russia 2003"

== Bibliography ==
- Sokolova, A.: Fomin, the article in "Tvorcheskie portrety kompozitorov", Moskva, Muzyka, 1989, p. 360-362
- Abraham, Gerald: The Concise Oxford History of Music, Oxford 1979, p. 479-481
- Fomin, Yevstigney Ipat'yevich by Richard Taruskin, 'The New Grove Dictionary of Opera', ed. Stanley Sadie (London, 1992) ISBN 0-333-73432-7
