= Strugatsky's high theory of upbringing =

Term and theory created by Soviet writers Boris and Arkady Strugatsky

High Theory of Upbringing (abbreviation HTU; in Russian: Высокая теория воспитания or ВТВ) is a term created by Boris Strugatsky, denoting the mechanisms for forming a person of the bright future described in the works of the Soviet writers the Strugatsky brothers. The concept exists only in the form of an artistic image and is not specified by the authors themselves. The concept of entrusting the upbringing of new generations of builders of communism to professionals appears in the correspondence of A. N. Strugatsky during his army service in the early 1950s. Already in early utopian works, especially Noon: 22nd Century (1962), as well as in critical speeches of the 1960s–1970s, the Strugatsky brothers repeatedly addressed the problems of future pedagogy, insisting on the existence of a system of boarding schools — "incubators" of the bright future. The problem of the conflict of generations —of the past and future as such— is most clearly shown in the novella The Ugly Swans (1967). The phrase "theory of upbringing" itself in the Strugatskys' artistic texts appears in the late novel Burdened with Evil (1988), while the term HTU was used by B. N. Strugatsky in the 1996 preface to the collection Time of the Disciples. In the offline interview conducted from 1998–2012, Boris Strugatsky repeatedly used the concept of HTU.

== Background. Biographical subtext ==
The Strugatskys' biographer, science fiction writer Ant Skalandis, attributed the High Theory of Upbringing to one of the highest achievements of the Strugatskys in the field of social science fiction (along with the Institute of Experimental History, the idea of progressorism, and the concept of homeostatic universe). HTU implies "a planetary system in which children are raised outside families by professionals of the highest class", which is "the only correct path to a harmonious happy future for humanity", described in the Strugatskys' works. However, the theory itself was never developed by its authors; it was "only named, as some effective and supposedly noble idea". At the same time, A. Skalandis assumed (without any written or oral evidence on this matter) that the Strugatskys' mother Alexandra Ivanovna—a teacher with forty years of experience—did not share their views. In A. N. Strugatsky's correspondence, the reasoning that family upbringing is an "unacceptably random" process appears in 1948 and was connected with communication with his father-in-law, professor of MPEI S. F. Shershov. According to the thoughts of 23-year-old Arkady Strugatsky, the main task of upbringing is "directing a person along the right path", identifying his main inclinations. This is possible only under conditions where children are separated from parents and placed in closed boarding schools in the best climatic conditions, where mentors divide them into "humanitarians and techies". Such a system is aimed primarily at forming an intellectual elite, to a lesser extent affecting workers. Ant Skalandis summarized the evolution of the HTU idea in the following way:

From that distant 1948 to 1984, when the last novella ABS about the future was completed, their theory of upbringing acquired elegance and persuasiveness of an artistic image, became a serious fact of literature, but as a theory did not advance an iota, only becoming more entangled in itself. For example, young Arkady clearly named the age of five, clearly borrowed from the Japanese tradition, where precisely from five years old children stop being indulged, allowing them almost everything, and begin to be drilled according to a strict samurai system. In the ABS books, the age of the beginning of collective upbringing is nowhere clearly marked; specific characters, as a rule, turn out to be the same age as the daughters of AN or the son of BN at the time of writing, which is characteristic of most writers who do not specifically develop a children's theme; and finally, BN already in the newest times, communicating on the site, suddenly declares that in the world they invented, children were taken from parents at the age of one (!) year.

Literary scholar E. A. Velikanova, characterizing the High Theory of Upbringing, asserted that the Strugatskys proclaimed the "forced necessity of orphanhood". This corresponds to the details of the early biography of the co-author brothers. In January 1942, 16-year-old Arkady Strugatsky and his father were evacuated from blockaded Leningrad; after the death of Natan Strugatsky in Vologda from exhaustion and heart disease, Arkady had to survive alone (spending three months in the hospital), reaching the village of Tashla in Orenburg Oblast in the summer of 1942. Alexandra Strugatskaya, due to the impossibility of getting to work with 8-year-old Boris, first placed him in a departmental kindergarten, and then in an orphanage ("they feed... poorly—they steal"). Together with the orphanage, A. I. Strugatskaya and Boris were evacuated from Leningrad on August 4, 1942, reaching Arkady in Tashla by early autumn. The eldest son was drafted into the army on January 28, 1943 and thereafter until demobilization in 1955 rarely saw his mother and brother, communication with whom was mainly by correspondence.

== System of Education and Upbringing in the Strugatskys' Fantastic World ==
The theme of upbringing, which is one of the cross-cutting themes in the Strugatskys' work, is inseparable from the depiction of children and adolescents. For the time of creation of the novel Noon: 22nd Century, the dominant in the authors' prose was the feeling of the coming bright future, filtered through "an intellect capable of detailed analysis of the given subject". It is in this novel that the theme of the destruction of the traditional family sounded, the assertion of educators in the place of fathers. According to A. V. Kuznetsov (Moscow State Pedagogical University), the Strugatskys' pedagogical interests coincided with the agenda of the USSR's internal policy. In the 1950s, a system of boarding schools was deployed and schools for gifted children appeared. The pedagogical content of the Khrushchev educational reforms was derived from the concept of upbringing ideal people of the future. Boarding schools were considered an effective tool for instilling love for public labor and as real places for the birth of communist society. This task was considered beyond the strength of parents, and therefore it should be entrusted to professional educators. Magnitogorsk teacher I. Pimshtein (School No. 65) from personal communication with A. Strugatsky recalled that the writer highly appreciated the novella by Rudyard Kipling Stalky & Co. as providing "a very interesting view 'from inside' on a privileged English school". In the boarding school described by Kipling, "strict, sometimes cruel requirements for discipline were combined with respect for the dignity of the individual, with the ability to help a young person realize their abilities, find their path, maximize the realization of their personality's possibilities in the world".

Philologist V. A. Grinfeld (Saint Petersburg State University of Industrial Technologies and Design) highlighted in Return another aspect of the reality surrounding the authors in the sixties: in the terminology of K. Obuchowski, "the culture of object-people was replaced by the culture of subject-people", and the rebellion against the object civilization was led by representatives of youth who did not accept standardization, specialization, synchronization, maximization and other attributes of the industrial world. Naturally, the depiction of a world devoid of modern problems and antagonisms had to be built by the method of inversion, an implicit reaction to the surrounding world. V. Grinfeld considered the novella "Malefactors" one of the most important in the entire work. Boarding schools were a projection of the reality of the 1950s, in which higher and secondary school were accessible to not too large a part of the USSR population. According to the Strugatskys, the world of the future is inhabited by thinking people, brought up in respect for rational knowledge obtained by scientific methods. When Boris Strugatsky participated in geodetic and archaeological expeditions in the Caucasus and Central Asia, he repeatedly wrote to his brother about the catastrophic illiteracy of the young post-war generation: "It turned out that the titanic machine of the general education process, and even more so the machine of radio-newspaper-television propaganda — spun over their heads in vain?"

From the very beginning the Strugatskys proceeded from the psychology of the best part of Soviet people of the 1950s–1960s, this position as a principled one the co-author brothers expressed at the 1964 meeting of science fiction writers in the report The Man of Our Dream. The Strugatskys stated that already in our time there is a shift of the "pole of talent, genius" ("as now what was at the pole of genius 200 years ago is the norm") and therefore in two hundred or three hundred years most people will become such as now seem exceptional. The authors interpreted the future not as a result of random development of events, but as a fusion of two main trends: as the result of all previous ascending development of humanity and at the same time as the result of conscious influence of people. The transition to a knowledge society is possible only through targeted efforts in upbringing, the project of the system of which is characterized in the novella Malefactors. The students of the fantastic Anyudin boarding school have great freedom in choosing activities and prefer to spend leisure on studying the latest physical theories and chemical experiments, active games or scuba diving. Learning occurs through dialogue with the mentor (Teacher), but "television lessons" on economics and geography are mentioned. Algebra is studied together with the teacher. The Teacher is the highest authority, who must act as a specialist in all disciplines, but first of all he is engaged in the moral-ethical upbringing of children. According to Yu. Chernyakhovskaya, this refers to the pedagogical theories of utopians Ch. Fourier and R. Owen: theoretical training is combined with applied in training workshops. The Teacher deals with a small number of adolescents, whose life and morals he knows thoroughly, he is aware of how each of them spends free time and what habits they have. That is, he combines the functions of educator and psychologist. The Teacher has access to the students' room at any time of day, but rarely uses it, guidance is mainly carried out indirectly. Almost always the Teacher enjoys the love and respect of the students, lying to him is considered the gravest offense ("Lying to the teacher, you'll lie to anyone"; "All the worst in a person begins with a lie").

In the same novel, the life and structure of the Higher School of Cosmogation is characterized (novella Almost the Same). It includes four faculties: command, navigation, engineering, remote control. In the school for young people, education is joint, the program includes sports activities and endurance training, work with the waveguide computer LIANTO (analogous to modern informatics classes). Each stream of cadets has its own head, responsible to the faculty chief for discipline. Like the Anyudin boarding school, the building of the Higher School of Cosmogation is surrounded by a spacious park, in which cadets spend free time, they also eat together. According to the Strugatskys, as such socialization progresses, the probability of the appearance of individuals consciously striving to commit a crime against the person sharply decreases.

The goal of the High Theory of Upbringing is to create a human personality for which the main need and pleasure is creative labor. In the formulation of B. N. Strugatsky himself, the main task of the teacher is to discover and develop the child's main talent while simultaneously interrupting the transmission of parents' negative life experience to future generations of children. This is the main argumentation in favor of entrusting upbringing to professionals, not biological parents. Such a system is based on the principle of subject-subject interaction according to the scheme "teacher—student", while, unlike I. A. Efremov, labor activity does not play a big role in the system built by the Strugatskys. The Strugatskys did not try to solve (or even describe) the problem of where a large number of teachers will come from for the universal formation of the humanity of the future with practically individual education. In this regard, the High Theory of Upbringing remained unfinished.

== Goals, tasks, results ==
=== The Strugatskys' philosophical anthropology ===
Candidate of Philosophical Sciences R. Yu. Fofanov connected the genesis of the High Theory of Upbringing with the general theme of social-philosophical science fiction of I. A. Efremov, namely the theme of the possibility of the appearance of a "disalienated person" (that is, the maximum humanization of a person as a biological being). This theme in the 1960s and later was multifaceted in the artistic work of the Strugatskys. The Strugatskys also engaged in philosophical reflection on this problem. At the 1962 international meeting in the editorial office of the magazine Tekhnika Molodezhi the co-authors presented the report Man and Society of the Future, expressing, according to R. Yu. Fofanov and philosopher N. V. Korotkov, the "pre-progressor" stage of the Strugatskys' thinking. In this report, the Strugatskys stated that in the second half of the 20th century, for the first time in all human history, scientific-technical and production conditions appeared for satisfying the material needs of all humanity. Complete abundance is artificially restrained, mainly due to the historically rooted unfair distribution. Injustice is expressed in the fact that the presence of benefits in one part of human society causes hostility in another part of the same society. However, material abundance alone is completely insufficient for creating the person of the future. According to the Strugatskys' conviction, a person by nature is a being that lives to think and cognize.

In the 1962 report, the Strugatskys put purely literary tasks in the foreground: from their point of view, scientific-technical science fiction is outdated, since fantasizing on the theme of organizational-technical achievements of the future gives the possibility of outlining no more than the background of the action of a literary text. Since the creation of images of the main characters is at the center of writers' tasks, the Strugatskys highlighted two extremes to which authors creating images of people of the future gravitate. Firstly, the author risks leveling the significance of a person against the background of powerful technology. Secondly, — to turn a person into a scheme. The latter, according to R. Yu. Fofanov, was a hint at the characters of I. A. Efremov's utopia Andromeda Nebula. In polemic with the concept of communist future created by Efremov, the Strugatskys themselves worked, forming their own ideas about anthropology of the near future. N. V. Korotkov asserted that I. A. Efremov set the task of depicting "adult" (in the Kantian sense) humanity, which by conscious efforts, in the multi-century dominance of communist society, eradicated psychological traits of the past, including infantilism. The esotericism of the spiritual issues considered by Efremov most irritated critics, causing accusations of schematism, including from the Strugatskys. The co-authors themselves were interested in questions about the driving forces of the development of a communist person, devoid of petit bourgeois instincts. If animal existence is subordinated to the satisfaction of three basic instincts: procreation, self-preservation and food search, then human psyche is determined by disinterested striving for cognition. Before the advent of socialist and communist society, this ability was suppressed by heavy living conditions and social disorder. It is the liberation of humanity for cognition that is the basis for progress in the future. According to R. Yu. Fofanov, the Strugatskys in this were half a century ahead of F. Fukuyama, who in the 2000s revised the concept of the end of history and stated that the end of history will not come until the end of scientific-technical progress, since at the basis of progress is disinterested striving for cognition.

The Strugatskys actively defended the postulate of the key significance of spiritual stimuli in the development of humanity that has overcome material need. According to the Strugatskys (these theses they actively defended even at the end of the 1980s), spiritual objects are more diverse than material aspirations, and therefore "spiritual hunger" will never be threatened by satiety, since the satisfaction of spiritual needs "even more ignites and deepens the appetite". It is the striving of each person for development and the creation by society of conditions for development that are the main factors protecting civilization from stagnation and making progressive accelerated development possible. That is, creative labor in the Noon utopia performs a universal role. Creative labor itself is the goal both of society and of each individual person. Freedom in this context (as Boris Strugatsky recognized in the 21st century) is significant only to the extent that it creates conditions for creativity. Labor is considered expansively: not as a condition for obtaining daily bread and means of consumption, but as a condition and means of realizing human abilities. Labor is the foundation of the development in a person of the need for self-development and cognition. In this context, social development is self-significant, for labor is a condition of access to more interesting types of labor, and the goal of labor is the creation of even more fascinating opportunities for development and application of each person's abilities and even more fascinating labor. Labor itself acts as a process of cognition, for a person is engaged exclusively in such types of activity where new solutions and discoveries are expected and required. That is, this is no longer the erasure of differences between physical and mental labor (as in the classics of Marxism), but the disappearance of the difference between production and scientific-cognitive activity. Labor becomes a form of direct existence of personality and society, working time — this is the sphere of true freedom and the most interesting form of leisure. Labor is any meaningful and creative constructive activity: from the activity of a scientist and artist to the labor of a mother in raising a child. However, the Strugatskys did not deny that a person is capable of receiving pleasure and joy of life not only from labor, but in their understanding joy from labor is the highest.

=== Evolution of the Strugatskys' views on teaching ===
The real historical experience of the second half of the 20th century and the first decades of the 21st century showed that the striving for cognition (whether of a researcher-person or a labor-person) is formed by the education system, and the craving for creation is the result of targeted human efforts. Material values can also correspond to the signs highlighted in the 1960s by the Strugatskys as specific to spiritual values (diversity and impossibility of saturation). In the same years, the philosopher-Freudo-Marxist Herbert Marcuse in the treatise One-Dimensional Man (1967) described the effectiveness of social control based on the artificial formation of new and new primary needs (in the terminology of A. Maslow), which allows keeping a person at the base of Maslow's pyramid, and neither the need for creative labor nor for creative activity arises. The Strugatskys, probably, very quickly came to the same conclusions, which led to the growth of dystopian motifs in their utopian modeling, when in the novella Far Rainbow (1964) the heroes in conditions of technogenic catastrophe are forced to choose between the worst and the worst decisions. In this same novella, the images of those people of the Noon World who do not belong to the elite and are not capable of living creatively were first introduced. According to the Strugatskys, in the world of communism, the creative elite (in the modern sense of the word) included the absolute majority, and the minority consisted of "only poor fellows with 'non-standard' talents — brilliant stone tip sharpeners for spears, stunning expert executioners and masters of torture", as well as persons ideally adapted to tasks and processes that will be discovered and launched only in the following centuries.

The consistent development of the issues of upbringing future generations by the Strugatskys was presented in the novella The Ugly Swans (1967). In this text, the authors for the first time openly declared the impossibility of transforming humanity for the better by existing pedagogical means. One of the most important for the plot is the motif of the mass escape of children from parents and the old world, which not only became hateful to them, but also seems a source of mortal threat. The "wet ones"—emissaries of the frightening future—appeared in the world to rid it of filth and themselves by alienating the young generation from their parents. In the scene of communication of the main hero-writer with the wunderkinds, the humiliated representative of the older generation for the first time is frightened by the thought of the coming new times, the thought that "the future coldly and mercilessly penetrated into the very heart of the present and it is indifferent to all the merits of the past—regardless of whether they were considered true or imaginary". In essence, the difference between the wunderkinds raised by the "wet ones" and their parents is comparable to the difference between a monkey and a human, but at the same time it was impossible to remove the unity of the earthly origin of these species. It is no coincidence that in the next novella —The Kid (1970)— this problem was cut like a Gordian knot. According to critic I. Vasuchenko, in the 1960s the Strugatskys failed to convincingly reason about the theory of upbringing (they did not use this term either): "As natural as their (the Strugatskys' heroes) everyday speech is, so dull and pompous are the abstract reasonings, as if taken from a newspaper article on moral themes". According to the critic, this is a symptom that the Strugatskys' characters are people of action, and the area of moralizing is alien to them. Morality is not for them the great law of being, but just a set of truisms that can be neglected as soon as "the interests of the big cause" command:

Disdain for a person if he is not a fighter on the front lines—that's what bothers me in the Strugatskys' books.

The only work by the Strugatskys entirely dedicated to the purpose and complexity of the teacher's tasks was their last novel Burdened with Evil (1988). Its content demonstrates the tragic paradox to which the authors came: one Teacher with a capital letter is not able by the force of his knowledge and conviction alone to direct society to progress and protect his achievements from distortion in the future, but he also cannot not try to do it. The Strugatskys also became disillusioned with the idea of renouncing private property and consumption as a necessary condition for creating the person of the future. This followed directly from their method of utopian modeling, when the basis was a person of our days with his emotions and shortcomings, but endowed with the energy of creative labor. In the Strugatskys' late works of the 1980s (also Beetle in the Anthill and Waves Extinguish the Wind) a fundamental opposition of the concepts of progressorism and teaching is introduced. According to R. Yu. Fofanov, many opponents of the Strugatskys tried to replace the existence of the High Theory of Upbringing in the Strugatskys' fantastic world with negatively perceived progressorism (purposeful structural change of society by efforts of closed groups using a special "esoteric" language inaccessible to most people). The Strugatskys never abandoned the social and anthropological ideal they once formulated, without abandoning the concept of education as a subject-subject process. In the last novel by S. Vititsky (B. Strugatsky) Powerless of This World, published in 2003, the fundamental thesis is proved: "By no efforts and even super-efforts of no people and even super-people the course of history cannot be changed". Social progress is hindered by human nature itself, the Noon World "is unreal now and will be unreal until we learn to do something with the monkey sitting inside each of us: put it to sleep or somehow deceive, or conjure, or distract".

== Criticism ==
School themes in the Strugatskys' literary world evoke many negative emotions from 21st-century readers. Writer Natalya Mamayeva asserted that the novella Malefactors of the novel Noon: 22nd Century irritates the modern reader also because it is alien in the artistic fabric of the Strugatskys' utopia. The system of boarding schools itself was actively implemented in the Soviet Union of the 1950s and showed its success, for example, in England. The critic's doubts are caused by the fact that the schoolchildren from Anyudin clearly come from prosperous families, they have parents, but throughout the action none of them remembers parents. "Their world of communication is the world of peers, older and younger comrades, well, and, of course, the authority for them is the Teacher". Critics of the Strugatskys' work in the 1960s caught the trend that the Strugatsky writers are not interested in the personal life of their heroes, and the heroes, in turn, are not interested in their own personal life, but only in work. This directly follows from the upbringing system: "The Teacher is a god for children and from the heights of his divinity controls them like chess pieces". At the same time, instead of a volitional prohibition, the pedagogue risks his health to prevent children from escaping from the boarding school. Teacher Tenin, to gain time, skillfully pitted the teenagers against each other, showing the idyllic world of utopia from the wrong side. In these scenes, the negativism of the utopia that rejected Christian morality manifests: "People love neither each other nor themselves".

Science fiction writer Karen Nalbandyan wrote about the same, analyzing the story of schoolchildren from room 18 of the Anyudin boarding school. The Teacher, who made a major mistake—not noticing until the last minute the students' preparations for escape—instead of "looking for some other ways—goes along the line of least resistance". To gain time and save his students from shame, Tenin resorts to direct denunciation. The analysis of the situation ends with two rhetorical questions: "How ethical is all this? Would you give your child to such a teacher?" Consistent polemic with the Noon World and the High Theory of Upbringing was carried out by science fiction writer Sergei Lukyanenko. As an exemplary example, E. Yu. Ioffe (Petrozavodsk State University) cited the novel Stars Are Cold Toys, part of the dilogy "Star Shadow". Lukyanenko himself in one of the interviews directly characterized the upbringing system described by him in the world of Geometers as a conscious polemic with the Strugatskys. Most often Lukyanenko turned to the images of boarding schools and children's games from Noon... and Hard to Be a God. During the dispute with the rebel poet Nikki, mentor Per reminds him that surveillance of children will not allow "juvenile rascals to escape from the boarding school to the spaceport"—this directly refers to the novella Malefactors from the novella Noon: 22nd Century. Nik Rimer — Pyotr Khromov, who returned to his native planet of Geometers, was compared by some reviewers to Lev Abalkin from the novella Beetle in the Anthill. The poems written by Abalkin in childhood and by Nikki are similar.

Journalist Roman Maslennikov analyzed the direct inversion of the Noon World undertaken by S. Lukyanenko, in which the powerful Geometers created a mechanism of "regressorism", directly opposed to the progressorism of the Strugatskys' communist Earth. Lukyanenko's Geometers insist on the only "correct" path of civilization development, to which they accustom other intelligent races, calling it the mission of Friendship. R. Maslennikov proposed the following formula for this: "If you agree—we will progress you. If you don't agree—we will crush you and progress you anyway". According to the critic, "this is a rather typical approach for any culture whose basis is not the family, but the institute of Mentors". Lukyanenko proposed a "merciless and sober" analysis of the Strugatskys' utopia from the outside. Boris Strugatsky, commenting on the first novel of Lukyanenko's dilogy, designated it as a "witty attempt" to show a society in which "the world according to the Strugatskys' blueprints" would be built by Anton Makarenko. Makarenko raised soldiers, fighters for the revolution and in this plan is closer to Gepard from the novella Guy from the Underworld than to the noon Teachers. In E. A. Velikanova's dissertation dedicated to the work of V. Krapivin, aspects of the Strugatskys' High Theory of Upbringing are also considered. Vladislav Krapivin with all his work affirmed the value of the family and the impossibility of replacing native mother and father. However, the writers' positions were united by doubt in the right to exist of the "adult world that has lost the trust of its own children"; the Noon World significantly influenced the image of the universe of the Great Crystal. However, the divergence is fundamental: the Strugatskys sincerely believed that "the most terrible thing for a child is loving parents", while in Krapivin the idea that upbringing should be carried out by professionals in special institutions "did not evoke sympathy". The writer once even argued about this with A. N. Strugatsky. Krapivin's direct polemic with the High Theory of Upbringing is contained in the novella Outpost on Anchor Field, up to allusive situations and terminology ("Informatorium", "tetratissue" instead of "tetraethylene" etc.). According to E. Velikanova, "what in the Strugatskys' world was a blessing, in Krapivin's world turns into evil". The Noon World in the perception of Krapivin's heroes is full of deceit and violence, stemming primarily from the absence of family ties.

Professional educators drew attention to the serious traumatic nature for the personality of the boarding school experience proposed by the Strugatskys. Hothouse conditions for the growing generation are not provided, every human being goes through "stress and overcoming". Dmitry Bykov in this context noted that "every class of an innovative pedagogue is built as a sect, the foundation of which is the thesis of the sinfulness of the rest of the world", which devalues the positive features of such experience "self-intoxication, close and warm friendship of the chosen, contemptuous hostility to the rest of the world". At the same time, according to D. Bykov's remark, the initial thesis of the Strugatskys' pedagogy is the necessity of a serious social upheaval, even war, for forging "real people". All the Strugatskys' heroes are strong people with extreme experience, and "the most terrible contradiction of the artistic Universe of the Strugatskys is that good people... are formed only by war; that war is the main occupation of these good people; that there is nowhere else to take them from".
