= The Kid from Hell =

1973 novel by Arkady and Boris Strugatsky

- Author: Arkady and Boris Strugatsky
- Original title: Парень из преисподней
- Translator: Roger DeGaris
- Language: Russian
- Series: Noon Universe
- Genre: Science fiction novel
- Publisher: Macmillan
- Publication date: 1973
- Publication place: Soviet Union
- English publication date: May 14, 1982
- Media type: Print (Hardcover)
- Preceded by: Space Mowgli
- Followed by: Beetle in the Anthill

The Kid from Hell (Russian: Парень из преисподней, romanized: Paren' iz preispodney) is a 1973 science fiction novel by Russian writers Arkady and Boris Strugatsky, set in the Noon Universe. The English translation was included in a single volume entitled Escape Attempt with the other Noon universe stories Escape Attempt and Space Mowgli.

== Plot summary ==
The novel tells the story of Gack, a teenage boy from Giganda. Gack is a cadet commando in Fighting Cats, an elite army unit of the Alai Duchy. In the first chapter of the novel, Gack is mortally wounded in a dogfight with an attacking tank unit of the army of the Empire. Kornei Yashmaa, a progressor, finds him and takes him to Earth where doctors practically resurrect Gack. Yashmaa tries to help Gack adjust to life on Earth.

However, Gack does not want to cooperate, nor does he believe that Earth is real. At first, he thinks that everything Yashmaa and other Earthlings tell him is a part of his psychological training as an officer of the Alai Army. Even after Yashmaa proves to him that he is, indeed, on a different planet Gack still thinks that the Alai military has sent him to Earth on an unknown secret mission.

His next idea is that the Earth wants to use him as a test subject or a future propaganda agent in an attempt to conquer Giganda. He becomes more and more confused as he learns more about the technology and lifestyle on Earth (he is even given an android servant). Accidentally, Gack discovers that other Gigandians have been taken to Earth as well, but they have integrated into the society and do not want to deal with him.

A month after Gack's arrival on Earth Yashmaa tells him that progressors stopped the war on Giganda and that the Alai Duchy and the Empire are no more. The news shocks Gack so much that he demands to return to Giganda immediately. When Yashmaa refuses, Gack tries to escape by force. With the help of his android servant, he manages to construct an assault rifle and ammunition. Gack threatens to shoot Yashmaa if he does not return him. Though Yashmaa can easily disarm Gack, he is persuaded by Gack's actions and lets him go.

In the last chapter, Gack is back on Giganda and helps local doctors cure a plague ravaging a nearby city. He is home.

== Sources ==
- Strugatsky, Arkady; Boris Strugatsky (May 14, 1982). Roger DeGaris (trans.) (ed.). Escape Attempt (Best of Soviet Science Fiction). New York: Macmillan Pub Co. p. 321 pp. ISBN 0-02-615250-9.
