= Antonina Bouis =

German literary translator

Antonina W. Bouis is a literary translator from Russian to English. She has been called "the best literary translator from Russian" by Publishers Weekly.

== Life ==
Born in West Germany, Bouis was educated in the United States. She has degrees from Barnard College and Columbia University.

== Translations ==
- Roadside Picnic by Arkady and Boris Strugatsky. New York: Macmillan Publishing Co, 1977.
- Mahomet, Mahmed, Mamish by Chinghiz Gusseinov. New York: Macmillan, 1978.
- Nocturne [Travels of the Dilettantes] by Bulat Okudzhava. New York: Harper & Row, 1978.
- Definitely Maybe by Arkady and Boris Strugatsky. New York: Macmillan Publishing Co, 1978.
- Testimony [The Memoirs of Dmitri Shostakovich] by Solomon Volkov. New York: Harper & Row, 1979.
- Professor Dowell's Head by Alexander Belyaev. New York: Macmillan Publishing Co., 1980.
- Beetle in the Anthill by Arkady and Boris Strugatsky. New York: Macmillan Publishing Co., 1980.
- Space Apprentice by Arkady and Boris Strugatsky. New York: Macmillan Publishing Co., 1981.
- Wild Berries by Yevgeny Yevtushenko. New York: William Morrow & Co, 1984.
- (tr. with Albert Todd and Yevgeny Yevtushenko) Almost at the end by Yevgeny Yevtushenko. New York: H. Holt, 1987.
- Danilov, the Violist by Vladimir Orlov. William Morrow and Co, 1987.
- The Time Wanderers by Arkady and Boris Strugatsky. New York: Richardson & Steirman, 1987.
- Forever Nineteen by Grigory Baklanov. New York: J.B. Lippincott, 1989.
- The Suitcase by Sergei Dovlatov. New York: Grove Weidenfeld, 1990.
- Moscow and beyond, 1986-1989 by Andrei Sakharov. New York: Knopf, 1991.
- Fatal half measures : the culture of democracy in the Soviet Union by Yevgeny Yevtushenko. Boston: Little, Brown and Co., 1991.
- Fear by Anatoli Rybakov. Boston: Little, Brown, 1992.
- Don't Die Before You're Dead by Yevgeny Yevtushenko. New York: Random House, 1995.
- Dust and Ashes by Anatoli Rybakov. Boston: Little, Brown, 1996.
- A letter for Daria by Ekaterina Gordeeva. Boston: Little, Brown, 1998.
- Voices from Chernobyl: The Oral History of a Nuclear Disaster by Svetlana Alexievich. London: Aurum Press, 1999.
- The world of Andrei Sakharov: a Russian physicist's path to freedom by Gennady Gorelik. Oxford, New York: Oxford University Press, 2004.
- Shostakovich and Stalin : the extraordinary relationship between the great composer and the brutal dictator by Solomon Volkov. New York: Knopf, 2004.
- Collapse of an Empire: Lessons for Modern Russia by Yegor Gaidar. Washington, D.C.: Brookings Institution Press, 2007.
- Alexander II : The Last Great Tsar by Edvard Radzinsky. New York: Free Press, 2005.
- Woman with a Movie Camera: My Life as a Russian Filmmaker by Marina Goldovskaya. Austin: University of Texas Press, 2006.
- (tr. with Jamey Gambrell) White walls: collected stories by Tatyana Tolstaya. New York: New York Review Books, 2007.
- The magical chorus: a history of Russian culture from Tolstoy to Solzhenitsyn by Solomon Volkov. New York : Alfred A. Knopf, 2008.
- A Dog's Heart by Mikhail Bulgakov. Oneworld Classics Ltd., 2011.
- Romanov riches : Russian writers and artists under the tsars by Solomon Volkov. New York: Knopf, 2011.
- Russia: A Long View by Yegor Gaidar. Cambridge: MIT Press, 2012.
- Oblivion by Sergei Lebedev. New Vessel Press, 2016.
- The Year of the Comet by Sergei Lebedev. New Vessel Press, 2017.
- The Goose Fritz by Sergei Lebedev. New Vessel Press, 2019.
- Untraceable by Sergei Lebedev. New Vessel Press, 2021.
- A Present Past: Titan and Other Chronicles by Sergei Lebedev. New Vessel Press, 2023.
- The Lady of the Mine by Sergei Lebedev. New Vessel Press, 2025.
