= Disquiet (Strugatsky novel) =

1965 novel by Boris and Arkady Strugatsky

Disquiet (Russian: Беспокойство, romanized: Bespokoystvo) is a 1965 science fiction novel by Soviet-Russian writers Boris and Arkady Strugatsky, set in the Noon Universe. It is the initial variant of the novel Snail on the Slope (Улитка на склоне) which has a different set of characters and is not set in the Noon Universe. After completing the first draft, the authors felt a need to take the novel in a different direction, which resulted in the creation of Snail on the Slope. However, twenty-five years later, they examined the initial draft and concluded that it was a decent novel in its own right. In 1990, it was published in «Измерение-Ф» [Dimension F] magazine. In 1995, feeling the need to expose it to a wider readership, Boris Strugastky published it online (but it has been taken offline by his heirs).

== Plot summary ==
The novel is set on the planet Pandora which is famous for its animated biosphere. Humans have built a base on it that serves as a biological laboratory and a hunting resort. The base is located at the top of 2 km high crag on a continent otherwise covered by forest. Biologists do not understand most of the processes occurring in the forest. Humans hunt in the forest for sport in the face of serious dangers.

The novel is divided into two parts: life in the base and life in the forest. The director of the base is Paul Gnedykh. He is responsible for overall safety, supply, and communication with the Earth. He replaced the previous director after several deaths occurred on the base. One of the deaths was the biologist Mikhail "Athos" Sidorov, Gnedykh's childhood friend. Some biologists claimed they saw people in the forest, but nobody took them seriously (partially because such visions were seen when the bioblocade of the observer was weakened or expired). The forest is rapidly changing, such that maps completely obsolete in two years. Some trees move from place to place, while others show signs of feeling the "pain" of other trees. Leonid Gorbovsky stays on Pandora believing that the forest is dangerous. He wants to be near when the forest "starts acting" to be able to influence the process. Gorbovsky is upset because the base staff are being negligent about the forest, not taking the forest seriously enough.

One day a female hunter and gamekeeper becomes stranded in the forest and calls Paul Gnedykh for help. She calls from the same forest sector where Athos sent his last bearing signal. When Gnedykh and Gorbovsky arrive at the site, they see a mysterious organism that caused the helicopter crash. The organism is attracting trees and animals and eating them. It gives birth to several "children" every 87 minutes. The children are amorphous white creatures that move by means of pseudopods. The children first move from the parent uniformly in one direction. Gnedykh and Gorbovsky follow the children until they reach a lake and drown themselves. While observing the lake, Paul thinks he sees a human in the water, and records a video of the scene.

In the forest segment of the novel, Athos attempts to return to the base after living in a village in the middle of the forest. The villagers are in foggy states of mind but have abilities to "grow" themselves food, clothes, and houses; and control the flora around them. Athos was brought to the village seriously ill by Hurt-Martyr and Broken Leg—two village natives—and given a wife named Nava. Athos too has troubles with his memory. He encourages two villagers, Fist and Broken Leg, to make a trip to The City, a mysterious place, where Athos hopes to get information about how to return. Hurt-Martyr went to The City before, but never returned. The tribe tries to talk Athos out of his journey, citing the rumored Dead Ones walking around in the forest. Slightly before the planned trip, he goes on reconnaissance, and Nava follows him. They are attacked by a group of bandits, and after a brief fight they escape. They end up in another unfamiliar village where Athos meets people he recognizes as Karl and Valentine, other biologists from the base. He is unable to talk to them, as some uncontrollable fear compels him and Nava to run away from the village, now engulfed in violet fog.

When Nava wakes up the next morning she finds a scalpel in her hand. She is afraid of it, and Athos hides it in his clothing. Athos wants to return to the unfamiliar village, but when they do, they find it sinking into the water, the process referred to as Overcoming. After the trip to the sinking village, they meet three women, one of whom is Nava's mother who was captured by the Dead Ones before. Athos and Nava realize that the Dead Ones who capture women from the villages are actually droids that serve women who live in The City. These women (calling themselves Glorious Helpmates) consider men (and many other biological species) as useless, a "mistake", since the woman are able to breed non-sexually without men. These women profess control over "little ones", and control the violet fog, which is made up of bacteria that can be used for diverse purposes including communication and assassination. The Glorious Helpmates are participating in a battle with unspecified enemy. The front of this battle separates Athos from the base. The front is allegedly so biologically active that any living creature (even the Glorious Helpmates, who are protected) are likely to die there. The women take Nava from Athos. During the conversation he remembers several important experiences.

Athos is attacked by a Dead droid, which he kills with his scalpel and flees. He returns to his village, where he again encourages Fist and Broken Leg who unite and travel to the base at Devils Crag. Athos now understands that the villages will disappear because of Overcoming (the process led by the Glorious Helpmates) and wants to prevent this mass murder. Broken Leg does not want Athos to go since he believes Athos will die. In the entire section of the novel, there is almost not a single object in the forest that is not a mutable living thing. One can grow clothing from the forest, eat the ground itself as a meal, and so on.

The origin of people in the forest is unknown.

== Relationship with other works ==
The forest part of Disquiet is almost identical to the one of Snail on the Slope, but their base parts are totally different, the base of Snail representative of some Kafkian bureaucratic civilization (allusive of the post-Stalinist Soviets), instead of the utopian culture of Disquiet. Athos and Gorbovsky are substitutes of Kandid and Perez from Snail on the Slope.

Mikhail "Athos" Sidorov also appears in the chapters "The Conspirators" and "The Assaultmen" of Noon: 22nd Century as a schoolkid and a biologist; in Space Mowgli as the Ark Project head; in the chapter "Defeat" of Noon: 22nd Century (that appears not in all variants of the text) as a head of small mechanical embryo testing group; in The Time Wanderers as a president of "Ural-North" sector of COMCON-2. The last two listed appearances certainly happen after his life in the forest at Pandora.

There is also a point of view that Disquiet is a fictional work within the Noon Universe rather than the full-fledged part of Noon Universe canon.

There are some striking similarities between the 2009 James Cameron's film Avatar and the "forest" part of the novel, as attested by Boris Strugatsky himself.
