= Progressorship =

Science fiction trope

In science fiction, progressorship is the clandestine activities of a more advanced civilization (or individual persons of it) aimed at the acceleration of progress of a less advanced civilization. Persons who do this are called progressors. The term and the concept (Russian: прогрессорство, прогрессор) were introduced by Soviet science fiction writers Arkady and Boris Strugatsky.

== Origins ==
Konstantin Šindelář, a Czech translator of the Strugatsky brothers' works and the biographer of the Strugatsky brothers Ant Skalandis consider the concept of progressorship to be a major innovation in social science fiction by Strugatckis. Progressorship is a considerable element in the novels from Strugatski's Noon Universe associated with Maxim Kammerer. The term was first introduced in Beetle in the Anthill and further elaborated in The Waves Extinguish the Wind. However, literary critics note that the idea itself can be traced to Strugatsky's 1962 novel Escape Attempt and some later novels, notably Hard to Be a God.

== Controversies of the concept ==
Russian philosopher and politologist Boris Meshuev compared the concept with "export of the revolution". He also argued that in fact, Strugatskis considered the idea of external acceleration with pessimism. He noted that this was noticed by Communist literary critics. They chastised Strugatskis for the novel Escape Attempt, in which, as the critics wrote, the communist Earthlings when confronted with fascism on an alien planet turned out to be powerless and unwilling to interfere.

In the novel Prisoners of Power Strugatskis describe two opposite types of progressors, an accidental one, Maksim Kammerer in his youth days, who crash-landed on planet Saraksh and eventually had become involved in a revolutionary activities against the tyranninic regime. Kammerer botched the plans of a professional progressor, who clandestinely and slowly worked on gradual reforming of Saraksh. The inherent contradiction of progressorship is expressed in a comment of a local wise man: "Your mind, clouded and stunned by conscience, has lost the ability to distinguish the real good of the masses from the imaginary, dictated by your conscience. <…> You will say that in the world from which you came, people cannot live with an unclean conscience. Well, stop living".

In The Waves Extinguish the Wind Toivo Glumov laments: "I was a progressor for only three years, I brought good, only good, nothing but good, and, Lord, how they hated me, these people! And they were within their rights. Because the gods came without asking permission. No one called them, but they barged in and began to do good. The same good that is always good. And they did it secretly, because they knew in advance that mortals would not understand their goals, and if they did, they would not accept them…"

Isay Davydov, in his trilogy I Will Return in a Thousand Years, portrayed an optimistic outcome of progressorship.

== See also ==
- Popadantsy
- Civilizing mission
