= Inhabited Island: The Earthling =

2007 video game

- Developer: Step Creative Group
- Publisher: Akella
- Director: Ilya Chudakov
- Platform: Microsoft Windows
- Release: 2007
- Genre: Adventure
- Mode: Single-player

Inhabited Island: The Earthling (Обитаемый Остров: Землянин) is a 2007 Russian adventure video game based on the 1969 novel Prisoner of Power by Arkady and Boris Strugatsky. It was developed by Step Creative Group and published by Akella.

== Plot and gameplay ==
The plot sees an Earthling from the 22nd century travel to another planet where he becomes involved in the local socio-political environment.

the gameplay is similar to that of the 1993 game Myst, where players navigate through a series of static screens from a first-person perspective. Most of the puzzles are inventory puzzles.

== Development ==
Step Creative Group was founded in 1995 and produced Star Heritage for the ZX Spectrum, then closed down due to the advent of PCs. In 2003 the company was revived and released a few titles in the arcade and adventure genres before decided to produce a remake of the game entitled Star Heritage 1: The Black Cobra before developing Inhabited Island, led by project developer Ilya Chudakov . The developers felt it was important to stay as faithful as the possible to the original source material due to Strugatsky''s novels being considered sacred by Russian book-lovers. Two previous games had been released based on the same novel, Galactic Assault: Prisoner of Power and Inhabited Island: Prisoner of Power. The game engine was comparable to Myst IV; meanwhile the developers created a website where players could read the latest news and communicate with the community. To commence the game, Akella acquired the rights to publish computer games to all of Strugatsky brothers' works.

The game was announced on June 14, 2005 and originally scheduled to be released for the third quarter of 2006. By October 18, 2006 the released had been moved to the first quarter of 2007. The game eventually went gold on December 6 or 8th, 2007. On September 13, 2007, Chudakov said the company was open to a sequel based on the success of the first game. An English port was worked on in 2008, but in March Step Creative closed its doors again and Akella aimed to complete the localisation. The developers did not plan on showing the game to the Strugatsky brothers as they assumed they had no interest in games.

== Critical reception ==
Igromania criticised the "obscene graphics" and "primitive gameplay". Stop Game felt the game came across as a mediocre budget title. Ferra felt the game had the potential to have become a great local game, but fell short of that ambition.
