= Inhabited Island =

Inhabited Island may refer to:

- Prisoners of Power (or Inhabited Island), a science fiction novel by Arkady and Boris Strugatsky
- Dark Planet (2008 film), a science fiction film directed by Fyodor Bondarchuk based on the novel
