= Psycho Moto Zine =

American periodical

Psycho Moto Zine is a periodical published from the late 1980s to the present day, consisting mostly of short stories, reviews, and artwork. This fanzine would be the birth of the Antagonist Art Movement, a consortium of like-minded artists, writers, filmmakers, etc.

The magazine was originally published in 1989 under the name East Coast Exchange by Ethan H. Minsker. Copies were produced illicitly by friends who worked in copy shops during Minsker’s college years at School of Visual Arts in New York City and in Washington D.C. during Minsker’s summer breaks.

By 1994 Psycho Moto Zine (PMZ) had transformed into an arts and literary fanzine with reviews that covered underground art, fanzines, films, and music. This connection between different creative elements was the inspiration for what would become the Antagonist Art Movement in 2000.

Psycho Moto continues to this day, with issues being published once or twice a year.
