= Prisoners of Power =

1969 novel by Arkady and Boris Strugatsky

- Author: Arkady and Boris Strugatsky
- Original title: Обитаемый остров
- Translator: Helen Saltz Jacobson
- Language: Russian
- Series: Noon Universe
- Genre: Science fiction
- Publisher: Macmillan
- Publication date: 1971
- Publication place: Soviet Union
- English publication date: 1977
- Media type: Print (Hardcover)
- ISBN: 0-02-615160-X
- Preceded by: Disquiet
- Followed by: Space Mowgli

Prisoners of Power, also known as The Inhabited Island (Russian: Обитаемый остров, romanized: Obitaemyy ostrov, pronounced [ɐbʲɪˈtaɪmɨj ˈostrəf]), is a science-fiction novel written by Soviet authors Arkady and Boris Strugatsky. Written in 1969 and originally published in the same year in the literary magazine Neva (1969, No. 3, 4, and 5, publication of the Leningrad Division of the Union of Soviet Writers), it appeared in book form in 1971 with great number of changes as demanded by the state censor; the English translation was released in 1977. The 1992 Russian edition removed most of the censorship-induced changes, with the exception of a few that the authors, in retrospect, had found useful. The protagonist is a youngster, Maxim Kammerer, who comes from the version of Earth that exists in the Noon Universe and gets stranded on an unknown planet named Saraksh.

== Plot summary ==
Maxim Kammerer is a young amateur space explorer from Earth, regarded as a failure by his friends and relatives because this occupation is not considered to be a serious pursuit. The novel starts when he crash-lands on an unexplored planet Saraksh inhabited by a humanoid race. The atmospheric conditions on Saraksh are such that the inhabitants believe that they live inside a sphere. The level of technological development on the planet is similar to mid-20th century Earth. The planet recently came through big nuclear and conventional war and the predicament of the population is dire. While Maxim is out exploring his surroundings, the natives find and destroy his crashed spaceship, mistaking it for a dangerous automated weapon left over from the war.

At first he doesn't take his situation seriously, imagining himself a Robinson Crusoe stranded on an island inhabited by primitive but friendly natives. He is looking forward to establishing contact and befriending the population of the planet. However, the reality turns out to be far from glamorous. Kammerer's crash site is near a forced labor camp. He is captured by an armed prisoner work detail; the camp's commanding officer takes him for an unusual amnesiac and sends him to a governmental research institute where he is treated as a mental patient. He accidentally escapes and finds himself in the capital of a totalitarian state, perpetually at war with its neighbors. The city is grim and polluted, with police and military omnipresent.

Twice daily everyone is overcome by sudden and unexplained bouts of enthusiasm, proclaiming their allegiance to the country's hidden rulers, known as the Unknown Fathers (in the censored versions Fire-bearing Creators), serving as bulwarks against threats - mainly from the so-called degens, terrorists who sometimes blow up the anti-ballistic missile (ABM) towers strewn around the country.

All this makes little sense to Maxim, since his own society is free from war, hostility, crime and material shortages. Still confused about the official ideology, Kammerer is convinced by a new friend to enlist as a gendarme, to serve and protect the state and its people. He is ordered to execute some captured degens, one of them a woman. When he refuses, he is shot for insubordination and left for dead, but survives, and joins the underground which consists of the degens who suffer debilitating headaches twice daily. Degens believe that radiation from the ABM towers causes their headaches and enforces their status as outsiders.

Maxim participates in a degen terrorist attack which destroys one such tower. Captured, tried and sent to a forced labor camp in the South, the same one where he had made his landing, he finally learns the truth about the towers from a fellow prisoner who is a high-ranking member of the underground. The towers turn out to be broadcasting a mind control signal, employed by the Fathers to control the population.

A constant low-intensity broadcast suppresses most people's critical thinking, making the omnipresent regime propaganda much more effective. In addition, twice a day an intense signal relieves mental stresses caused by the disconnect between the propaganda and the observed reality by inducing euphoria in the susceptible majority, and intense headaches in others who are immune to the signal's coercive power. Those are the only sober-thinking people in the country, including both the underground degens and the Fathers themselves.

Astonished and appalled by this revelation, Kammerer makes it his mission to rid the planet of the mind control broadcast system. Several of his schemes fail because the cure may be worse than the disease. He escapes to the radioactive wasteland in the South in the hopes of raising an invasion force, but the mutants dwelling in the wasteland refuse to join him because any plausible outcome of Kammerer's invasion plan would likely destroy their society. Kammerer's next idea is to use the state's powerful overseas neighbor—the Island Empire—but he abandons that plan after discovering evidence that the Empire's military routinely perpetrates massacres and other atrocities.

He now focuses on trying to find and destroy the Control Center where the mind control broadcasts originate. Meanwhile, the Fathers decide to wage a small victorious war against one of the country's northern neighbors, Honti. Kammerer surrenders to local gendarmes and is assigned to a penal battalion that is supposed to lead the invasion of the North. In this abortive action, many of his friends perish while Kammerer himself, despite his attempt to desert before battle, barely survives a nuclear blast. With the help of an agent working for a powerful Father known as the Wanderer, Kammerer returns to the capital, earns a rehabilitation from the state, and is offered a high-status job in a secret research institute. At the same time, he makes a political career in the underground and advocates for a more effective revolutionary strategy.

A Father known as the Smarty realizes that Kammerer is not affected by the broadcasts in any way and plots to use him to stage a coup and take over the state. His plan is for Kammerer to capture the Control Center and use its transmissions to incapacitate his rivals and install him as the new ruler in the minds of the population. The center is protected by intense depression-inducing local broadcast field that makes it impossible for any native to penetrate it. The Smarty reveals the center's location to Kammerer, who plays along; however, after penetrating the center, Kammerer destroys it instead, thus disabling the whole system countrywide.

It is revealed that the powerful Father, the Wanderer, is in fact a human progressor named Rudolf Sikorski, carefully working in secret to gradually improve the lot of the people of Saraksh. His plans now ruined, the Wanderer finally catches up with Maxim and lambasts him for his interference. He describes the unanticipated consequences of Kammerer's rash actions: up to 20% of the people may go insane due to the withdrawal from the effects of the mind control signal; Saraksh faces an economic crisis, famine, anarchy, widespread radioactive pollution, a shortage of doctors and medical supplies, and a looming invasion of the continent by the Island Empire which the Wanderer had been planning to stop by broadcasting a depression-inducing mind control signal. The Wanderer orders Kammerer to leave the planet but Maxim refuses and stays on, to help stabilize the situation. Despite the many upheavals that Saraksh has ahead of it, he is still glad he destroyed the Control Center because now the people can be in charge of their own destiny.

== Sequels ==
According to Boris Strugatsky's later reminiscences, the Strugatsky brothers were planning to write a sequel to Inhabited Island. However, following the death of Arkady Strugatsky, the surviving brother felt that he could not bring himself to write the novel. The novel would have been named "White Ferz" ("Белый Ферзь"). Ferz - the Russian term for Queen in chess, which has male gender in Russian. The novel would have followed the story of the infiltration of Maxim Kammerer, now a progressor, into the heart of the Island Empire.

Boris Strugatsky wrote:

It was this novel that ABS was thinking about during their last meeting in Moscow in January 1991. I remember very well that our discussion was sluggish, reluctant, without any enthusiasm. It was an anxious and uncomfortable time. Desert Storm was beginning in Iraq, the Alpha group had stormed the TV center in Vilnius, the abscess of the coming coup was preparing to rupture, and the adventures of Maxim Kammerer in the Island Empire did not seem exciting to us at all -- it was strange and even somehow indecent to think up them.

Two other sequels exist, Beetle in the Anthill and The Time Wanderers, but their plots are almost independent from the first book: while they have the common characters, Maxim Kammerer and Rudolf Sikorski, the events of Inhabited Island are only briefly mentioned. The events that authors planned to describe in White Ferz took place at some time between the events of Beetle in the Anthill and The Time Wanderers.

== Adaptations ==
There have been three PC games based on the novel released in 2007: adventure game Inhabited Island: Earthling developed by Step Creative Group, strategy Galactic Assault developed by Wargaming and first-person shooter Inhabited Island: Prisoner of Power by Orion Games.

A two-part Russian movie adaptation, Dark Planet, was released in December 2008 and April 2009.

== English translations ==
The first English translation, by H.S. Jacobson, is based on the censored version of the novel, as the original version was unavailable to the translator.

The second English translation, by Andrew Bromfield, is based on the original version.
