= Noon Universe =

Science fiction setting

The Noon Universe (Russian term: "Мир Полудня" or "Мир Полдня" – "World of Noon"; also known as the “Wanderers’ Universe”) is a fictional future setting for a number of hard science fiction novels written by Arkady and Boris Strugatsky. The universe is named after Noon: 22nd Century, chronologically the first novel from the series and referring to humanity reaching its noon in the 22nd century.

According to Arkady Strugatsky, the brothers at first did not make a conscious effort to create a fictional universe. Rather, they reused characters and settings from prior works whenever they found it convenient. It was only later that they began drawing on common themes and plot threads from various novels to create newer works.

== Description ==
The victory of communism and the advance of technological progress on the Earth of the Noon Universe has resulted in an overabundance of resources and eliminated the need for most types of manual labor.

Mankind is capable of near-instantaneous interstellar travel. Earth's social organization is presumably communist and can be described as a highly technologically advanced anarchistic meritocracy. There is no state structure, no institutionalized coercion, no police etc., yet the society's functioning is safeguarded by raising everyone as responsible individuals, with the guidance of a set of High Councils accepted by everyone in each particular field of activity.

The main governing body is the World Council, which is composed of the brightest scientists, historians, doctors and teachers. Local matters are handled by the regional versions of the council. Planetary councils are present on each Earth colony (such as in Rainbow) as well, but "colony" in this context refers to a planet that was not home to any sentient life before the arrival of Terran settlers. In the Noon Universe, Earth has never attempted to seize permanent control over any other civilization.

There is the COMCON (COMmission for CONtacts) in charge of contacts with aliens and the secret service COMCON-2 for clandestine operations.

=== Sentient races ===
There are a number of sentient races in the Noon Universe. Some of them are humanoid, and others are so alien that humanity did not realise for decades that they were sentient. Several sentient races maintain diplomatic relations with Earth's society. Many planets in the Noon Universe are inhabited by races identical to humans in all but minor genetic differences. It has been speculated that they were humans who wound up on other worlds by the manipulations of the Wanderers (as Beetle in the Anthill shows, that is hardly unprecedented).

The following sentient species are depicted: Ark Megaforms (негуманоиды Ковчега), Garrotian Snails (слизни Гарроты), Golovans (Голованы, sentient dogs), Humans, Ludens (людены, who are superhumans), Leoniders (леонидяне) Tagorians (тагоряне), and Wanderers (Странники, a superrace).

The Wanderers are the most mysterious race in the Noon Universe. Technologically advanced and highly secretive, the Wanderers are suspected of manipulating sentient beings throughout Noon Universe for their own purposes. While those purposes remain unclear, it is hinted that they try to "progress" various sentient beings, including the human race.

=== Progressors ===
One of the controversial occupations in the Noon Universe is that of the progressors, agents embedded in less-advanced humanoid civilizations in order to accelerate their development or to resolve their problems. Progressors' methods range from rescuing local scientists and artists to overthrowing local governments. Konstantin Šindelář, the Czech translator of the Strugatsky brothers' works (among others) and the biographer of the Strugatsky brothers Ant Skalandis consider the phenomenon of "progressorship" to be one of the major concepts introduced into the social science fiction by Strugatskis. Progressorship is a considerable element in the novels Beetle in the Anthill in which the term was first introduced and The Waves Extinguish the Wind, but literary critics agree that the idea, although unnamed, may be found in the 1962 novel Escape Attempt and that a number of subsequent novels, notably Hard to Be a God, deal with progressorship.

COMCON-2 suspected that the Wanderers act as progressors with respect to the Earth and try to counteract them; this is discussed, e.g., in The Waves Extinguish the Wind.

== Works ==
These works by the Strugatsky brothers are set in the Noon Universe (listed chronologically):

- Noon: 22nd Century (Полдень. XXII век, first published 1961)
- Escape Attempt (Попытка к бегству)
- Far Rainbow (Далекая Радуга)
- Hard to Be a God (Трудно быть богом)
- Disquiet (Беспокойство) – the initial variant of the Snail on the Slope (Улитка на склоне)
- Prisoners of Power (The Inhabited Island) (Обитаемый остров)
- Space Mowgli (Малыш)
- The Kid from Hell (Парень из преисподней)
- Beetle in the Anthill (Жук в муравейнике)
- The Time Wanderers (Волны гасят ветер)

There are loose connections to early stories The Land of Crimson Clouds ("Страна багровых туч"), The Way to Amalthea ("Путь на Амальтею"), Space Apprentice ("Стажеры"), The Final Circle of Paradise (through Ivan Zhilin), Ispytanie SKIBR, Chastnye predpolozheniya, mainly through Bykov's family.

In the early 1990s, the Strugatsky brothers began writing what they intended to be a final Noon Universe novel. It would have tied up some of the plot threads that were left unresolved in previous novels. However, after the death of Arkady Strugatsky, the surviving brother, Boris, felt that he could not bring himself to finish the novel. The book would have been named White Ferz ("Белый Ферзь"). "Ferz" or "Vizier" is the Russian masculine term for the queen in chess. The Strugatsky brothers planned the book as a direct sequel of Prisoners of Power following the story of infiltration of the progressor Maxim Kammerer into the elite of the Island Empire.

In the late 1990s, a series of fiction by notable Russian sci-fi writers, titled Time of Apprentices, was published in Russia with an endorsement of Boris Strugatsky. The pieces in the series build upon Strugatsky brothers' ideas and works, and many of them are set in the Noon Universe. In particular, Aleksandr Lukyanov wrote the novel Black Pawn, author's vision of what the novel White Ferz could have been. More various Strugatsky fanfics were published later.

From 1996 to 2015, there was a re-release of all Noon Universe novels as part of the Worlds of Strugatsky Brothers series. This re-release is accompanied with introductory articles written by literary critics from the perspective of Noon Universe historians looking back on the events of the said novels several decades later, as well as with the excerpts of Boris Strugatsky's memoirs Comments on the Past.

== Major personalities ==
- Lev Abalkin (Абалкин, Лев)
- Leonid Gorbovsky (Горбовcкий, Леонид)
- Maxim Kammerer (Каммерер, Максим)
- Gennady Komov (Комов, Геннадий)
- Rudolf Sikorski (Сикорски, Рудольф)
- Maya Glumova (Глумова, Майя)

== Planets ==
- Ark (Ковчег): described in Space Mowgli; a barren world very similar to Earth in all aspects except the biosphere, which is unbelievably poor. For example, the oceans of the planet are empty (no fish, no algae, no mammals) but are quite suitable for protein life. The planet was chosen by progressors as a refuge and a new home for the population of Pant, a planet in danger of a global natural catastrophe. The name was given after the biblical Ark built by Noah. Initial plans were to gradually change the biosphere of Ark to make it more similar to the Pantian one and then to transfer all Pantians to their new home. Considering the low technological advancement level of Pantians, they should not have noticed anything at all. However, the plan was canceled when the non-humanoid native civilization of Ark (Megaforms) was discovered. It is nowhere stated in Strugatsky's books whether the "Ark Project" (started in 2160 AD) was ever completed and how. The local civilization of Ark is nearly as enigmatic as the Wanderers. An official contact with them was never established although the Ark Megaforms employed a human agent to communicate with progressors working on the surface of Ark. The agent was Piere "The Kid" Semyonov, a 13-year-old human whose parents died in 2147 when their spaceship "Pilgrim" was shot down by Wanderers' satellite. Although Megaforms negotiated (through their agent) to drive progressors away from their home world, no further attempt to share technologies or cultural developments was registered.
- Arkanar (Арканар): The capital of the Arkanar kingdom on an unnamed planet, the setting of the novel Hard to Be a God. The society is in the state of a feudal system. In some critical works on Strygatskys the planet is sometimes called Aurora, suggested by critic Sergey Pereslegin. There is a detailed description of Aurora based on the novel and Strugatskys's interviews written by biologist, popular scientist and science fiction writer Sergey Yastrebov.
- Blue sands planet: the planet visited by the spaceship Taimyr, which returned in 2117.
- Earth (Земля).
- Garrota (Гаррота): the home planet of Garrotian snails (слизни Гарроты), a non-humanoid alien race that took humans and their technology for a product of their own imagination. The planet is briefly mentioned in Space Mowgli, and no further information about either the race or the planet is available.
- Giganda (Гиганда): a planet populated by humans, the native planet of the protagonist from The Kid from Hell. For a long time, the two superpowers of the planet, Alai Duchy and the Empire, were drawn into a total war conflict that has been ended only when Earth's progressors started an undercover anti-war activity in 2177 AD. One of the planet's natives, a teenager elite troops cadet of the Alai Duchy was taken to Earth and introduced to its advanced society. Despite repeated efforts to integrate him, he failed to adjust. He then chose to be returned to Giganda. Discovered in 2136 AD.
- Hope (Надежда): described briefly in Beetle in the Anthill, it is another planet populated by humans whose technological advancement is roughly equal to that of Earth in the 20th century. In approximately 2123 AD, a massive ecological catastrophe (probably a man-made one) devastated the planet causing its inhabitants to age at an unnatural pace after the twelfth year of life. Wanderers, apparently believing that a new, clean environment is the cure, have transported most of the population of Hope to an unknown planet using some sort of enhanced interplanetary transport ("null-T"), but few people decided to remain and became a subject of a consequent hunt by Wanderers through a sophisticated system of traps, especially for children. Discovered in 2162 AD.
- Leonida (Леонида): the home planet of Leonidans, a humanoid alien race that lives in a perfect symbiosis with the planet's biosphere. Leonida is located in EN-23 system, its only moon is called Palmyra (Пальмира) and its day-night cycle lasts a bit longer than 27 hours. The planet was apparently the first one with an Earth-like climate suitable for humans' existence. The planet was perhaps named after its discoverer, Leonid Gorbovsky. Discovered in 2133 AD.
- Mars: the solar planet featured in the Noon Universe. Mars has complex forms of indigenous plant and animal life, but none is sentient. It also has many artifacts of an ancient supercivilization, assumed to be remnants of the Wanderers. An abandoned city is at the North Pole, and the moons Phobos and Deimos are discovered to be artificial satellites constructed by the Wanderers.
- Pandora (Пандора): a planetwide holiday resort. It is mostly covered with jungle swarming with dangerous alien fauna (like crayfish-spiders or tahorgs) that young people just love to hunt. Every year dozens of people are killed or seriously injured on Pandora despite countless safety measures by Earth's government. No local sentient species are registered. Pandora is apparently located in a system with two suns. Pandora's skies were a training ground for Goloans, when humans shared the space traveling technologies with them during the "Golovans in Space" project. Discovered before 2119 AD (exact date unknown).
- Panta (Панта): a planet endangered by a global catastrophe, an explosion of its own sun as a part of standard stellar evolution. Unfortunately, there were sentient species identical to humans on the planet and so they had to be deported from it ("Ark Project") to another one. The first choice was Ark, but since the discovery of a sentient alien race there, progressors have apparently changed their mind. Discovered approximately in 2161 AD.
- Rainbow (Радуга): the setting of the novel Far Rainbow.
- Ruzhena (Ружена): an Earth-like planet in VK-71016 system. Valentin Petrov, the leader of the expedition that discovered it, named the planet after his wife, Ruzhena Naskova, but the planet was not really hospitable since two members of the spaceship crew perished on it, and Petrov himself lost an arm. Ruzhena is described in "Частные предположения", a book that has been never translated in English and contains only a vague connection to the Noon Universe.
- Saraksh (Саракш): the setting of the novel Prisoners of Power.
- Saula (Саула): the setting of the novel An Attempt to Escape.
- Tagora (Тагора): the home planet of Tagorians, a lizard-like alien race, the first one that Earth ever contacted. It is mentioned in An Attempt to Escape that there is a human resident (or spy) on Tagora whose name is presumably Benny Durov (Бенни Дуров) and that he is a progressor working under cover to study Tagorian technology. Discovered in the end of 21st century although full-scale contact was established in 2122 AD.
- Tissa (Тисса): a planet in EN-63061 system. It is famous mostly for an incident that happened shortly after a Freelance Search Group (FSG) expedition discovered it. For some reason, the members of the group could not establish a radio connection to any human world or spaceship except for their own mother ship on the orbit of Tissa, and its computers kept telling them that Earth and all other human settlements were destroyed by global catastrophes and that they are the only remaining humans in the universe. After the group was rescued, psychologists decided that was a case of temporary madness or a mass suggestion. Tissa is mentioned only in The Time Wanderers. Discovered in 2193 AD.
- Vladislava (Владислава): the first planet (apart from Mars) on which Wanderers' traces were found (artificial satellites and an abandoned city). Also, the planet is known for its extremely turbulent atmosphere, which was conquered only by famous Leonid Gorbovsky. However, there is some protein life on the planet, although none are sentient. Vladislava is located in EN-17 solar system. Discovered in 2121 AD.
- Yaila (Яйла): an even harsher and more dangerous version of Pandora. Infamous for its monstrous fauna (such as Yaila Dragon, presumably, a reptile with an enormous regeneration potential). Its impenetrable jungle and swamps make it considered by many to be just another planet-wide resort, but only the toughest and most experienced hunters generally dare to visit Yaila.

== Reception, analysis, and influence ==
The setting is a future utopia that gets gradually deconstructed as the authors become disillusioned with the Soviet Union and move away from the "technological optimism... depicting a quasi-Marxist perfection" to address the failures of the Soviet society. In writing about the Noon Universe, the Strugatsky brothers have been argued to have created their own utopian ideology, or "amateur personal metaphysics", that is based on the primacy of science like more modern view of transhumanism.

Critic Ezra Glinter described the Noon Universe as a socialist utopia in which humanity has survived its crises but still has problems to solve, and in which the conflict is between "the good and the better".

In Russia, it has been suggested that James Cameron's Avatar's lush jungle planet has been inspired by the planet Pandora of Noon Universe. The suggestion was refuted.

Noon Universe's human civilization has been described as techno-patriarchal and some of the antagonists as eco-matriarchal.
