= The Suitcase (novel) =

1986 book by Sergei Dovlatov

The Suitcase (Russian: Чемодан, romanized: Chemodan) is a novel by Sergei Dovlatov, published in Russian in 1986 and in English translation by Antonina W. Bouis in 1990. Although loosely connected into a novel, The Suitcase is a collection of eight stories of life in the Soviet Union based on eight items brought in the author's suitcase from the USSR to exile in the United States in 1978.
