= Antagonist Movement =

Cultural movement against commercialization

The Antagonist Art Movement was a cultural movement formed in New York City in 2000. The group grew out of desperation and in reaction to the New York art market. The movement primarily involves visual arts, literature, film, art manifestos, and graphic design. The Antagonist Art Movement articulates its anti-commercial politics through a rejection of the prevailing standards in the art market and focuses its efforts on creating non-commercial cultural works and venues. The Antagonists foster emerging talent by providing opportunities for the exhibition of works, networking with other artists, mentoring, and resources. The Antagonist Movement has worked with more than 3,500 artists from around the world over the past 14 years.

== History ==
Ethan Minsker, Sergio Vega, and Anders Olson first conceived of the Antagonist Movement while working in bars on the Lower East Side. Influenced by punk rock, pop art and by the Dada movement, they wanted to create an event that would also incorporate their individual passions: art, film, music, and writing. The first art show was held in the basement of Niagara Bar in January 2000. It featured art by Minsker, Olson and Dima Drjuchin. The owners of the bar asked the group to do this pop-up art event every Thursday for one year. They would end up doing these one-night art shows for over 11 years, showcasing the works of more than 3,000 up-and-coming artists. The Antagonists added live performances to the events, such as Schocholautte, Lisa Jaeggi, Carla Rhodes, Champions of Sound, Dead on a Friday and Vic Ruggiero. Minsker used film to document the larger events of the group and events held in other U.S. cities and abroad.

In 2002, the Antagonists began a writers' night on Sunday nights at Black & White Bar, just a few blocks away. The actor and comedian Jonah Hill was discovered performing at one of these events. Past hosts of the writers' night have included Bryan Middleton, Richard Allen, and Brother Mike Cohen. Minsker took the helm of the Antagonist Movement in 2003 when Vega and Olson began spending more time on other projects. Around this time, the group appointed its first art directors who would guide the artistic direction of the movement. Gabriel Coutu-Dumont and Anders Olson served in this capacity from 2000-2005. Ted Riederer was the artistic director from 2005 to the present. Riederer's other major projects include Never Records.

Starting in 2007, the Antagonists began developing cultural exchanges with artists in other countries, traveling to Germany in 2007, Portugal in 2010, and Ecuador in 2013.

== Activities ==
The movement's activities have included public gatherings, demonstrations, the publication of art/literary journals, the production of documentary films, a clothing line, weekly art shows, writers' nights and a public access television show. For many of its members, the Movement is a protest against the established commercial art market which allows few opportunities for unknown artists to succeed. The Movement also has participants in other US cities, Europe and South America.

=== Films ===
- The Soft Hustle (2000)
- Mark of the Ninja (2004)
- This Is Berlin, Not New York (2008)
- The Dolls of Lisbon (2011), a 72-minute art documentary featuring underground artists from the United States, Ecuador, Portugal
- Self Medicated (2014)

=== Broadcast ===
Current TV (2007–2008)

Originally scheduled to be a ten episode series about the Antagonist Movement, only four episodes were broadcast after the channel changed its format to half-hour shows. NYC Underwater, Angst, Lies & Audio Tape, Make Your Own Damn Shirt and Album Armor were featured in the shows. The producer of this series, Anthony Ferraro, is a member of the Antagonist. He worked on a number of Antagonist films before moving to California and beginning work at Current TV. Some of the short Antagonist videos were featured on Current's foreign channels as well as in-flight programming for Virgin Atlantic.

Public Access TV (2003-present)

Titled "Antagovision", this show is broadcast on Manhattan Neighborhood Network Channel 67 every Tuesday night at 11 pm. There are more than 60 28-minute episodes, interviews, live music and short films of the events sponsored by the Antagonist Movement.

=== Publishing ===
The Antagonist Movement began its publishing department after taking over Psycho Moto fanzine.

- Psycho Moto Zine (2000–2006, 2013-Present)
- Somewhere Between a Punch and a Handshake (2004), written by Brother Mike Cohen with artwork by Andy Mags, Un Lee and Vickers Gringo.
- Rich Boy Cries for Momma (2010), a fictional memoir by Ethan H. Minsker, is a coming-of-age novel set during the period of D.C.'s hardcore music scene, drawn from Minsker's experiences growing up in Washington, D.C. during the 1970s and 1980s. The cover art is by Kevin Cyr, and the inside illustrations are by Ted Riederer. In August 2011, Rich Boy Cries for Momma was featured in the art show "I Bleed Black" at the Marianne Boesky Gallery.
- Barstool Prophets (2011), a fictional memoir by Ethan H. Minsker, the second in a trilogy of novels, set in the bars of New York's Lower East Side. The book chronicles the neighborhood over 20 years from the early 1990s through its period of gentrification. The cover art is by Dan Krupin and the inside illustrations are by Dan Krupin and Un Lee.

== Members ==
The head curator of the Antagonist Movement is Ethan Minsker. Notable members of the group have included Ryan Adams, Richard Allen, Shepard Fairey, Erik Foss, Richard Hambleton, Jonah Hill, Lenny Kaye, Wes Lang, Legs McNeil, Fabrizio Moretti, Johnny Valiant, and Arturo Vega.
