= Far Rainbow =

1963 novel by Arkady and Boris Strugatsky

- First US edition
- Author: Arkady and Boris Strugatsky
- Original title: Далёкая Радуга
- Translator: Alan Myers (Mir edition, 1967), Antonina W. Bouis (Macmillan edition, 1979)
- Cover artist: Richard M. Powers
- Language: Russian
- Series: Noon Universe
- Genre: Science fiction
- Publisher: Mir in USSR, Macmillan in U.S.
- Publication date: 1963
- Publication place: Soviet Union
- English publication date: 1967 in USSR, 1979 1st in U.S.
- Media type: Print (Hardcover)
- ISBN: 0-02-615200-2 (US edition)
- OCLC: 4983091
- Dewey Decimal: 891.73/44 19
- LC Class: PG3476.S78835 D33 1979
- Preceded by: Escape Attempt
- Followed by: Hard to Be a God

Far Rainbow (Russian: Далёкая Радуга, romanized: Dalyokaya Raduga, pronounced [dɐˈlʲɵkajə ˈradʊɡə]) is a 1963 science fiction novel by Soviet writers Boris and Arkady Strugatsky, set in the Noon Universe.

== Plot summary ==
The novel tells the story of the Rainbow catastrophe of 2156. It starts very simple, as a Wave observer Robert Sklyarov notices an unusually persistent Wave and reports it to the Capital (the only city on the scientists' planet, whose primarily mission is conducting zero-transportation experiments, of which the Waves, destroying everything from the planet poles onward, are a sidekick). Simultaneously, Camill (the last remaining of "the Baker's Dozen" of seeds) appears at his observation tower and tells him to leave it and fly south immediately. Sklyarov refuses to leave precious ulmotrons behind and urges Camill for help but when the wind front preceding the Wave strikes, the falling machinery seemingly kills Camill. Terrified Sklyarov flees south.

Back in the Capital, everything is still quiet. Leonid Gorbovsky, whose Tariel II has delivered scientific equipment to Rainbow, pays a visit to Matvei Vyazanitsyn, the general director of the planet, then returns to his ship, when the ominous news come. Camill contacts (via videophone) the nearest scientist village and issues a warning that the Wave Sklyarov saw is closely followed by another one of a new type. According to him, it cannot be stopped like the ones before and therefore the Rainbow world council must begin the evacuation of the planet immediately. At this moment the Wave reaches Camill's observation tower and he dies once again.

Soon enough it becomes clear that humans cannot hold the new Wave back and an order to gather the entire population in the Capital is issued. Robert Sklyarov witnesses the Wave destroying semi-automatic charybdis Wave-stopper tanks and tries to pilot one manually to give his friends time to flee. In the end, his charybdis is destroyed, too, but Sklyarov manages to escape and sets off (on a flier) for the Children Village, where his fiancée, Tatiana Turchina, works as a governess. He finds the Village already empty but on the way to the Capital, he locates on the ground an out-of-fuel aerobus that was carrying some of the children from the Village as well as Turchina herself. Having to choose whom to take with him (his flier can only carry two people), Sklyarov decides for his fiancée even though he knows that she would hate him for leaving the children behind and actually kidnapping her.

Meanwhile in the Capital, the situation is close to panic. Everyone knows by now that Gorbovsky's Tariel II cannot evacuate them all, and that additional spaceships will not arrive in time. Plans like burrowing a huge cave under the Capital to hide from the Wave, or jumping over it, or diving under it (in the southern ocean) are desperately developed. At this time, Gorbovsky personally takes the hard decision on who is to be saved (same as Robert not long ago) and announces that only the children will be transported onto the orbit on Tariel II. Everyone agrees that this is the best choice. Afterwards a crowd of scientists approaches him and asks to take some of their documentation on board, since they consider it too valuable to be sent directly into space with mini-rockets. Robert tries to save Tatiana one more time, arguing with Gorbovsky on sending her up with the children, but Tatiana downright refuses, hating Robert at the moment for leaving the children from her aerobus to certain death.

In the very last moment, Gorbovsky refuses to board his ship, leaving his first mate in charge and making even more space for the children and documentation. Tariel, dismantled from the regular spaceship to the status of life raft and leaving behind parts of her machinery as well as her captain, lifts off when the Waves (both northern and southern) are a few kilometers away from the Capital. Shortly before the two reach it, Gorbovsky, Camill, Sklyarov and Turchina (in peace with Robert again in their last minutes) sit on the beach not far from the city and watch a team of null-T-testers float their blind team-mate toward the southern Wave, while he is playing a song on the banjo.

== Aftermath ==
Later books show Gorbovsky alive and well. It is implicitly assumed that the situation defused itself and the Waves self-destructed before reaching the Capital. Still, this was not the intention of the authors; as they told themselves, they simply forgot about the fate of Gorbovsky. The chronology of the Noon world is full of inconsistencies, with Gorbovsky's miraculous salvation being, perhaps, the most prominent of them.

== Publishing history ==
The novel was originally written in 1962 and first published in Russian in the 1963 sci fi compilation "New Signal System" (Новая сигнальная) by Soviet Znanie Publishing House, reissued in the same year. In English it was first translated by Alan Myers and published by Soviet Mir Publishing House in 1967. In the United States the novel was again translated by Antonina W. Bouis and published in a 1979 book (with another Strugatskys' novel The Second Invasion from Mars) by Macmillan.
