= Beetle in the Anthill =

1979 novel by Boris and Arkady Strugatsky

- Russian cover of the novel
- Author: Arkady and Boris Strugatsky
- Original title: Жук в муравейнике
- Translator: Antonina W. Bouis
- Language: Russian
- Series: Noon Universe
- Genre: Science fiction novel
- Publisher: Macmillan
- Publication date: 1979
- Publication place: Soviet Union
- English publication date: 1980
- Media type: Print (Hardcover)
- ISBN: 0-02-615120-0
- OCLC: 6421596
- Dewey Decimal: 891.73/44
- LC Class: PG3476.S78835 Z4913
- Preceded by: The Kid from Hell
- Followed by: The Time Wanderers

Beetle in the Anthill (Russian: Жук в муравейнике, romanized: Zhuk v muraveynike, pronounced [ʐuk v mʊrɐˈvʲejnʲɪkʲɪ]) is a 1979 science fiction novel by Russian writers Boris and Arkady Strugatsky, set in the Noon Universe.

Beetle in the Anthill is the title of a theory explaining the Stepchildren phenomenon. Another example of such a title in Strugatskys' books is the Roadside Picnic, describing a possible origin of the "Zones".

== Plot summary ==
Beetle in the Anthill is the sequel to Prisoners of Power, but its plot is almost independent.

The novel is set in 2178 AD (approximately 20 years after the events of Prisoners of Power) and follows the story of the main character of the first novel, Maxim Kammerer. Kammerer, now an experienced investigator of COMCON-2, receives an order to track down a man named Lev Abalkin, who was not supposed to return to Earth but has returned nevertheless. The order was issued in secret by Rudolf Sikorski (called "Excellency" throughout the book), the chief of COMCON-2.

Studying the materials on Abalkin that Sikorski provided him with, Kammerer discovers that prior to his arrival on Earth, Abalkin was a progressor on Saraksh, working as an undercover agent in the power structures of the Island Empire. Among other materials, he finds a sheet of paper with a strange symbol resembling the Cyrillic letter Ж or Japanese character 卅 (san juu) which only adds to his confusion.

Kammerer's search leads him to several of Abalkin's friends and associates, including Maya Glumova who is a historian working in the Museum of Extraterrestrial Cultures (MEC) and Shokn the Golovan who worked closely with Abalkin in projects on Saraksh and Hope. Each of these has had recent contact with Abalkin, and report that he had been behaving strangely.

Kammerer also begins to perceive a connection between Abalkin and progressor Kornei Yashmaa. Both men were born on the same day from mysteriously deceased parents.

Late at night, Sikorski orders Kammerer to meet him at the MEC in order to ambush Abalkin. However, the one who comes to the Museum tonight is not Lev Abalkin but rather Isaac Bromberg, Sikorski's fiercest opponent in his policy about knowledge and its classification. Kammerer witnesses a long verbal argument, in which many of the details of the Abalkin case are revealed.

Apparently, Abalkin has called Bromberg via videophone and talked to him about the "detonators", an artifact stored in the closed section of the MEC where Sikorski and Kammerer had laid their trap. Reluctantly, Sikorski agreed to tell Maxim about the "foundlings": Abalkin (as well as Kornei Yashmaa) was a "foundling", one of thirteen humans born from embryos stored in the "sarcophagus" left by the Wanderers and discovered by Earthlings on an unnamed planet. The "detonators" were thirteen small discs each carrying a strange symbol identical to a birthmark that each of the "foundlings" had on his/her elbow. Abalkin's symbol was the one resembling the Japanese character 卅

Upon returning to his COMCON-2 office with Maxim, Sikorski admits that he always believed that all "foundlings" carried a program deep in their subconsciousness that was potentially dangerous for Earth. It was because of this that all of them received an education that implied that they work as far from Earth as possible. Sikorski believes that Abalkin's surprise return to Earth indicates that the program has activated and he has become a dangerous agent of the Wanderers.

Kammerer does not believe that Abalkin poses a threat, but suggests that this is a psychological test engineered by the Wanderers. Kammerer likens the situation to when a human might put a "beetle in an anthill" simply to watch the alarmed reaction of the ants. Sikorski, however, is afraid that the situation may turn out to be "weasel in a henhouse" instead, so he cannot neglect the potential danger to Earth.

Eventually Abalkin comes to Sikorski and Kammerer voluntarily, and finds the truth about his origins. He demands to be left alone, but Sikorski orders Kammerer to follow him. Sikorski himself sets off for the MEC. Kammerer, guessing what is to come, tries to convince Abalkin to leave Earth for his own safety, but to no effect. Abalkin enters the Museum of Extraterrestrial Cultures, and is shot three times by Sikorski and dies on the floor millimeters from his "detonator".

== Analysis ==
The question if Abalkin really had some program inside him and was a dangerous agent of the Wanderers was intentionally left unanswered by the authors. Later in interviews Boris Strugatsky told that Abalkin had been just an ordinary man with no program and had been a victim of unfavorable circumstances. Abalkin learned by chance that he has been banned from Earth and wanted to know the truth about himself, so he came to Earth and tried to make sure that his memories were real. Later he came in the MEC only to see Maya Glumova whom he loved and was surprised to see the "detonator" with the mark very similar to his own. Anyway, some details of the text contradict this explanation blatantly.

== Sequel ==
A sequel to the novel, Лишь разумные свободны? has been written by Amnuel Pesakh in 1998.

== English translations ==
1. Strugatsky, Arkady and Boris. Beetle in the Anthill (Best of Soviet Science Fiction) translated by Antonina W. Bouis. New York: Macmillan Pub Co, October 1, 1980, 217 pp. ISBN 0-02-615120-0. LCCCN: 80017172.
2. Strugatsky, Arkady and Boris. The Beetle in the Anthill translated by Olena Bormashenko. Chicago Review Press, 18 April 2023. ISBN 1641606789
