= Isay Davydov =

Russian writer and journalist (1927–2020)

Isay Davydov (Russian: Исай Давыдов; 24 October 1927 – 20 November 2020) is the pen name of David Isaakovich Sheinberg (Дави́д Исаа́кович Ше́йнберг) Soviet and Russian writer, literary critic, and journalist. He is best known for his 1969 planetary romance novel I Will Return in a Thousand Years.

== Notable literary works ==
Davydov is the author of 36 books (novels and short story collections)

- 1965: Девушка из Пантикапея (A Girl from Pantikapaion)
  Davydov's debut in science fiction, serialized in Uralsky Sledopyt nos. 1, 2, 1965
- 1966: He Loved You (Он любил вас)
  A young Soviet cosmonaut collects all nuclear warheads and flies to die and destroy an asteroid that threatens the Earth.
- 1969:I Will Return in a Thousand Years (Russian: Я вернусь через тысячу лет)
  - 2013, 2014: sequels: Book 2, Book 3 (limited print, 100 copies each; available as an e-book)

=== A Girl from Pantikapaion ===
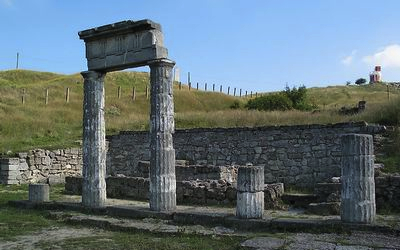
Pantikapaion ruins

A girl Kornelia from the 4th century ancient Greek Pantikapaion was saved from Goths by aliens, who took her on their explorer spaceship. She grew up there and was returned to the 20th century Earth, to the Soviet Crimea, to Kerch, the place of the ruins of Pantikapaion. The alien starship commander told her that they will return in one year and take her back, if she would like. But Kornelia found her love on the Earth.

Vladimir Larionov writes that the novel was written rather realistically (keeping in mind the science fiction setting). In some places it looks rather naive for a modern reader, but it was a good read at the times when it was published. In addition to the adventure and love plot lines, the novel tells the story of the civilization severely thrown back in its development by a nuclear war.

=== I Will Return in a Thousand Years ===
The novel is a planetary romance, in which a team of progressors from the Earths's communist society flies to a remote star system to speed up the development of a Stone Age society. In an interview Davydov said that he took the idea of progressorship from the 1964 novel Hard to Be a God by Strugatsky Brothers. The first book ended on a pessymistic note resembling that of Hard to Be a God. Davydov wrote sequels, with an optimistic ending, but could not get them published, by agitprop unwritten orders. A Soviet satirist Igor Tarabukin allegedly quipped "This novel is in need of a different author".

Davydov's description of the communist society deviated from the canonical image of perfect men. For example the invention of "coems" (emotion recorders) was stolen from the main protagonist by another team member.

== Awards ==
- 2014: Aelita Prize for I Will Return in a Thousand Years
- 2015: Hypeboloid award of the Aelita convent for original and innovative ideas
