= Hard to Be a God =

1964 novel by Arkady and Boris Strugatsky

- Author: Arkady and Boris Strugatsky
- Original title: Трудно быть богом
- Translators: Wendayne Ackerman (1973), Olena Bormashenko (2014)
- Language: Russian
- Series: Noon Universe
- Genre: Science fiction
- Publisher: Seabury Press
- Publication date: 1964
- Publication place: Soviet Union
- English publication date: 1973
- Media type: Print (Hardcover)
- ISBN: 0-8164-9121-6
- OCLC: 481252
- Dewey Decimal: 891.7/3/44
- LC Class: PG3488.T73 T713
- Preceded by: Far Rainbow
- Followed by: Disquiet

Hard to Be a God (Russian: Трудно быть богом, romanized: Trudno byt' bogom) is a 1964 science fiction novel by the Soviet writers Arkady and Boris Strugatsky, set in the Noon Universe.

== Premise and themes ==
The novel follows Anton (alias Don Rumata throughout the book), an undercover operative from the future planet Earth, in his mission on an alien planet that is populated by human beings whose society has not advanced beyond the Middle Ages. The novel's core idea is that human progress throughout the centuries is often cruel and bloody, and that religion and blind faith can be effective tools of oppression, working to destroy the emerging scientific disciplines and enlightenment. The title refers to Anton's perception of his precarious role as an observer on the planet, for while he has far more advanced knowledge than the people around him, he is forbidden to assist too actively as his assistance would interfere with the natural progress of history. (See "Zoo hypothesis"). The narrative delves into the subjectivity of the main character, showing his own Character arc from an emotionally uninvolved 'observer' to the person who rejects his blind belief in theory when confronted with the cruelty of real events.

== Plot summary ==
The prologue depicts a scene from before the main events of the novel, in which the protagonist Anton goes on an adventure with his friends Pashka (Paul) and Anka (Anna), and they engage in imaginative play that they are on an unnamed medieval planet. They find an abandoned road with a sign reading "Wrong Way". Anton decides to follow the road and returns to tell his friends that he found remnants from World War II – a skeleton of a German gunner chained to his machine gun.

The main events of the novel take place on an unnamed medieval planet, with Anton and Pashka taking the roles of observers of its people. Anton adopts the name "Don Rumata" and is based in the Arkanar Kingdom and Pashka adopts the name "Don Gug" (or "Don Hug", depending on translation) in the Irukan Duchy. Rumata visits the Drunken Den, a meeting place for observers. He is investigating the disappearance of a famed scientist, Doctor Budach, who may have been kidnapped by Don Reba, the Prime Minister of Arkanar. Don Reba has been leading a campaign against all educated people in the kingdom, blaming them for all the calamities and misfortunes of the kingdom. Rumata feels alarmed, as the kingdom is changing into a fascist police state, which would not have happened in similar medieval societies on Earth. Rumata has been working to save the most talented poets, writers, doctors and scientists, smuggling them abroad into neighboring countries.

Rumata tries to convince his colleagues that a more active intervention must take place. However, Don Gug and Don Kondor (an elder and more experienced observer who often travels by helicopter) feel that he has become too involved in local affairs and cannot look at the situation with a broader historical perspective. Rumata agrees to continue his work.

Back in the city, Rumata tries pumping multiple people for information, including Waga Kolesol, a local head of organized crime. He also attends a soirée organized by Don Reba's lover, Doña Ocana, who is also rumored to be Don Reba's confidante. Rumata tries to seduce her and pump her for information, but he's disgusted with himself and retreats. Rumata's love interest, a young commoner named Kira, who can't stand the brutality and horrors of fascist Arkanar any longer, asks to stay in Rumata's house. Rumata gladly agrees and promises to take her with him back to Earth.

His other plans take a bad turn. Life in Arkanar becomes less and less tolerable. Reba orders the torture and execution of Doña Ocana. Rumata, faced with the horrible consequences of his power-play, goes into a drunken stupor. Finally, left with no other option, in front of the King, Rumata openly accuses Don Reba of kidnapping a famous physician whom he (Rumata) had invited to tend to the King's maladies.

The ensuing events prove that Don Reba had anticipated and prepared for this. After confessing that he did, in fact, kidnap Dr. Budach, fearing that the man is not to be trusted with the King's life, Don Reba apologizes. He then brings forward a physician, introducing him as Dr. Budach. The next night, Rumata, whose turn it is to guard the royal prince and only heir to the throne, is suddenly overwhelmed by dozens of Don Reba's men, and while fighting for his life witnesses them murdering the prince. They are in turn massacred by monks, apparently members of the Holy Order, a militaristic religious sect. Defeated, Rumata is brought in front of Don Reba.

Don Reba reveals that he has been watching Don Rumata for some time – in fact he recognizes Rumata as an impostor – the real Rumata having died a long time ago. However, Don Reba realizes that there is some supernatural power behind Rumata. Rumata's gold is of impossibly high quality and Rumata's sword-fighting style is unheard of, yet he has never killed a single person while staying in Arkanar despite fighting in numerous duels. Don Reba instinctively feels that killing Rumata may lead to retribution from Rumata's presumed demonic allies and tries to forge a treaty with him.

During their conversation, Rumata finally understands the magnitude of Reba's plotting. The presented physician was not Budach. The impostor was promised a position as the royal physician and was instructed to give the King a potion that was really a poison. The King died and the physician was executed for murdering the king. With the death of the royal prince during Rumata's guard and the King dead at the hands of "Budach", Rumata can be blamed for staging a coup. At the same time, the organized crime groups of Waga Kolesol, secretly encouraged by Don Reba, begin to pillage the city.

Don Reba then calls in the Holy Order's army, which quickly dispatches the criminals and the guardsmen alike, seizing the defenseless city with minimal losses. Reba has become the new head of state, a magister of the Holy Order and bishop and governor of Arkanar, now the Order's province.

Shocked and infuriated, Rumata still holds his ground, and forms a non-aggression pact with Don Reba. He uses his new status to rescue the real Dr. Budach as well as his own friend Baron Pampa from prison. Around him, Arkanar succumbs to the Holy Order. As the last of his friends and allies die and suffer in the turmoil, Rumata acts with all haste to expedite the departure of Budach.

Rumata returns to his home to discover his most loyal servant killed during a fight with a squad of Reba's storm troopers (or Sturmoviks) who had gained entrance into the house; a unit of the Holy Order then saved the rest of the household.

The three observers meet again to discuss the future. Both his colleagues feel tortured by remorse, however, there is nothing to be done now. Don Kondor suggests that Rumata act carefully, as it is clear that Don Reba can go back on their deal at any moment. He warns Rumata that his lover Kira can be used against him.

Before Budach's departure, Rumata asks him a theological question: "what would you ask a god, if he could come from sky and fulfill any of your wishes?". After a long discussion – with Budach wishing and Rumata explaining the dire consequences of each of the wishes, Budach finally states that the only true gift a god could give the people is to leave them to their affairs. To this, Rumata replies that he cannot bear the sight of their suffering. Kira notices that Rumata referred to himself in that last sentence, rather than some hypothetical god, and looks at him "with horror and hope".

Budach crosses the border successfully and is saved. Feeling confident in his superior abilities and contacts in the military and the criminal world alike, Rumata plans to escape with Kira to Earth. A unit of soldiers arrives in order to capture Kira, considering Rumata absent from his home. In the confusion a crossbowman shoots her through the window. She dies in Rumata's arms. As the soldiers break the front door, Rumata, maddened with grief, unsheathes his swords and waits for them.

In the epilogue Pashka summarizes the subsequent events to Anka while waiting for Anton in some recovery medical institution. The space station had gone on alert when the house was attacked. However, they hadn't had time to react. Having doused the entire city with a sleep-inducing gas, they had discovered that Anton had already fought his way through the city towards the palace, covered in blood, where he had finally presumably killed Reba himself. Remembering the events of the prologue, Pashka wonders whether the episode when Anton decided to disobey the "Wrong Way" sign and found "a skeleton of a fascist", had signified some deeper meaning about the course of history.

== History ==
According to Boris Strugatsky, the concept behind Hard to Be a God started as a "fun adventure story in the spirit of The Three Musketeers" while the brothers were writing Escape Attempt, which mentions a character who is a spy on another planet. It was originally titled Seventh Heaven and then renamed The Observer as they developed the novel. The backlash from the Manege Affair in 1962 caused the authors to rethink the tone of the novel. There was a sudden backlash against any form of abstract art, and it came to a head at a March 1963 meeting of the Union of Soviet Writers when an argument broke out about the direction of Soviet science fiction being too abstract, and one story even being accused of supporting fascism. After that meeting, the brothers shifted the novel to be a "story about the fate of intelligentsia, submerged in the twilight of the middle ages", and finished writing in June 1963. In the process of sharing the manuscript with other writers and editors, they made many changes, including a suggestion from Ivan Yefremov that the character Don Rebia be changed to Don Reba because it was too obvious an anagram for Lavrentiy Beria. They didn't run into any censorship issues, but after the novel was published, some of their peers accused the book of abstractionism, surrealism, and pornography, each of them a grave offense in the view of the Party, and Yefremov published an article defending the novel from those allegations.

== Translations ==
The first English translation of the novel by Wendayne Ackerman, published in 1973, was made from a German translation of the original Russian. In 2014 the Chicago Review Press published the first direct-to-English translation by Olena Bormashenko.

== Reception and influence ==
Theodore Sturgeon praised Hard to Be a God as "one of the most skillfully written, heavily freighted sf novels I have ever read," saying "The writing is well paced and the narrative is beautifully structured." Publishers Weekly wrote "The unadorned prose cloaks rich ideas, illustrating the ability of imaginative literature to probe troubling moral questions."

The novel was included into the 2013 list 100 Books for Schoolchildren recommended by the Ministry of Education and Science (Russia).

Soviet writer Isay Davydov said that he took the idea of progressorship, the core of his novel I Will Return in a Thousand Years, from Strugatsky's Hard to Be a God.

== Adaptations ==
Hard to Be a God was adapted multiple times in different media.

=== Theatrical films ===
- 1989 film directed by Peter Fleischmann and with an appearance by Werner Herzog
- 2013 film known previously as History of the Arkanar Massacre, directed by Aleksei German.

=== Television ===
- Hard to Be a God (2026), a ten-episode Russian science-fiction television series directed by Dmitry Tyurin and starring Aleksandar Radojičić as Don Rumata.

=== Without Weapons ===
Without Weapons (Без оружия, Bez oruzhia) also known as A Man from a Distant Star (Человек с далёкой звезды, Chelovek s dalyokoy zvezdy) was a play created by the Strugatsky brothers themselves in 1989. It roughly followed the plot of the book and revealed several previously unknown details. Certain characters were also combined for the sake of brevity. The play was most likely created as a reaction to the 1989 Peter Fleischmann film.

=== PC Game ===
In 2007, the French video game company Nobilis Group published a CD-ROM PC game based on the book.

== See also ==
- (in Russian) Boris Strugatsky, Comments to the traversed: 1961–1963
