= Hard to Be a God (2013 film) =

2013 film by Aleksei Yuryevich German

- Film poster
- Directed by: Aleksei German
- Written by: Aleksei German; Svetlana Karmalita
- Based on: Hard to Be a God by Arkady and Boris Strugatsky
- Starring: Leonid Yarmolnik
- Cinematography: Vladimir Ilyin; Yuri Klimenko
- Edited by: Maria Amosova
- Music by: Viktor Lebedev
- Production companies: Lenfilm Studio; Sever Studio; Telekanal Rossiya
- Release dates: 13 November 2013 (Rome); 27 February 2014 (Russia)
- Running time: 177 minutes
- Countries: Russia; Czech Republic
- Language: Russian
- Budget: USD$7 million
- Box office: $35,919

Hard to Be a God (Russian: Трудно быть богом, romanized: Trudno byt' bogom) is a 2013 Russian epic medieval science fiction film directed by Aleksei German who co-wrote the screenplay with Svetlana Karmalita. It was his last film and it is based on the 1964 novel of the same name by Arkady and Boris Strugatsky.

A team of scientists travels to the planet Arkanar, which is inhabited by humans identical to those of Earth. Arkanar civilization is culturally and technologically similar to medieval Europe, and anyone considered "intellectual" is executed. The Earth scientists are ordered not to interfere and to conceal their identities but one of them, wishing to stop the senseless murders of brilliant minds, must eventually pick a side.

== Plot ==
A group of 30 scientists travel from Earth to a nearly-identical alien planet that is culturally and technologically centuries behind. The inhabitants of this planet have brutally suppressed a Renaissance movement, murdering anybody they consider to be an intellectual, and thus the planet is stuck in the Middle Ages. Anton, one of the scientists from Earth, is sent to infiltrate the local populace of the Kingdom of Arkanar and help them progress as a society, although he is forbidden from getting involved with local politics or forcibly interfering with the advancement of technology or culture. He assumes the identity of Don Rumata, a nobleman who resides in a large castle surrounded by poverty. There, he lives with Ari, a young woman whom he has taken as his bride, and the juvenile prince of Arkanar. Rumata's presence divides local opinion; some treat him as a God, others despise him.

Don Rumata tasks himself with finding Budakh, a doctor who has been kidnapped by Don Reba, the tyrannical prime minister of Arkanar. Reba's militia, referred to as "the Greys", are responsible for the murder of many intellectuals, including scientists and writers. During his travels, Rumata witnesses the backward ways of the locals and becomes increasingly frustrated with them. Slavery is rife, and the influence of Reba's Greys turns Arkanar into a police state. One night, while guarding the prince, the Greys besiege the castle and attempt to arrest Rumata. Rumata attempts to escape, but is ambushed and taken before his rival, Don Reba. Reba does not trust Rumata and claims he is an impostor. Rumata reasons with Reba and is freed, along with Budakh.

Later, Rumata meets his friend Pampa, a drunken and washed-up baron. Rumata teaches Pampa his famed signature sword-fighting technique. When Rumata returns to his castle, he finds the local area has been taken over by religious zealots in his absence, called "the Blacks", who prove to be just as oppressive as the Greys. Rumata discovers that Budakh is an impostor, and that the real Budakh is still imprisoned at Don Reba's castle. He returns to Reba on peaceful terms and searches the sewers of the castle for Budakh. He eventually finds him, as well as Baron Pampa, who has been tortured by Reba's men. Rumata, Pampa and Budakh escape Reba's castle, but Pampa is shot by archers and killed.

Upon returning to his village, Rumata becomes annoyed when he discovers that Budakh, apparently a great doctor and intellectual, is actually a bumbling fool who is unable to even urinate properly. He sends Budakh away and retires to his castle. The next day, the Greys attack the castle and kill Ari. Enraged, Rumata butchers their leader.

The next morning, a group of travelers investigates the aftermath of the ensuing battle, which has cost the lives of most of Arkanar's inhabitants. Among the dead civilians and soldiers, they find a lone survivor, Don Rumata. The leader of the travelers, another incognito scientist from Earth, offers to take Rumata back to Earth, but Rumata refuses. He instead gives the fellow scientist advice—that it is "hard to be a God". Months later, during the winter, Rumata is shown traveling away from Arkanar.

== Cast ==
- Leonid Yarmolnik – Don Rumata
- Dmitri Vladimirov
- Laura Pitskhelauri
- Aleksandr Ilyin – Arata
- Yuri Tsurilo – Don Pampa
- Yevgeni Gerchakov – Budakh
- Aleksandr Chutko – Don Reba
- Oleg Botin – Bucher
- Pyotr Merkuryev

== Production ==
Filming began in the autumn of 2000 in the Czech Republic and continued off-and-on for a period of several years, ending in August 2006 at the Lenfilm studios in Saint Petersburg, Russia. During the lengthy editing and post-production stage, in February 2013, German died before the film could be completed. Production was concluded by members of his family. The film was premiered at the 2013 Rome Film Festival (out of competition).

The film was reported to have been renamed to The History of the Arkanar Massacre (Russian: История арканарской резни). The press has also mentioned the alternative title The Carnage in Arkanare, and a film script published under the title "What said the tobacconist from Tobacco Street".

Later, the title was reverted to Hard to Be a God.

== Reception ==
=== Critical response ===
Reception in the Russian media was mixed. While some critics praised German's vision, others, especially in sci-fi themed media, were critical of his handling of source material.

However, Hard to Be a God received acclaim from English-language critics. Review aggregator site Rotten Tomatoes reports that 95% of critics gave the film a positive review, based on 40 reviews with an average rating of 9/10. The site's consensus reads: "A sci-fi epic with palpable connections to the present, Hard to Be a God caps director Aleksei German's brilliant filmography with a final masterpiece". Metacritic, which assigns a weighted average score out of 100 to reviews from mainstream critics, reports the film has a score of 93 based on 13 reviews.

Peter Bradshaw in The Guardian newspaper gave it five out of five, calling it: "awe-inspiring in its own monumentally mad way" and "beautiful, brilliant and bizarre". Ignatiy Vishnevetsky of The A.V. Club likened it to Orson Welles' Chimes at Midnight, naming German as "probably the most important Russian filmmaker to remain more or less completely unknown in the United States." He praised the "grotesque and deranged" medieval sci-fi film as "first and foremost a vision of human misery, brutality, and ignorance."

The location manager and sometimes film blogger Shane Scott-Travis included the film in his list "25 most beautiful films of the 21st century" (ranking it the 17th) in the website of film bloggers Taste of Cinema.

=== Best lists ===
Hard to Be a God was listed by numerous critics' and publications' as one of the top films of 2015.

- 1st – Glenn Kenny, Some Came Running
- 3rd – Ignatiy Vishnevetsky, The A.V. Club
- 3rd – Kevin B. Lee, Fandor
- 4th – J. Hoberman, Artforum
- 4th – M. Leary
- 6th – Nick Schager, The A.V. Club
- 6th – Reverse Shot
- 6th – Slant
- 6th – Ben Sachs, The Chicago Reader
- 10th – Fandor
- 11th - Film Comment
- Top 12 (unranked)- Dennis Cooper
- 13th - Adam Nayman, The A.V. Club
- 13th - The A.V. Club
- 25th - Paste
- Top 66 (unranked)- IndieWire

Hard to Be a God has also been considered one of the top films of the 2010s.

- Top 15 (unranked)- Glen Kenny, Some Came Running
- 20th - Ben Sachs, The Chicago Reader
- 23rd - Jordan Cronk

== See also ==
- List of films shot over three or more years
