= Danilov, the Violist =

1980 Soviet magical realism novel

- Author: Vladimir Orlov
- Original title: Альтист Данилов
- Translator: Antonina W. Bouis
- Genre: Magical realism; Urban fantasy; Satire
- Publisher: Novy Mir, William Morrow and Company
- Publication date: 1980
- Publication place: USSR
- English publication date: 1987
- Followed by: Aptekar'

Danilov, the Violist (Russian: Альтист Данилов, romanized: Altist Danilov) is a 1980 urban fantasy novel by Soviet Russian author Vladimir Orlov. It revolves around the misadventures of a half-demon alto violin player named Danilov. It is considered to be Orlov's most famous work.

== Background ==
Orlov first got the idea for the novel in 1968, when he saw 3 men sharing a bottle of vodka together, and imagined that a djinn might emerge from the bottle. This turned into a different novel that Orlov wrote called Aptekar' (Russian: Аптекарь, lit. 'The Pharmacist'). When beginning to write the first draft for Danilov, the poet Andrei Voznesensky commented that his demon Danilov was too similar to Woland, causing Orlov to temporarily abandon the concept. Orlov did not write the novel for publication, but rather as a gift for his wife, who was suffering from rheumatic encephalitis at the time of writing. However, publishers at Novy Mir liked the book, and decided to publish it.

Orlov's friend, Vladimir Grot, who was a violist working in the Bolshoi Theater, served as inspiration for the protagonist.

== Plot ==
Beyond the human world, there exists a demon world, commonly referred to in the novel as "The Nine Layers" (although they have very little in common with Dante's Nine Circles of Hell). The circles are organized further into chanceries. The demons have access to knowledge about the entire universe, which they study in great detail, and to magic, and love to both imitate the human world (which they call "That World") and to cause troubles for the humans.

In 1970s Moscow, Vladimir Alekseyevich Danilov is a violist for a prestigious orchestra, living in Ostankino. On the outside, he seems to be an ordinary, mild-mannered man. In fact, Danilov is secretly a half-demon with fantastic abilities such as flight, shapeshifting, and a supernatural sensitivity to the feelings and desires of humans. Danilov was forced out of the demon world for not desiring to work as a proper demon (he was too kind to hate humanity and thus purposely sabotaged his work). He was given instructions to cause mischief and misfortune for humans on Earth, and to never speak to his demon father, who was arrested for committing crimes such as being a Voltairian. However, he prefers instead to help people and devote himself to the viola.

He gets into a fight with a domovoi who caused the death of his close domovoi friend, causing a messenger from the demon world to inform him that he will be summoned soon to be tried for his crimes (of being too human). While Danilov waits for the fateful day, he gets into many misadventures- his Albani viola is stolen mysteriously, and Danilov goes to the police to put in a request to look for it, but the Albani is not found. His ex-wife, Klavdiya Petrovna, forces him to get involved with a cult-like organization; he replaces a violinist who has suffered a mysterious death, agrees to perform a symphony written by a no-name composer, and falls in love with a young woman named Natasha, much to the chagrin of his demon girlfriend, Anastasia.

His old friend from the demon world, Karmadon, comes to visit Earth and causes havoc, including a prominent episode where he turns into a blue bull and participates in bull fights in Spain. The final straw for Danilov is when Karmadon tries to seduce Natasha, which leads to Danilov challenging him to a duel. In the duel, Karmadon causes a black hole to open up in his opponent, and only the intervention of Anastasia saves Danilov from certain death. Danilov manages to wound Karmadon's face. For the duel, both Danilov and Karmadon are punished, and Danilov is summoned to face punishment for his crimes.

While the trial is organized, Danilov has time to meet with his old acquaintances. He violates the rules of the demon world and goes to visit his father. There is a great Blue Bull that Karmadon likely took inspiration from who seems to be the centerpiece of the demon world, and no demon is allowed to even look at it. Danilov not only looks at it, but scratches its back.

The trial finally begins and the demons try Danilov for varying small crimes (such as helping old ladies to cross the street). Ultimately, they find that he has grown too much like humans, and plan to execute him. When all seems lost, one demon makes a final request: by demon custom, it is proper to ask of the Abyss what it wants. The voice from the Abyss says that Danilov must stay alive (Danilov supposes the Blue Bull stepped in to save him). Danilov's sentence is changed to extreme pain from cataclysms, earthquakes, student worries, and other such things anywhere in the world. Danilov, reflecting on himself, decides he is no longer a demon, but simply a human with supernatural abilities. Anastasia begs Danilov to stay with her; when he refuses, she cuts ties with him.

Life seemingly goes back to normal, with the Albani reappearing. Danilov and Natasha live together and are happy. However, a colleague breaks beyond repair the beloved Albani, leaving Danilov broken-hearted. And yet, Danilov gets a notice from the police saying his viola has been found, and Danilov sets off to find his viola.

== Characters ==
=== Major characters ===
- Vladimir Alekseyevich Danilov, usually referred to as simply Danilov, the protagonist of the novel. He was born near the end of the 18th century to a human mother and demon father, and was brought up and raised in Hell. Other demons look down on him for his origins and for his soft-heartedness towards humanity. He is a fashionable, talented, and generous man, but weak of character and frivolous. The novel revolves around his conflict between his demonic and human sides, and how music defines humanity.
- Valentin Sergeyevich, a domovoi messenger who informs Danilov of his impending trial. He is revealed towards the end to be the boss of the Chancery of "That World".
- Natasha, Danilov's human love, a seamstress.
- Klavdiya Petrovna, Danilov's ex-wife, the engineer of much of Danilov's headaches throughout the novel
- Anastasia, a demon from Smolensk, and a "cavalry maiden". She is Danilov's demon lover.
- Karmadon, a demon ace, and a former friend of Danilov. After their duel, he is condemned to live inside an atom.
- The Blue Bull, the centerpiece of demon civilization

=== Minor characters ===
- Himeko, a Japanese demon who is Danilov's old flame
- Muravlyov family, a cultured family that Danilov occasionally spends time with
- Misha Korenev, a violinist acquaintance of Danilov, who for unknown reasons commits suicide
- Novy Margarit, Karmadon's brother
- Nikolai Zemskii, a violinist who invents the principle of "silencism" — music that is made by never touching the bow to the strings — that he believes will be the ultimate form of music. He is tied in a vague way to Korenev's death. Zemskii later goes on to destroy Danilov's viola.
- Maliban, a demon who saves Danilov from certain execution
- Pereslegin, the composer of the symphony that Danilov plays

== Analysis ==
Danilov, the Violist has been described as belonging to the Gothic tradition in Russian-language literature. It has been compared to the more well-known Master and Margarita, to the works of Aleksey Remizov, and to the works of Gogol and Hoffmann.

Yanina Yukhymuk writes that Orlov continues the tradition of the "Little Man" from Gogol's work. The "little man" is a stock character in Russian literature who is resigned to life under an unfair system that quashes him, and must in his plight either assimilate to his society or succumb to death and insanity. Danilov's status as a violist — an instrument overshadowed by violins — reflects his status in demon society as a half-demon, and the loss of his viola creates an identity crisis for Danilov, where he must choose between demon and human society. The resolution of the novel provides closure for Danilov, where he does not have to die or assimilate, but may keep his identity. Galina Shovkoplyas writes that Orlov uses mythologems and references to earlier literature — such as Lermontov's Demon and the Indo-European bull motif — to create a semi-political satire.

Deming Brown writes that while the novel does not achieve great intellectual depth, it effectively creates a phantasmagoric and entertaining fantasy, and would go on to influence Soviet literature of the 1980s. In contrast, Yelena Kovtun writes that the novel should not be considered a shallow parody of better work, but understood as a serious psychological study of how the protagonist finds his humanity, identity, and personal freedom.

== Reception ==
The novel enjoyed great success in the USSR upon release, but was quickly forgotten afterwards- the writer Valeriya Novodvorskaya commented in 2012

"Do you remember the forgotten pre-perestroika novel "Danilov, the Violist"? The waters of time have long since washed its author and its quirks, relevant only in those times, away..."

In modern times, it is considered a cult novel.

Reviews in the West were generally positive, praising the style and humor of the novel but criticizing the weak structure. The 1987 edition of Publishers Weekly wrote "Ironic and often funny, superbly translated, this first novel by a Russian writer living in Moscow is, disappointingly, so diffuse that it fails to grab hold and insist upon being read." Terry Skeats of Library Journal wrote "Orlov has written a generally engaging first novel that satirizes human behavior, individual and bureaucratic. One wishes the novel had a bit more structure, but this is nevertheless a solid work." Walter Goodman, writing for The New York Times, praised the novel, calling it a "frolicsome fantasy" and praising Orlov's satirical humor. Kirkus Reviews criticized the novel and translation, calling it "sticky".

An opera based on Danilov, the Violist was written by the composer Alexander Tchaikovsky in the early 2010s, with the involvement of Yuri Bashmet. It was staged at the Moscow Chamber Musical Theatre. There were also plans to make a film based on Danilov, with hopes of starring either Adrien Brody or Konstantin Khabensky, but the film never came to fruition.
