= Galactic Assault: Prisoner of Power =

2007 video game

- Developer(s): Paradox Interactive
- Publisher(s): Wargaming.net
- Platform(s): Microsoft Windows
- Release: September 2007
- Genre(s): Turn-based strategy

Galactic Assault: Prisoner of Power is a turn-based strategy video game developed by Paradox Interactive and published by Wargaming.net.

== Development ==
Galactic Assault: Prisoner of Power was developed by Paradox Interactive and published by Wargaming.net. The game is based on Prisoner of Power by Arkady and Boris Strugatsky. The game was originally titled Inhabited Island: Battlefield and was shown at E3 2006.

== Reception ==
Reception

Aggregate score
Aggregator	Score
Metacritic	68/100

Review scores
Publication	Score
GameSpot	7/10
GameZone	6.5/10
IGN	6.2/10
PC Gamer (UK)	6.9/10

Galactic Assault: Prisoner of Power received generally average reviews from video game critics.
