= Space Mowgli =

1971 novel by Boris and Arkady Strugatsky

- Author: Arkady and Boris Strugatsky
- Original title: Малыш
- Translator: Roger DeGaris
- Language: Russian
- Series: Noon Universe
- Genre: Science fiction novel
- Publisher: Macmillan
- Publication date: 1971
- Publication place: Soviet Union
- English publication date: 1982
- Media type: Print (Hardcover)
- Preceded by: Prisoners of Power
- Followed by: The Kid from Hell

Space Mowgli, also known as The Kid (Russian: Малыш, romanized: Malysh), is a 1971 science fiction novel by Russian writers Boris and Arkady Strugatsky, set in the Noon Universe.

== Plot summary ==
The novel describes the "Ark Project" of the year 2160 and the first (and last) contact with the Ark megaforms. The story is told by Stanislav Popov, a technician of the ER-2 team, one of the twelve ecologist teams that were working on the planet Ark to prepare it for the arrival of the colonists from the planet Pant. The ER-2 team consists of Popov, Gennady Komov, Maya Glumova and Yakov Vanderhuze.

The story begins as the members of ER-2 go on a routine exploration mission while Popov is left behind to oversee the construction of a permanent base for the arriving colonists. Suddenly, the construction robots malfunction and leave the construction site. Within a few hours, Popov locates the robots and fixes them.

After that, Popov hears a human baby crying. Popov tries to locate the source of the sound, but it stops suddenly. Since infants are not allowed to leave Earth, Popov assumes he hallucinated. Popov continues his work with the robots. He then hears a female voice pleading for help from somebody named Shura. Popov again cannot locate the source of the voice.

Meanwhile, the ER-2 exploration party discovers the wreckage of an Earth spaceship and the remains of its two pilots. They log a report describing their discovery to the orbital base. The following night, the ER-2 members begin exhibiting symptoms of psychosis. Popov is the most heavily affected, but does not tell the others about his condition in fear of being deemed unfit for duty and recalled to Earth.

During the team's breakfast the following morning, a figure of a 13-year-old human boy appears on the base. Popov ignores it, assuming it's another hallucination. However, the others see the boy too; they try to follow him but the boy quickly leaves and the explorers lose him. The team sends a report back to the orbital base and receive a reply from Leonid Gorbovsky. The mission of ER-2 is changed to establish contact with a possible alien race.

Another message identifies the wreckage discovered earlier as the spaceship Pilgrim, along with identifying the two pilots, Alexander (which may be shortened to Shura in Russian) Semyonov and his wife Maria-Luisa Semyonova. At the time of the disappearance, 13 years ago, their then newborn child Piere Semyonov was also on board. This leads the ER-2 members to assume that the boy they saw in the morning is Piere Semyonov.

The leader of the team, Komov, leaves the ship to scout the surroundings of the base. However, Piere Semyonov soon comes to the base himself. Seemingly, he tries to communicate with the humans, but they do not understand him and he leaves. The behavior of The Kid (the official nickname given to Piere, hence the Russian title of the novel) is unconventional, leading the humans to assume that he was raised by the local alien race.

Giant, segmented, insect-like antennae rise over a distant mountain range. There is no immediate connection between the antennae and the aliens. The creatures of this newly discovered race are called Ark megaforms. The reveal of their antennae appears to be an act of intimidation. It soon becomes apparent that the Ark megaforms want the humans to leave the planet immediately. The megaforms use The Kid as their negotiator with the humans. The Kid visits the ER-2 base several times. He allows the humans to study him, and to question him about his foster parents in exchange for promising to leave. The communication does not proceed smoothly as The Kid exhibits a mix of human and alien psychological traits. His way of thought seems inconceivable to the humans; though he can speak, for most of the questions he is either unable or unwilling to answer. Moreover, there is a conflict of interest, as the humans want to fully understand the Ark megaforms, while The Kid just wants them to leave.

Frustrated with the lack of progress, the humans give The Kid a portable video transmitter. They do not tell The Kid its function, and hope that he will take it with him, so that the scientists will be able to track his movements. Via the transmitter, the humans see The Kid walk to the wreckage of the Pilgrim, levitate to a distant canyon and proceed into the planet's interior. At this moment one of the humans - Maya Glumova turns on an emergency flashlight that is built into the transmitter. The transmission immediately stops. It is disputed if Maya did it on purpose. However, Komov takes full responsibility for the failure of the mission.

Gorbovsky contacts Komov and tells him that the humans will most likely be unable to establish a contact with the Ark megaforms because they are a closed civilization that avoids contacts with others. Gorbovsky informs Komov that an ancient satellite was discovered orbiting Ark. The satellite was built by the wanderers, and was programmed to destroy any approaching spaceship. Apparently, this satellite shot down the Pilgrim 13 years ago. Humans conclude that the Wanderers wanted to prevent anyone from contacting the Ark megaforms.

In the epilogue of the novel, Popov talks to The Kid over the video transmitter and reflects on the decisions made by the humans. The humans decided to evacuate Ark, hence the only remaining contact is through The Kid. Komov, some of his teammates and Piere's grandfather are allowed to talk to him, on the condition that they carefully avoid any themes related to the Ark megaforms. In the novel there is no mention whether the "Ark Project" was ever concluded.

== Publication history ==
The brothers Strugatsky conceived the idea for the novel in 1970. The working book title was "Operation MOWGLI", though was eventually published under the title Kid. Boris Strugatsky admitted that the brothers did not like the title, which was only chosen as the official name by the publisher's wishes. The novel was written in the same year and is one of a series of books set in the Noon Universe. The novel was published the year after in the journal Aurora.

The English translation was included in a single volume entitled Escape Attempt with the other Noon universe stories Escape Attempt and The Kid from Hell.

In the process of creating a 12 volume collection of the works by the brothers (via Publisher Stalker, in the year 2000), Boris Strugatsky gave legal permission for the dates to be changed in the novel. As such, the dates 20th, 231st, 233rd and 234th years became 34th, 144th, 147th, 148th years.

== Movie adaptations ==
- A partial adaptation in the third episode of the TV program This Fantastical World (1980).
- Kid (Russian: Малыш), television film, theatrical adaptation by the Central Children's Theatre (1987) (now Russian Academic Youth Theatre).
- Unplanned Meetings (Czech: Nesmluvená setkání), Czech Television film (1995).

== Translations ==
The novel was translated in about 20 languages.

- 1975: German translation: Die dritte Zivilisation by Aljonna Möckel
- 1982: English translation: Space Mowgli by Roger DeGaris
