= Vladimir Orlov (author) =

Russian novelist (1936–2014)

Vladimir Viktorovich Orlov (Russian: Влади́мир Ви́кторович Орло́в; 31 August 1936 – 5 August 2014) was a Russian novelist, notable for his fantasy novel Danilov, the Violist.

Orlov was born in Moscow, but during World War II was evacuated to Mari El. Between 1954 and 1959, he was a student at the Faculty of Journalism of the Moscow State University. Subsequently, he took a job as a reporter with the Komsomolskaya Pravda working at the construction of the Sayano-Shushenskaya Dam and Tayshet-Abakan railroad, and at the same time started to write short stories, mainly under influence of Vasily Aksyonov. He published his book of short stories "Doroga dlinoy v sem' santimetrov" (The Seven Centimetre road) in 1960 and the novel "Solyony Arbuz" (The salted watermelon) in 1965.

In 1969, Orlov published his novel, Posle dozhdichka v chetverg(After the Rain on Thursday), and decided to become a full-time writer. Between 1969 and 1975, all the books Orlov submitted for publication were rejected for ideological reasons.

In 1975 he published the novel "Proishestviye v Nikolskom" (An incident in Nikolskoye), a psychological drama about the rape of a girl by her classmates and the legal proceedings afterwards.

In 1980, Orlov published Danilov, the Violist, which immediately gained popularity. The protagonist of the novel, Danilov, is a kind-hearted and lazy half-demon who cannot decide whether he is more a demon or a human, and runs into a trouble with his demon superiors (who demand that he should be an enemy of humans, or face execution). The novel is full of mythical creatures such as domovoi. The fantasy genre was not common in the Soviet Union at the time, and this added to the popularity of the novel, which eventually became the first part of the Ostankino Stories cycle. Two more novels followed to complete the cycle: Aptekar (1988) and Shevrikuka (1997). The cycle genre is considered to be magical realism influenced by Nikolai Gogol, Fyodor Sologub and Mikhail Bulgakov. Danilov, the Violist was compared with Doctor Faustus by Thomas Mann since both novels study the diabolic and human origins of artistic creativity., and with Bulgakov's Master and Margarita.

In the 1990s and the 2000s, Orlov was teaching at the Maxim Gorky Literature Institute in Moscow.

Orlov died on August 5, 2014. He left behind a widow, Lidiya, with whom he had lived for nearly 60 years, and a son, Leonid Orlov, who as of 2014 was working as a television producer.
