= Paul Amnuél =

Israeli physicist

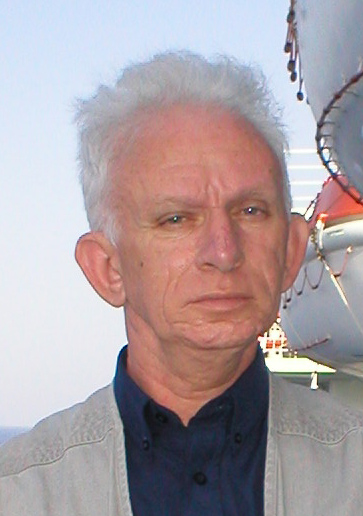
Pavel Amnuél

Paul Rafaelovich Amnuél (Hebrew: פול אמנואל; born 20 February 1944) is a Soviet and Israeli physicist and science fiction writer. He was born in Baku, Azerbaijan. He attended Azerbaijan State University and worked at Shamakhi Astrophysical Observatory for 23 years.

Prizes

- 2013 "Running on Waves" Prize (shortlist)
