= Carla Rhodes =

American photographer, ventriloquist, comedian, and musician

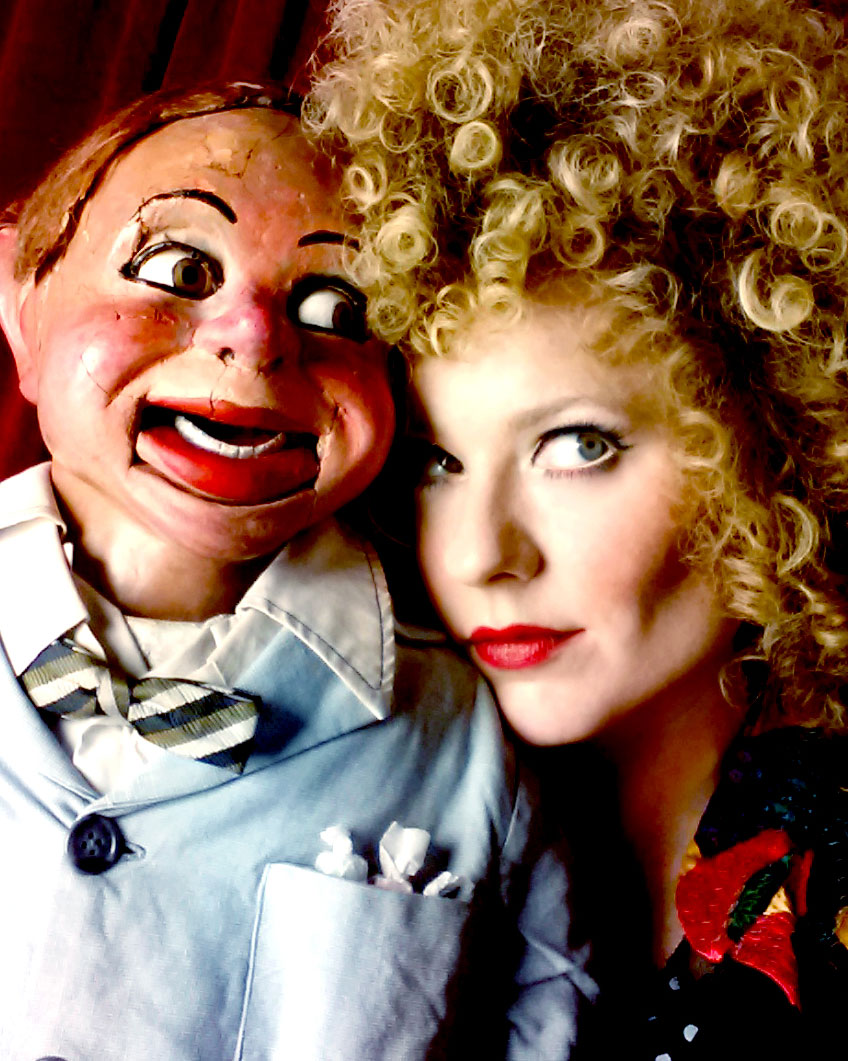
- Born: Carla Rhodes; April 16, 1982 (age 43); Louisville, Kentucky, USA
- Occupations: Wildlife conservation photographer; ventriloquist; comedian
- Website: http://www.carlarhodes.com

Carla Rhodes is an American wildlife conservation photographer. Formerly a ventriloquist, comedian, and musician, Rhodes was mentored by Shari Lewis as a teenager.

== Wildlife conservation photography ==
Carla Rhodes is a wildlife conservation photographer known for her engaging and impactful photographic stories featuring the natural world. She gravitates towards photographing misunderstood subjects, such as endangered greater adjutant storks, and overlooked "common" species.

Formerly a ventriloquist, Carla uses her unique skills in her photography practice; her work has been published in The New York Times, Smithsonian, National Wildlife, Audubon, and The Guardian.

Ultimately, Rhodes aspires for her photographs to evoke emotion, educate viewers, and inspire positive change.

== Ventriloquism ==
After seeing Shari Lewis and Lamb Chop on television at the age of 9, Rhodes taught herself ventriloquism. She began performing professionally at the age of 13 in a Louisville, Kentucky magic shop. By the age of 15, she was performing regularly at the local comedy club.

In 2009, New York Magazine named Rhodes as one of the "Ten New Comedians That Funny People Find Funny."

She adds a new twist to the old art of ventriloquism. Rhodes' main squeeze is a cantankerous 1920s gentleman named Cecil Sinclaire.

== Music ==
While attending college in Tennessee, Rhodes recorded a full-length comedy music album in Nashville. "I Love Animals", a track from Carla's Golden Hits, vol 6, was played on the Dr. Demento's "Top Funny Five", eventually placing at number two.
