= Ethan Minsker =

American writer, filmmaker and artist

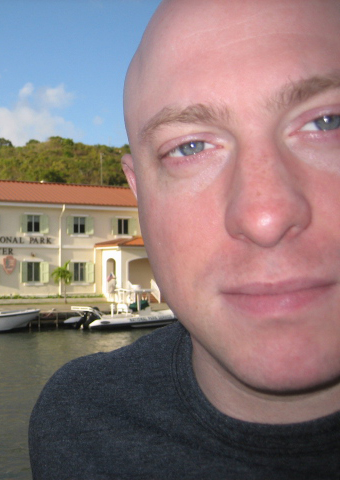
Ethan Minsker (2006)

Ethan Hart Minsker (born August 25, 1969) is an American writer, filmmaker, artist, fanzine publisher and founding member of the Antagonist Movement. His work has received a feature in the French-edition of Vice magazine.

== Films ==
A music video Minsker made for the Washington punk band Desiderata was featured on the independent section of MTV's 120 Minutes. His thesis project Amorosis, a 30-minute, 16 mm narrative film, was a finalist at the New York Film Festival. After graduating with honors, Minsker began working on independent films and music videos as a grip and electric.

Minsker's first music documentary was Anything Boys Can Do. The film was exhibited at Exit Art Gallery and the Brooklyn Museum. The film won several awards and played in 50 film festivals worldwide.

Anything Boys Can Do was followed by The Stick Up Artists in 1999, The Soft Hustle (2000), Mark of the Ninja (2004), Touching a Van Gogh (2004), This Is Berlin, Not New York (2008), and The Dolls of Lisbon in 2011, which was featured as part of a special screening at the Queens Museum of Art in New York City.

Self Medicated (2014) is a documentary film about art, artists, and their struggles to stay happy. It documents the history of the Antagonist Movement and the artists involved.

Man In Camo: The Art and Artist (2018) takes a close look at the life of Ethan Minsker and his drive to create and crusade the making of art. Through the lens of old photographs and films, Minsker leads viewers on a journey through the hurdles that once held him back, from dyslexia to the violence of 1980s Washington D.C. It was these hurdles that forged his love of film and art, and his work now spans over three decades. Man In Camo brings forth not just the love of art, but the reasons for making it in the first place.

== Books ==
Minsker has published several books starting with Rich Boy Cries For Momma, which was featured in the art show "I Bleed Black" at the Marianne Boesky Gallery. Barstool Prophets followed in 2011 and is a fictional memoir.
