= Gennady Gorelik =

American historian

Gennady Gorelik (Russian: Геннадий Ефимович Горелик; born 1948) a physicist by education and a historian of science by occupation, has published around twenty books and numerous articles on the intellectual and social history of science, including detailed biographies of Russian physicists, Matvei Bronstein, Andrei Sakharov, and Lev Landau.

During the final seven years of the USSR’s existence, he was a member of the editorial board and contributed to the preparation of volumes for the Soviet series “Einstein Collection” [Einshteinovsky Sbornik]. In 1993 he was awarded a fellowship at the Dibner Institute for the History of Science and Technology, then was a research fellow at the Center for Philosophy and History of Science, Boston University. In 1995, he received a Guggenheim Fellowship and a MacArthur Foundation grant to write the first biography of Andrei Sakharov. His biography of Sakharov was published in Russia in 2000, and its English version was published by OUP in 2005. It explains Sakharov’s transformation from a secret father of the Soviet H-bomb to most prominent advocate of human rights in the Soviet Union (see web exhibit ‘Andrei SAKHAROV: Soviet Physics, Nuclear Weapons, and Human Rights’ at American Institute of Physics). His current major project is 'The concept of “Modern Physics”, the extended Needham question, and the inner meaning of the Scientific Revolution'.

== Selected publications ==
- Размерность пространства: историко-методологический анализ [Dimensionality of Space: historical and methodological analysis]. Moscow, 1983
- First Steps of Quantum Gravity and the Planck Values, Studies in the history of general relativity. [Einstein Studies. Vol.3]. Eds. Jean Eisenstaedt, A.J. Kox., Boston, (1992) p. 364-379
- Matvei Petrovich Bronstein and the Soviet Theoretical Physics in the Thirties (1994), with Viktor Ya. Freckle; translated by Valentina M. Levina ISBN 3-7643-2752-9
- The Top Secret life of Lev Landau. Scientific American, 1997, August
- The Metamorphosis of Andrei Sakharov. Scientific American, 1999, March
- The World of Andrei Sakharov: A Russian Physicist's Path to Freedom (2005) ISBN 0-19-515620-X
- Matvei Bronstein and quantum gravity: 70th anniversary of the unsolved problem // Physics-Uspekhi 2005, vol 48, no 10, pp. 1039–1053
- Советская жизнь Льва Ландау The Soviet Life of Lev Landau. Moscow, 2008
- The Paternity of the H-Bombs: Soviet-American Perspectives // Physics in Perspective, Vol 11, N 2 / June, 2009, p. 169-197
- A Galilean Answer to the Needham Question // Philosophia Scientiæ 2017, 21(1), 93–110
- The Concept of Modern Physics and an Extended Needham Question. Epistemology and Philosophy of Science 2023, 60 (4): 158–172.
- How a Falling Apple Could Have Helped Newton Discover Universal Gravity. The European Physical Journal H 2024, 49: 1.
- The Drama of Ideas in the History of Quantum Gravity: Niels Bohr, Lev Landau, and Matvei Bronstein. The European Physical Journal H 2024, 49: 18.

- Web exhibit "Andrei SAKHAROV: Soviet Physics, Nuclear Weapons, and Human Rights" at American Institute of Physics
