= Snail on the Slope =

1966 novel by Arkady and Boris Strugatsky

Cover of the first English edition, published by Bantam Books (1980).

Snail on the Slope (Russian - "Улитка на склоне") is a science fiction novel by Soviet authors Boris and Arkady Strugatsky. The first version of the novel was written in 1965 (during March 6 and 20), but then it was significantly rewritten. The original draft was published in 1990 under the title Disquiet.

In the spring of 1966 the so-called "Forest" part of the novel was separately published in the USSR. In 1968 the other part was published, in the journal "Baikal". A full version was published in 1972 in the Federal Republic of Germany and in the USSR in 1988. The brothers Strugatsky have described this novel as "the most perfect and the most valuable of their works".

The novel was translated into English in 1980 by Alan Myers and published in the US by Bantam Books.

== Plot summary ==
The novel consists of alternating chapters belonging to two loosely coupled parts: "Directorate" (or "Peretz", this part was published in 1968) and "Forest" (or "Candide", published in 1966).

=== Directorate ===
A linguist Peretz, having been dreaming for years of visiting the Forest, finally arrives at the Forest Directorate, an organization and a site with a distinct grim mid-20th century Soviet bureaucratic look and feel to it, perched on a high cliff amid endless Forest down below. He is unable to visit the Forest though, being refused the required permit time and again. He tries leaving the Directorate, but each time is promised the car will be made available to him "tomorrow". All he can do is watch the Forest while sitting on the cliff's edge high above it, suffer through a car driver Tousik's endless sexcapades stories, and otherwise partake in Directorate life which is full of absurdity.

The Directorate has departments of Forest Studies; Armed Forest Security; Forest Eradication; Local Forest Population Assistance; Engineering Forest Penetration; Scientific Forest Preservation; etc. The Directorate personnel voraciously consume large quantities of kefir, calculate on broken mechanical calculators, issue strange orders, and all together listen to the Director General's personalized messages each on their stationary phone, simultaneously. When a top secret robot escapes, they hunt it down with their eyes taped shut to avoid the mandatory sentence for seeing it. Most of the staff only ever visit the Forest for a short trip to the bio-station where the salary payments are made. And this is the only way Peretz can enter the Forest.

When he is evicted from his hotel in the middle of the night for the expired stay permit still not being able to obtain his leave permit, having finally spent a night with Alevtina, a female librarian who has long courted him, Peretz awakens to find himself the new Director General, and her as his personal assistant. Now at the top of this monstrosity, his every word is eagerly followed to the letter, however absurd the outcome might be.

=== Forest ===
Candide, a Directorate employee, survived a helicopter crash over the Forest years ago. Saved by the incessively chattering natives (it is hinted his head is attached to a native's body), embraced and given a wife by them, he is now known as Silent, living among them in a village, his thinking almost as blurred and foggy as theirs. The villagers lead simple lives in apparent symbiosis with the Forest, exhibiting some biological powers over it.

From time to time he is able to remember his former life, and is eager to get to the bio-station, to his own people. But the Forest is supposedly full of dangers, and Candide wants the help of some of his friends among the locals. Every day he wakes up making plans to leave the village "the day after tomorrow" and go to "the City" with them. One day his wife Nava asks him to accompany her to the nearest village on some chore, and they veer off the track by accident. Having lost their way, they go on deeper into the Forest together.

In their travels he finds out there are more Forest inhabitants other than just villagers. Part of the Forest people have progressed much further, becoming powerful and advanced, in full control of the Forest. They are exclusively female, and are based in and around the lakes that play a role somehow in their parthenogenetic asexual reproductive process.

They encounter a few of these powerful women, "sisters-in-arms", in a Forest clearing which is declared by them to be "The City" he was searching for. His wife is taken away from him. He is laughed at and chased away. His civilization is inferior, he is told, commanding only "dead matter" whereas the sisters' "commands Life".

It becomes apparent to him that the villagers are in fact forgotten leftovers from a past way of life, being now slowly discarded by the new civilization which considers sex to be an atavism, an unwelcome relic of the past. Any male is seen as nothing more than a he-goat to be disposed of, eliminated, while the villages are being "overcome" one by one unawares – turned into lakes, drowned, together with the males, while the females are taken in and converted – in a slow but unrelenting action.

Thinking this future too cruel and terrible, having his wife taken away from him by the "sisters-in-arms" who know he's an alien "from the cliffs" but still refuse to engage with him for being a male and chase him away, Candide decides to throw in his lot with the villagers. He returns home and tries to warn them but they take his stories of ruthless gendercidal lake-dwelling Amazon rulers of the Forest as laughable fairy tales.

Whatever the future must be, decides Silent, his place is here, among these kind-hearted simple-minded people, trying to protect them as much as possible for as long as he possibly can.
