= Escape Attempt =

1962 novel by Arkadi and Boris Strugatsky

- First edition (Russian)
- Author: Arkady and Boris Strugatsky
- Original title: Попытка к бегству
- Translator: Roger DeGaris
- Language: Russian
- Series: Noon Universe
- Genre: Science fiction
- Publisher: Macmillan Publishers
- Publication date: 1962
- Publication place: Soviet Union
- English publication date: 1982
- Media type: Print (Hardcover)
- ISBN: 0-02-615250-9 (Hardcover edition)
- OCLC: 8170725
- Dewey Decimal: 891.73/44 19
- LC Class: PG3476.S78835 A23 1982
- Preceded by: Noon: 22nd Century
- Followed by: Far Rainbow

Escape Attempt (Russian: Попытка к бегству, romanized: Popytka k begstvu) is a 1962 science fiction novel by Soviet writers Boris and Arkady Strugatsky, set in the Noon Universe. The English translation was published in a single volume with the other Noon universe stories Space Mowgli and The Kid from Hell.

== Plot summary ==
The novel tells a story of two young men from Earth, Anton and Vadim, who decide to go for a trip to Pandora, but are persuaded rather to travel to an uncharted planet by a mysterious man whom they know Saul Repnin. Their choice is an unnamed planet in EN-7031 system, because that's where Gorbovsky and Bader predicted that Wanderers' traces could be found.

After landing successfully on the planet (which they named Saula after Repnin), the explorers soon discover a local human civilization, as well as the predicted Wanderers' traces. The latter appear as a phenomenon later called "everlasting machines" and largely influence the entire local population. Despite the fact that it is strictly forbidden for them to initiate a contact with any human or alien civilization without an authorization from COMCON, they try to do just this - and fail, having misinterpreted the situation. What Anton and Vadim (who lived in Anarcho-communism) see as catastrophic is just a routine life in an early feudalistic society of Saula.

Saul Repnin, who, as it was later uncovered, was from 20th-century Earth (a prisoner in a Nazi concentration camp, but originally in drafts he was a Soviet political prisoner) but shifted into the future (s.c. time guest), is so shocked to see a local civilization (even though it is not the Earth's one) commit just the same cruelties he saw in his time, that it causes a severe psychological crisis in him. Anton and Vadim decide that it's the best to leave the planet immediately. On arriving back to Earth, they discover that Saul has disappeared, leaving a short note, which partly explains who he was and that he wants to go back to continue his fight against the Nazis (he is armed with a guard's machine-gun).

Saul Repnin was killed in a firefight soon after he returned to his time.

== Sources ==
- S.L.N. The Prisoner of Zhamanak (Book). Library Journal. 1982;107(10):1013. Accessed May 29, 2025. https://search.ebscohost.com/login.aspx?direct=true&db=a9h&AN=7583010&lang=ru&site=eds-live&scope=site
- Strugatsky, Arkady and Boris. Escape Attempt (Best of Soviet Science Fiction) translated by Roger DeGaris. New York: Macmillan Pub Co, May 14, 1982, 321 pp. ISBN 0-02-615250-9. LCCN: 82000029.
