= Noon: 22nd Century =

1961 novel by Arkady and Boris Strugatsky

- Cover of the Macmillan edition
- Author: Arkady and Boris Strugatsky
- Original title: Полдень. XXII век
- Translator: Patrick L. McGuire
- Language: Russian
- Series: Noon Universe
- Genre: Science fiction novel
- Publication date: 1961
- Publication place: Soviet Union
- English publication date: 1978: NA: Macmillan
- Media type: Print (hardcover)
- ISBN: 0-02-615150-2 (Hardcover edition)
- OCLC: 3966201
- Dewey Decimal: 891.7/3/44
- LC Class: PZ4.S919 No PG3476.S78835
- Followed by: Escape Attempt

Noon: 22nd Century (Russian: Полдень. XXII век, romanized: Polden'. Dvadcat' vtoroy vek) is a 1961 science fiction book by Arkady and Boris Strugatsky that was expanded in 1962 and further in 1967 and translated into English in 1978. It is sometimes considered an episodic novel, a collection of linked short stories or a fix-up since some parts had been published as independent short stories. The novel relates several stories of the 22nd century and provides the background "feeling" for the style of life which gave birth to the Noon Universe.

The title was chosen by the authors to imitate the postapocalyptic Daybreak: 2250 AD by Andre Norton. The Noon Universe has been given its name by the fans after this book.

== Plot summary ==
The book is a collection of short stories describing various aspects of human life on Earth in the 22nd century. The plots of the stories are not closely connected but feature a shared set of characters. The most commonly recurring characters are Evgeny Slavin and Sergei Kondratev, who, as a result of a lengthy journey through interstellar space at near the speed of light, are thrown over a century into the future and must reintegrate into the society of their great-grandchildren.

The book includes the following stories:

- "Night on Mars" - Two doctors walk on foot on Mars after their vehicle was lost in quicksand. They must avoid an encounter with a local wild beast and hurry to assist in the delivery of Evgeny Slavin, the first human born on Mars. (This apparently takes place in the late 20th century.)
- "Almost the Same" - Sergei Kondratev is a young man in flight school.
- "Old-timer" - The photon engine-driven spaceship Taimyr mysteriously returns to Earth after having disappeared a century earlier. Kondratev and Slavin are the only survivors.
- "The Conspirator" - The schoolchildren Pol Gnedykh, Aleksandr "Lin" Kostylin, Mikhail Sidorov and Gennady Komov plan and dream about their futures.
- "Chronicle" - A scientific report gives an analysis of the disappearance and reappearance of the Taimyr.
- "Two from the Taimyr" - Kondratev and Slavin recuperate from their wounds after the crash of the Taimyr and begin to investigate the Earth of the future to which they have returned.
- "The Moving Roads" - Kondratev explores Earth on a global system of moving roadways.
- "Cornucopia" - Slavin attempts to adjust to the domestic technology of the future.
- "Homecoming" - Kondratev encounters Leonid Gorbovsky, and decides to take a job in oceanography.
- "Langour of the Spirit" - Gnedykh and Kostylin reconnect after many years apart.
- "The Assaultmen" - Gorbovsky tours the artificial satellites of Vladislava and journeys to the surface with Sidorov and Ryu Waseda.
- "Deep Search" - Kondratev and the oceanographer Akiko Okada hunt giant squid on a deep sea expedition.
- "The Mystery of the Hind Leg" - Slavin encounters the Collector of Dispersed Data project.
- "Candles Before the Control Board" - Okada (now married to Kondratev) tries to visit her dying father, the subject of the Great Encoding.
- "Natural Science in the Spirit World" - Espers assist the Institute of Space Physics in an effort to explain the disappearance and the reappearance of Taimyr.
- "Pilgrims and Wayfarers" - Gorbovsky discusses the "Voice of the Void" and other mysteries and the philosophy of space exploration.
- "The Planet with all the Conveniences" - Komov, Waseda and others explore the planet Leonida and briefly make contact with the Leoniders.
- "Defeat" - Sidorov tests prototype colonization devices in a remote area on Earth.
- "The Meeting" - Gnedykh and Kostylin again meet after a long separation, and Gnedykh regrets his accidental killing of an alien creature who may have been sentient.
- "What You Will Be Like" - Kondratev, Slavin and Gorbovsky explore Tagora. Kondratev and Slavin discuss the progress and the stagnation of humanity over their long lifespan, and Gorbovsky tells a fantastic story about his encounter with a visitor from the future.

== Publication history ==
Noon: 22nd Century has been published several times, with different contents.

- It was first published in Russian in 1961 in the literary magazine Ural as "chapters from the novel Return," and contained only 10 of the 20 stories:
  1. Old-timer
  2. Chronicle
  3. Two from the Taimyr
  4. The Moving Roads
  5. Cornucopia
  6. Homecoming
  7. The Assaultmen
  8. The Meeting
  9. The Planet with all the Conveniences
  10. What You Will Be Like
- The next edition was published in Russian in 1962 and reprinted in 1963. This edition contained 16 of the 20 stories:
  1. Old-timer
  2. The Conspirators
  3. Chronicle
  4. Two from the Taimyr
  5. The Moving Roads
  6. Cornucopia
  7. Homecoming
  8. Langour of the Spirit
  9. The Assaultmen
  10. The Meeting
  11. Deep Search
  12. Candles Before the Control Board
  13. The Mystery of the Hind Leg
  14. Natural Science in the Spirit World
  15. The Planet with all the Conveniences
  16. What You Will Be Like
- The 1967 Russian edition was the first to include all 20 stories. All subsequent editions and translations followed the format of the 1967 edition.
