= The Waves Extinguish the Wind =

1985 novel by Boris and Arkady Strugatsky

- cover of the first English translation
- Author: Arkady and Boris Strugatsky
- Original title: Волны гасят ветер
- Translators: Antonina W. Bouis (1987); Daniels Umanovskis (2023)
- Language: Russian
- Series: Noon Universe
- Genre: Science fiction
- Publisher: Keshet Book Shop
- Publication date: 1986
- Publication place: Soviet Union
- Media type: Print
- OCLC: 15174231
- Preceded by: Beetle in the Anthill

The Waves Extinguish the Wind (Russian: Волны гасят ветер, romanized: Volny gasiat veter; also translated as The Time Wanderers) is a 1985 science fiction novel by Soviet writers Boris and Arkady Strugatsky, set in the Noon Universe. The book is narrated by Maxim Kammerer, and tells the story of The Great Revelation.

== Plot summary ==
The principal characters are Maxim Kammerer and Toivo Glumov, both working for an organization which investigates "Unexplained Events" (UEs). Their investigation of a series of events leads them to believe that they are witnesses to the "progressorship" intervention by the precursor civilization of the Wanderers. This idea was discredited earlier, up to the level of mockery, therefore their research was met with distrust.

After much investigation, the UEs are discovered to be the work of a secret society called the Ludens. They claim to have chosen this name for themselves as a derivative of the Russian word lyudi "humans", "people" with several semi-jocular allusions such as the popular Latin phrase Homo Ludens "the Playing Man" and an anagram of the Russian word nelyudi "inhuman people" (as they believe they are regarded by some "ordinary" humans). The Ludens are born human, but possess latent mental powers far beyond those of normal humans. They view themselves as a distinct species, and claim to have "different interests" from humanity at large, in some instances claiming to be above traditional human morality. The Ludens routinely conduct experiments on humans and alter their minds in order to further their own means.

Kammerer and Glumov's investigation unmasks the Ludens, and they are made public in what would later become known as "The Great Revelation". It turns out that Glumov possesses this capacity, and must now decide whether or not to become a Luden himself. He at first states that to join the Ludens would be a betrayal of his family, friends, and human civilization. But he decides to try it out, if only to serve as Humanity's "ambassador" with them. Soon all contacts with Glumov are lost, Kammerer hypothesizing that he "just forgot about us now". Indeed, the story is told as Kammerer's memoir, his sole intent in writing it being to clear up the story of Glumov: another source (in the fictional setting) had implied that Glumov was in the Luden group all along.

== English translations ==
- Strugatsky, Arkady and Boris. The Time Wanderers translated by Antonina W. Bouis. New York: Richardson & Steirman, March 18, 1987, 213 pp. ISBN 0-931933-31-5.
- Strugatsky, Arkady and Boris. The Waves Extinguish the Wind translated by Daniels Umanovskis. Chicago: Chicago Review Press, April 18, 2023, 178 pp. ISBN 9781641606264.

== See also ==
- Hermann Hesse's The Glass Bead Game ("Magister Ludi")
