= Comments on the Past =

Memoir by Boris Strugatsky

Comments on the Past (Russian: Комментарии к пройденному) (Note: The title is ambiguous: The Russian word "пройденный" may mean "<the way that was> passed", as well as the "studied material".) is the memoir by the Russian science fiction writer Boris Strugatsky devoted to the histories of creation of the works of Strugatsky brothers. It is available online at the official Strugatskys' website. Its sections follow the chronology and titled by the major works of the corresponding period. In vol. 31 (2020) of Strugatskys' Complete Works the memoir is structured as follows:

- 1955—1959 гг.: «Страна багровых туч»; «Путь на Амальтею»; рассказы.
- 1960—1962 гг.: «Возвращение. Полдень, XXII век»; «Стажёры».
- 1961—1963 гг.: «Попытка к бегству»; «Далекая Радуга»; «Трудно быть богом»; «Понедельник начинается в субботу».
- 1964—1966 гг.: «Хищные вещи века»; «Улитка на склоне»; «Второе нашествие марсиан».
- 1967—1968 гг.: «Сказка о Тройке»; «Обитаемый остров».
- 1969—1973 гг.: «Отель „У погибшего альпиниста“»; «Малыш»; «Пикник на обочине»; «Парень из преисподней».
- 1973—1978 гг.: «За миллиард лет до конца света»; «Град обреченный»; «Повесть о дружбе и недружбе».
- 1979—1984 гг.: «Жук в муравейнике»; «Хромая судьба»; «Волны гасят ветер».
- 1985—1990 гг.: «Отягощённые злом»; «Жиды города Питера, или Невесёлые беседы при свечах»; киносценарии.

Initially they were written during 1997–1998 as a set of prefaces for a collection of Strugatskys' works and in 2003 they were published as a separate book in a slightly censored form. Later it was published unabridged.
