= The Ugly Swans =

1968 novel by Arkady and Boris Strugatsky

- Cover from MacMillan edition
- Author: Arkady and Boris Strugatsky
- Original title: Гадкие лебеди
- Translator: Alice Stone Nakhimovsky and Alexander Nakhimovsky
- Language: Russian
- Genre: Science fiction
- Publisher: Macmillan in U.S., unpublished in USSR until 1987
- Publication date: in samizdat since 1968
- Publication place: Soviet Union
- English publication date: 1979 1st in U.S.
- Media type: Print (Hardcover)
- ISBN: 0-02-615190-1 (US edition)
- OCLC: 4593633
- Dewey Decimal: 891.7/3/44
- LC Class: PZ4.S919 Ug 1979 PG3476.S78835

The Ugly Swans (Russian: Гадкие лебеди) is a science fiction novel by Soviet writers Arkady and Boris Strugatsky. In the USSR, it was published in 1987, in the Latvian magazine Daugava, with the title "The Time of Rains" (Russian: Время дождей).

Initially, the novel was written in 1966-1967 to be published in the Soviet literary magazine Molodaya Gvardiya, but the publication was rejected by censor due to prominent political and free-thought overtones in the novel. It circulated in samizdat, and in 1972 was published without the authors' permission abroad, in the Federal Republic of Germany.

In 2006, a loose film adaptation of the novel was made by Konstantin Lopushansky.

== Plot summary ==
The action takes place in an uncertain mildly-authoritarian country, in an unnamed town. Famous writer Victor Banev, a middle-aged heavy drinker, comes from the capital city to the town of his childhood where the rain never stops.

Banev finds himself in the middle of strange events linked to slimies or four-eyes - strange leper people suffering from disfiguring "yellow leprosy" manifesting itself as yellow circles around the eyes. These slimies live in a former leper colony. The town's adult population is terrified by their existence, considering them to be the cause of all the bad and odd things in the town. Nevertheless, the town's teenagers simply adore slimies, that including Banev's daughter Irma. A boy named Bol-Kunats, Irma's friend, invites the writer to a meeting with the town school's students. Banev is deeply shocked by teenagers' high intelligence and disullusioned point of view. They appear as superhuman geniuses despising the dirty and corrupt human world and having no pity for the adults.

Banev makes acquaintance with Diana, and discusses slimies in dinner conversations with the chief doctor of the leprosarium Yul Golem, a drunken artist Ram Quadriga and sanitary inspector Pavor Summan. Banev dislikes the mayor, a patron of local fascist thugs, and also the military who guard the slimies. Golem mentions that the genetic disease of slimies represents the future of humanity, a new genetic type of people, intellectually and morally superior to ordinary people.

Events begin to unfold dramatically. Banev discovers that Pavor Summan works for counterintelligence, and, learning he's guilty of kidnapping and killing of a slimy, notifies the military out of spite. The town's children leave their parents' homes and move into the leper colony. Adults of the town are gripped with a sudden overpowering feeling of terror, and exodus begins. As soon as all the residents have left town, the rain stops. Golem leaves the last. Banev and Diana enter the city, now disappearing under the rays of Sun. They see Irma and Bol-Kunats all grown up in a day and happy, and Banev's saying to himself: "All this is nice and fine, but I mustn't forget to return."

== Shared ideas ==
The novel shares some ideas with later works like The Second Invasion from Mars, Roadside Picnic (a non-standard alien invasion), and The Time Wanderers.

== Cultural references ==
- The prototype of Victor Banev is, according to Boris Strugatsky, "a generalized image of the Bard." Among those included in this image, Strugatsky named Alexander Galich, Yuliy Kim, Bulat Okudzhava and Vladimir Vysotsky. With the permission of Vladimir Vysotsky, a slightly modified version of his song "I'm fed up to the neck, chin up .... " is used in the story.
- Boris Strugatsky explained that the original story ended with the Golem's words, "... poor beautiful duckling", and that the ending with a happy ending, writers came up with later, while trying to prepare the story for publication.
- In an off-line interview, Boris Strugatsky confirmed that slimies came from the future. But this future is a terrible thing and they returned to the past, trying to change it. The success of the operation changed the future and destroyed slimies.
- The names of many characters in the story are borrowed from the classical mythologies and reflect the essence of their carriers. For example:
  - Pavor Summan, "medical officer", but actually a counter-intelligence officer
  - Pavor - Greek god of fear, moon god of war Mars; Summan - Roman god of nocturnal lightning.
  - Flamen Juventa, the nephew of the chief of police, "a member of the Legion of liberty", "the young Goliath in a sports jacket, sparkling with numerous logos, our simple home Sturmführer, faithful to support the nation with a rubber truncheon in his back pocket, storm Left, right and moderates
  - Flamen - priests in ancient Rome. Juventas - the Roman goddess of youth.
  - Yule Golem - head doctor leprosarium, playing the role of mediator between slimies and the outside world
  - Golem - from Jewish mythology, artificial person, created out of clay and execute the instructions of its creator.

== See also ==
- The Ugly Duckling
