= Space Apprentice =

1962 novel by Arkady and Boris Strugatsky

- Author: Arkady and Boris Strugatsky
- Original title: Стажёры
- Translator: Antonina W. Bouis
- Language: Russian
- Genre: Science fiction novel
- Publisher: Macmillan Publishers
- Publication date: 1962
- Publication place: Soviet Union
- English publication date: 1981
- Media type: Print (Hardback)
- ISBN: 0-02-615220-7
- OCLC: 7281893
- Dewey Decimal: 891.73/44 19
- LC Class: PG3476.S78835 S6
- Preceded by: The Way to Amalthea

Space Apprentice, also known as Probationers (Russian: Стажёры, romanized: Stazhyory), is a science fiction novel by the Soviet writers Arkady and Boris Strugatsky. Originally published in 1962, it is a space travel novel set after The Land of Crimson Clouds and "Destination Amalthea" and hundreds of years before the Noon Universe novels.

This is the Strugatsky brothers' final hard science fiction novel, and it gives reasons for their decision to move into social science fiction instead.

== Plot summary ==
The novel's main character is Yuri Borodin, a young space welder. His mother was sick and Yuri missed the spaceship that was to transport him to his new work site. He gets a ride to his destination on a ship that is piloted by some of the characters of The Land of Crimson Clouds.

When the novel starts, Yurkovsky and Bykov Sr. say goodbye to Grisha Bykov, who Bykov's son, and Dauge and leave on a mission from the international spaceport Mirza-Charle. Meanwhile, Yuri Borodin is also in the spaceport and tries to find a ride. Spaceport authorities direct him to the port director, but he is currently out of town. Disappointed, Yuri wanders into a capitalist-run bar in which the owner/bartender is engaged in an ideological debate with a Russian communist. Yuri befriends the Russian, Ivan Zhilin, and tells him of his problems. Ivan suggests Yuri to go to the spaceport hotel in the evening and try to convince the astronauts who stay there to take him along. Yuri does so and meets Bykov and Yurkovsky. Yurkovsky currently serves as a Chief Inspector and plans to make a tour of several planets and planetoids. Bykov is piloting his ship. They agree to give Yuri a ride.

Their first stop is Mars. The Earth (mostly-Russian) colonists there are battling an alien life form the giant slug (the Flying Martian Leech aka sora-tobu hiru). As the colonists are planning a large-scale slug hunt, they realize that some of the buildings in the area are not human-made. Since the buildings look so much like the simple prefabricated structures set up by the colonists, everyone just assumed that they had been left there by previous expeditions. Some colonists lament the lack of initiative that has descended over the colony in recent years, and Yurkovsky agrees. The raid on slugs, which is carried out in part using the weapons brought by Yurkovsky, is reasonably successful, and the colonists cheer up.

On the way to the research space station Eunomia, the spaceship crew runs an emergency drill, and Yuri, while stressed and confused, holds up to the pressure.

The station was orbiting the Sun with parameters of 15 Eunomia, a very large asteroid that nearly completely disappeared after a few years of research. Yurkovsky and Yuri witness a scheduled experiment on propagation of gravitational waves that are created by annihilating a chunk of the asteroid the size of Mount Everest.

Many physicists want to work on Eunomia because of the unique research opportunities that it provides. The station is severely overcrowded, but the scientists gladly put up with the inconveniences such as food shortages or having to sleep in an elevator. Yurkovsky disapproves but gives a part of his own food supply to the hungry physicists. He says that such scientists should be a role model for Yuri.

Planetoid Bamberga has deposits of precious space pearls. Capitalists run a mine on Bamberga. In the drive to maximize profits, the miners work more than six-hour-a-day despite health risks from the high levels of radiation in the mine. That causes illness and premature death. The local safety inspector, a Hungarian communist, protests, but he is ignored and harassed. After his arrival, Yurkovsky arrests the mine's director on multiple offences including smuggling liquor and prostitutes, with their possible subsequent killing. He tells the workers to elect a replacement and reminds them that the mining license is given only temporarily and may be revoked at any time. The miners emphatically protest. Despaired, Yurkovsky leaves the meeting with the miners. However, one of the miners returns the string of space pearls that Yurkovsky accidentally left behind. The returned pearls are worth a large sum of money, and Yurkovsky thinks that there is still hope for the miners.

Back on the spaceship, Yuri and Zhilin watch an action film about the heroes of space exploration, and the young Yuri becomes excited. Zhilin explains the film oversimplifies the picture and that life is much more complicated and much less glamorous than it is portrayed. He alludes to the events in The Land of Crimson Clouds.

The next stop of the tour is Diona space observatory, where the researchers produce valuable scientific contributions. However, personal relationships deteriorate. Yuri gets into a fight with one of the young researchers. It turns out that two of the senior scientists were spreading rumors about the others to further their scientific careers. Yurkovsky orders them back to Earth and even suggests one of them to kill himself. He says that these two men managed to deceive the rest of the crew so successfully because many people in communist society are not accustomed to others blatantly lying to them, and they are too proud to try to figure out the truth for themselves.

Yurkovsky spaceship approaches Saturn and stops at Ring One space station. From there, Yuri is supposed to go to Ring Two, his worksite. Yurkovsky is getting too old for space travel. In all likelihood, the trip is the last of his space flights. He did much research on the rings of Saturn and now wants to see them close. The same is true for his navigator, Krutikov. Yurkovsky and Krutikov take a rocket to fly near the rings. As they approach the rings, Yurkovsky notices an unusual (and seemingly artificial) rock formation and urges Krutikov to fly closer despite the danger of a meteorite collision. Bykov orders them over the radio to stop. However, anxious to find out more about the discovery, Yurkovsky attacks Krutikov and breaks the radio. Krutikov yields and descends to the rock formation. Bykov is speeding toward them on a spaceship that is supposed to leave for Ring Two space station. Yuri is on board.

Yurkovsky and Krutikov's rockets gets hit with a meteorite, and they die. Yuri is injured and hospitalized.

He ponders how people will think of the new discovery as very important, but they will not remember the people who made it. He wishes that no discovery were made and that both people were still alive.

Bykov and Zhilin return to Earth and meet a sick Dauge. He tells Bykov that a new expedition to planet Transpluton, also known as Cerberus, is planned and that he is offered to lead it. Bykov agrees apathetically. Zhilin, however, thinks that he would prefer to stay on Earth because "what is most important shall always remain on Earth."
