= Dead Mountaineer's Inn =

1970 novel by Arkady and Boris Strugatsky

- 2015 Melville House Neversink Library English translation
- Author: Boris and Arkady Strugatsky
- Language: Russian
- Genre: Science Fiction
- Publication place: Soviet Union

The Dead Mountaineer's Inn (Russian: Отель «У Погибшего Альпиниста», lit. 'Hotel "By the Dead Mountaineer"', The Dead Mountaineer's Hotel) is a 1970 Soviet science fiction novel written by brothers Arkady and Boris Strugatsky. In 2015, Melville House published an English translation by Josh Billings as part of their Neversink Library collection. The novel heavily incorporates elements of detective fiction as it follows Inspector Peter Glebsky as he attempts to solve a classic locked-room mystery. However, the novel subverts common mystery novel tropes, and flouts the second of Ronald Knox's "Ten Commandments" of the detective genre: "All supernatural or preternatural agencies are ruled out as a matter of course."

The novel has been adapted for the screen in 1979 and as a video game in 2007. It was translated into a number of languages. The English translation as The Dead Mountaneer's Inn by Josh Billings was published in 2015.

== Plot summary ==
The novel begins when Inspector Peter Glebsky, eager to get away from work and family life, takes a two-week vacation to the titular hotel. He is greeted by the hotel's owner Alek Snevar, who tells Glebsky the story of the dead mountaineer. After settling in, Glebsky meets some of the hotel's other guests. First, he meets Mr. du Barnstoker, a famous magician who is accompanied by his late brother's child Brun, an adolescent of indeterminate sex, and the physicist Simon Simone. Over a meal and conversation about the theoretical possibility of alien visitation, Glebsky learns that the guests have been victim to a number of pranks. The conversation is brought to a halt by the arrival of two more guests, the perpetually drunk Mr. Moses and his beautiful wife. The next day brings more guests: Olaf Andvarafors and Hinkus. The day also brings more pranks, such as a mysterious note that indicates that the sickly Hinkus is actually a gangster intent on the murder of one of the inn's guests. Glebsky investigates Hinkus' room and finds Mr. Moses' gold watch in a suspicious trunk, but a later conversation with Hinkus indicates that those items may have been planted.

That night, an avalanche blocks the entrance to the valley, cutting the guests off from the nearest town. Shortly afterward a strange man arrives at the door and asks for Olaf before fainting. After installing the stranger in a vacant room, they find Olaf Andvarafors dead in his room, his door locked from the inside. His hand is reaching toward a suitcase containing a mysterious device.

Glebsky then begins an investigation and finds Hinkus tied up under a table. Hinkus refuses to identify his attacker. A little later, Du Barnstoker admits to being responsible for a large number of the pranks, although he denies having anything to do with the note concerning Hinkus. Glebsky then runs into Simone. When questioned, Simone falls apart and denies having killed Mrs. Moses, alerting Glebsky to a possible second murder. Glebsky takes Simone to Mrs. Moses' room, where they find her alive, reading a book. When questioned, Simone also admits to some pranks. After Simone, Glebsky questions each of the inn's guests, as well as Snevar. Snevar reveals that, while checking in the Moses', he discovered a mannequin of Mrs. Moses in their room. Glebsky infers that this mannequin must be what Simone encountered when he thought he found Mrs. Moses dead.

Glebsky begins a search of the inn, and, as he does so, the stranger wakes up. He claims that he is named Luarvik L. Luarvik, and demands to see Olaf, to confirm that he is dead. After, he demands to have Olaf's suitcase containing the strange device. He insists that Olaf was not murdered, but instead was killed by the mysterious device, and insists he be allowed to take it away to disarm it. He attempts unsuccessfully to bribe Glebsky to allow him to do this.

Hinkus then admits to Glebsky that he is, in fact, a gangster. He was sent to the inn by his boss, "Champion," in order to track down a man known as "Beelzebub", and his female accomplice. He explains that Beelzebub is a man of extraordinary power, and that his accomplice possesses superhuman strength. After ascertaining that they must be aliens from another planet, Champion blackmailed them to aid his gang in a couple of high-profile robberies, after which Beelzebub ran away. Hinkus says that he had requested Champion's presence at the inn, but that the avalanche prevented Champion from getting there. He expects his boss to commandeer a plane from a local airfield, and kill everyone at the inn.

Simone, meanwhile, has been conducting his own investigation. He speaks to Mr. Moses and Luarvik L. Luarvik and they reveal that they are aliens. The device in Olaf's possession is an "accumulator," which Olaf and Mrs. Moses, both of whom are robots, rely on for power. Moses speaks to Glebsky and says that he is an observer for an alien race. He reveals that he wrote the note about Hinkus, and asks that the device be delivered to him so that he and Luarvik can escape before Champion shows up. Glebsky, still incredulous, refuses, and so Snevar and Simone restrain him and take the device by force. After reviving Olaf, Luarvik and the Moses' attempt a getaway, but are met by a helicopter piloted by Champion and are gunned down.

== Background ==
The Dead Mountaineer’s Inn is the 17th novel by Boris and Arkady Strugatsky. It was originally published in 1970 as a serial in Юность (Yunost, transl. Youth) in Russian, under the title Отель «У Погибшего Альпиниста». The book was translated into English in 2015 by Josh Billings. It was published by Melville Publishing House as part of their Neversink Library collection. When the book was initially published, the Strugatskys had fallen from favor with Soviet publishers, and most of their work was being serialized in magazines, rather than published by major houses. The Dead Mountaineer's Hotel, however, being for the most part free of political commentary, reached publication with only minor adjustments made by censors of the time. The first publication saw the novel's gangsters transformed into neo-Nazis, and a 1983 edition saw several cuts and edits made in a children's edition, in an effort to coordinate with an anti-alcoholism campaign.

In his 1999 memoir Comments on the Past (Комментарии к пройденному) Boris Strugatsky writes that for a long time they mulled over idea to write a typical fanciful commercial mystery novel, but then decided to make a literary experiment: instead of a clever solution of the mystery, the novel would make a somersault into a completely different story. However they concluded that the experiment failed, despite the fact that result was solid readable stuff.

== Adaptations ==
The novel was adapted in Poland under the title Hotel pod poległym alpinistą in 1976, as a TV film directed by Stanisław Wohl, and in 1993, as a TV film directed by Michał Kwieciński

It was adapted into the Soviet Estonian film "Hukkunud Alpinisti" hotell, directed by Grigori Kromanov at Tallinnfilm in 1979. The Strugatsky brothers wrote the screenplay themselves, although some of their initial attempts were turned down by directors.

It was adapted into a point and click adventure game Dead Mountaineer's Hotel by the Ukrainian company Electronic Paradise. It was released in the Russian language by the Russian software company Akella in 2007 and for North America and Western Europe by Lighthouse Interactive in 2009.

As of 2026, a Russian film with the same name is in the works since 2023.
