= Zone (2012 film) =

- Original Finnish poster
- Directed by: Esa Luttinen
- Written by: Esa Luttinen
- Based on: Roadside Picnic by Arkady and Boris Strugatsky
- Produced by: Esa Luttinen; Mika Luttinen; Timo Piiri
- Starring: Sami Tikkanen; Timo Piiri; Sami Sundman; Esa Luttinen
- Cinematography: Timo Piiri
- Edited by: Esa Luttinen; Timo Piiri; Sami Sundman
- Music by: Sami Sundman
- Production companies: Marmont Entertainment; Pilman Radiant Pictures
- Release date: 29 August 2012; (internet)
- Running time: 111 minutes
- Country: Finland
- Language: Finnish
- Budget: €3,000

Zone (Finnish: Vyöhyke) is a 2012 Finnish low-budget independent science fiction film directed by Esa Luttinen. It is based on the 1972 novel Roadside Picnic by Arkady and Boris Strugatsky.

The film premiered in March 2012 at the film festival held in Karis, Finland.

== Plot summary ==
On April 27, 1986, an unidentified flying object crashed to the ground south of the village of Linnakallio, Finland, creating a deadly zone of over a thousand square kilometers, where the laws of nature have been distorted. This was one of six zones that were created in one day in the northern Eurasia and North America. These zones later came to be called the "Zones". Attempts by the defense forces and authorities to evacuate the zone failed completely. Hundreds of soldiers and civilians died or disappeared without a trace, and the people who lived in the zone were never found. The soldiers completely isolated the zone from the outside world. With fences, watchtowers and 24-hour security, the soldiers effectively prevented anyone from entering or leaving the zone—or so they thought. A new type of crime emerged around the zones, the "Stalkers". These individuals risk their lives to protect themselves from military bullets and the dangers of the Zone in search of "Artifacts", strange objects found in the Zone that are not of this world. Due to their properties that defy the laws of physics, the artifacts are sought after on the black market, and are purchased by research institutions, weapons manufacturers, and even private collectors around the world.

== Cast ==
- Sami Tikkanen as Rajala
- Timo Piiri as Lammi
- Sami Sundman as Pesonen
- Esa Luttinen as Kortelainen
- Immo Piippo as Lindman
- Jani Karttunen as Galitski
- Mika Luttinen as Grönholm
- Merja Hellbom as Kuusiluoma
- Arttu Wiskari as Jansson

== See also ==
- List of Finnish films of the 2010s
- Stalker (1979 film)
