= 3054 Strugatskia =

Asteroid

Discovery
- Discovered by: N. Chernykh
- Discovery site: Crimean Astrophysical Obs.
- Discovery date: 11 September 1977

Designations
- Named after: Arkady and Boris Strugatsky (Russian sci-fi authors)
- Alternative designations: 1977 RE_{7} · 1928 UC; 1959 JQ · 1960 OE; 1961 VG
- Minor planet category: main-belt · (outer); Themis

Orbital characteristics
- Epoch 23 March 2018 (JD 2458200.5)
- Uncertainty parameter 0
- Observation arc: 89.36 yr (32,640 d)
- Aphelion: 3.7446 AU
- Perihelion: 2.4399 AU
- Semi-major axis: 3.0923 AU
- Eccentricity: 0.2110
- Orbital period (sidereal): 5.44 yr (1,986 d)
- Mean anomaly: 176.03°
- Mean motion: 0° 10^{m} 52.68^{s} / day
- Inclination: 2.0802°
- Longitude of ascending node: 146.26°
- Argument of perihelion: 187.49°

Physical characteristics
- Mean diameter: 26.921±0.205 km
- Geometric albedo: 0.056±0.009
- Absolute magnitude (H): 11.7

3054 Strugatskia, provisional designation 1977 RE_{7}, is a dark Themistian asteroid from the outer regions of the asteroid belt, approximately 27 kilometers (17 miles) in diameter. It was discovered on 11 September 1977, by Soviet–Russian astronomer Nikolai Chernykh at the Crimean Astrophysical Observatory in Nauchnij, on the Crimean peninsula. The asteroid was named after the brothers Arkady and Boris Strugatsky, two Russian science fiction authors.

== Orbit and classification ==
Strugatskia is a Themistian asteroid that belongs to the Themis family (602), a very large family of carbonaceous asteroids, named after 24 Themis. It orbits the Sun in the outer asteroid belt at a distance of 2.4–3.7 AU once every 5 years and 5 months (1,986 days; semi-major axis of 3.09 AU). Its orbit has an eccentricity of 0.21 and an inclination of 2° with respect to the ecliptic.

The asteroid was first observed as 1928 UC at Heidelberg Observatory in October 1928. The body's observation arc begins at Goethe Link Observatory in May 1959, more than 18 years prior to its official discovery observation at Nauchnij.

== Physical characteristics ==
Although the asteroid's spectral type is unknown, its albedo indicates a carbonaceous composition, which agrees with C-type classification for the Themistian asteroids.

=== Rotation period ===
As of 2018, no rotational lightcurve of Strugatskia has been obtained from photometric observations. The body's rotation period, pole and shape remain unknown.

=== Diameter and albedo ===
According to the survey carried out by the NEOWISE mission of NASA's Wide-field Infrared Survey Explorer, Strugatskia measures 26.921 kilometers in diameter and its surface has an albedo of 0.056, typical for carbonaceous asteroids.

== Naming ==
This minor planet was named after the brothers Arkady Strugatsky (1925–1991) and Boris Strugatsky (1933–2012), two Russian science fiction authors who often worked in collaboration. The official naming citation was published by the Minor Planet Center on 2 July 1985 (M.P.C. 9771).
