= Devil Amongst People =

1991 novel by Arkadiy Natanovitsj Stroegatskiy

- Author: Arkady Strugatsky
- Original title: Дьявол среди людей
- Language: Russian
- Genre: Science fiction
- Publication date: 1991

Devil Amongst People (Дьявол среди людей) is a 1991 Russian science fiction novel written by Arkady Strugatsky alone and published under the pseudonym S. Yaroslavtsev. It is about "the time which created monsters".

The hero of the novel, Kim Voloshin, has passed through all horrors of the Soviet time (lost his family during the war, suffered in the gulag, was a liquidator of the Chernobyl disaster) and gained a supernatural ability to kill anyone who tried to hurt him.
