= Arkady and Boris Strugatsky =

Soviet and Russian brothers, writer duo

- The brothers in the 1980s
- Born: Arkady Natanovich Strugatsky (Russian: Аркадий Натанович Стругацкий): 28 August 1925; Batumi, Georgian SSR, Soviet Union; Boris Natanovich Strugatsky (Russian: Борис Натанович Стругацкий): 14 April 1933; Leningrad, Russian SFSR, Soviet Union
- Died: Arkady: 12 October 1991 (aged 66); Moscow, Russian SFSR, Soviet Union; Boris: 19 November 2012 (aged 79); Saint Petersburg, Russia
- Occupation: Writers
- Writing career
- Genres: Science fiction; philosophical fiction; absurdist fiction
- Notable awards: Aelita Prize 1981

The brothers Arkady Strugatsky (28 August 1925 – 12 October 1991) and Boris Strugatsky (14 April 1933 – 19 November 2012) were Soviet and Russian science-fiction authors who collaborated through most of their careers.

In the second half of the 1950s, military translator A. N. Strugatsky, with the assistance of journalist Lev Petrov and writer and intelligence officer Roman Kim, published the documentary novella Ashes of Bikini (journal versions in 1956 and 1957, book edition in 1958) and secured a position as an editor at Goslitizdat. B. N. Strugatsky, who worked at the Pulkovo Observatory, also harbored literary ambitions; according to legend, the brothers decided to write together on a bet. Between 1957 and 1959, Arkady and Boris Strugatsky wrote the novella The Land of Crimson Clouds and several short stories, which immediately attracted attention. In 1964, the Strugatskys were admitted to the Union of Writers of the RSFSR. After years of experimentation, they developed a working method that involved not only joint discussion of ideas but also the oral rehearsal of every sentence. The writing process followed a detailed plan, which was developed in advance and discussed multiple times.

Starting with works in the synthetic genre of adventure and scientific-technical fiction, the Strugatskys quickly transitioned to social prognostics and modeling in the form of "realistic fiction," with ideological content wrapped in a gripping plot. Most of their books explore the establishment of contact with alien intelligence, the question of the permissibility and justification of intervention or non-intervention in the natural evolution of civilizations of any type, and the study of various forms of utopia and dystopia.

Significant attention in their work was devoted to the problem of the ideologization and de-ideologization of society and the role of culture in the state. In the first half of the 1960s, the Strugatskys created a unified fictional universe, conventionally called the Noon Universe, which serves as the setting for nearly a dozen novellas. The image of communism they constructed evolved toward permanent geopolitical and cosmic expansion and associated mechanisms of social control. Their exploration of various forms of utopia led the Strugatskys (starting with The Far Rainbow) to the conviction that humanity would inevitably split into unequal strata, not all of whose members are suitable or worthy of entering a bright future. The prospect of creating a biological civilization that radically reconstructs human nature and opposes technical culture also concerned the co-authors. From the 1980s, B. N. Strugatsky began to reassess their joint creative path in the context of liberalism and dissidence.

Having achieved significant fame in the 1960s, the Strugatskys faced persecution of philosophical fiction in the USSR by the Department of Agitation and Propaganda of the Central Committee of the CPSU and the leadership of the All-Union Leninist Communist Youth League. In the 1970s and the first half of the 1980s, the number of publications and reprints decreased, and several lengthy texts gained semi-banned status, circulating in samizdat (e.g., The Ugly Swans). Based on the novella Roadside Picnic, which had no book editions at the time, the Strugatskys wrote the screenplay for A. Tarkovsky's film Stalker (1979).

In the 1980s, the Strugatskys became some of the most published Soviet writers, a symbol of independent thought, and were awarded the RSFSR State Prize named after M. Gorky (1986). Yet, the Strugatskys took Marxism seriously and were hardly dissidents. While Arkady insisted in the mid-1980s that he had never doubted the truthfulness of communist ideals (“I have imbibed them from my childhood”), Boris wrote in 1994 that humanity had not invented anything “more radiant, just and attractive” than communism.

Between 1991 and 1994, the publishing house Tekst released the first collected works of the Strugatskys. In the 1990s, numerous editions were published, including the series Worlds of the Strugatsky Brothers. A group of Strugatsky researchers (the so-called "Ludeny Group") published an 11-volume collected works based on archival texts between 2001 and 2003, and a complete 33-volume collected works between 2015 and 2022.

The Strugatskys' work significantly influenced the spread of dissent among the Soviet intelligentsia in the 1970s and 1980s, and was studied by literary scholars, social philosophers, and political scientists due to its interest in ideological and literary constructs.

== Life and work ==
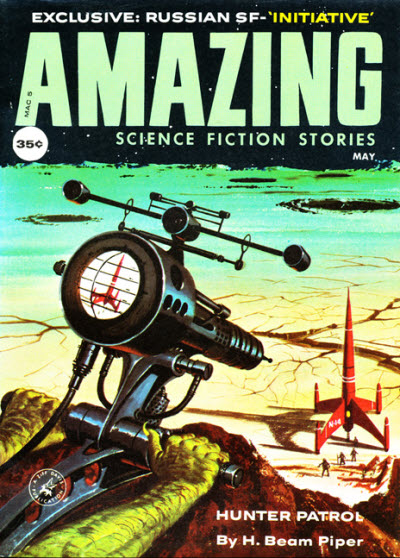
A translated Strugatsky story appeared in Amazing Stories in 1959

The Strugatsky brothers (братья Стругацкие or simply Стругацкие) were born to Natan Strugatsky, an art critic, and his wife, a teacher. Their father was Jewish and their mother was Russian Orthodox. Their early work was influenced by Ivan Yefremov and Stanisław Lem. Later they went on to develop their own, unique style of science fiction writing that emerged from the period of Soviet rationalism in Soviet literature and evolved into novels interpreted as works of social criticism.

Their best-known novel, Piknik na obochine, has been translated into English as Roadside Picnic. Andrei Tarkovsky adapted the novel for the screen as Stalker (1979).

Algis Budrys compared their An Emergency Case and Arkady's Wanderers and Travellers to the work of Eando Binder.

In 1991, Text Publishers brought out the collected works by Arkady and Boris Strugatsky.

== Arkady ==
Arkady Strugatsky was born 25 August 1925 in Batumi; the family later moved to Leningrad. In January 1942, Arkady and his father were evacuated from the Siege of Leningrad, but Arkady was the only survivor in his train car; his father died upon reaching Vologda. Arkady was drafted into the Soviet army in 1943. He trained first at the artillery school in Aktyubinsk and later at the Military Institute of Foreign Languages in Moscow, from which he graduated in 1949 as an interpreter of English and Japanese. He worked as a teacher and interpreter for the military until 1955. In 1955, he began working as an editor and writer. In 1958, he began collaborating with his brother Boris, a collaboration that lasted until Arkady's death on 12 October 1991. Arkady Strugatsky became a member of the Union of Soviet Writers in 1964. In addition to his own writing, he translated Japanese short stories and novels, as well as some English works with his brother.

== Boris ==
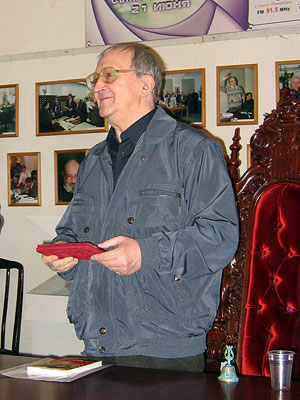
Boris Strugatsky in 2006

Born 14 April 1933, Boris Strugatsky remained in Leningrad with his mother during the siege of the city during World War II. He graduated from high school in 1950 and applied to the physics department at Leningrad State University, but studied astronomy instead. After graduating in 1955, he worked as an astronomer and computer engineer at the Pulkovo Observatory. In 1960 he participated in a geodetic and astronomical expedition in the Caucasus. Boris Strugatsky became a member of the writers' union of the USSR in 1964. In 1966, he became a full-time writer. From 1972 he acted as the head of the Leningrad seminar of young speculative fiction writers, which subsequently became known as the "Boris Strugatsky Seminar". He established the "Bronze Snail" literary prize. He was an agnostic. After the death of his brother, he published two more novels under a pseudonym. Boris Strugatsky died in Saint Petersburg on 19 November 2012.

== Artistic origins ==
=== Cultural and socio-political environment of the Strugatsky Brothers' formation ===
A defining feature of the Strugatsky Brothers' work is its collaborative nature. (Note: Biographers and critics have repeatedly noted the difference in quality between the Strugatskys' literary works created in various authorship formats. Ant Skalandis, characterizing the debut novella in three stories From the inside (1960), said it was written by three different people: the first chapter by Arkady Strugatsky, the second by Boris Strugatsky, and the third by "a very young, very inexperienced writer" — the Strugatsky Brothers. Boris Mezhyev also stated: "Everything written by S. Yaroslavtsev (i.e., Arkady Natanovich alone) was, on the whole, an order of magnitude lower than the work of ABS, while what was written by S. Vititsky (i.e., Boris Natanovich alone) was no weaker than the best works of the great brothers. Ant Skalandis described the individual works of A. N. and B. N. Strugatsky in similar terms.) Between 1941 and 1956, Arkady and Boris Strugatsky lived apart, not united by professional activities or daily life; their communication was primarily in written form. The circumstances shaping the personalities of the two brothers, as well as their socio-political and aesthetic views, were entirely different. (Note: Boris Strugatsky also categorically stated that the eventful side of their biography with his brother concluded in 1956.The realization of a unified writerly persona prompted the brothers to calculate its "birth date," equidistant from 1925 and 1933; they arrived at 1929.) In particular, despite a relatively small age difference (about eight years), Arkady and Boris belonged to different generations in terms of worldview: in 1941, the elder brother was 16 years old, and his childhood coincided with an era "for which it was customary to thank to Comrade Stalin. Without any irony or reservations in this case: a peaceful, calm life in a good family, among kind friends, in a wonderful city, in a beloved country that both adults and children genuinely took pride in". Boris Strugatsky's formative years coincided with the war, the blockade, and evacuation, which predetermined negative memories of his childhood and youth and a skeptical attitude toward the country and its political system.

The socio-political preferences of the Strugatsky Brothers were shaped in entirely different environments. Arkady Strugatsky, having graduated from the Military Institute of Foreign Languages, became a translator officer proficient in Japanese and English, and from 1946 to 1954, he gained experience working with classified documents and interrogating prisoners of war and war criminals. Boris Strugatsky, after returning to Leningrad, led the ordinary life of an intellectual schoolboy and student, graduating from Leningrad University (Faculty of Mathematics and Mechanics). Their life-meaning orientations converged under the influence of constant correspondence and rare meetings during Arkady's leaves, which were spent in Leningrad. After the elder brother's demobilization in 1956, he settled in Moscow, and meetings and correspondence with his brother became much more frequent, though their main circles of friends and acquaintances remained different until the end of their lives, despite belonging to the Soviet scientific-technical and artistic elite (including Naum Korzhavin and Vladimir Vysotsky). The path of both brothers into literature coincided with the period of the Thaw and the scientific-technical romanticism it engendered, which was highly fruitful for social engineering.

The Strugatskys' reading preferences, which provided them with pretexts and models for developing their own literary style, were distinctive. Arkady and Boris Strugatsky were interested in philosophy, studying the works of Marxist–Leninist classics not only for professional or academic purposes. Both valued Russian classical literature, stating that they learned to write from N. V. Gogol, L. N. Tolstoy, and A. N. Tolstoy. Arkady Strugatsky, fluent in Japanese and English, professionally followed literary novelties for many years; he likely read Orwell early on. He had access to many Japanese authors in their original language, including Akutagawa, Kan Kikuchi, and Arishima Takeo. At the same time, A. Strugatsky was indifferent to Japanese poetry, and all epigraphs and quotes from Japanese authors were selected by Boris Natanovich. Both brothers, from childhood, loved adventure literature and science fiction, favoring foreign authors. Most books by Kipling, Dumas, Wells, Jacolliot, and other writers were impossible to obtain in stores or public libraries, coming instead from the book collections of their parents or friends.

=== Work in tandem ===
According to Arkady Strugatsky's recollections, his father, Natan Zalmanovich, introduced him to literature, including science fiction, by telling him an "endless novel, created by him based on the plots of books by Mayne Reid, Jules Verne, and Fenimore Cooper". The elder Strugatsky brother began attempting to write science fiction prose as early as the late 1930s (according to B. N. Strugatsky, this was the novella "Major Kovalev's Find," lost during the Leningrad blockade). Such plots were composed orally and discussed with his friend and neighbor Igor Ashmarin. According to Mikhail Shavshin, Ashmarin's personality likely had a significant influence on at least the elder brother's life, as he served as a prototype for characters in many literary works. Occasionally, the younger brother Boris was admitted to this "literary feast". A surviving letter from 20 May 1943, when Arkady was studying at an artillery school, mentions their joint novella about the adventures of their mother and younger brother in blockaded Leningrad ("Write to me in more detail about how your work on the novella is going and what plan you're following"). At that time, Arkady was seventeen, and Boris was ten. Surviving texts in the archive date to a later period, particularly Arkady Strugatsky's service in Kamchatka, which left him with free time.

The Strugatsky Brothers' literary "godfather" was Roman Kim, a counterintelligence officer specializing in Japan, who was a well-known Soviet adventure genre writer. Biographers differ on when their acquaintance occurred. In the brothers' 1952 correspondence, Kim's novella "The Notebook Found in Sunchon" is mentioned, which Arkady strongly recommended to Boris. Their direct acquaintance may have taken place in 1954 or 1958 (the latter date has documentary evidence). In 1954, Arkady Strugatsky wrote the documentary novella Ashes of Bikini Atoll (about the fate of the fishing schooner Fukuryu Maru), which his colleague, Sovinformburo employee Lev Petrov, took on to promote. Petrov managed to arrange its publication in the journal "Far East," and in April 1956, Roman Kim became the editor of the novella. According to researcher Viktor Petrovich Burya, Arkady Strugatsky likely participated in editing the novella, suggesting their acquaintance with Kim dates to April 1956. The decision to publish was made in August 1956, with the author's fee split equally; by then, both Strugatsky and Petrov had settled in Moscow. Roman Kim oversaw the science fiction direction in the Writers' Union and, in 1963, actively supported the Strugatskys, emphasizing that "the West is waging a broad anti-Soviet and anti-communist offensive in science fiction." Accordingly, the Strugatskys considered him one of the key figures in the rise of Soviet science fiction.

In 1958, while the Strugatskys awaited the approval of their debut novella The Land of Crimson Clouds at the "Detgiz" publishing house, Roman Kim was organizing a specialized almanac of science fiction and adventure and commissioned Arkady Strugatsky to write the novella From the Inside. At that time, they also met Ivan Yefremov. In December 1960, Roman Kim, Ivan Yefremov, and critic K. Andreev provided recommendations for the Strugatskys' admission to the Union of Soviet Writers. (Note: In Moscow's literary life in the 1950s, informal associations like salons played a significant role; A. N. Strugatsky was initially a member of translator Vera Markova’s salon, where Roman Kim was a regular and where the acquaintance with Yefremov occurred.) The admission process was delayed for several reasons (despite the adventure and science fiction subsection recommending acceleration twice), and only on 25 February 1964, were Arkady and Boris Strugatsky elected to the Writers' Union with nine votes in favor and five abstentions. Secondary recommendations were provided by Ivan Yefremov, K. Andreev, and A. Gromova.

After 1966–1968, the attitude toward science fiction (especially the philosophical science fiction developed by the Strugatskys) changed at the level of the Department of Agitation and Propaganda of the Central Committee of the CPSU and the Central Committee of the Komsomol. This was expressed through closed resolutions regulating publishing policies in science fiction and critical campaigns in the press against specific writers and works. Serious conflicts between the co-authors and party authorities occurred in 1968 and 1972 regarding the publication of the novella Tale of the Troika in the almanac Angara and the printing of the novella The Ugly Swans in the émigré publication Grani. After 1968, three of the Strugatskys' works (Tale of the Troika, Snail on the Slope, and The Ugly Swans) gradually became uncensored literature, circulated in samizdat. The Strugatskys' attempts to distance themselves from publications in European émigré outlets were largely unsuccessful, even despite a rebuttal in Literaturnaya Gazeta in 1972. Each such publication further distanced the authors from official print media. (Note: In the 1970s, science fiction split into "official" and "samizdat" categories. The former existed under the control of the Central Committee of the CPSU, with official publication and distribution channels being the journal Iskatel and the new editorial board of Molodaya Gvardiya led by Yuri Medvedev.) A landmark event for the Strugatskys in their relations with the authorities and Soviet publishing policy in science fiction was the publication history of the novella Roadside Picnic, which dragged on for ten years. In 1970, the authors submitted an application to Molodaya Gvardiya for the collection Unappointed Encounters (From the Inside, The Kid, Roadside Picnic), which was published in 1980 after repeated reminders and even lawsuits. In 1974, the Committee for State Security showed interest in Boris Strugatsky in connection with the case of his friend Mikhail Kheifets, arrested for distributing his article Joseph Brodsky and Our Generation (a preface to the so-called Maramzin collection of Brodsky's works). Boris Strugatsky and his wife Adelaide (née Karpelyuk) were witnesses. The emotional experiences were reflected in the tone and plot idea of the novella A Billion Years Before the End of the World. Although in the 1960s–1970s, the Strugatskys (like I. A. Yefremov) represented a liberal-reformist direction in Soviet non-realist literature, they could not be classified as dissidents or anti-Soviet; they demonstrated loyalty to the authorities until their final years. (Note: Critic Roman Arbitman wrote in the preface to the 33-volume complete works: "In reality, the writers were neither ardent dissidents — despite 'The Ugly Swans' published by the émigré 'Posev' — nor, even less, pillars of the ruling regime — despite the consistent presence of the words 'communist' and 'communard' in their novels about a bright future. The writers simply tried to live honestly, without compromising themselves, within the given conditions and extracted the maximum from the few degrees of freedom granted to them at the time by the Homeostatic Universe".)

In the creative tandem, Arkady Natanovich and Boris Natanovich switched roles over time. According to the younger brother, in the decade from 1955 to 1965, the elder — Arkady — "was... assertive, incredibly hardworking, and fearless of any work in the world. Probably, after the army, this civilian world seemed to him a realm of unlimited freedoms and incredible opportunities." It is noted that, twenty years later, leadership (in terms of plot and publishing initiatives) clearly shifted to Boris Strugatsky. By early 1991, a breakdown occurred, when, in Ant Skalandis's words, "it became completely impossible to combine what they were now inventing and writing". The last meeting of Arkady and Boris Strugatsky took place in Moscow from 16 to 19 January 1991, and ended in a serious quarrel, possibly related to the elder brother's illness. (Note: In A. N. Strugatsky's diary entry dated 20 January 1991, he wrote: "Tired of Boris. It feels like he comes to gorge on meat and watch videos and TV. Toward the end, we quarreled. <...> I was beside myself with anger. I can't deal with him anymore. He makes me ill. He plans to show up in the second half of February, but I won't let him. <...> B. N., my health is more important than you. After his departure, I even had something like a breakdown...") However, in the working diary kept by both co-authors, the entry "The writer 'Br<others> Strugatsky' no longer exists" was made by B. N. Strugatsky on 13 October — the day after his brother's death.

=== Literary technique: collaborative work ===
The collaboration of two brothers living and working in different cities distinguished the Strugatskys in terms of literary technique. In interviews, the writers joked about it, leading to a legend that they met to work at the Bologoye station, halfway between Leningrad and Moscow. In reality, developing methods for collaborative creativity took over a decade and was finalized by 1960. For a long time, the initiator of the creative tandem's projects was Arkady Natanovich, who, during his military service (in Siberia, Kamchatka, and the Far East), tried his hand at writing stories and novellas, while Boris Natanovich acted as the first reader, reviewer, and consultant on "technical issues." In the second half of the 1950s, when Arkady Strugatsky was demobilized and worked as an editor in various Moscow publishing houses, the brothers did not abandon the idea of collaborative creativity. However, the technique used during the writing of the Land of Crimson Clouds is described by A. V. Snigirev as "strange": the co-authors wrote independently, sending each other completed chapters, fragments, and parts. This technique was perceived by the Strugatskys themselves as "flawed" as early as their 1956 correspondence. Later, Boris Natanovich often acted as the "idea generator," with Arkady implementing those ideas in the text, though the elder brother insisted that they should write together: "The firm 'ABS' must act as a united front".

In 1958, the co-authors tried and rejected the concept of "stepped editing," where Arkady sent Boris chapters as they were completed, receiving them back after editing. At the same time, the brothers experimented with different genres and forms: the elder in novels, the younger in short stories. Sometimes they switched roles. In 1955, they wrote the story Sand Fever, created spontaneously, like bouts-rimés, without any preliminary plan, yet resulting in a cohesive work. In addition to working on the text, communicating with journal editors and publishing house management, conducting ongoing correspondence, and attending business meetings caused conflicts over the division of responsibilities as early as the 1960s, when the brothers were actively publishing and became sought-after writers. The collaborative work method was finalized either by the completion of The Land of Crimson Clouds or during the writing of the novella The Way to Amalthea in 1959. In the retrospective Comments on the Past, Boris Strugatsky stated that, having tried all conceivable schemes and variants of working together, the co-authors, through trial and error, created a final technique that they adhered to until the end of their creative tandem.

The specificity of ABS's work, where any minimally serious text is created together, simultaneously, word by word, paragraph by paragraph, page by page; where any phrase in the draft has two, three, or four predecessor phrases proposed as variants, once spoken aloud but never written down; where the final text is a fusion of two — sometimes very different — visions of it, not just a fusion but a kind of chemical compound at the molecular level — this specificity, among other things, produces two purely quantitative consequences. Firstly, the amount of paper in the archives is reduced to a minimum. Each novel exists in the archive as only one, at most two, drafts, each of which is actually a recorded, edited, and compressed text of two, three, or four ORAL drafts, previously articulated by the authors and polished through fierce discussions.

Relatively short working meetings (initially at the co-authors' homes, and after joining the Union of Soviet Writers, at Writers' Creative Houses) were preceded by extensive material preparation. Work began only after a preliminary development of the work's plan, sometimes down to minute details (including the arrangement of mise-en-scènes or even key phrases). The writing process, in B. N. Strugatsky's words, was like "building flesh on the skeleton": the text was the result of a continuous dialogue, discussing literally every word and phrase. Further work with the text, related to passing through editorial and censorship, was also intensive, though B. Strugatsky often evaluated it negatively. However, according to A. V. Snigirev, published draft and preparatory materials suggest that editors' and censors' suggestions significantly improved the texts both artistically and ideologically, contributing to more precise work on each word and the overall content. According to Snigirev, the Strugatskys' "internal" texts or those not intended for publication clearly demonstrate a certain "weakness" compared to published works.

== Literary features ==
=== Pretexts and the writers' self-myth ===
At the turn of the 2000s, Boris Strugatsky began extensive work to explain the creative process he shared with his brother, but the Comments on the Past and responses to readers' questions do not always align with surviving and published documents, sometimes representing, in the terminology of A. V. Snigirev, memory's games. Furthermore, it becomes clear that the history of the creation and publication of many of the Strugatskys' works, particularly their debut novella The Land of Crimson Clouds, was, to some extent, deliberately obscured by Boris Strugatsky himself. Similarly, the story that the brothers began writing their debut novella on a bet with Arkady Strugatsky's wife has become legendary. The co-authors kept work diaries irregularly, and many surviving records are terse and barely lend themselves to interpretation. As noted by D. Volodihin and G. Prashkevich, the "Comments on the Past represent a narrative... from the lesser part of this creative partnership". Candidate of Philological Sciences A. V. Snigirev described the self-myth of the writer, which began forming in the early 1990s, closely tied to hagiographical literature and the genre of the "literary monument." The scale of the self-myth created by Boris Strugatsky is likely the largest in contemporary Russian literature and can be compared to the "Lovecraftian myth" in the United States. A key component of this myth is the categorical denial of any intertextual connections, with the works presented exclusively as original. For example, in their early period, the Strugatskys willingly mentioned Ivan Yefremov's name and even attempted, at the turn of the 1950s–1960s, to construct a unified meta-world of the Bright Future, using the same setting elements and terminology, primarily based on Yefremov's works. Conversely, when their vision of Soviet science fiction began to diverge, Boris Strugatsky spoke and wrote about Ivan Antonovich in a dismissive tone ("he was not a great writer, nor did he particularly claim that title—he considered himself primarily a philosopher"). (Note: Conversely, D. Volodihin and G. Prashkevich, characterizing the stylistics of their work, stated that early Yefremov is as much more dynamic and lively than the early Strugatskys as the mature Strugatskys (from the mid-1960s) are literarily more refined than the mature Yefremov.)

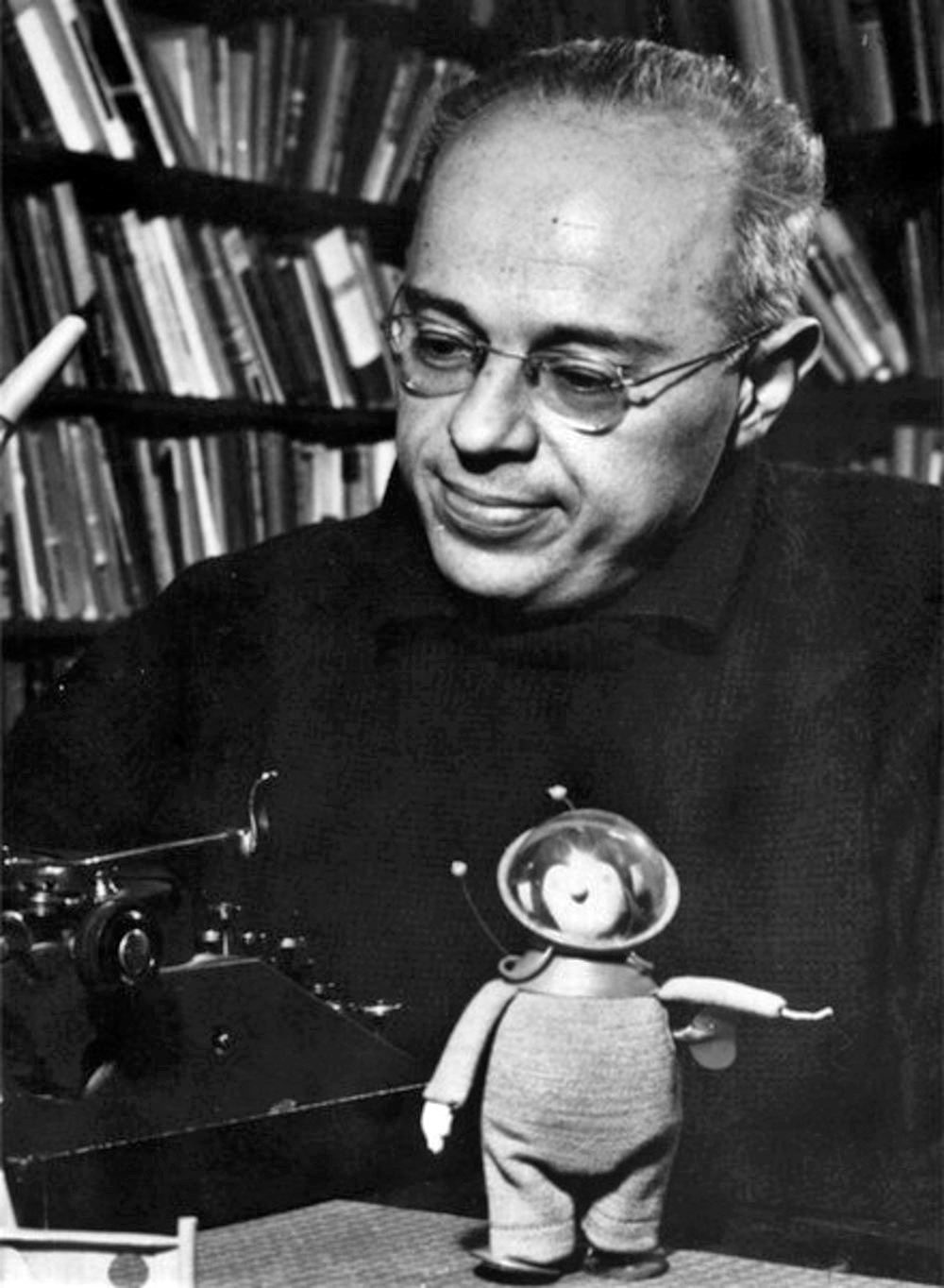
Stanisław Lem in 1966

The Strugatskys' work is characterized by the constant presence of pretexts that served as models for plot construction, shaping ideological concepts, stylistic guidelines, and a means to overcome creative crises. "The Strugatskys were quite comfortable with using other texts in their works," extensively employing intertextual references and literary games. Critics of the Strugatskys' early works noted significant influence (and even possible borrowings) from Stanisław Lem. In later comments, Boris Strugatsky spoke only of a "great similarity of mentalities," categorically denying any possibility of influence. However, the pretexts for The Land of Crimson Clouds, Attempt at Escape, and Snail on the Slope were Lem's Astronauts, Eden, and Manuscript Found in a Bathtub, respectively, with translations (sometimes in manuscript form) known to the Strugatskys before they began work on these texts. In writing Snail on the Slope, familiarity with the works of Kafka played a significant role, as The Trial was read by A. N. Strugatsky in 1963 in English translation; the Russian translation appeared in 1965. On this basis, B. Strugatsky acknowledged the influence of Kafkaesque imagery on the depictions of the Administration, but dated his familiarity with Kafka to after Snail on the Slope was published. Analysis by A. V. Snigirev demonstrates a much stronger connection between Snail... and Lem's Manuscript Found in a Bathtub. M. F. Amusin argued that the similarity between the Strugatskys' early work and Lem up to Solaris is undeniable but thematic in nature. It primarily concerns a tendency toward global generalizations, thought experiments, and the sociocultural orientation of these experiments. However, Lem's epistemological pursuits after the 1960s, postmodernist games, construction of informational models of human consciousness, and semiotic explorations significantly diverged the writers from one another. The Strugatskys remained within the realm of social practice and the psychological and behavioral attitudes of their characters.

A significant layer of pretexts for the Strugatskys lies in American science fiction from the 1950s–1970s. Ray Bradbury had a certain influence on the co-authors, noticeable, according to M. Amusin, in Predatory Things of the Century. The writers were united by a love for building fantastic premises on the solid foundation of everyday realities and a reverence for life in all its manifestations. However, Bradbury's mythopoetic suggestiveness, his pronounced romanticism, and emotionality are far from the Strugatskys' realistic science fiction. The brothers' artistic logic is stricter, more rationalistic, rooted in the sphere of social relations. Experimenting with allegories, the Strugatskys used them for satirical purposes without exceeding the boundaries of grotesque. Their satirical tone aligned them with Robert Sheckley. Thematically, his story The Hangover correlates with Predatory Things of the Century, though it lacks the Strugatskys' sharpness and radical fervor. Even closer to the co-authors is Kurt Vonnegut, though he lacks their rationality in posing problems and tendency toward model situations. They are united by the consistent use of fantastic premises to diagnose the ailments of human civilization and a rejection of isolationism that relegates science fiction to a "ghetto," a preserve of escapism. The Strugatskys' fantastic epic about the conquest of the universe is comparable in many ways to the worlds of Ursula K. Le Guin, with a fundamental difference: the American writer views progressor activity as a given, requiring neither "feverish justification nor passionate refutation". (Note: Unlike Lem and Le Guin, the Strugatskys never attempted to model alternative biological forms of intelligent life or a consistent picture of a society built on such a biological basis. With rare exceptions, their aliens are indistinguishable from humans in biosocial terms, differing only in the flow and forms of historical time. The only complete, consistent depiction of an extraterrestrial civilization is presented in the forest chapters of "Snail on the Slope." M. Amusin noted that Le Guin and most of her colleagues focused readers' attention on the "distant," exotic, and incomprehensible. Her Ekumen is simultaneously characterized by centripetal force and atomization; the worldview is conveyed through complex mythopoetic metaphors and intricate symbolism. The Strugatskys' universe, in worldview terms, is Ptolemaic—it gravitates toward and revolves around humanity. Their writerly approach is fundamentally anti-transcendental and anti-mythological, lacking references to higher, universal entities; the most complex problems are conceived as intellectually graspable, tangible, and observable.)

Yu. Chernyakhovskaya noted that even in their very first novella, The Land of Crimson Clouds, the influence of Hemingway is evident, which in the first half of the 1960s led to complex combinations in the co-authors' work. The cult of camaraderie and drinking, set by Hemingway's texts, aligned well with the values of the Russian intelligentsia (and Arkady Strugatsky's personal inclinations) and gave rise to a specific hybrid — "romantic ignorance," where outward roughness masked an inner reservoir of knowledge. This did not negate the pathos of humanity's struggle with nature and the "calm heroism" of the main characters, as it was through Hemingway's texts that the Strugatskys learned to eschew pathos. From the 1960s, the elder Strugatsky was strongly influenced by Bulgakov, and thus the later works of the brothers are marked by clear literary rivalry with the author of The Master and Margarita (especially in Lame Fate and Burdened by Evil).

=== Authorial Narrative Strategy: Prefiguration ===
One of the distinctive features of the Strugatskys' narrative was its encrypted nature, termed by S. Plekhanov as aesopian language, linked to the general lack of freedom of expression in the Soviet era. This gave rise to a significant tradition in literary studies and fandom, where representatives sought to "decrypt", "decode" the text, determining what certain "strange" or "fantastic" narrative elements "mean" or "symbolize." Most often, the encrypted message is assumed to be an extended ideological statement or even a political manifesto. The consistent application of this methodology from the 1980s to 2010s, while retaining the decryption toolkit, shifted from anti-totalitarian and anti-Soviet subtexts to the search for pro-communist and anti-dissident subtexts. In a politicized environment, attitudes toward the Strugatskys often serve as a form of self-identification, distinguishing "us" from "them," and declaring a wide range of ideological priorities, from left-wing radicalism to conservatism. The material for such interpretations typically consists of texts not published in the USSR until the political changes of the 1980s. The interpretation process is perceived and described as "solving a puzzle"—ethical or logical, often in terms of "learning to think"; the Strugatskys are credited with the ability to predict and foresee "our current problems," with contemporaneity itself serving as the key to interpretation.

According to cultural historian I. Kaspe, attempts at decryption of any kind, regardless of the stated goal, represent the maximum rationalization of the reader's experience: "...the value and (crucially) the possibility of absolutely successful communication between authors and readers is declared. In other words, the reader must ultimately understand what the text means—understanding is inevitable, though delayed for various reasons". (Note: The question of the Strugatskys' texts' addressivity is considered separately, as the authors themselves rarely indicated it (the only exception being the ironic subtitle to "Monday Begins on Saturday"— "for junior scientific researchers"). In "Lame Fate," there is a deconstruction of the reader's image: Felix Sorokin claims he knows nothing about his readers. "They are just a lot of unfamiliar, completely extraneous people to me." Virtually all comprehensive studies of the Strugatskys' work include periodizations based on the observation that works written in different years differ so significantly that they seem addressed to different audiences. Most researchers find the Strugatskys interesting only after they moved beyond "hard science fiction" (hard SF). Lev Losev noted (without referencing the Strugatskys' texts) that under the guise of children's or young adult literature, a message for far more sophisticated readers might be concealed.) Based on sociological surveys of Strugatsky readers, Irina Kaspe concluded that "the logic of progressive evolution from simple to complex, from unambiguous to polysemous, does not always apply here, and the audience for early and late works may differ far less than the works themselves".

American researcher Yvonne Howell disagreed with the widespread politicized interpretations of the Strugatskys' texts and did not highlight issues of Aesopian language. She considered the strategy of describing the Strugatskys' prose as a set of allegories hidden under the guise of a "popular" (science fiction, partly detective, and adventure) genre to be oversimplified. For the brothers' texts of the 1980s, Howell introduces the concept of the "prefiguration" mechanism: the narrative incorporates images and motifs already established in certain cultural practices, tied to a stable complex of reader expectations and even archetypal motifs (from literary to religious). These motifs can unfold into a specific narrative paradigm, thereby "anticipating" further plot developments to a greater extent than genre formulas. The mechanism operates not so much through allegorical means as through intertextuality: according to Howell, the Strugatskys attempt to "renew the interrupted dialogue" with the "philosophical and aesthetic traditions of Russian modernism," and it is this "apocalyptic culture of the pre- and post-revolutionary era" that is recognized as the primary source of images and motifs, the main channel for prefiguration. Prefiguration implies a highly rationalized authorial strategy. Yvonne Howell emphasizes that the Strugatskys consciously drew on sources "forgotten" by Soviet readers, displaced from "cultural memory." It is assumed that the layering of "half-familiar images" allowed readers to "recall" the forgotten: as the protagonist of the novel "Doomed City" passes by workers digging a pit on the city's outskirts on his way home, the Strugatskys' reader, according to the researcher, should "mentally 'pass by' Platonov's novel The Foundation Pit, recalling both its content and its true 'place' in the disrupted and distorted continuum of Russian intellectual history". (Note: Interpretations of allusions and allegories often prove unworkable or misleading. "Doctor Golem in The Ugly Swans (1967) has absolutely no connection to the Kabbalistic legend, and the names of characters in Second Invasion from Mars (1966) are arbitrarily borrowed from Greek mythology: an aging housewife has nothing in common with the mythological Eurydice, a city intellectual with Charon, a tedious pharmacist with Achilles, and so on. Unlike Joyce's Ulysses or Updike's Centaur, Second Invasion from Mars does not imply characterological or plot-related hints. Readers encounter a pseudo-puzzle and simultaneously something recognized as a particular 'atmosphere,' 'aura' of the narrative. The ancient Greek aura may introduce meanings of fate, choice, and tragedy, contrasting with the grotesque story of Martians harvesting human gastric juice on an industrial scale, but it resists further decryption".) Irina Kaspe highly valued the concept of prefiguration, as "vaguely recognizing but not identifying the prefigured image, the reader attributes to it the characteristics of reality, especially in contrast to 'fantastic' settings and in combination with details 'from everyday life'".

In general, the Strugatskys' creative style, starting with Attempt at Escape, is characterized by textual multilayeredness and a discrepancy between the initial premise of a work and its final result (as evidenced by published materials and Boris Strugatsky's authorial comments). This allows for interpretations using the formula "this work is about..." while simultaneously avoiding overly definitive judgments. The Strugatskys themselves constantly blended various narrative types: without neglecting entertaining genres, including detective stories, they consistently appealed to serious literature (in Irina Kaspe's terminology, to Western intellectual literature). The authorial strategy manifests at the intersection: while entertaining genres presuppose formulaic reading, motifs and images borrowed from great literature and subjected to prefiguration may be perceived as extraliterary, as "reality itself". M. F. Amusin wrote similarly.

=== Themes ===
Mark Amusin identified four genre-thematic groups in the Strugatskys' body of work:

1. Fantastic epic (the space trilogy, Noon, 22nd Century, Hard to Be a God, and other works about contact).
2. Dystopias and cautionary novels (Predatory Things of the Century, The Ugly Swans, Roadside Picnic).
3. Fantastic satire and allegory (The Doomed City, Second Invasion from Mars, Snail on the Slope, Tale of the Troika).
4. Fairy-tale fantasy (Monday Begins on Saturday, Lame Fate, Burdened by Evil).

In terms of events, the works, starting with The Land of Crimson Clouds, form a unified history of the future, spanning events from the late 20th to the end of the 22nd century. The spatial structure of this world is relatively simple, encompassing realms of worlds already known and yet to be explored by humanity in the conquered cosmos; in early works written before 1962, expansionist motifs predominate. The main characters here are space explorers: pilots, paratroopers, and later progressors. In the works of the 1980s, the motifs shift: humanity's concerns revolve around potential influences on their own planet from inhabitants of other worlds. Even in their earliest epic novellas, the Strugatskys developed several recurring motifs that run through their entire oeuvre. One such motif is the threat posed by non-human intelligence. In the Noon utopia, the Massachusetts Nightmare is mentioned: a highly complex cybernetic machine created by humans threatened to create artificial intelligence—the foundation of an earthly non-human civilization—in a matter of minutes. Traces of a super-civilization's activities—so-called Wanderers—are found in abundance on the nearest planets of the Solar System and in other worlds. The Strugatskys were little interested in aliens themselves, and, for example, the biological civilization of the planet Leonida is mentioned in various works in just a couple of lines. In spatiotemporal terms, the Strugatskys' fantastic universe is simple and clearly structured: Earth's affairs are separated from extraterrestrial ones. The theme of the time paradox is present but addressed in a non-cosmic context, primarily in Attempt at Escape (Saul Repnin, a fugitive from the 20th century) and, in a more veiled form, in The Ugly Swans (the mokretsy—time travelers from a horrific future who disappear along with it after reality is altered). The Strugatskys were minimally interested in the problem of artificial intelligence and robotics, which are mentioned only episodically.

The archetypal science fiction theme of catastrophe is represented broadly and diversely: In Far Rainbow, the reckless pursuit of physicists for self-sufficient knowledge triggers the Wave, which destroys all life on the planet. The traditional theme of Earth's conquest by aliens is travestied in Second Invasion from Mars. The catastrophe in The Ugly Swans is bloodless and tinged with idealistic tones. Roadside Picnic presents a fundamental Strugatsky "thought-image": the apocalypse is created by humanity itself, unfolds gradually, and one can learn to live within it. All possibilities of this plot were realized in Doomed City, whose inhabitants are constantly subjected to both minor and global trials. In "Beetle in the Anthill," a more traditional image of catastrophe is depicted, vividly illustrated by the secondary plot of Lev Abalkin's wanderings with the intelligent cynoid Shchekn on the dead planet Hope.

Mark Amusin classified a range of dissimilar Strugatsky works as belonging to the fantasy layer. The novella Monday Begins on Saturday is a collage of fairy tales and pseudo-scientific terminology, based on a "handbook of world folkloristics." One of the key motifs of the novella is omnipotence, which, as it turns out, is severely limited even when resorting to magic. The magician's power is framed by an imperative of continuous self-development, discipline, training, and even the eradication of "Paleolithic remnants in consciousness." Magic punishes the complacent: fur grows on their ears. In the final part of the novella, the Strugatskys present a heuristically vivid yet puzzling model of a scientific problem and its solutions on a deliberately unserious basis: unraveling the mystery of the director of the Institute of Wizardry and Sorcery, Janus Poluektovich (he is "one in two persons"), and his resurrecting and dying parrot named Photon. In the sequel, Tale of the Troika, the satirical-polemical element is much stronger, with magic serving as a means of illusorily-virtual overcoming of bureaucratic forces. The fantastical nature of Lame Fate is rooted in everyday reality, depicted with deliberate realism. However, it fully aligns with the definition given by Tzvetan Todorov: in 1982 Moscow, utterly improbable events occur, and both the protagonist and readers must constantly waver between explaining them through natural causes or invoking metaphysical entities. The authors left all ambiguities unresolved, transferring them to the level of a fantastic-literary game with the resurrected Mikhail Afanasyevich Bulgakov, who embodies conscience and the true value of literary creation. Fantasy becomes both the goal and the means of the authors' reflection on the essence of literature itself. M. Amusin identified similar motifs in Burdened by Evil, where the narrative unfolds through a matrix of evangelical events presented as apocrypha; history ceases to be linear.

The Strugatskys were not interested in science fiction for its own sake, yet the fantastic premise in their works was not utilitarian, used merely for external purposes. All their novellas and stories are linked to the real world, satisfying the same criteria of accuracy and consistency as mainstream prose; moreover, the fantastic premises (in M. Amusin's terminology) are "economical" and never serve as mere props. The only exception is Monday Begins on Saturday, where "garish excess" is an element of aesthetic play.

=== Poetics ===
==== Plot ====
Mark Amusin noted that the Strugatskys' immense reader popularity is not necessarily an indicator of artistic merit, but, speaking of their works after the 1960s, he describes the co-authors' prose as "at the very least skillful and aesthetically substantial." However, studies of the Strugatskys' poetics by the mid-1990s were complimentary, as science fiction analysis focused solely on "content" and ideological orientation. The situation has not changed significantly in the 21st century. According to M. Amusin, the Strugatskys were primarily masters of plot, capable of constructing event sequences engagingly and elegantly, "maintaining and heightening the degree of reader interest." This skill was honed by the co-authors at the turn of the 1950s–1960s: in The Land of Crimson Clouds, the fabula was built linearly by accumulating ever-new difficulties for the heroes to overcome. The fabular line is even weaker in Return (later reworked as Noon, 22nd Century) and Interns, which consist of a mosaic linkage of episodes. In "Interns," a parallel plot follows the maturation of Yura Borodin's personality under the influence of surrounding space explorers, but this line leads to neither climax nor denouement. Subsequently, the Strugatskys learned to subtly accelerate and decelerate the plot, with applied techniques becoming more complex; a "revolution" in plot construction came with the novella Predatory Things of the Century". Here, they discovered the possibilities of embedding a detective plot within a fantastic narrative, incorporating Hemingwayesque reminiscences. In this technique, the plot is built on double omission, precise dosing of information provided to the reader, with the reader understanding the depicted reality even less than the protagonist, who must unravel a series of mysteries. This technique was successfully applied in The Ugly Swans, Inhabited Island, Hotel..., and Beetle in the Anthill. The detective line involves not only the use of classic police investigations but, more broadly, the exploration of some hidden essence revealed to the hero through fragmented and random manifestations, only deepening the mystery. From the time of writing Doomed City, fragmentation became a key compositional principle: this novel consists of six parts, between which the time of action, the protagonist's social status, and the dominant aspects of his worldview change abruptly. Fragmentation worked particularly effectively, according to M. Amusin, in Beetle in the Anthill, where the core investigation plot conducted by Maxim Kammerer is supplemented by Abalkin's reports on wanderings across a dead planet, forming a "novel within a novel". The mysteriousness becomes multi-layered and "multi-storied" as the narrative progresses.

M. Amusin called the Strugatskys' "golden vein" as plot craftsmen their method of complementing the traditional plot goal (reaching a certain point in space or obtaining an object) with an ethical or intellectual conflict crucial to the heroes, requiring resolution during the action. The fabular dynamic, combined with the hero's obligation to make choices, feeds into each other, placing the reader in a "powerful field of anticipation and empathy." The first attempts at such integration were made in Attempt at Escape and Hard to Be a God, and were later used extensively, particularly effectively in Roadside Picnic" and "Beetle... For the mature Strugatskys, open endings are also highly characteristic, of two types. In "Predatory Things of the Century," the plot is cyclical, and the protagonist achieves his goal: he discovers the source of the electronic drug and understands its essence. However, this is only a "minor" ending, as even Ivan Zhilin's immediate superiors are not convinced of his conclusions, and all the work lies ahead. The other type of ending is open to both the reader and the protagonist: typical examples include Roadside Picnic, A Billion Years Before the End of the World, and The Ugly Swans.

==== Characters and psychology ====
The literary heroes of the early Strugatskys were constructed stereotypically, lacking psychological depth, with individuality often represented by a single trait (even the legendary cosmonaut Leonid Gorbovsky was distinguished only by his tendency to rest horizontally), and overcoming functional character construction was achieved only with the figures of Anton-Rumata and Ivan Zhilin, with their inner dialogues and vivid intonation. In The Ugly Swans, the character of writer Viktor Banev becomes, for the first time, a factor in organizing the plot and the narrative itself. This is achieved through the multifaceted manifestation of the hero's personality, as Banev participates in all events and plot twists, which are presented to the reader entirely through his personal perception. In the 1970s, the Strugatskys consistently psychologized their characters. M. Amusin considered the stalker Red Schuhart (Roadside Picnic) the most vivid of their heroes, presented from various perspectives: as a narrator, from the viewpoint of his friend Richard Noonan, in the first person, and in the final internal monologue. The novella vividly depicts the hero's aging and the evolution of his personality. Andrei Voronin in Doomed City is created on the same principle; this novel is notable for the Strugatskys' departure from a single-figure psychological system, supplemented by the character of Izy Katsman, who accompanies Andrei throughout the narrative.

Initially, the Strugatskys' novellas lacked female characters entirely, but gradually they began to introduce traditionally feminine traits into the Noon Universe (humanity, patience, support, the ability to live for love). The relationship between "female" and "male" is treated uniquely in Snail on the Slope, where all interactions in the bureaucratic Administration are imbued with sexual motifs, and even the position of Director depends on the favor of the librarian Alevtina. In the Forest, amazons who reproduce via parthenogenesis dominate, commanding biorobots and destroying technological civilization through a form of Possession. The authors never depicted the motivations of female characters' actions. Maya Glumova in The Kid plays an almost equal role to men—Stas or Komov—disrupting a crucial experiment by her colleagues, guided by both emotions and an ethical stance. According to A. V. Kozlov (Ural Federal University) and B. Mezhuev, in the Strugatskys' artistic world, the male world is associated with technology and the pathos of universal expansion, opposed by the female world: complete and self-sufficient, not implying development or evolution. Its highest embodiment is the parthenogenetic biological civilization of amazons in Snail. In The Kid, the role of a mother saving a child is played by an entire planet, whose secrets Maya Glumova prevents from being penetrated. It is women who reveal to the hero the truth about the impossibility of knowing everything about the world or stepping outside it (to view it from the outside and thus "complete" one's knowledge of it), offering instead the understanding that, while being part of the world, they can vanish from it without a trace. The only work featuring a female protagonist is The Ugly Swans. Banev's companion, Diana, bears the name of the Roman goddess of the moon and hunting, reflected in her descriptions: she is full of zeal and not without belligerence. Yvonne Howell, in her dissertation, generalized that female characters in the Strugatskys' works occupy a secondary position—Diana being a rare exception—assigned the role of victim or culprit in bestial, drunken liaisons without love. Only Diana, in the novella's finale, exhibits a divine-mythological essence encoded in her name, making her the only wholly positive female character in the Strugatskys' oeuvre.

==== Style and quotation ====
From the perspective of the structure of the textual fabric and narrative tone (stylistics in the narrow sense), the early Strugatskys' texts up to Hard to Be a God and Monday Begins on Saturday were not distinguished by artistic expressiveness. The authorial style in The Land of Crimson Clouds lacked brilliance—"calm, smooth, transparent," sometimes bearing the imprint of scientific-technical bureaucratese. However, for adventure prose, the text was unhurried, with "an abundance of participial phrases, adverbs, adjectives, and a considerable number of compound sentences and complex sentences lending the text a solid leisurely pace". M. Amusin believed that at this stage, the Strugatskys strove not to harm the fantastic plot by spoiling it with "poor, tedious writing," of which there were many examples in Soviet science fiction of the 1950s. Emphasis was placed on restraint, economy, and self-restraint ("Hemingwayesque laconicism"), complemented by humor and self-irony. The Strugatskys evolved quickly and, in Monday..., demonstrated artistic ambitions realized through collage. The collage effect was also used in Hard to Be a God, where a pastiche of The Three Musketeers is blended with features of a generalized Middle Ages. Subsequently, the Strugatskys displayed exceptional stylistic and stylistic diversity, sometimes leading to eclecticism as a readiness to "use any available stylistic toolkit." Their most striking creative success is considered Snail on the Slope.

A fundamental feature of the Strugatskys' prose is its deep literariness. From their earliest works, the authors actively quoted a wide variety of texts, both for aesthetic reasons ("simply beautiful") and to play with erudite readers (who recognize unacknowledged sources), creating an additional effect of perception. Later, the Strugatskys extended the "melting pot effect" to all cultural phenomena. M. Amusin considered Hard to Be a God exemplary in this regard. Anton-Rumata evoked associations with the hero played by Pavel Kadochnikov in the film The Scout's Exploit: for 1960s readers, the familiar image facilitated entry into the fantastic world. The range of quotation in Monday Begins on Saturday is particularly broad, featuring a shape-shifting book that displays different texts each time, from A. N. Tolstoy's Gloomy Morning to Professor Karpov's monograph on the work of the mentally ill. On another level, quotation is conducted through epigraphs, each serving as a commentary on the events of each chapter. The epigraph technique was also used in other works.

=== The Strugatskys and Jewishness ===
The Shorter Jewish Encyclopedia notes that the Strugatskys considered themselves Russian writers, but due to the Jewish origin of their father, many of their works bear traces of national reflection, as well as contemplations on the essence of Jewishness and its role in world history. The character of Izy Katsman (Doomed City) is described as a "concentration of many characteristic traits of the fate of a galut Jew"; Israeli critic Maya Kaganskaya found allegories of the position of Jews in the USSR in the novellas Inhabited Island and Beetle in the Anthill. In the novel Burdened by Evil and the play Jews of the City of Peter there is a critique of antisemitism, frank to the point of being journalistic. The most thorough exploration of the theme of Jewishness in the Strugatskys' work was undertaken by Mark Amusin in his 1996 monograph. From the co-authors' earliest works, Strugatsky texts feature numerous characters with Jewish surnames (in From Beyond, Captain Kolya Ginzburg and the protagonist, archaeologist Lozovsky; in "Interns," the head of the death-planet laboratory Kolya, speaking in the language of Babel, and others). This list could be expanded; according to M. Amusin, this was both a tribute to their father and a subtle defiance of the official Soviet thesis of the dissolution of nations under communism. Many traits of Jewish mentality and spirituality can be found in the character of Peretz in Snail on the Slope: the hero seeks justice, truth, and meaning, while being a social outsider forced to live by the rules of a delirious-grotesque reality. Like many emancipated Jews, Peretz sometimes feels burdened by his freedom-rootlessness, yearning to join a collective or unifying ideology.

Examining the concept of progressorism, M. Amusin saw in it the realization of the role of Jews in the global historical process. Progressors are the spiritually advanced vanguard of humanity, transforming inert reality. The image of the progressor combined traits of the "commissar in a dusty helmet" and the scientist in a laboratory catching signals of the Future. In a sense, this resonated with the concept of the "small nation" proposed by Igor Shafarevich, noted by critics of the Strugatskys from the nationalist camp. However, it is equally clear that the Strugatskys always approached the national question from universal humanistic positions, feeling no need to "defend the honor of Jewishness". Moreover, changes in their attitude toward the Jewish question directly correlated with shifts in their worldview, and the specifically Jewish theme in their work was never self-sufficient. This is explained by both their globalist artistic thinking and the shestidesyatniki ideological stance. Jewishness in the Strugatskys' works was a metaphor and an archetypal model for representing universal problems. L. Ashkinazi and A. Kuznetsova clarified that the Jewish theme was not in demand by the Strugatskys' contemporaries, and the authors had no works specifically dedicated to it. This is because the generation of Strugatsky fans was less sensitive to Jewish themes than the previous one, and the co-authors themselves did not consider the topic particularly significant. Jewish motifs and archetypes were present in the authors' active consciousness, but to the same extent, they existed in the consciousness of their readers, meaning the Strugatskys did not convey any guiding idea regarding the Jewish question.

== Works ==
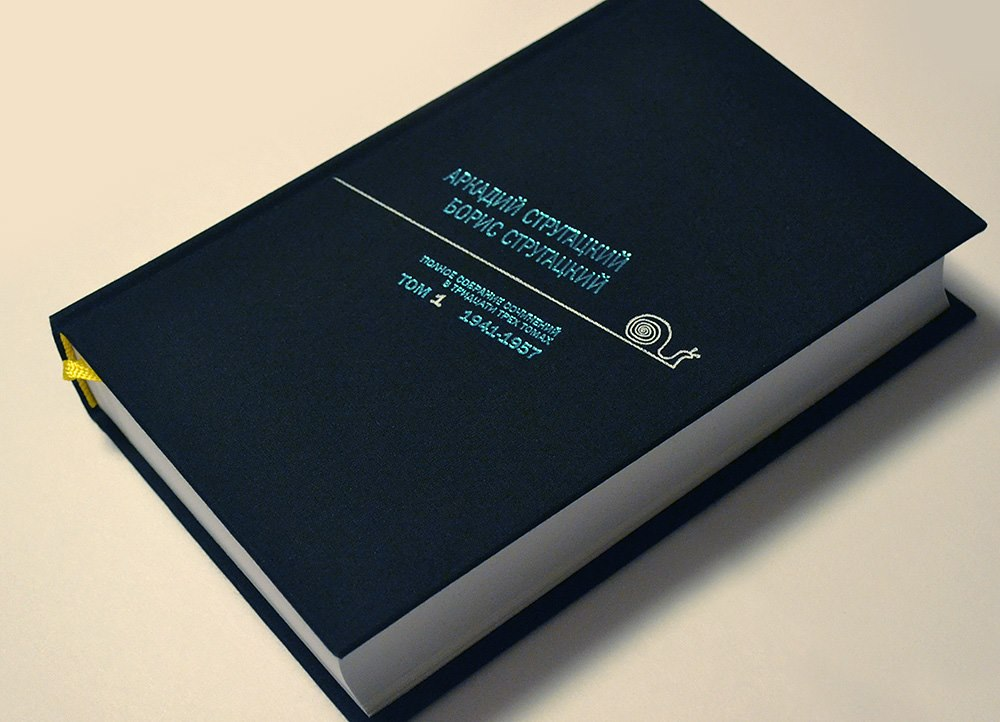
The first volume of the Strugatskys' 33-volume complete works, published by A. V. Sidorovich Publishing house (2017).

=== Novels ===
| English title | Russian title | Published in Russian | Published in English | Type of work |
|---|---|---|---|---|
| From Beyond | Извне | 1958 | 1982 | novella |
| The Land of Crimson Clouds | Страна багровых туч | 1959 | N/A | novel |
| The Way to Amalthea (also known as Destination: Amaltheia) | Путь на Амальтею | 1960 | 1963 | novella |
| Noon: 22nd Century | Полдень, XXII век | 1962 | 1978 | novel / collection of linked stories |
| Space Apprentice (also known as Probationers, includes "The Gigantic Fluctuation" short story) | Стажеры | 1962 | 1981 | novel |
| Escape Attempt | Попытка к бегству | 1962 | 1982 | novella |
| Far Rainbow | Далёкая Радуга | 1963 | 1979 | novella |
| Hard to Be a God | Трудно быть богом | 1964 | 1973; 2014 | novel |
| Monday Begins on Saturday | Понедельник начинается в субботу | 1965 | 1977; 2017 | novel |
| The Final Circle of Paradise | Хищные вещи века | 1965 | 1976 | novel |
| Disquiet (initial variant of Snail on the Slope) | Беспокойство | 1990 (written 1965) | N/A | novella |
| Snail on the Slope | Улитка на склоне | 1966–68 (written 1965) | 1980; 2018 | novel |
| Ugly Swans (re-translated in English in 2020 and published as a nested novel with Lame Fate) | Гадкие лебеди (also known as Время дождя) | 1972 (written 1966–67) | 1972; 2020 | novel; nested novel |
| The Second Invasion from Mars (also known as The Second Martian Invasion) | Второе нашествие марсиан | 1967 | 1970 | novella |
| Tale of the Troika | Сказка о Тройке | 1968 | 1977 | novella |
| Prisoners of Power (also known as The Inhabited Island) | Обитаемый остров | 1969 | 1977; 2020 | novel |
| Dead Mountaineer's Hotel (also known as Inspector Glebsky's Puzzle) | Отель «У Погибшего Альпиниста» | 1970 | 1982, 2015 | novel |
| Space Mowgli | Малыш | 1971 | 1982 | novel |
| Roadside Picnic | Пикник на обочине | 1972 | 1977; 2012 | novel |
| The Kid from Hell | Парень из преисподней | 1974 | 1982 | novella |
| The Doomed City | Град обреченный | 1988–89 (written 1970–75) | 2016 | novel |
| One Billion Years to the End of the World (originally published in English under the title Definitely Maybe) | За миллиард лет до конца света | 1977 | 1978; 2014; 2020 | novella |
| Tale of Friendship and Non-friendship | Повесть о дружбе и недружбе | 1980 | 1988 | novelette |
| Beetle in the Anthill | Жук в муравейнике | 1980 | 1980 | novel |
| Lame Fate (translated into English in 2020 and published as a nested novel with Ugly Swans) | Хромая судьба | 1986 | 2020 | novel; nested novel |
| The Time Wanderers (also translated into English in 2023 and published under the title The Waves Extinguish The Wind) | Волны гасят ветер | 1986 | 1987 | novel |
| Overburdened with Evil | Отягощённые злом | 1988 | N/A | novel |

=== Short stories ===
| English title | Russian title | Published in Russian | Published in English | Comments |
|---|---|---|---|---|
| The White Cone of the Alaid | Белый конус Алаида | 1959 | 1968 | included in the novel Noon: 22nd Century as "Defeat" |
| A Man from Pacifides | Человек из Пасифиды | 1962 | N/A | |
| The Gigantic Fluctuation | Гигантская флуктуация | 1962 | 1973 | included in the novel Space Apprentice |
| Wanderers and Travelers | О странствующих и путешествующих | 1963 | 1966 | included in the novel Noon: 22nd Century as Pilgrims and Wayfarers |

==== Short story collections ====
Short stories originally published in Six Matches:

| English title | Russian title | Published in Russian | Published in English |
|---|---|---|---|
| Six Matches | Шесть спичек | 1958 | 1961 |
| Spontaneous Reflex (also known as Initiative) | Спонтанный рефлекс | 1958 | 1959 |
| Forgotten Experiment | Забытый эксперимент | 1959 | N/A |
| The Examination of SCYBER | Испытание СКИБР | 1959 | N/A |
| Special Assumptions | Частные предположения | 1959 | N/A |
| An Emergency Case | Чрезвычайное происшествие | 1960 | 1966 |

Short stories originally published as part of the novel Noon: 22nd Century:

| English title | Russian title | Published in Russian | Published in English |
|---|---|---|---|
| Night on Mars | Ночь в пустыне | 1960 | 1978 |
| Almost the Same | Почти такие же | 1960 | 1978 |
| Old-timer | Перестарок | 1961 | 1978 |
| The Conspirators (short story) | Злоумышленники | 1962 | 1978 |
| Chronicle | Хроника | 1961 | 1978 |
| Two from the Taimyr | Двое с «Таймыра» | 1961 | 1978 |
| The Moving Roads | Самодвижущиеся дороги | 1961 | 1978 |
| Cornucopia | Скатерть-самобранка | 1961 | 1978 |
| Homecoming | Возвращение (also known as Известные люди and Пациенты доктора Протоса) | 1962 | 1978 |
| Langour of the Spirit | Томление духа | 1962 | 1978 |
| The Assaultmen | Десантники | 1961 | 1978 |
| Deep Search | Глубокий поиск | 1960 | 1978 |
| Pilgrims and Wayfarers (also known as Wanderers and Travelers) | О странствующих и путешествующих | 1963 | 1978 |
| The Planet with all the Conveniences | Благоустроенная планета | 1961 | 1978 |
| The Mystery of the Hind Leg | Загадка задней ноги (a.k.a. Великий КРИ) | 1961 | 1978 |
| Natural Science in the Spirit World | Естествознание в мире духов | 1962 | 1978 |
| Candles Before the Control Board | Свечи перед пультом | 1961 | 1978 |
| The Meeting | Свидание (a.k.a. Люди, люди...) | 1961 | 1978 |
| What You Will Be Like | Какими вы будете | 1961 | 1978 |

=== Plays ===
| English title | Russian title | Published in Russian | Published in English |
|---|---|---|---|
| Five Spoonfuls of Elixir: A Film Script | Пять ложек эликсира | 1983 | 1986 |
| Without Weapons | Без оружия | 1989 | N/A |
| Zhyds of St. Petersburg, or Melancholy Talks by Candlelight | Жиды города Питера, или Невесёлые беседы при свечах | 1990 | N/A |

=== Solo works ===
The following titles were published by Arkady Strugatsky under the pseudonym S. Yaroslavtsev (C. Ярославцев):

| English title | Russian title | Published in Russian | Published in English | Type of work |
|---|---|---|---|---|
| The Expedition into Inferno | Экспедиция в преисподнюю | 1974 | N/A | novel |
| The Details of Nikita Vorontsov's Life | Подробности жизни Никиты Воронцова | 1984 | 1989 | short story |
| Devil Amongst People | Дьявол среди людей | 1991 | N/A | |

The following titles were published by Boris Strugatsky under the pseudonym S. Vititsky (С. Витицкий):

| English title | Russian title | Published in Russian | Published in English | Type of work |
|---|---|---|---|---|
| Search for Destiny or the Twenty Seventh Theorem of Ethics | Поиск предназначения, или Двадцать седьмая теорема этики | 1994 | N/A | novel |
| The Powerless that be | Бессильные мира сего | 2003 | N/A | novel |

In addition, Boris Strugatsky published memoirs Comments on the Past about their writings.

== Adaptations ==
The Strugatsky's books were often adapted for screen, stage, comics, and video games. Some of the adaptations are very loose, like Tarkovsky's Stalker, some are not adaptations but rather new scripts written by the Brothers themselves, like The Sorcerers.

- Stalker (1979) by Andrey Tarkovsky, based on the Strugatsky's script, inspired by The Roadside Picnic
- Dead Mountaineer's Hotel (1979) by Grigori Kromanov, based on the novel of the same name
- The Sorcerers (1982), by Konstantin Bromberg, based on the Strugatsky's script inspired by Monday Begins on Saturday
- Days of Eclipse (1988) by Alexander Sokurov, inspired by One billion years before the end of the world
- Hard to be a God (1989) by Peter Fleischmann, based on the novel of the same name
- Искушение Б. (Iskushenie B.) (1991) by Arkadi Sirenko, based on the play Five Spoons of Elixir (ru)
- Nesmluvená setkání (1995 Czech TV movie, English: Unexpected Encounters) by Irena Pavlásková, based on the novel Space Mowgli
- The Ugly Swans (2006) by Konstantin Lopushansky, based on the novel of the same name
- Обитаемый остров (2008) is a two-part Russian science fiction film directed by Fyodor Bondarchuk, based on the 1969 novel published in English as Prisoners of Power
- Zone (2012) by Esa Luttinen, based on the novel The Roadside Picnic
- Hard to be a God (2013) by Alexei German, based on the novel of the same name

== Legacy ==
Several writers have to a varying degree paid their tribute to the works of Strugatsky brothers:

- Sergey Lukyanenko in his duology The Stars Are Cold Toys has the main character visit a world that is in many aspects strikingly similar to Earth from the Noon Universe but in truth is revealed to be fundamentally different and oppressive. On his website, Lukyanenko commented that he disagreed with the Strugatskys' views on education and upbringing and conceived his duology partly as a polemic criticism of it.
- The plot of Kir Bulychov's novella from the Alisa Selezneva series, Vacations in Space, or the Planet Five-Four, is based on finding a secret base of mysterious "Wanderers" (Странники), an extinct highly advanced civilization. He also depicted his own Zone in the story Save Galya!
- In the late 1990s, a three-volume collection of fiction by notable contemporary Russian science fiction authors, titled The Time of the Apprentices (Время учеников), was published with the endorsement of Boris Strugatsky. Each piece in the collection was a sequel to one of the Strugatskys' books.
- The asteroid 3054 Strugatskia, discovered by Nikolai Stepanovich Chernykh in 1977, was named after the Strugatsky brothers.
- The fictional moon Pandora depicted in the movie Avatar by James Cameron contains some similarities with the Noon Universe series, where a planet is also called Pandora. Both are filled with jungle, where weird animals and a humanoid race live. Also, the girlfriend of the biologist Sidorov in the Strugatskys' novel is called "Nava" (as compared with "Na'vi" as the name of the humanoid race in the film). However, Boris Strugatsky rejected the idea that his works had been plagiarized, despite the similarities.
- In 2014 a square in Saint Petersburg was named after the Strugatsky brothers. A memorial museum is being opened in the same city.
- The brothers are credited with saving humanity from mysterious "visitors" through technology retrieved from a "visitation zone" in the 2016 game The Final Station.
- The Polish video game developer Acid Wizard Studio cited the Strugatskys as an influence on their 2017 game Darkwood.
- The designers of the 2019 video game Disco Elysium cited the Strugatskys' writing as an influence on the game's design and writing.
- The video game series S.T.A.L.K.E.R. owes much of its background to the mix of the Strugatsky's writing and the Chernobyl disasters' zone of exclusion.

== Legacy and awards ==
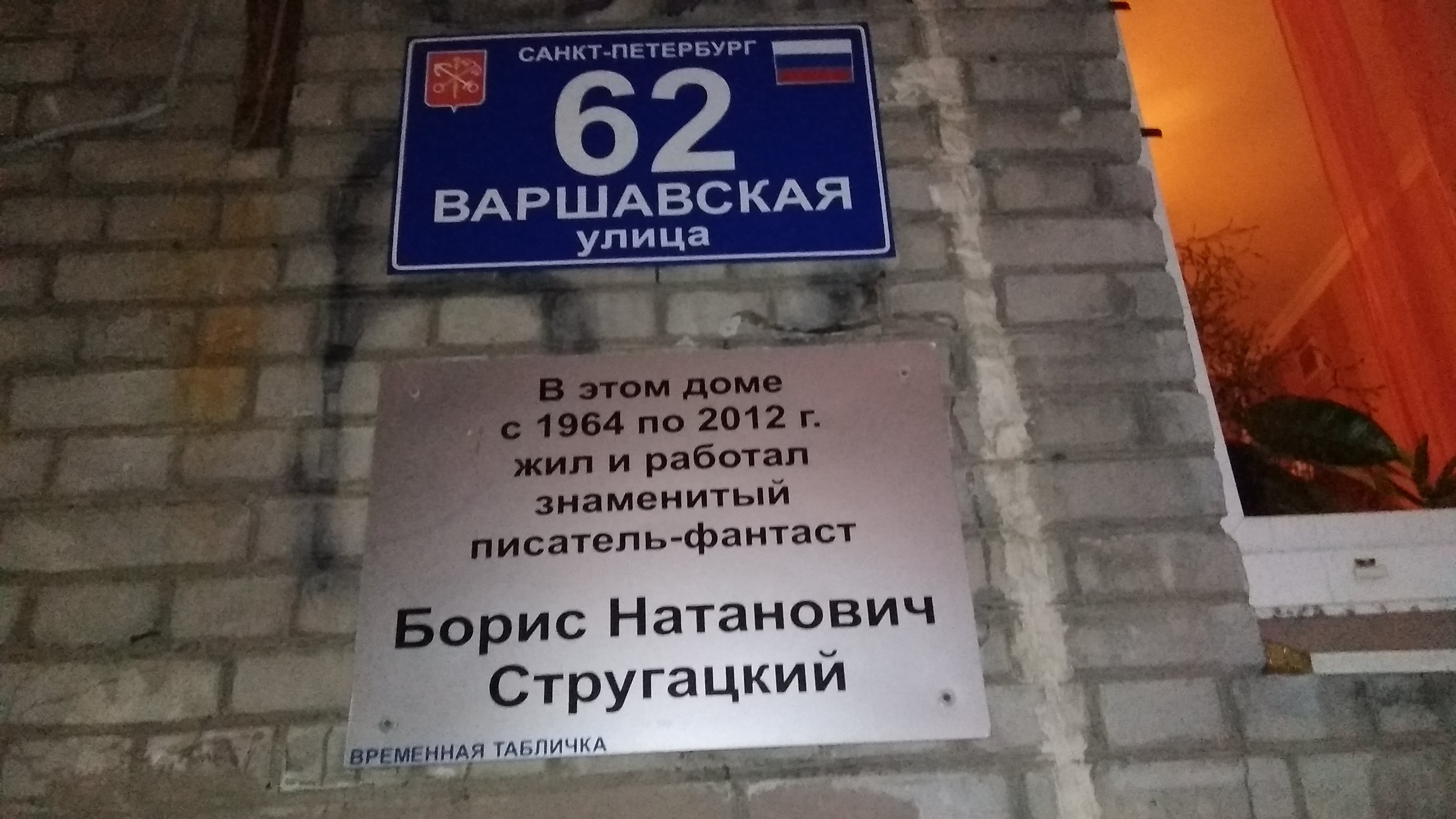
Temporary memorial plaque in Saint Petersburg

In 1959, the novella The Land of Crimson Clouds won third prize in a competition for the best book on science and technology for schoolchildren, organized by the Ministry of Education of the RSFSR; the award was granted even before the book's publication. Until the early 1980s, the Strugatsky brothers received only public and amateur awards, such as the prize from the "Under the Integral" club (Novosibirsk Akademgorodok) for the best work about young scientists (1965, Monday Begins on Saturday) or the "Fant" awards from the KLF in Khabarovsk for the novellas A Billion Years Before the End of the World (1976) and Beetle in the Anthill (1981). Various science fiction fan clubs regularly awarded the Strugatskys prizes in the following decade. After the establishment of the Aelita award in 1981 by the editorial board of the magazine Ural Pathfinder and the Council for Adventure and Science Fiction Literature of the Union of Writers of the RSFSR, the Strugatskys became its first laureates for the novella Beetle in the Anthill. In 1986, Arkady and Boris Strugatsky were awarded the RSFSR State Prize named after Maxim Gorky, and in the same year, B. N. Strugatsky shared the RSFSR State Prize named after the Vasilyev Brothers for the screenplay of the film Letters from a Dead Man with director Konstantin Lopushansky and science fiction writer Vyacheslav Rybakov. In 1988 and 1989, the writers received reader sympathy awards at the "Great Ring" festival. In 1990, the Strugatskys were honored with the Alexander Belyaev Literary Prize by the Leningrad Writers' Organization for the novel Doomed City. The posthumously published novella by A. Strugatsky (under the pseudonym "S. Yaroslavtsev"), Devil Among People, received the "Interpresscon" award in 1994. In post-Soviet Russia, in 1999, Arkady (posthumously) and Boris Strugatsky were awarded the "Paladin of Science Fiction" prize by the Congress of Science Fiction Writers of Russia and the CIS, and in 2000, the Strannik award in a similar category. The Strugatsky brothers were laureates of the "Symbol of Science" medal for 2007.

The Strugatsky brothers were among the few Soviet science fiction writers widely recognized and awarded by Western literary institutions and conventions. In 1977, the English translation of the novella Roadside Picnic was honored with the John W. Campbell Memorial Award for Best Science Fiction Novel by the "Science Fiction Writers of America" as the best work of the year. In 1978, the Strugatskys were elected honorary members of the Mark Twain Society (USA) "for outstanding contributions to world literature". In 1979, the brothers received the Jules Verne Prize from the Scandinavian Science Fiction Congress in Sweden, and in 1982, they were inducted into the Hall of Fame at Eurocon in Mönchengladbach. Roadside Picnic won the "Golden Demon" prize for the best foreign book at the Sixth French Science Fiction Festival in Metz in 1981. The writers were recognized at Eurocon in Montpellier in 1987 and received a special award from the World Science Fiction Organization for "Independence of Thought" at the 45th Science Fiction Convention in Brighton. The Strugatskys were also inducted into the Hall of Fame at Eurocon in Freudenstadt (1992).

An asteroid, No. 3054, discovered on 11 September 1977, at the Crimean Astrophysical Observatory, was named after the Strugatskys. The name was approved by the Minor Planet Center in 1985.

In 1994, the literary online contest "Teneta" was launched—the first in the Russian segment of the Internet. Boris Strugatsky participated in the jury of the 1997 contest, sparking criticism for his judging results (notably the "discovery" of the marginal writer Bayan Shiryanov). The writer himself stated that the level of the contest works he reviewed was "professional (indistinguishable from the average level of a typical modern magazine)," rating it higher than the writers' seminar he led. However, Boris Natanovich believed that "network literature, of course, has no special future and cannot have one by definition".

Since 1998, the literary ABS Prize has been awarded, established personally by B. N. Strugatsky. Shortly before his death in 2012, the Strugatsky Brothers Foundation was created, with S. Arno as its executive director and administrator of the prize. In 2024, the awarding of the prize was suspended due to Andrei Strugatsky (son of Boris Strugatsky) stepping down as chairman of the Foundation, as well as the death of the ABS Prize's executive secretary, N. M. Romanetsky.

In 2011, the Mikhail Prokhorov Foundation, which established the literary prize "NOS," launched the "NOS-1973" project, which considered texts written or first published in 1973. The shortlist, among works by fifteen writers (including Nabokov and Trifonov), included the Strugatskys' novella Roadside Picnic. Jury member Vladislav Tolstov, (Note: Vladislav Alexandrovich Tolstov (born 1968) – Russian journalist. Worked in editorial offices in Norilsk, Krasnoyarsk, Irkutsk, Moscow, and elsewhere. Author of several books on the history of Norilsk, Eastern Siberia, and the Upper Volga region.) explaining the discrepancy between the jury's choice and reader voting on the prize's website (the jury selected Sinyavsky's Strolls with Pushkin, experts chose Moscow-Petushki, and online voters picked Sandro of Chegem), noted:

...from the nauseatingly official literary lineup that was Soviet literature in 1973, the books by the Strugatskys, Iskander, and Shukshin stand out above all. Because they were read, exchanged, stolen from libraries, cut out from thick magazines, and rebound. Discussed. Remembered. That's important. But Terts — they don't remember. They just don't, and that's it. And they don't reprint him for that reason.

Jury member Aleksey Levinson noted that the selected books "did not distance readers from life but allowed them to live it, making it acceptable. They played an interesting role in reconciling the reader with their everyday reality." The Strugatskys' Roadside Picnic was called "hyperreal," while the world of Chegem was an "extrareality." In any case, these books (including the "alcoholic world" of V. Erofeev) defended a system of true values, distinguishing them "from pulp fiction that leads to a world of values the reader cannot and will not adhere to in life".

In April 2024, a presentation was held for Vasily Vladimirsky's project "A World Without the Strugatskys". The brief given to the anthology's authors was roughly as follows:

The Strugatskys never existed, but modern Russian science fiction emerged nonetheless. Which Soviet non-science fiction writers could have acted as its founders? Conceive and write a science fiction text for that author.

The results of the experiment elicited mixed reactions from critics.

In 2014, a square in Saint Petersburg, near Boris Strugatsky's home, was named after the writers. In 2015, plans were made to create a museum in Boris Strugatsky's Saint Petersburg apartment, but by 2023, the exact opening date and location of the museum remained unknown. In 2023, a memorial plaque was installed on the building in Saint Petersburg on Pobedy Street, where Boris Strugatsky lived.

== See also ==
- Yefremov's School
- Strugatsky's high theory of upbringing

== Bibliography ==
=== Dictionary-encyclopedic publications ===
- Arzamastseva, I. N. (2000). "Стругацкие, Аркадий Натанович и Борис Натанович" [Strugatsky, Arkady Natanovich and Boris Natanovich]. In Nikolaev P. A. (ed.). Русские писатели XX века: Биографический словарь [Russian Writers of the 20th Century: Biographical Dictionary]. Moscow: Big Russian Encyclopedia; Rendezvous. pp. 669–671. ISBN 5-85270-289-7.
- Gritsanov, A. A. (2003). "Стругацкие" [Strugatsky]. Социология: Энциклопедия [Sociology: Encyclopedia]. World of Encyclopedias. Minsk: Knizhnyi Dom. ISBN 985-428-619-3.
- Gromova, A. G. (1972). "Стругацкие" [Strugatsky]. In Surkov A. A. (ed.). Краткая литературная энциклопедия [Short Literary Encyclopedia]. Vol. 7: «Sovetskaya Ukraina» — Fliakki. Moscow: Soviet Encyclopedia. pp. 227–228.
- Kazakov, V.; Kerzin, A.; Fleishman, Yu. (1999). "Библиография. От составителей. Художественные произведения" [Bibliography. From the Compilers. Fiction Works]. In Borisov V. (ed.). Миры братьев Стругацких. Энциклопедия: Том 2 [Worlds of the Strugatsky Brothers. Encyclopedia: Volume 2]. Worlds of the Strugatsky Brothers. Moscow, St. Petersburg: AST, Terra Fantastica. pp. 419–460. ISBN 5-237-01562-X.
- Kozhevnikov V. M., ed. (1987). "Стругацкие" [Strugatsky]. Литературный энциклопедический словарь [Literary Encyclopedic Dictionary]. Moscow: Soviet Encyclopedia. pp. 705–706.
- Mineralov, Yu. I. (1997). "Стругацкий Аркадий Натанович (1925—1991). Стругацкий Борис Натанович (р. 1933)" [Strugatsky Arkady Natanovich (1925—1991). Strugatsky Boris Natanovich (b. 1933)]. Русские детские писатели XX века [Russian Children's Writers of the 20th Century] (Biobibliographic dictionary). Moscow: Flinta, Nauka. pp. 427–430. ISBN 5-89349-010-X.
- Lutz, R. C. (1997). "Arkady Strugatsky and Boris Strugatsky". In Magill F. N. (ed.). Cyclopedia of World Authors. Vol. 5: Sim—Z. Pasadena, Calif.: Salem Press. pp. 1947–1948. ISBN 0-89356-449-4.

=== Dissertations ===
- Bardasova, E. V. (1995). Концепция возможных миров в свете эстетического идеала писателей-фантастов А. и Б. Стругацких [The Concept of Possible Worlds in the Light of the Aesthetic Ideal of Science Fiction Writers A. and B. Strugatsky] (Dissertation for the degree of Candidate of Philological Sciences : 10.01.01). Kazan.
- Demkina, A. V. (2022). Конструирование возможного будущего в позднесоветской интеллектуальной культуре 1980-х — начала 1990-х гг.: на примере фантастической литературы [Constructing a Possible Future in Late Soviet Intellectual Culture of the 1980s – Early 1990s: The Case of Fantastic Literature] (Dissertation for the degree of Candidate of Cultural Studies 24.00.01). Moscow: Russian State University for the Humanities.
- Kuznetsova, A. V. (2004). Рецепция творчества братьев Стругацких в критике и литературоведении : 1950—1990-е гг [Reception of the Strugatsky Brothers' Work in Criticism and Literary Studies: 1950s–1990s] (Thesis). Moscow.
- Miloslavskaya, V. V. (2008). Творчество А. и Б. Стругацких в контексте эстетических стратегий постмодернизма [The Work of A. and B. Strugatsky in the Context of Postmodern Aesthetic Strategies] (Dissertation for the degree of Candidate of Philological Sciences. 10.01.01 — Russian Literature). Stavropol.
- Neronova, I. V. (2015). Художественный мир и его конструирование в творчестве А. Н. и Б. Н. Стругацких 1980-х годов [The Artistic World and Its Construction in the Work of A. N. and B. N. Strugatsky in the 1980s] (PDF) (Specialty 10.01.01 — Russian Literature (Philological Sciences); Dissertation for the degree of Candidate of Philological Sciences). Yaroslavl: Yaroslavl State University named after P. G. Demidov.
- Telpov, R. E. (2008). Особенности языка и стиля прозы братьев Стругацких [Features of the Language and Style of the Strugatsky Brothers' Prose] (Thesis). Moscow: Moscow Pedagogical State University.
- Frolov, A. V. (2016). Трансформация мироощущения героя и автора в процессе творческой эволюции Аркадия и Бориса Стругацких («Далёкая Радуга» — «Улитка на склоне» — «Град обреченный») [Transformation of the Worldview of the Hero and Author in the Process of Creative Evolution of Arkady and Boris Strugatsky ("Far Rainbow" — "Snail on the Slope" — "Doomed City")] (Dissertation for the degree of Candidate of Philological Sciences: 10.01.01). Bryansk.

=== Articles ===
- Amusin, M. (1988). "Далеко ли до будущего?" [How Far to the Future?]. Neva (2): 153–160.
- Amusin, M. F. (2000). "Стругацкие и фантастика текста" [Strugatskys and the Fiction of the Text]. Zvezda (7): 208–216.
- Amusin, M. F. (2005). "Стругацкие и принцип неопределенности" [Strugatskys and the Uncertainty Principle]. Neva (4): 190–200.
- Amusin, M. F. (2022). "Арканар / Вестерос: трудно быть человеком" [Arkanar / Westeros: It's Hard to Be Human]. Znamya (2): 175–185.
- Breeva, T. N. (2015). "Деконструкция утопического дискурса в цикле произведений братьев Стругацких «Мир Полудня»" [Deconstruction of Utopian Discourse in the Cycle of Works by the Strugatsky Brothers "Noon Universe"]. Izvestiya Ural Federal University. Series 2: Humanities. 136 (1): 226–235.
- Burya, Victor. "Родные и крестные отцы «бикинийской» истории" [The fathers and godfathers of the "Bikini" story]. Журнальный мир (in Russian).
- Vasyuchenko, I. (May 1989). "Отвергнувшие воскресенье. (Заметки о творчестве Аркадия и Бориса Стругацких)" [Those Who Rejected Sunday. (Notes on the Work of Arkady and Boris Strugatsky)]. Znamya (5): 216–225.
- Zerkalov, A. (1991). "Игра по собственным правилам" [Playing by One's Own Rules]. Стругацкий А., Стругацкий Б. Собрание сочинений [Strugatsky A., Strugatsky B. Collected Works]. Vol. 1: Novellas and Stories. From Outside. Path to Amalthea. Interns. Stories. Moscow: Tekst. pp. 5–18. ISBN 5-87106-007-2.
- Kaspe, I. "Смысл (частной) жизни, или Почему мы читаем Стругацких?" [The Meaning (of Private) Life, or Why Do We Read the Strugatskys?]. New Literary Review, 2007, №6. Magazine Hall.
- Kern, G. "Иван Ефремов и братья Стругацкие: модели и анти-модели российской научной фантастики" [Ivan Yefremov and the Strugatsky Brothers: Models and Anti-Models of Russian Science Fiction]. Archive of Yefremov's Publications and Materials about Him.
- Komissarov, V. V. (2008). "От «желающих странного» до «выродков»: трансформация образа интеллигенции в творчестве А. Н. и Б. Н. Стругацких" [From "Those Who Desire the Strange" to "Degenerates": Transformation of the Image of the Intelligentsia in the Work of A. N. and B. N. Strugatsky]. Intelligentsia and the World (3): 96–107.
- Kukulin, I. (29 February 2008). "Альтернативное социальное проектирование в советском обществе 1960-1970-х годов, или Почему в современной России не прижились левые политические практики" [Alternative Social Design in Soviet Society of the 1960s-1970s, or Why Left-Wing Political Practices Did Not Take Root in Modern Russia]. New Literary Review. Polit.ru.
- Kukulin, I. "Философия Стругацких" [The Philosophy of the Strugatskys]. Russian Literature of the 20th Century. Season 2. Arzamas.
- Lisovitskaya, V. N. (2022). "Поиск «другого» в прозе братьев Стругацких 50-х годов" [The Search for the 'Other' in the Prose of the Strugatsky Brothers in the 1950s]. Kultura i tekst. 1 (48): 57–67. doi:10.37386/2305-4077-2022-1-57-67.
- Mezhuev, B. (19 January 2009). "Повесть о просвещённом авторитаризме" [A Tale of Enlightened Authoritarianism]. Russian Journal. INTELROS – Intellectual Russia.
- Mezhuev, B. (28 November 2012). "Тайна «Мира Полдня»" [The Secret of the "Noon Universe"]. Gefter.
- Neronova, I. V. (2016). Раннее творчество братьев Стругацких: поиск индивидуального стиля [Early Work of the Strugatsky Brothers: Search for Individual Style]. Problems of Historical Poetics. 14 (4): 222–235. doi:10.15393/j9.art.2016.3746. ISSN 1026-9479.
- Osenev, I. A. (11 April 2022). "Фантастика нашего времени: новейшие собрания сочинений братьев Стругацких" [Science Fiction of Our Time: The Latest Collected Works of the Strugatsky Brothers]. Science in the Metropolis, №4 (39). Moscow City University MGPU.
- Rats M., Khromchenko M. (2008). "О методологии Г. П. Щедровицкого и «прогрессорстве» А. Н. и Б. Н. Стругацких" [On the Methodology of G. P. Shchedrovitsky and the "Progressorism" of A. N. and B. N. Strugatsky]. New Literary Review. Magazine Hall.
- Serbinenko, V. (May 1989). "Три века скитаний в мире утопии. Читая братьев Стругацких" [Three Centuries of Wandering in the World of Utopia. Reading the Strugatsky Brothers]. Novy Mir (5): 242–255.
- Snigirev, A. V. (2015). "«Астронавты» в «Стране багровых туч»: ещё раз о проблеме «Стругацкие — Лем»" ["Astronauts" in "The Land of Crimson Clouds": Once Again on the Problem "Strugatsky — Lem"]. Ural Philological Bulletin. Series: Russian Literature of the 20th–21st Centuries: Directions and Currents (2): 175–182.
- Snigirev, A. V. (2021). "Братья Стругацкие: Приемы моделирования автомифа" [The Strugatsky Brothers: Techniques for Modeling an Auto-Myth]. Philology and Culture. 1 (63): 208–213. doi:10.26907/2074-0239-2021-63-1-208-213.
- Suvin, D. (2009). "Творчество братьев Стругацких" [The Work of the Strugatsky Brothers]. Lib.ru/Fantastika. Translated by Alla Kuznetsova. originally "The Literary Opus of the Strugatskii Brothers". Canadian-American Slavic Studies. VIII (3): 454–463. Fall 1974.
- Frolov, A. V. ""Мир "Полудня" Аркадия и Бориса Стругацких и мир "Туманности Андромеды" Ивана Ефремова: тематика, идеи, традиции"" [The "Noon Universe" of Arkady and Boris Strugatsky and the World of Ivan Yefremov's "Andromeda Nebula": Themes, Ideas, Traditions]. Daniil Kharms.
- Shavshin, M. S. "К вопросу влияния на творчество братьев Стругацких" [On the Question of Influence on the Work of the Strugatsky Brothers]. LitMir.

=== Monographs ===
- Amusin, M. F. (1996). Братья Стругацкие : очерк творчества [The Strugatsky Brothers: An Essay on Their Work]. Jerusalem: Beseder. p. 187. ISBN 965-7031-06-0.
- Britikov, A. F. (2005). Отечественная научно-фантастическая литература (1917—1991 годы) [Domestic Science Fiction Literature (1917—1991)]. Vol. 1: Science Fiction — A Special Kind of Art (2nd edition, corrected ed.). St. Petersburg: Borey-Art. p. 308.
- Vishnevsky, B. L. (2022). Двойная звезда: Миры братьев Стругацких [Double Star: Worlds of the Strugatsky Brothers]. St. Petersburg: Dom Galicha. p. 456.
- Volodihin, D. M.; Prashkevich, G. M. (2012). Братья Стругацкие. Мечты о несбывшемся [The Strugatsky Brothers. Dreams of the Unfulfilled]. Lives of Remarkable People, issue 1331. Moscow: Molodaya gvardiya. p. 350. ISBN 978-5-235-03475-4. Reissue: «Molodaya gvardiya», 2023 (Biografika: Klassika), ISBN 978-5-235-05056-3.
- Kaitokh, V. (2003). "Братья Стругацкие" [The Strugatsky Brothers]. Стругацкий А. Н., Стругацкий Б. Н. Собрание сочинений. В 11 т [Strugatsky A. N., Strugatsky B. N. Collected Works. In 11 vols]. Vol. 12, additional. Translated by V. Borisov (from Polish). Donetsk: Stalker. pp. 409–638. ISBN 966-696-215-2.
- Komissarov, V. V. (2017). «Этого ожидали…»: Роман И. А. Ефремова «Туманность Андромеды» и футуристические проекты советской интеллигенции ["This Was Expected...": I. A. Yefremov's Novel "Andromeda Nebula" and Futuristic Projects of the Soviet Intelligentsia]. Ivanovo: PresSto. p. 116. ISBN 978-5-9909681-0-3.
- Kulanov, A. E. (2016). Роман Ким [Roman Kim]. Lives of Remarkable People. Issue 1789 (1589). Moscow: Molodaya gvardiya. p. 413. ISBN 978-5-235-03893-6.
- Nadezhkina, T. O. (2010). Три мифа Стругацких: монография [Three Myths of the Strugatskys: Monograph]. Vladivostok: Admiral G. I. Nevelskoy Maritime State University. p. 197. ISBN 978-5-8343-0591-0.
- Miloslavskaya, V. V. (2014). Творчество А. и Б. Стругацких в контексте эстетических стратегий постмодернизма : монография [The Work of A. and B. Strugatsky in the Context of Postmodern Aesthetic Strategies: Monograph]. Stavropol: SKFU Publishing House. p. 157. ISBN 978-5-88648-912-5.
- Potts, S. W. (17 February 2009). "Второе нашествие марксиан: Беллетристика братьев Стругацких" [The Second Marxian Invasion: The Fiction of the Strugatsky Brothers]. Potts Stephen W. The Second Marxian Invasion: The Fiction of the Strugatsky Brothers. San-Bernardino: The Borgo Press, 1991. Translation by A. Kuznetsova. Moshkov Library.
- Prosvetov, I. (2015). «Крёстный отец» Штирлица [The "Godfather" of Stierlitz]. Classified Stamp Removed. Moscow: Veche. p. 317. ISBN 978-5-4444-2766-8.
- Revich, Vsevolod (1998). "«Фантастика — это не жанр, это способ мыслить»" ["Science Fiction is Not a Genre, It's a Way of Thinking"]. Перекрёсток утопий. Судьбы фантастики на фоне судеб страны [Crossroads of Utopias. The Fates of Science Fiction Against the Background of the Country's Fates]. Moscow: Institute of Oriental Studies RAS. pp. 244–286. ISBN 5-89282-092-0.
- Skalandis, A. (2008). Братья Стругацкие [The Strugatsky Brothers]. Moscow: AST. p. 702. ISBN 978-5-17-052684-0.
- Strugatsky, A.; Strugatsky, B. (2015). Svetlana Bondarenko; Viktor Kurilsky; Yuri Fleishman (eds.). Полное собрание сочинений в тридцати трёх томах [Complete Collected Works in Thirty-Three Volumes]. Vol. 1: 1941—1957. Group "Lyudeny". p. 416.
- Strugatsky, A.; Strugatsky, B. (2020). Svetlana Bondarenko, Viktor Kurilsky (compilers) (ed.). Полное собрание сочинений в тридцати трёх томах [Complete Collected Works in Thirty-Three Volumes]. Vol. 31: 1997—2000. Group "Lyudeny". p. 598.
- Urban, A. A. (1972). "От техники к человеку" [From Technology to Man]. Фантастика и наш мир [Science Fiction and Our World]. Leningrad: Soviet Writer. pp. 158–211.
- T. A. Snigireva; A. V. Podchinenov, eds. (2017). Феномен творческого кризиса: монография [The Phenomenon of Creative Crisis: Monograph]. Yekaterinburg: Ural University Publishing House. p. 398. ISBN 978-5-7996-2239-8.
- Howell, Y. (2021). Апокалиптический реализм: Научная фантастика Аркадия и Бориса Стругацких [Apocalyptic Realism: The Science Fiction of Arkady and Boris Strugatsky]. Contemporary Western Rusistika. Translated by E. Nesterova (from English). St. Petersburg: BiblioRossica. p. 192. ISBN 978-5-6044709-2-3.
- Chernyakhovskaya, Yu. (2016). Братья Стругацкие: письма о будущем [The Strugatsky Brothers: Letters about the Future]. Moscow: Knizhnyi mir. p. 384. ISBN 978-5-8041-0878-7. Foreword: B. Mezhuev: The Atlantis We Lost.
- Shavshin, M. (2015). Стругацкие. Всплеск в тишине : литературно-критические эссе [Strugatskys. A Splash in the Silence: Literary-Critical Essays]. St. Petersburg: Anima. p. 287. ISBN 978-5-9907020-0-4.
