= Search for Destiny or the Twenty Seventh Theorem of Ethics =

1994 SF novel by Boris Strugatsky

Search for Destiny, or the Twenty Seventh Theorem of Ethics (Russian: Поиск предназначения, или Двадцать седьмая теорема этики) — is a 1994 science fiction novel by Boris Strugatsky (under the pseudonym S. Vititsky), covering the life of a fictional Soviet citizen Krasnogorov with light and bitter truth about that time and including the long chapter "A Happy Boy" about his childhood in sieged Leningrad. The last part depicts him as a ruler in future Russia.

At one point Krasnogorov realizes that he survived numerous situations, which inevitably had to result in his death. This causes him to think he has a special destiny, which doesn't allow him to die, and he keeps searching for it, often discussing the idea with his long-time friend Viktor Kikonin. Coincidentally, Krasnogorov had always been the one who could save Viktor from near-death situations just by staying close to him...
