= Roadside Picnic =

1972 novel by Arkady and Boris Strugatsky

- Book cover of English translation (also featuring Tale of the Troika)
- Author: Arkady and Boris Strugatsky
- Original title: Пикник на обочине
- Translator: Antonina W. Bouis
- Cover artist: Richard M. Powers
- Language: Russian
- Genre: Science fiction
- Publisher: Macmillan (United States)
- Publication date: 1972
- Publication place: Soviet Union
- English publication date: 1977
- Media type: Print (Hardcover)
- Pages: 245 pp
- ISBN: 0-02-615170-7
- OCLC: 2910972

Roadside Picnic (Russian: Пикник на обочине, romanized: Piknik na obochine, IPA: [pʲɪkˈnʲik nɐ ɐˈbot͡ɕɪnʲe]) is a philosophical science fiction novel by the Soviet authors Arkady and Boris Strugatsky. It was written in 1971 and published in 1972, and is their most popular and most widely translated novel outside the former Soviet Union. As of 2003, Boris Strugatsky counted 55 publications of Roadside Picnic in 22 countries.

The story was published in English in a translation by Antonina W. Bouis. A preface to the first American edition was written by Theodore Sturgeon. Stanisław Lem wrote an afterword to the German edition of 1977.

Another English translation by Olena Bormashenko was published in 2012, with a foreword by Ursula K. Le Guin and an afterword by Boris Strugatsky.

The book has been the source of many adaptations and other inspired works in a variety of media, including stage plays, video games, and television series. The 1979 film Stalker, directed by Andrei Tarkovsky, is loosely based on the novel, with a screenplay written by the Strugatsky brothers. Later, in 2007, S.T.A.L.K.E.R.: Shadow of Chernobyl, the first installment of a video game franchise taking inspiration from both the book and the film, was released as well.

The term stalker (сталкер) became a part of the Russian language and, according to the authors, became the most popular of their neologisms. In the book, stalkers are people who trespass into the forbidden area known as the Zone and steal its valuable extraterrestrial artifacts, which they later sell. In Russian, after Tarkovsky's film, the term acquired the meaning of a guide who navigates forbidden or uncharted territories; later on, urbexers and fans of industrial tourism, especially those visiting abandoned sites and ghost towns, were also called stalkers.

== Setting ==
Roadside Picnic is set in the aftermath of an extraterrestrial event, the Visitation, which occurred simultaneously in several locations around the Earth over a two-day period. Neither the Visitors themselves nor their means of arrival or departure were ever seen by the local populations, who lived inside the relatively small areas, each a few square kilometers, of the six Visitation Zones. The Zones exhibit strange and dangerous phenomena that are not understood by humans and contain artifacts with inexplicable properties. The title of the novel derives from an analogy that is proposed by the character Dr. Valentine Pilman, who compares the Visitation to a picnic:

A picnic. Picture a forest, a country road, a meadow. Cars drive off the country road into the meadow, a group of young people get out carrying bottles, baskets of food, transistor radios, and cameras. They light fires, pitch tents, turn on the music. In the morning they leave. The animals, birds, and insects that watched in horror through the long night creep out from their hiding places. And what do they see? Old spark plugs and old filters strewn around... Rags, burnt-out bulbs, and a monkey wrench left behind... And of course, the usual mess—apple cores, candy wrappers, charred remains of the campfire, cans, bottles, somebody’s handkerchief, somebody’s penknife, torn newspapers, coins, faded flowers picked in another meadow.

In this analogy, the nervous animals are the humans who venture forth after the Visitors have left, discovering items and anomalies that are ordinary to those who have discarded them, but incomprehensible or deadly to the earthlings. The explanation implies that the Visitors may not have paid any attention to or even noticed Earth's inhabitants during their visit, just as many humans do not notice or pay attention to insects and wildlife during a picnic. The artifacts and phenomena that are left behind by the Visitors in the Zones were garbage, which are discarded and forgotten without any intentions to advance or damage humanity. There is little chance that the Visitors will return again because for them it was a brief stop, for reasons unknown, on the way to their actual destination.

== Plot ==
=== Background ===
The novel is set in a post-Visitation world in which there are now six zones that are known on Earth to be full of unexplained phenomena with strange happenings having briefly occurred. They are assumed to have been Visitations by aliens. Governments and the United Nations, fearful of unforeseen consequences, try to keep tight control over them to prevent leakage of artifacts from the Zones. A subculture of stalkers, scavengers who go into the zones to steal the artifacts for profit, has evolved around the zones. The novel is set in and around a specific zone in Harmont, a fictitious town in an unspecified English-speaking country, and follows the protagonist over the course of eight years.

=== Introduction ===
The introduction is a live radio interview with Dr. Pilman, who is credited with the discovery that the six Visitation Zones' locations were not random. He explains it so: "Imagine that you spin a huge globe and you start firing bullets into it. The bullet holes would lie on the surface in a smooth curve. The whole point (is that) all six Visitation Zones are situated on the surface of our planet as though someone had taken shots at Earth from a pistol located somewhere along the Earth–Deneb line. Deneb is the main star in Cygnus."

=== Section 1 ===
The story revolves around Redrick "Red" Schuhart, a brutal and experienced young stalker who regularly enters the Zone illegally at night in search of valuable artifacts for profit. Trying to clean up his act, he becomes employed as a lab assistant at the International Institute, which studies the Zone. To help the career of his boss, whom he considers a friend, he goes into the Zone with him on an official expedition to recover a unique artifact (a full "empty"), which later leads to his friend's death. That comes as a great shock when the news reaches Redrick, who is drunk in a bar, and he blames himself for his friend's fate. While Redrick is at the bar, a police force enters looking for stalkers. Redrick is forced to use a "shrieker" to make a hasty getaway. Red's girlfriend, Guta, is pregnant and decides to keep the baby no matter what. It is widely rumored that incursions into the Zone by stalkers carry high risk of mutations in their children even though no radiation or other mutagens have been detected in the area. They decide to marry.

=== Section 2 ===
Disillusioned, Redrick returns to stalking. In the course of his joint expedition into the Zone with a fellow stalker, named Burbridge (a.k.a. "The Vulture"), the latter steps into a substance known as "hell slime" (“witches jelly” in the older English translation), which slowly dissolves his leg bones. Amputation must be urgently performed to avoid certain death. Redrick pulls Burbridge out of the Zone, avoids the patrols, and drops him off at a surgeon. Later, Redrick is confronted by Burbridge's daughter, who gets angry with him for saving her father. Guta has given birth to a happy and intelligent daughter, who is fully normal but for having short light full body hair and black eyes. They lovingly call her the "Monkey”. Redrick meets with his clients in a posh hotel and sells them a fresh portion of the Zone artifacts, but what they are really after is "hell slime". It is hinted that they want it for military research. Redrick claims not to have it yet and leaves. Shortly afterward, Redrick is arrested but escapes. He then contacts his clients and tells them where he hid the "slime" sample that he had smuggled out. Redrick insists for all proceeds from the sale to be sent to Guta. He realizes that the "slime" will be used for some kind of weapon of mass destruction but decides that he has to provide for his family. He then gives himself up to the police.

=== Section 3 ===
Redrick's old friend Richard Noonan, a supply contractor with offices inside the Institute, is revealed as a covert operative of an unnamed presumably-governmental, secret organization working to stop the contraband outflow of artifacts from the Zone. Believing that he is nearing the successful completion of his multi-year assignment, he is confronted and scolded by his boss, who reveals to him that the flow is stronger than ever, and he is tasked with finding who is responsible and how they operate. It is revealed that the stalkers are now organized under the cover of the "weekend picnics-for-tourists" business set up by Burbridge. They jokingly refer to the setup as "Sunday school". Noonan meets with Dr. Valentine Pilman for lunch, and they have an in-depth discussion of the Visitation and humanity in general in which the idea of "Visitation as a roadside picnic" is articulated. Redrick is home again and has served his time. Burbridge visits him regularly and tries to entice him into some secret project, but Redrick declines. Guta is depressed because their daughter has nearly lost her humanity and ability to speak and more and more resembles an actual monkey. Redrick's dead father is also present and came home from the cemetery inside the Zone, as other very slow-moving (and completely harmless) reanimated dead are now returning to their homes all around town. They are usually destroyed by the authorities as soon as they are discovered. Redrick, however, had forcibly managed to defend his father from being taken away.

=== Section 4 ===
Redrick goes into the Zone one last time to reach the wish-granting "Golden Sphere". He has a map that was given to him by Burbridge, whose son, Arthur, joins him on the expedition. Redrick knows one of them has to die in order to temporarily deactivate an invisible phenomenon known as the "meatgrinder" for the other to reach the Sphere, but he keeps that a secret from Arthur, whom he intends to sacrifice. After they get to the location, having survived many obstacles, Arthur rushes towards the Sphere and shouts out selfless wishes for a better world, only to be savagely dispatched by the meatgrinder. With the Sphere in front of him, an exhausted Redrick looks back in confusion and bitterness on his whole life of struggle in a harsh world, and finds that he cannot articulate what he actually wants from the Sphere. He hopes the Sphere will look into his soul and "figure out" his wish because "it can't be bad." In the end he finds nothing better than to repeat the dead youth's words, "HAPPINESS FOR EVERYBODY, FREE OF CHARGE, AND MAY NO ONE BE LEFT BEHIND!"

== History ==
The story was written by the Strugatsky brothers in 1971. The first outlines were written January 18–27 in Leningrad, and the final version was completed between October 28 and November 3 in Komarovo. It was first published in the literary magazine Avrora in 1972, issues 7–10. Parts of it (Section 1) were published in Volume 25 of the Library of Modern Science Fiction in 1973. A Russian-language version endorsed by the Strugatsky brothers as the original was published in the 1970s.

By 1998, 38 editions of the novel had been published in 20 countries. The novel was first translated into English by Antonina W. Bouis. The preface to the first American edition of the novel (Macmillan, New York, 1977) was written by Theodore Sturgeon.

In 2012, a new English translation by Olena Bormashenko was published by Chicago Review Press in the US and Gollancz in the UK. She based her translation on a restored version by Boris Strugatsky, which was intended to return the novel to its state before the Soviet censors had made their alterations.

== Awards and nominations ==
- The novel was nominated for a John W. Campbell Award for best science fiction novel of 1978 and won second place.
- In 1978, the Strugatsky brothers were accepted as honorary members of the Mark Twain Society for their "outstanding contribution to world science fiction literature".
- A 1979 Scandinavian congress on science fiction literature awarded the Swedish translation the Jules Verne Prize for best novel of the year published in Swedish.
- In 1981, at the sixth Festival du Science Fiction in Metz, France, the novel won the award for best foreign book of the year.

== Adaptations and cultural influence ==
- A 1977 Czechoslovak TV miniseries Návštěva z Vesmíru (Visit from Space). After its TV premiere, all copies were destroyed by censors.
- A 1979 science fiction film, Stalker, directed by Andrei Tarkovsky, with a screenplay written by Boris and Arkady Strugatsky, is loosely based on the novel.
- Legendary 1980s Argentine post-punk band Don Cornelio y la Zona takes its name from "The Zone".
- While not a direct adaptation, the video game series S.T.A.L.K.E.R. is heavily influenced by Roadside Picnic. The first game in the series, S.T.A.L.K.E.R.: Shadow of Chernobyl, references many important plot points from the book, such as the wish granter and the unknown force blocking the path to the center of the zone. It also contains elements such as anomalies and artifacts that are similar to those described in the book, but that are created by a supernatural ecological disaster, not by alien visitors.
- The book is referenced in the post-apocalyptic video game Metro 2033. A character shuffles through a shelf of books in a ruined library and finds Roadside Picnic, he states that it is "something familiar". Metro 2033 was created by individuals who had worked on S.T.A.L.K.E.R. before founding their own video game development company. The game was based on a novel of the same name which also took influence from Roadside Picnic.
- The 1992 video game Star Control II references alien visitations with mysterious effects and the mosquito mange regarding the disappearance of the Androsynth.
- In 2003, the Finnish theater company Circus Maximus produced a stage version of Roadside Picnic, called Stalker. Authorship of the play was credited to the Strugatskys and to Mikko Viljanen and Mikko Kanninen.
- In the penultimate chapter of Red Plenty (2010), Francis Spufford's novelized history of Soviet economic ambitions in the 1960s, a character who has been reading Roadside Picnic sees it as a metaphor for the effort.
- A tabletop role-playing game in 2012 titled Stalker was developed by Ville Vuorela of Burger Games.
- M. John Harrison's novel Nova Swing (2007), which features a location called the 'Event Zone' where reality is skewed in various ways, can be seen to be influenced by Roadside Picnic.
- A Finnish low-budget indie film Vyöhyke (Zone), directed by Esa Luttinen, was released in 2012. The film is set in a Finnish visitation zone, and refers to material in the novel as well as the Tarkovsky film.
- Me Too, the final theatrical film by renowned Russian filmmaker Aleksei Balabanov from 2012, picks up several key plot points from the novel and has been described "a darkly humorous response to Roadside Picnic"
- British progressive rock band Guapo's 2013 album History of the Visitation, is based on the novel.
- The original Chinese title of the 2015 film Kaili Blues by director Bi Gan literally translates to "Roadside Picnic", which is the name of a book of poems written by Chen Sheng, one of the characters in the film. Bi Gan is heavily influenced by Andrei Tarkovsky, especially his film Stalker.
- In 2016, the US TV channel WGN America ordered a pilot for a TV adaptation, starring Matthew Goode and directed by Alan Taylor, but did not proceed to a series order.
- The 2016 video game The Final Station is partly based on the book, in which an alien "Visitation" occurred across several countries in the game. The Visitation devastated human society but also left some advanced technology to humanity.
- The documentary HyperNormalisation by Adam Curtis discusses the book and its role in questioning the realism of Soviet society.
- Japanese writer Iori Miyazawa's 2017 Otherside Picnic is a Yuri novel, manga and anime series in which two girls explore the "Otherside", a world of urban legend populated by ghosts of folklore.
- Annihilation, a 2018 science fiction psychological horror film, written and directed by Alex Garland, though based on the novel of the same name by Jeff VanderMeer, for some critics betrays obvious similarities to Roadside Picnic and Stalker.
- A skirmish wargame published in 2020 titled Zona Alfa featuring "skirmish rules for scavenging, exploring, and surviving in a near-future, post-apocalyptic Eastern European setting" in which players can "take on the role of bandits, mercenaries, and military units fighting over the blasted Exclusion Zone and its abandoned artefacts" was developed by Patrick Todoroff for Osprey Publishing.
- A VR game called Into The Radius is often compared to the VR equivalent of the S.T.A.L.K.E.R. series and is heavily influenced by the book.
- The Amazon Prime series Tales from the Loop, based on the book of the same title by Simon Stålenhag, is based on a similar premise to Roadside Picnic. In the series, there are many artefacts and phenomena scattered across the rural area surrounding the fictional town of Mercer, Ohio, which serve as critical plot devices. Abandoned metal spheres exhibiting strange effects lie abandoned in the woods; forest streams become inexplicably frozen or unfrozen, with time-altering effects; inter-dimensional rifts open and close; and an otherworldly, floating sphere, pulsing with seismic energy, is the target of scientific scrutiny. Each of these creates challenges for the characters, who seem at once bemused at, and accepting of, their existence.
- The British-American 2021 science fiction television series Debris explores a similar premise.
- The Brazilian-American 2024 video game Atomic Picnic draws inspiration from the tale, featuring elements like The Zone and scavenging referred to as Picnic.
- The 2024 video game Pacific Drive is set in the fictional Olympic Exclusion Zone, a Zone with similar anomalies to the ones in the novel.
- The 2024 videogame Grayzone Warfare features a rendered model of the novel placed throughout the in game world, with NPC's alluding to an unrevealed event having taken place on the game's fictional island setting of Lamang.
- The 2025 video game Atomfall includes exploring maps in an exclusion zone, fighting the military, looters, robots, and monsters resulting from the nuclear incident.
