= Tale of the Troika =

1968 novel by Boris and Arkaddy Strugatsky

Tale of the Troika (Сказка о Тройке) is a 1968 satirical science fiction novel by Russian writers Boris and Arkady Strugatsky, with illustrations by Yevgeniy Migunov. It criticises both Soviet bureaucracy and also to some extent the Soviet scientific environment. Although the novel itself is not directed against the state per se, it met with a cold official reaction during the Soviet era, was quite difficult to obtain, and circulated in samizdat reprints.

== Publication history ==
There are two first print versions of the tale, both of which are superficial sequels of Monday Begins on Saturday. One version, first published in 1987, in Smena, and therefore known as the "Smena version", can be viewed as a continuation of Monday Begins on Saturday, at the end of which the main character is told he will be sent to Kitezhgrad for a business trip, and that is where this version of Tale of the Troika takes place.

The other, abridged, version, first published in 1968, in Angara almanac (known as the "Angara version"), takes place in Tmuskorpion', (Note: Tmuskorpion', literally: "darkness-scorpion", is a pun with "Tmutarakan", which is a cliché for a remote, obscure place; tarakan means cockroach in modern Russian.) on a previously unexplored and unreachable floor of the Scientific Research Institute of Sorcery and Wizardry described in Monday Begins on Saturday.

The detailed history of the publications of the novel may be found in Boris Strugatski's memoirs, Comments on the Past.

In 1989 a combined variant was published, for the two-volume Selected Works, republished in 1992 in the first Complete Works edition.

In 2006, in the series Worlds of the Strugatsky Brothers, a draft dated March 25, 1967 was published.
