= The Doomed City =

1972 novel by Arkady and Boris Strugatsky

The Doomed City (Russian: Град обреченный) is a 1972 science fiction novel by Soviet writers Arkady and Boris Strugatsky. The title originates from an artwork by Nicholas Roerich which "astonished [the authors] a while ago with its gloomy beauty and the feeling of hopelessness radiating from it." The novel does not belong to the Strugatskys' Noon Universe, and it neither references nor is referenced by any of their other works.

== Plot summary ==
The novel is set in a mysterious world where enigmatic Mentors run a sociological experiment. The mentors gathered volunteers from Earth from various places and times: from Germany of the 1940s, the USA of the 1960s, Sweden of the 1970s, etc. The volunteers do not know the goals or conditions of the experiment. In spite of different native languages the people can effortlessly communicate with each other. Most of the people live in the City that is skirted by a swamp on one side and a desert on the other. Apparently, the experiment runs out of control, the City is shaken by a social unrest and an egalitarian system of job rotations is replaced by a dictatorship.

The main character — Andrei Voronin — is an astronomer from Leningrad of the 1950s. He struggles to find his identity and his place in the strange city, at first being a vehement opponent of the dictatorship, and later becoming a leading adviser of the dictator. Naively idealistic at the beginning of the novel, he seems to have become crass in the second half.

However, eventually, he leads an expedition to explore the desert. The expedition proves difficult in the extreme. The members are exhausted, they turn back or perish. Eventually, only Andrei and his skeptical friend Izia Katzman forge ahead. They encounter deserted cities and ruins of Earth cultures that show that the mysterious world is very old and humans have inhabited it for a long time.

As Andrei and Izia proceed, they ponder the strange world and the meaning of human existence. They run out of supplies, but they keep going on eager to learn what is beyond the "zero point". Andrei apparently dies on the border shooting at his double. He then finds himself back in the Leningrad of the 1950s, where his Mentor tells him that he passed the first circle, but "there are many of them ahead".

== History of creation and publication ==
The authors got the idea of The Doomed City in March 1969. At first, the novel was conceived as an autobiography. The authors say that they never worked longer or more diligently on any other of their works than on this novel. The draft of the novel was finished in 1972. After completion the authors shelved the draft as they did not hope to ever see the novel published. The political allusions, the spirit of despondency and its ideological vacuum made the novel unacceptable for the Soviet regime. Any attempted publication would have been stopped by the censors. The authors had initially hoped that by submitting the draft to publishing houses the people who read it would make copies and the novel might find readers through samizdat. The novel was finally published in 1989 after the controls on publishing were eased during Glasnost and Perestroika.

== Reviews ==
- Review [Polish] by Wojciech M. Chudziński (2000) in Świat Gier Komputerowych, #96
