= The Land of Crimson Clouds =

1959 novel by Boris and Arkady Strugatsky

The Land of Crimson Clouds (Russian: Страна багровых туч, romanized: Strana bagrovykh tuch) is a 1959 science fiction novel by Soviet writers Boris and Arkady Strugatsky.

== Plot summary ==
A spaceship, propelled by a prototype photon engine, sets off for Venus, which is then an enigmatic and unexplored planet that is covered by clouds. The tasks of the crew are to test the prototype engine in field conditions and to locate and set radio beacons on the so called "Uranium Golconda" (a place with incredibly large heavy metals deposits) that is presumably found somewhere on the second planet of the Solar System.

As the crew ventures into the depths of Venus, unknown dangers take them out one by one and so only four of six return home after they accomplished the mission, and all are badly damaged both physically and mentally. However, their feat was the first milestone in colonizing Venus and the first step into the 21st century.

== Tribute ==
On 23 July 2019, a Google Doodle was created to commemorate the 60th anniversary of the novel's publication.
