= The Way to Amalthea =

1960 novella by Boris and Arkady Strugatsky

"The Way to Amalthea" (Russian: Путь на Амальтею, romanized: Put' na Amal'teyu) is a science fiction novella by the Soviet writers Boris and Arkady Strugatsky, published in 1960 and written in 1959. An English translation, titled "Destination: Amaltheia", was published in a collection of the same name of Russian science fiction writers in 1963 by Foreign Languages Publishing House, Moscow.

== Plot summary ==
A cargo spaceship, propelled by a photon engine with a large reflective mirror ("sail"), visits the Jupiter system to deliver cargo to a staffed science station on Amalthea. Damaged by meteorites, the spaceship falls into Jupiter but survives the pressure and floats in the dense atmosphere. The crew manage to work around the damaged mirror and start the main engine to escape Jupiter and finally reach Amalthea.
