= The Second Invasion from Mars =

1968 novel by Arkadi and Boris Strugatsky

- Cover of the First English release
- Author: Arkady and Boris Strugatsky
- Original title: Второе нашествие марсиан
- Translator: Antonina W. Bouis
- Cover artist: Richard M. Powers
- Language: Russian
- Genre: Science fiction
- Publisher: NA: Macmillan
- Publication date: 1966
- Publication place: Soviet Union
- English publication date: 1979
- Media type: Print (Hardcover)
- ISBN: 0-02-615200-2
- OCLC: 4983091
- Dewey Decimal: 891.73/44 19
- LC Class: PG3476.S78835 D33 1979

The Second Invasion from Mars (Russian: Второе нашествие марсиан), subtitled Diary of a Sane [Person] (Russian: Записки здравомыслящего), is a relatively short 1966 science fiction novel by Arkady and Boris Strugatsky that portrays two weeks from the life of a common person in highly unusual circumstances. The novel raises the question of the balance between simple, basic needs such as food and stability, and the elevated spiritual values such as "pride of humanity", but rather than explicitly arguing either of the approaches, the novel simply shows that common person's reactions and visualizes his thoughts.

The subtitle of the novel, which may be more literally translated as "Diary of Healthy-Thinking", is a reference to the well known story "Diary of a Madman" by Nikolai Gogol.

== Plot summary ==
The story occurs in an unknown city and country, but almost certainly on Earth. All characters and few places mentioned have characteristically Greek names, but there is nothing specific to Greek culture in the plot; rather, use of neither Russian nor European names may have been an attempt to put the novel outside of the ideological war, which was extremely active at the time.

The main character, Apollon, is a retired school teacher living with his daughter (from a now-deceased wife) and housekeeper. He has presumably retired only very recently, as he is no longer working, but is not receiving pension yet. The subject of his pension is by far his most important worry during the entire two weeks described. His pension is about to be awarded, pending decision from the Minister about pension degree, and correspondingly, amount. The difference between first and third degree translate to him as the difference between not being able to afford anything that is not strictly needed, and being able to pursue his hobby (and the only other significant interest), stamp collecting.

At the same time, very strange things happen in the nearby city, and then in his town. Initially the unusual sounds and imagery generated considerable panic and even higher interest among the public, but gradually it becomes widely accepted, even if not understood, that the country (and, perhaps, entire planet) is being "invaded" by the Martians.

It is at this point that the reader is exposed to perhaps the most shocking, yet highly natural, reaction of the majority of the population. Rather than being extremely curious as to the exact information about an event that is happening for the first time in the entire history, most of the people, including Apollon who is portraying the views of the majority very well, seem only to be concerned about what this change means for them, in very practical terms. The main hero, for example, is worried about what this uncertainty will mean to his pension, and whether new stamps will be printed by the supposed new Martian government.

As the events unfold, it becomes clear that the invaders, whether they are Martians or not, value gastric juice for a completely unknown reason, and are willing to pay the considerable amount to any human that volunteers to donate it. This discovery gradually changes the overall mood in the town from cautious to very optimistic, and the citizens rejoice about the upcoming addition to their income. Again, no one cares as to why the Martians need such fluid, or even whether the reported invaders are Martians or extraterrestrials at all. The extra money, which is immediately used by many in a nearby bar, is alone more than sufficient to win the support of the majority of population.

The farmers are overjoyed as well. One of the first actions of the supposed new government was to buy (at a higher than normal price) all current harvest, whether fully grown or not, and to provide the farmers with a new variety of grain, which gives rise to blue bread. The new grain grows very fast, and the resulting bread, although possessing an unusual color, appears tasty and provides (as almost immediately becomes known) a very good source of moonshine. The government even provides the farmers with an advance towards the future purchase of the bread, thus completely turning them loyal.

== Movie ==
This novella heavily inspired a 1981 Polish movie The War of the Worlds: Next Century written and directed by Piotr Szulkin. Unlike the novella, it takes place in the city, its main protagonist being a popular newsreader, Iron Idem, who finds himself forced to spread the pro-Martian propaganda. The movie, as well as the original novel, were regarded as a covert satire of the societies living under communist regimes.
