= Klaus Hartmann =

Klaus Hartmann may refer to:

- Klaus Hartmann (painter) (1969–)
- Klaus Hartmann (philosopher) (1925–1991)
