= Lame Fate =

1986 Strugatsky Brothers' novel

- Author: Arkady and Boris Strugatsky
- Genre: Science fiction
- Published: Neva, 1986
- Publisher: Soviet Writer (1989)

Lame Fate (Russian: Хромая Судьба) is a novel by Arkady and Boris Strugatsky, a representative of realistic fantasy in their work, although it includes mystical elements. It was written during 1982, with the magazine publication following in 1986.

Both plot lines of the novel are dedicated to the relationships between an artist and the omnipotent state. The hero of the "Moscow" chapters (Felix Sorokin) is a not-so-young "writer of military-patriotic themes", many details of whose biography are inspired by the life path of Arkady Strugatsky. The hero of Sorokin's manuscript —writer Viktor Banev —lives in a state unknown historically and territorially and is unwelcome to the authorities. Felix Sorokin is mainly occupied with drinking with his writer friends and working on a tedious commissioned script; however, in that January week of 1982 when the action takes place, he encounters people and situations that seem to have come straight from the pages of his old manuscripts. First, he is forced to obtain an elixir of life for a neighbor; then he is mistaken for an extraterrestrial; and finally, in a café, the writer encounters a fallen angel offering to buy the score for the trumpets of the Last Judgment. Each of the numerous plots breaks off and in principle cannot have a resolution, but all these events prevent Sorokin from reaching the Institute of Linguistic Research, where he is obliged to present his manuscripts for study. In the evenings, Felix invariably returns to the Blue Folder—his main, most intimate text, not intended for publication.

In Banev's world (Blue Folder) — endless rain and a city populated by common folk, whose children are alienated from their parents by the "wet ones". These beings in masks are said to have a genetic disease, and yet they are supervised by military intelligence. Viktor Banev finds himself in this city essentially in exile, since the president himself has suggested to him to "stop strumming". Banev reasons extensively about the value of creativity and tries to actively figure out what is happening in the mysterious city. When Sorokin finally reaches the Institute, it turns out that an electronic machine capable of measuring the value of a writer's labor is installed there. The computer is operated by a certain Mikhail Afanasievich, who declares that his main mission is to ensure that the Blue Folder is completed and finished, and reads a finale that does not yet exist. Banev becomes a witness to the end of the old world and the onset of the new, sunny and bright one, in which alcohol and drugs turn into spring water, concrete fortresses collapse, and weapons rust. Banev is happy to witness all this, but the new world does not belong to him, and he must "not forget to return".

The main plot line —objective measurement of the writer's mastery— appears in the Strugatsky' work diary in 1971. However, the further ideas that led to the creation of Lame Fame were gradually developed starting from 1977. Work on the text was carried out in 1982. At the first stage, the content of Felix Sorokin's Blue Folder was the novel The Doomed City. In 1985, the co-authors decided to use the standalone novella Ugly Swans, created back in the 1960s but not published in the USSR, as the Blue Folder. The first publication in the magazine Neva (1986, Nos. 8 and 9), however, contained references to The Doomed City and had numerous censorship excisions due to the Gorbachev anti-alcohol campaign. Ugly Swans (under the title Time of Rain) was published in the magazine Daugava in 1987. The full edition, including the text of Ugly Swans alternating with chapters about Felix Sorokin and Banev, came out in 1989 and has been repeatedly reissued. In the "Worlds of the Strugatsky Brothers" series, Lame Fame and Ugly Swans were published separately. In the complete 33-volume collected works, both variants are presented: with inserts from The Doomed City and the final text.

== Plot ==
The novel consists of ten chapters with a linear plot. Since Lame Fame has two fable —the writer and his work— the chapters alternate. The Moscow chapters have odd numbering: "1. Felix Sorokin. Blizzard" (chapter 1), "3. Felix Sorokin. Adventure" (chapter 2), "5. Felix Sorokin. '...And Livestock!'" (chapter 3), "7. Felix Sorokin. 'Izpital'" (chapter 4), and "9. Felix Sorokin. '...Why Do You Keep Blowing That Trumpet, Young Man?'" (chapter 5). The text of "Ugly Swans" originally included 12 chapters and is arranged in the novel as follows: "2. Banev. In the Circle of Family and Friends" (original chapters 1–3), "4. Banev. Prodigies" (4–6), "6. Banev. Stirring to Activity" (7–8), "8. Banev. Ugly Swans" (chapters 9–11; the former title of the novella was transferred here), and "10. Banev. Exodus" (chapter 12).

=== Chapters about Sorokin ===
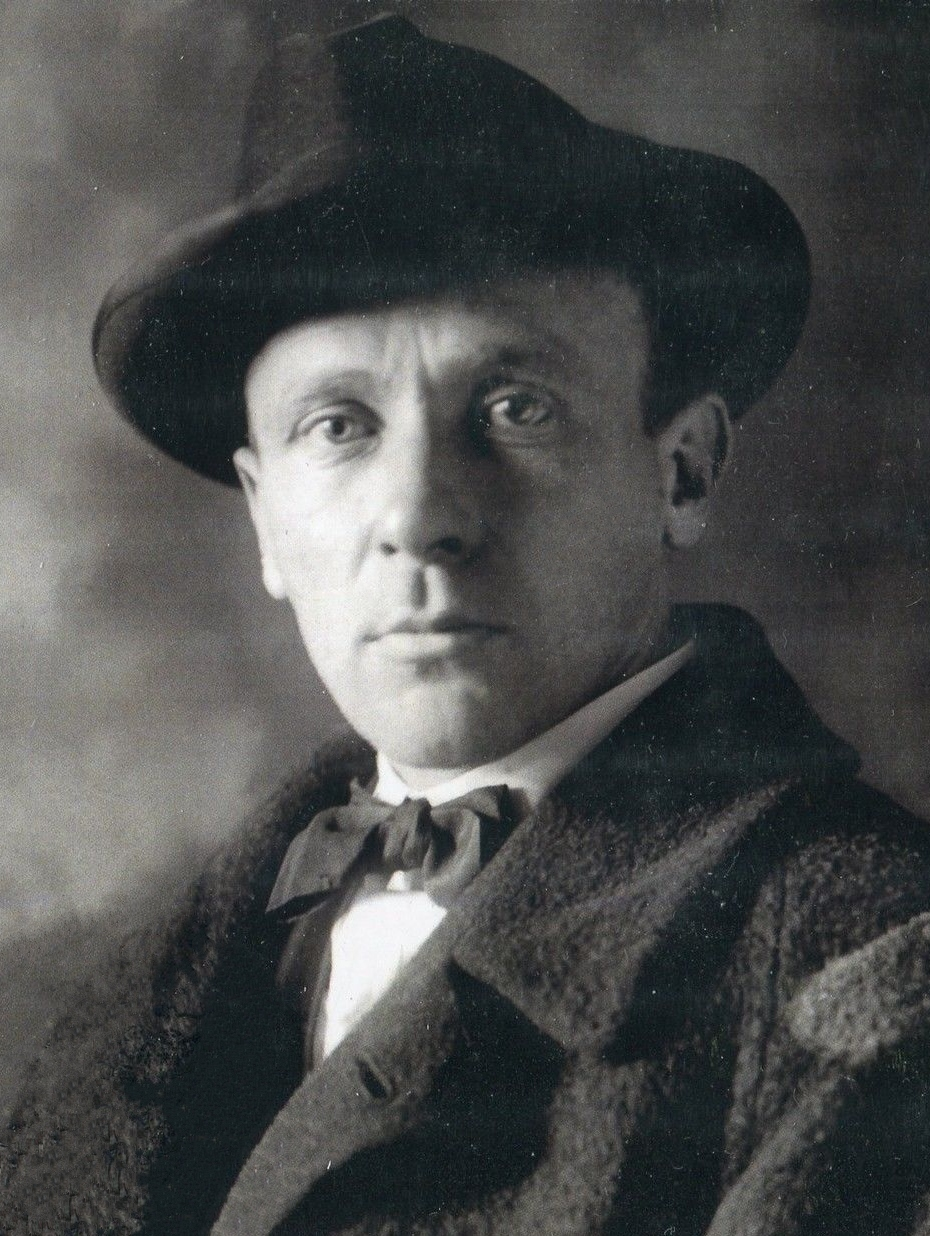
Mikhail Bulgakov — prototype of the "Izpital" operator

The main character is Felix Alexandrovich Sorokin, a member of the Union of Soviet Writers, a 56 years old prose writer and screenwriter. He is from Leningrad, and during the war graduated from the Military Institute of Foreign Languages, and served in Kamchatka. After demobilization and moving to Moscow, Sorokin became a military writer, known for his novella Comrade Officers and the play Eyes Front to the Center!, but at the time described, he writes scripts for military films to earn a living. Felix Alexandrovich is deeply dissatisfied with his own life and, reflecting on the fact that he miraculously did not die at the Kursk salient and spent his entire youth in the army, comes to the conclusion that he should not have written about the war and the military. He has long been divorced, his daughter Katka lives separately with her children, although she asks her father to obtain scarce goods through the Union of Writers, for example, a fur coat or collected works. Felix felt like a true creator once, when he dared to publish the fantastic Modern Fairy Tales, for which he was subjected to the most severe political purges and critical attacks, as a result of which he suffered a myocardial infarction. His personal life did not work out either: "F. Sorokin had...two or three women, and not a single love". He feels happy only when he takes the Blue Folder out of the cherished closet, in which lies the manuscript of a novel about a strange city where it is always raining. Sorokin understands that he is writing "for the drawer," that is, his manuscript will never be published during his lifetime for political and censorship reasons.

The main action begins in the January week of 1982, when the secretariat of the Union of Writers asked to provide samples of texts to a certain Institute of Linguistic Research "on Banya" for research in the field of information theory. Strange adventures begin immediately: on the stairwell, a neighbor-poet poisoned by canned food asks to obtain some "mafusallin", (Note: The name is reminiscent of the biblical patriarch Methuselah, who lived 969 years. That is, this is some kind of analog of "living water".) and Sorokin has to break through the fence into a mysterious restricted institute. When he reports the poet's request to the terrible Ivan Davydovich Martins (whom he compares to a vampire), a certain type in glasses and a checkered coat begins to follow the writer, and the poet himself, instead of gratitude, demands silence and threatens. Then Sorokin receives an anonymous letter stating that he is an alien from space, lost by "his own," but they promise to provide all possible assistance. When Felix decides to have breakfast in a café (having ordered a meat pot and beer in the morning), a strange hunchback giant with long blond hair approaches him, introducing himself as an angel exiled from heaven, and offering to buy the score of the trumpets of the Last Judgment. Sorokin passes the notes bought for five rubles to his neighbor-composer, but he pays no attention to them: "Spartak has lost again!" Next to the angel, the type in checkered appears again. Finally reaching Banya (the spy dozes in an empty corridor), Felix Sorokin learns that an electronic machine Izpital (Note: Abbreviation of "measurement of writerly talent".) is installed in the Institute, which is capable of calculating the "most probable number of readers" of a given manuscript, that is, predicting its future fate. Here Felix Sorokin recalls the story by Ryūnosuke Akutagawa Mensura Zoilii, which inspired a similar plot. The gray-eyed Mikhail Afanasievich works with Sorokin's old manuscripts, whom Felix initially does not recognize. In the finale, Sorokin, with his "last woman," the beauty Rita, goes to the writers' Club restaurant, where, stunned, he realizes who Mikhail Afanasyevich is. In their final conversation, it is clearly demonstrated that Felix's torments regarding the Blue Folder are meaningless: Mikhail Afanasyevich reads to Sorokin the finale of his novel that has not yet been written.

You should understand, Felix Alexandrovich, I don't care about your internal struggles, or your spiritual confusion, or your, forgive me, self-admiration. The only thing that interests me is your Blue Folder, so that your novel is written and finished. And how you do it, at what cost — that's not my concern as a literary scholar or biographer; honestly, it doesn't interest me. Of course, people tend to expect rewards for their labors and torments, and in general, that's fair, but there are exceptions: there is and cannot be a reward for creative torment. This torment itself contains the reward. Therefore, Felix Alexandrovich, do not expect light or peace. You will never earn either of them.

=== Chapters about Banev ===
In the novel from the Blue Folder, the fashionable capital writer Viktor Banev, due to his disrespect for the president, is forced to return to the city of his childhood. The authorities have ordered Viktor to "stop strumming." His ex-wife Lola and their teenage daughter Irma live in the city. It is constantly raining in the city, and the townsfolk associate this phenomenon with the "wet ones" or "spectacled ones" — strange people suffering from some genetic disease. Banev lives either in a hotel, where he drinks every evening in the restaurant, or in a sanatorium where his girlfriend-mistress Diana works as a nurse, sympathizing with the wet ones and supplying them with medicines. It turns out that her husband was once Zurzmansor — a famous philosopher who became a wet one. Banev spends his days talking with the chief physician of the leper colony (where the wet ones live) named Golem, the drunken artist Quadriga, and the sanitary inspector Pavor Summann. The latter sets Banev against the military, who, it turns out, patronize the wet ones, while the burgomaster patronizes the fascist young men — the so-called Legion. Chief physician Yul Golem claims that the wet ones are representatives of future humanity, a new genetic species, so they are oriented toward contacts with children, because adults have completely discredited themselves. The sanitary inspector turns out to be an employee of some special service collecting information about the wet ones and tries to kidnap one of them. Banev turns to counterintelligence and as a result receives a reward on behalf of the president; he can return to the capital. In the finale, events rush forward: all children leave their parents for the wet ones, who begin building a new world, and the rest of the city's residents have to evacuate. The rain stops, the sun rises, and under its rays the city evaporates. Golem tells Banev that there are no more wet ones, there won't be, and there weren't, and offers to leave, to which he receives the answer: "Why the hell do I need it if I don't look? This is my specialty—to look." Diana also stays with Banev: "Now I have no one left but this man". Irma and her prodigy friend Bol-Kunats appear grown up and full of happiness.

Diana laughed. Viktor looked at her and saw that it was another Diana, a completely new one, as she had never been before; he hadn't even suspected that such a Diana was possible — Happy Diana. And then he wagged his finger at himself and thought: all this is wonderful, but here's the thing, I must not forget to return.

== History of creation and publication ==
=== Artistic idea ===
Boris Strugatsky in his Comments on the Past dated the history of the creation of Lame Fame back to 1971. According to him, it was a "private" plot about a device capable of objectively evaluating the artistic value of a work. The Strugatskys' work diary from November 6, 1971, contains a brief note: A play about Menzura Zoili. The title derived from the Ryūnosuke Akutagawa's story; it was precisely in 1971 that Arkady Strugatsky was working in the editorial team compiling and translating selected works of this writer. Two variants of the plot plan for "Menzura" were created at the Komarovo writers' retreat between May 23 and June 3, 1972, when the co-authors were finishing The Doomed City. In January 1975, a brief entry was made in the work diary: "a man whom it was dangerous to offend" (the future Devil Among People); this text was initially intended to be titled Lame Fame. The next ideas were recorded in the authors' work diary only in 1977, when A. N. Strugatsky briefly outlined the conception of a "literary novel," and in the list of characters, most of the names were taken from the works of Vladimir Dudintsev and Mikhail Bulgakov. The idea related to Bulgakov proved fruitful, and in an offline interview on April 11, 2001, B. Strugatsky stated that Felix Sorokin is "Bulgakov's Maksudov from the 1980s! Conceived and executed that way". In a remark from February 25, 2010, Boris Natanovich developed this thought: "This is both a continuation (in some sense), a dialogue, and a polemic, if you will. In TR the hero lives, completely not understanding what kind of world he has found himself in, what is what here, and, in general, what the logic of this life is. The hero of the Lame Fate (by conception) understands everything, sees everything, is ready for everything—and nevertheless lives his life, has adapted, adjusted, and even finds happiness—in his work (completely useless and seemingly unnecessary to anyone here). This contrast served as the main impetus for our conception".

In a letter dated March 5, 1980, A. Strugatsky suggested returning to the idea of a Soviet Menzura Zoili, but already in prose form; some notes were implemented in the final plot. Between the lines of the preliminary conception was placed the working title Dog Traders, explained in the epigraph with a quote from the same story by Akutagawa: "...those who, trading dog meat, pass it off as lamb, are all doomed." In the work notes, a fallen angel with the score of the trumpets of the Last Judgment also appears. Work was scheduled for November 1980, and in the diary the conception was alternately called Dog Traders and Menzura Zoili, but the co-authors had other matters, and the conception was postponed again. It was only on October 23, 1981, that a detailed plot plan appeared in the work diary under the heading Discussing Menzura Zoili, in which Mikhail Afanasyevich is named "the demon of literature," the exact age of Felix Sorokin—56 years—is indicated, and the fact that he is endowed with the biography of Arkady Strugatsky, as well as references to The Doomed City—the literary novel was to include the text of the protagonist's manuscript (the future Blue Folder). The origin of the surname Sorokin also becomes completely transparent, as the protagonist of The Doomed City also bears a "bird" surname—Voronin. Full-fledged work on Dog Traders began on January 8, 1982. In the draft variant, almost all the plot lines of the future novel were presented, but instead of the Institute on Banya, there was still some "House" — apparently, an analog of the Red Building from The Doomed City, and Bulgakov was named an analog of the "Mentors" from the same novel. From January 10, the co-authors detailed all the events of the novel by internal chronology (at this stage there were six days, not five as in the final text). Work was only on events related to Sorokin; the inserted fragments were designated as "Chapters from DC". The first two days differed little from the final variant; the prototype of Ivan Davydovich Martins was named Alexander Mirer. The third day was to be entirely devoted to the story with the letter as an alien. The rest of the plot also differed little from the final one, only the scene of the comrades' court differed. In the story of the fallen angel, the address of a real drinking establishment was named: "Vernadsky Ave. 117, Shell Bar" (in the novel's text "Granovsky Ave. 19, Pearl"), and after the angel's departure, Felix picked up two "huge" slightly dirty feathers from the floor. The events in the institute and in the restaurant, when Sorokin was drinking with his writer friends, were not yet specified.

=== Manuscript and work progress ===
Writing the draft began on January 11, 1982, and was interrupted on January 16 in the second chapter. Continuation of work followed in Moscow on February 12, when the brother co-authors gathered again until the 18th, at which point work was interrupted in the first scene on Banya. The third stage of preparing the draft lasted from March 24 to 30, and the manuscript reached a volume of 120 typewritten pages. The last stage ran from May 19 to 21, and the draft of the chapters about Felix Sorokin was completed on page 132. In these last days, the writers worked out the connections of the main plot with The Doomed City, outlining the chapters "already written" by Sorokin. Notes for revising the draft are abundantly represented in Arkady Strugatsky's diary for September 1982, interspersed with purely personal notes, memories of the war and Kamchatka, as well as the extremely frank Story of First Love, which was included in the final text. (Note: The story of first love was written by A. N. Strugatsky during work on the script for the film Stalker between July 20 and August 1, 1977. When included in the novel's text, almost all names and surnames were changed, except for the neighbor Anastasia Andreevna, and small additions about Lyusya Neverovskaya were made; here Rita was designated as Felix Sorokin's "last woman".) In the original, the heroine was named Olya, in the diary she is sometimes called Rita, and this same name passes to Sorokin's "last woman." In October, the co-authors met at Boris Natanovich's in Leningrad and actively edited the draft. It was precisely at this stage that they settled on the title Lame Fame and a suitable epigraph from Konishi Raizan — its text with a reference to the collection "Japanese Poetry" was entered directly into the work diary. It is in this part of the diary that it is openly stated that the fictional magazine "Foreign Cripple" is Inostrannaya Literatura. It was also decided to replace the second part of The Doomed City with the first and remove the seditious poem by Alexander Galich "Ave Maria!" from it. Some pessimism of the texts written in this period was also explained by the death of A. N. Strugatsky's father-in-law —Ilya Oshanin— which occurred on September 5, 1982. Revision of the draft continued from October 10 to November 13, documented in A. N. Strugatsky's diary, who was engaged in retyping the fair copy. The entry for November 27 notes that the manuscript has a volume of 214 pages.

Work did not end there, although the finished fair copy the authors began to pass to relatives and good acquaintances for reading. (Note: Among the first readers was Yevgeny Voyskunsky, in whose diary entry from March 22, 1983, the manuscript is rated as "strong, extraordinary prose".) Arkady Strugatsky had ideas for revising individual scenes, some notes on this are undated; on January 3, 1983, Yury Manin suggested "to reduce the scenes in the Club and make the excerpts from DC not literal, but a retelling, à la Yury Trifonov". However, no radical edits were made to the manuscript anymore; only on January 12 was a foreword added that correspondences should not be sought in real life either to the novella's characters or to the various organizations and institutions mentioned there. In the fair copy, the inserts from The Doomed City followed only after the first and fourth chapters. The fair copy has a title page and an author's foreword, but typewritten page numbering is absent, as the manuscript accounts for the unret typed inserted chapters. This typescript has an authorial dating: "Moscow-Leningrad, Feb. 70—November 82". That is, the starting date is set as the authors' appeal to writing The Doomed City. It was precisely this manuscript that served for the subsequent revision of the novel when the content of the Blue Folder changed.

In Comments on the Passed, Boris Strugatsky claimed that "Lame Fame is our second (and last) novel that we consciously wrote 'for the drawer,' understanding that it had no publishing prospects". In reality, the fair copy of Lame Fame was offered by the authors to the editorial offices of various magazines, at least three: Friendship of Peoples, Knowledge Is Power, and Star of the East. The Uzbek magazine "Star of the East" even accepted the manuscript in the summer of 1983 (at that time its editorial office announced a free subscription throughout the USSR territory) and printed an announcement of a new Strugatsky novella scheduled for the next year, but on September 20 the manuscript was returned. In December, Boris Strugatsky was negotiating with the Literary Gazette regarding the publication of some acceptable excerpt (which was successful only a year and a half later). Negotiations on publication continued consistently in 1984, including with the publishing house Moscow Worker. All this time, Arkady Strugatsky pondered how the text could be improved. On October 4, he recorded in his diary that Boris Natanovich suggested "stuffing LD not with a chapter from DC, but with the full power of US, and moreover, the last chapter will be the last chapter from US, and Mikhail Afanasyevich in the library will quote from it—well, at least a paragraph about the city's disintegration. This will be a truly powerful book. The best, as it seems to me now". (Note: Critic V. Dyakonov, on the contrary, claimed that both works suffered from the union. "LD was written by a tired, tormented writer, and US—by a relatively young, active writer who believed that 'everything will grind down.' And the spirit of the time is completely different. This is felt in the text, and the authenticity of the Blue Folder drops sharply. Sorokin could have written such a thing in 1966." Polish literary scholar Wojciech Kajtoch also claimed that "The Doomed City..., perhaps, ...would have been more appropriate there from the point of view of the absurd spirit inherent in that work." However, based on the Strugatskys' artistic tasks and characterological requirements for the protagonist, the same W. Kajtoch recognized the choice of Ugly Swans as justified and the resulting hybrid "can be read not as a mechanical addition, but as a single whole".) Work on the revision began immediately: already on October 5, the co-authors "outlined" the chapters of "Ugly Swans" according to the chapters of Lame Fame; on October 18, Arkady Strugatsky reread "LD for compatibility with US." The technical implementation of merging the two texts began on January 11, 1985, when Boris Strugatsky arrived in Moscow. The next day, the co-authors unanimously recognized Lame Fame as a novel; its volume amounted to about 19 author's sheets. The most serious edits were related to the fact that in the early edition Sorokin had written only the first part of his novel, while in the final edition, only the last chapter is missing from his manuscript. The only complete typescript of the final edition includes 423 pages; it is free of blots and traces of edits.

=== Publication and editions ===
In January 1985, an opportunity arose to submit Lame Fame to the editorial office of the magazine Neva; on January 31, Arkady Strugatsky recorded in his diary that these were only the chapters with Felix Sorokin. However, having gained negative experience in previous years, the manuscript was also offered in parallel to the editorial office of Novy Mir and the editorial office of the magazine Tallinn (the latter quickly replied that the novella's volume was too much for the magazine). In July 1985, the Neva editorial preferred the early edition with references to The Doomed City, but without these inserted chapters and with certain edits, primarily due to the beginning anti-alcohol campaign. The contract was signed on August 7, 1985. Although Boris Strugatsky claimed that the Blue Folder was rejected for censorship reasons, as he could not remain silent before the chief editor about the fate of Ugly Swan, the reasons may have been purely literary. In the early 1990s, the head of the prose department of the Neva magazine, Samuil Lurie, in an interview with Roman Arbitman, claimed that the editorial board considered Ugly Swans a separate finished work that should be published as is.

The manuscript submission deadline, according to the contract, ended on December 1, 1985. The co-authors' meeting took place on November 15 and 16 in Moscow; based on the results, Arkady Strugatsky recorded in his diary: "Only three texts of inserts and numerous excisions and corrections on alcohol mentions." Some edits had to be made urgently when the manuscript went to typesetting. On March 26, 1986, Arkady Natanovich performed a reading of selected fragments at the Neva evening in the Central House of Writers. On April 23, a small excerpt "Fallen Angel" was printed in the Literary Gazette. Censorship was successfully passed in July 1986, and Lame Fame was published in the August and September issues of the Neva magazine. For the next three years, this was the only variant of the text available to the wide reader. The book edition followed in 1989: in the author's collection "Waves Quench the Wind" of the publishing house Soviet Writer (together with the eponymous novella and Snail on the Slope) and as a separate book in the "Alpha-Science Fiction" series of the cooperative publishing house Text. In 1990, the novel was published twice, and thereafter invariably included in all collected works of the Strugatskys.

The magazine and book variants of Lame Fame differed greatly from each other. Thus, in the authors' foreword, the magazine variant was called a novella by them, in the book editions—a novel. There was a large number of changes in proper names—for example, when quoting the story Narcissus, the name of the "full-fledged idiot who became impotent at sixteen" varied (in the magazine variant—Kart es-Shanua, in some editions—Kart se-Shanua, in others—Kartshe-Shanua). From the magazine variant, everything that in Soviet publishing practice could be considered "pornography" or "obscenity" was consistently removed. When quoting the same "Narcissus", the name of the shepherd Onan was replaced with "Onon," and the word "onanism" with "handjob"; the definition of the story as "pornographic" was also removed. Although the episode about the intimacy of 15-year-old schoolboy Sorokin and 19-year-old student Katya was passed by the editorial board, a number of naturalistic details important for understanding the prehistory of their relationship were removed. One morning Sorokin recalls that he used to dream more about "women." "Women" was replaced with "amours and Venuses." The diary entry was removed: "Disgusting, like a cigarette butt in a urinal," and so on. Reduced lexicon was consistently removed, such as "ass," the word "bitch" and similar. Especially many changes were made to the magazine text due to the consistent removal of everything related to alcohol consumption. At the very beginning of the narrative, Felix Sorokin looked at the snow-swept Moscow, drank wine and pondered; in the magazine variant, he was forced to sip warmed mineral water. Further in the text, in the phrase "I took the glass and took a good swig," the word "good" was replaced with "therapeutic-dietary." Sorokin's trip to the confectionery store was completely reworked, as he actually took a bottle each of wine and cognac, but in the magazine variant, Sorokin was forced to take candies and the delicacy "oil union" ("consists of a homogeneous white candy mass of two or more layers in rectangular form, decorated with prunes, raisins, and candied fruits"). The daughter's sarcastic question was removed: "Expanding the vessels again?", and after the conversation with Katya, Sorokin, in joy, did not "pour himself a finger of cognac and slightly recover," but "poured the last remnants of Brazilian coffee into the cup, which he kept for particularly solemn occasions". Researchers of the Strugatskys' archive listed a significantly greater number of similar replacements. Political allusions were also consistently removed. Even hints of Jewishness were eliminated: the clarification about the writer Zhora Naumov, "aka Girsh Naumovich," was removed, and "some Jew from the Academy of Sciences" was replaced with "some beetle from the Academy of Sciences." Accordingly, Sorokin calls this statement not antisemitic, but an "anti-scientific" outburst. The magazine Sovetish Heymland was replaced with Reliable Translator. In the magazine edition, the source of the epigraph for the contents of the Blue Folder was not indicated: Revelation of John the Divine (Apocalypse). The series Adjutant of His Excellency was simply called a "series" without a title.

The only book edition of the magazine text of Lame Fame was included in the collection of stories, novellas, and memoirs Manuscripts Do Not Burn, timed to the 50th anniversary of the Neva magazine (2005). The "cooperative" variant was reproduced in 1992 in a two-volume selected works of the Strugatskys with numerous typos; Lame Fame was called a novella in the colophon, although in the author's foreword it remained a novel. The "Alpha-Science Fiction" variant was also used in the ninth volume of the Strugatskys' collected works of the Text publishing house, released in 1993, and for the second book of volume 21 of the Library of Science Fiction (1996). In the "Worlds of the Strugatsky Brothers" series (1998), Ugly Swans and Lame Fame were printed separately and in different volumes, with Lame Fame called a novel and the odd chapter numbering retained. When publishing Lame Fame in the ten-volume set of EKSMO in 2006, the text was called "chapters from the novel," which were devoid of numbering. After the release in 2001 of the "black collected works" of the Stalker publishing house, the novel was almost always printed precisely in this edition—with the text of Ugly Swans and with the addition of some fragments from the fair copy typescript. In the 33-volume complete collected works of the Strugatskys, the original variant with inserted chapters from The Doomed City was placed in volume 25, (Note: In this variant, the chapters about Felix Sorokin had no headings and were designated by Arabic numerals. After chapter 1 followed the two initial chapters of the first part of The Doomed City, designated "Chapter One" and so on. After chapter 4 (with the story of the fallen angel) were placed chapters three and four of The Doomed City', In chapter 5, Mikhail Afanasyevich reads the final paragraph of part six and the entire novel The Doomed City.) and the final edition with the text of Ugly Swans and an extensive commentary — in volume 27.

In 2020, an English translation of Lame Fame (with the inserted text of Ugly Swans) was published in Chicago, done by Maya Vinokour. The edition received predominantly positive or neutral reader reviews.

== Literary features ==
=== Reality and its artistic refraction ===
Of all the works by the Strugatsky brothers, Lame Fate had the greatest autobiographical subtext. This manifested itself at the earliest stage of developing the image of F. Sorokin, who was endowed with many details of Arkady Strugatsky's life path and personality, refracted in a corresponding manner for artistic purposes. To create a "full-blooded artistic image", many entities and institutions were accordingly reworked. For example, Felix Sorokin inherited from Arkady Strugatsky his extraordinary physical strength. In the episode where it is said that people often reluctantly sit next to Sorokin in public transport, Arkady Strugatsky's observation of himself was manifested (Boris Strugatsky later agreed with him); by chance, this coincided with the description of the protagonist of Clifford D. Simak's novel Ring Around the Sun. The mention of Dashiell Hammett's detective novel Bloody Harvest was explained by the fact that in 1971 Arkady Strugatsky was nurturing plans to translate this novel. When F. Sorokin, recalling how he published Modern Fairy Tales (this work had no prototype), quoted a certain critic that "his machines overshadow people", it referred to the discussion on March 14, 1960, at which Yevgeny Brandis stated:

Popularizing scientific ideas is not an end in itself, but one of the elements of science fiction. But if we take, for example, the stories of A. and B. Strugatsky —these are undoubtedly gifted, erudite authors— it is easy to notice that what excites them most are not people, but scientific hypotheses, self-developing mechanisms. The pathos of naked technology dehumanizes literature.

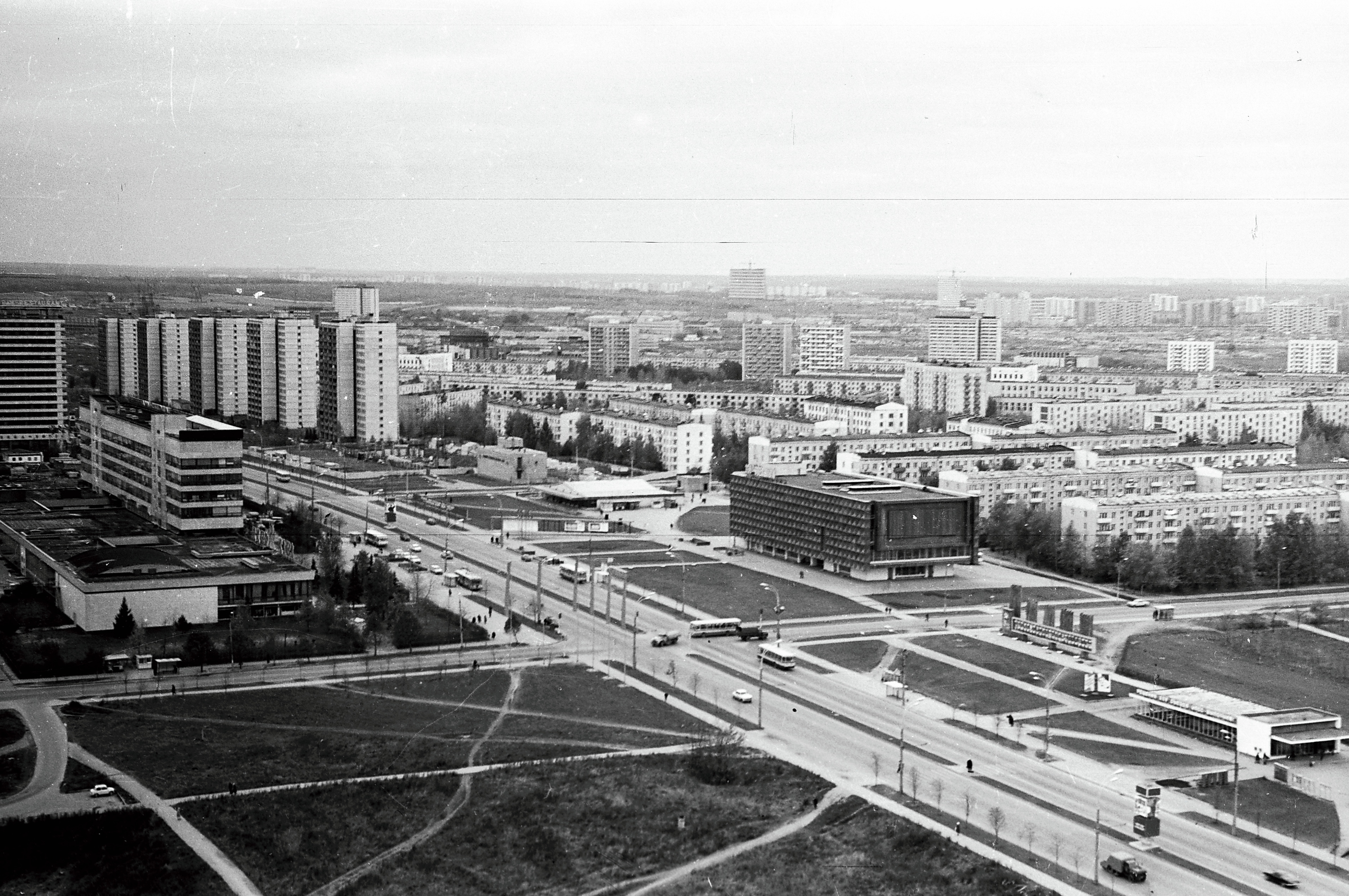
The intersection of Udaltseva Street and Vernadsky Avenue in Moscow in autumn 1977. The apartment of the novel's Felix Sorokin and his prototype Arkady Strugatsky was located near these places.

The attacks by Mefodiy Kirillovich (the Pus-Filled Pimple) on Garik Aganyan are a reflection of the discussion on science fiction on March 27, 1963, with attacks by Alexander Kazantsev on Genrikh Altov. However, in his commentary, B. Strugatsky insisted that Kazantsev was not mentioned directly in the text of Lame Fate. The overwhelming majority of the prototypes of the novel's characters are little-known second-tier writers, whose names Boris Natanovich considered pointless to disclose. All descriptions of the life of the Writers' Club, including the dishes served there, derive not from the actual existing Central House of Writers, but exclusively from the "Griboyedov" described in Mikhail Bulgakov's The Master and Margarita. (Note: The episodes with the vigilant old woman-gatekeeper who refuses to let Sorokin into the Club's restaurant and when Sorokin, entering the Institute on Banny, introduces himself by the name "Yesenin" also derive from Bulgakov's novel.) There were also other echoes with the co-authors' own work and life circumstances. Recalling his past, Felix Sorokin reports that he was seconded to the Military Institute of Translators; in 1943, Arkady Strugatsky was seconded from the Berdichev Infantry School (then located in Aktubinsk) to the Military Institute of Foreign Languages of the Red Army in Stavropol-on-Volga. Arkady Strugatsky's memories of the first fascist he killed (near Kingisepp) were written for the "Autobiography for the American anthology World Authors: 1975–1980" and mentioned in correspondence and diary entries from September 4 and 5, 1982. (Note: The Strugatskys' biographer Ant Skalandis as early as 2008 doubted "whether this happened to him personally at all".) Sorokin's reasoning about the libraries he collected and lost was borrowed with minor changes from the Strugatskys' unfinished novella The Days of the Kraken, work on which was interrupted as early as 1963. The memories of the burning in Kansk in 1949 of a confiscated library of some dignitary of Manchukuo corresponded to Arkady Natanovich's real biography. The mention of Poronaysk, in whose house of culture F. Sorokin gave away his third library, is an artistic inversion, since A. Strugatsky served in Petropavlovsk-Kamchatsky. Ironically reworked quotes from Agni Yoga and the Upanishads derive from full quotations in the novellas Noon: 22nd Century and Monday Begins on Saturday. The title "Sēnen jidai-no saku" (青年時代の作) — "Works of Youthful Years" was indeed assigned to the folder with Arkady Strugatsky's earliest manuscripts. Sometimes both real and fictional titles were mentioned: in Khabarovsk, the newspaper of the Far Eastern Military District Suvorovsky Natisk was indeed published, while the "Foreign Invalid" mentioned in Moscow is the journal Foreign Literature, and "Quarterly Overseer" seemed merely a funny combination of words and had no prototype. From the contents of the folder of youthful creations, the text quotes the stories Incident on Guard Duty and Narcissus. Kostya Kudinov's "fiery speech" as a student at the Literary Institute in 1949 may have been a reference to Yuri Trifonov's novel The Students. Felix Sorokin's house is house No. 119 on Vernadsky Avenue next to the Troparyovo Church, that is, the house in which A. N. Strugatsky received an apartment (No. 273 on the sixteenth floor) in 1971. Nearby was the "Rakushka" bar, transformed into the "Pearl", where Felix Sorokin met the fallen angel. The screenplay Five Spoons of Elixir, later used for the film Temptation B. (1990), turned out to be "too heavy" for the novel, "overpowered" the entire action, so only episodes were included in the novel.

=== Characters. Chronotope ===
==== Principles of Communication ====
I. V. Nerovova, in her dissertation, drew attention to the fact that the Strugatskys' work is characterized by an abundance of characters, who can be classified as main heroes, secondary and episodic heroes, as well as "off-stage" (a term introduced by analogy with drama), that is, those existing only in the remarks of other characters. With the exception of Felix Sorokin, throughout Lame Fate the characters participate in one, rarely in two episodes, and there are more than twenty of them in total. Only once do Sorokin's daughter Katka, the writer Valya Demchenko, and the fallen angel appear. Kostya Kudinov and Mikhail Afanasyevich appear twice. As is usual in the Strugatskys' work, the hero is always immersed in society, has a wide circle of acquaintances, and actively interacts with those around him. Felix Sorokin constantly communicates, both in person and by correspondence and by telephone, with his daughter, with Fyodor Mikheich, a member of the Writers' Union board, with his neighbors in the house—the composer Goga Chachua and the poet Kostya Kudinov—with the postwoman, saleswomen, waitresses, passersby. This creates an effect of "fullness" of the artistic world. There are the most "off-stage" characters in the novel: in the first chapter, these are Felix's father, Felix's ex-wife Clara, janitors, fellow students Rafka Rezanov and Vasya Kuznetsov, friend Slava Krutoyarsky, certain Kap Kapyich and Nos Nosyich. The main function of such characters is to create an effect of the world's autonomy outside the narrated plots, to expand the spatial-temporal boundaries of the world. Behind each character trails some personal history of their own, outlined but not revealed by the authors. As in other Strugatsky works of the 1980s, Lame Fate contains two parallel plots: the first is connected with the actual event series, the action; the second reflects the dynamics of the hero's inner life, his reflections on the present and the past. Felix Sorokin finds himself at the epicenter of certain events, the meaning of which mostly eludes him. He directly calls what is happening to him "sorceries" and does not shy away from actions (although he himself characterizes these sorceries as "stupid ones, of such a nature that they evoke no feelings in anyone, not even in the joker himself, except embarrassment and shame with toes curling in boots"), even if it completely contradicts his plans. He travels across half of Moscow for the mysterious mafussalin for the poet Kudinov, who is completely not close to him, and goes to Mikhail Afanasyevich on Banny, although he does not share at all the ideas of the Writers' Union secretariat about helping scientists. Unconsciously by chance, he buys from the "fallen angel" the score of the Trumpets of the Last Judgment and gives it for "checking" to his friend-composer Goga Chachua, although he considers the "angel" a fraud. That is, the writer's actions are controlled by an external force, some kind of inspiration. (Note: According to the observation of E. S. Kukushkina, the novel's title should be understood on one of the levels quite literally, since Felix Sorokin suffers from intermittent lameness.)

==== Protagonist and His World ====
Felix Sorokin, like his character Viktor Banev, perceives life through the prism of his calling — writing, seeing plots and images in everything around him. The plots themselves do not interest him; he tries to correlate his life circumstances with the laws of literature, as he understands them (in the episode with the mafussalin): "I tried to recall at least one literary work where the hero, finding himself in my or a similar situation, would allow himself to express unwillingness to go in any way clearly, without any circumlocutions. The reader would never forgive him for that." In this respect, Sorokin and Banev are mirror opposites, since Viktor is active, constantly intervenes in events, which brings him pleasure; Felix acts by inertia, against his will, mainly engaged in reflections. The objective world into which Sorokin is immersed is the completely everyday Soviet life of 1982. For the chronotope of Lame Fate, the hero's immersion in the flow of history is characteristic; all letters, diary notes, drafts, and memories are precisely dated and correlated with past events. Katya's story, Felix's first love, ends in the "cursed summer of forty-one," and the beginning of the action is marked by a letter from Japan dated December 25, 1981, and a mention that it is mid-January on the calendar. The topography of real Moscow is scrupulously observed: Sorokin lives in Arkady Natanovich Strugatsky's real apartment and goes to have breakfast and drink beer in a real establishment, where he stumbles upon the fallen angel. It is precisely things that allow distinguishing in the reality of Lame Fate everyday life and the writer's calling. Sorokin finds pleasure in simple things: tasty food, light in the whole house, good books, warmth when there is a blizzard and cold outside. He is fully included in the flow of being: he washes dishes, fights with a malfunctioning toilet tank, has lunch with potatoes and canned stewed meat, sorts books on the shelves, goes down to the confectionery for cognac and wine, and so on. Sorokin is given to experience the importance and value of every minute, "not missing a single detail capable of bringing a feeling of causeless happiness." At the same time, Felix Alexandrovich himself clearly understands that his real life is "scrawled scraps of paper, some kind of blueprints on which I depicted who stands where and where they look, scraps of phrases, applications for screenplays, drafts of letters to authorities, detailed plans for works that will never be created." The most important marker of the writer's being is the texts created by Sorokin, a significant part of which are listed in the first chapter. The milestones of Sorokin's inner life turn out to be his drafts and sketches of texts, just as libraries mark his life path. The Great Patriotic War deprived the young Felix of his first library: after the bombing of Leningrad, it miraculously survived as a single book with a dedicatory inscription from the author to his father. The young Sorokin collected his second library in Kansk, where he taught at officers' courses, but since "my departure from Kansk was swift and managed from above—decisively and inexorably," the library never found him. Giving away the third library to the house of culture means a sharp breakdown of the somehow established life: "After all, I was nobody then, knew absolutely nothing, was not trained for civilian life," just as the fourth—the divorce from his wife ("And the Lord be with both of them"). The last, fifth library constitutes his fate and at the same time serves as a reason for the appearance of many "off-stage" characters. Unlike these latter, Felix describes books in much more detail than his late father or ex-wife. The objective world directly refers to the category of time, since through things and books Sorokin recalls the past and comprehends the present. Literary everyday life in Lame Fate serves as a transitional zone between Soviet existence and creative heights. This literary everyday life also doubles: on the one hand, it allows Sorokin to earn money and communicate in the restaurant with like-minded friends, communicate with readers; on the other—it is the burdensome serving of duties in various commissions, meetings, and other meaningless "talkathons". (Note: The hack writer Petenka Skorobogatov, nicknamed Oylo Soyuznoye, managed during one such meeting at the Institute of Linguistic Research, in the middle of a monotonous phrase about "strengthening and raising the labor discipline of all and everyone, the moral and ethical level of each and all, spiritual purity, personal honesty" to insert: "And animal husbandry!" This phrase made it into the novel from a real literary conference held during the stagnation years.) It is not surprising that Sorokin loves to be alone, for the people populating the everyday sphere of his life cause him an infinite feeling of guilt: he abandoned his wife, his daughter inherited his absurd fate, even the grandchildren (only briefly mentioned) no longer bring the former joy. In Felix's unsuccessful personal life, there is his only love Katya, killed in the bombing in 1941, and "his last woman" Rita. In communication with them, there was and is no feeling of guilt; the relationships bring him joy, although time has not smoothed the bitterness of losing Katya at all, and Sorokin forbids himself to remember her. That pre-war 15-year-old schoolboy differed so much from the 56-year-old writer that the inserted story-memory is told in the third person.

==== Protagonist and the Writers' World ====
The writer's and everyday spheres of Felix Sorokin's life in the world of Lame Fate are projected onto the external character sphere and social roles. The "writers' area" is represented by his communication with fellow writers and Writers' Union employees and, in turn, is divided into creative and literary-everyday. The writers in Sorokin's circle are divided through his subjective perception into true creators capable of producing highly valuable literary texts regardless of material conditions and authoritative prohibitions: Valya Demchenko, Lonya Shibzd, Zhora Naumov. These people are close to him, and he is absolutely sure that if he read his Blue Folder to any of them, he would be instantly understood. The group of craftsman-hacks is represented by Kostya Kudinov and Petenka Skorobogatov nicknamed "Oylo Soyuznoye." They possess neither talent nor the ability to create, but they are very sensitive to the material dimension of writerly success. (Note: Within this group, a mirror pair stands out: the informer Gnoiny Pryshch, who has donned the mask of a writer, and his double O. Oreshin, whose habits an ordinary person cannot understand at all.) The older members of the Writers' Union are mostly perceived by Sorokin as absolutely talentless, unscrupulous, concerned only with accumulating material: "with hands elbow-deep in blood, with memory festering with unimaginable details, with conscience strangled or even crushed to death—the heirs of derelict apartments, derelict manuscripts, derelict posts." At the same time, Sorokin himself organically belongs to both groups: on the one hand, he is an officially recognized "writer of military-patriotic themes" who doubts his right to speak about the war. His own work causes him disgust (quoting Ryūnosuke Akutagawa, he calls himself a "dog meat peddler"), but he continues to write, receive royalties, and spend evenings in the Writers' Union restaurant in the company of friends and acquaintances. Work is not a reflection and embodiment of his true talent, for that lies in the realm of creative fantasy and science fiction, barely tolerated by official instances. Sorokin himself divides his two hypostases when he strives to end the day "in a special way—alone with himself, but not with the one known from commissions, seminars, editorial offices, and the club restaurant, but with the one unknown anywhere". It is precisely in the everyday sphere that the characters representing the mystical-fantastic background in the novel are rooted. The overtly fantastic stories are those with the mafussalin, the fallen angel, and the score of the Trumpets of the Last Judgment; with the man in the checkered overcoat-turncoat; with the strange letter and calls from people mistaking Sorokin for the hero of his book, as well as the plot line connected with the "Testometer" and Mikhail Afanasyevich. The situations connected with them allow both realistic and fantastic interpretations. Sorokin perceives the mafussalin and the terrible Martinsen through the prism of a visit to a secret institute about which he is not supposed to know at all. However, after meeting the checkered spy (Note: As noted by literary scholars S. Piskunova and V. Piskunov, the overcoat that can be worn inside out simultaneously hints at both the jester and the devil.) he becomes convinced that he has found himself in his own plot "with this damned elixir, which I myself invented and brought down on my head." That is, the relationship between text and reality becomes reversed: first he invented and wrote it, and then it all happened. (Note: The same story repeats with the Writer's Talent Measurer: "…Everything you just told me is the plot of a comedy that the late Anatoly Yefimovich wanted to write… — Ah, yes, — he said, as if remembering. — Only he, you know, didn't just want to write it. He wrote that comedy. He even portrayed himself there—under another name, of course. And in March of fifty-two, it all happened in Kukushkino… Something cut me in that last phrase, but I had already latched onto another…") The Polish literary scholar Wojciech Kałtoch argued that by endowing Sorokin with traits of Arkady Strugatsky, the writers forced their readers to suspect the hero of conformism, to which the genre in which Felix succeeded hinted: "mediocre battle fiction" in the 1980s was associated with the novellas of Yulian Semyonov or Alexander Chakovsky. Sorokin's "heretical" interest in science fiction is an inversion of the Strugatskys themselves, since "what was literary everyday life for them is for Sorokin an occasionally realized dream". Lame Fate is, first of all, a realistic picture of the life of Soviet writers of the eighties and at the same time a sociological study of the fate of a writer in the conditions of a totalitarian society. However, the lifestyle of Soviet writers is quite comfortable for each of the creators, since it is payment for the ideological purity of the works. "It is also characteristic that the whole company drinks until losing consciousness." In the critic's opinion, the Strugatskys tried to tell the truth about the time "by the method of small facts and a narrow lens".

=== Echoes of The Lame Fate and The Ugly Swans ===
Boris Strugatsky categorically asserted that The Ugly Swans ideally suited as material for the Blue Folder of the hero of The Lame Fate: the novella could well have been written by Felix Sorokin, and this text intersected with everything that was happening. The structure of the "novel within a novel" allows for establishing functional pairs in the system of characters of the work. The comparison of parallels between the main heroes was carried out in 1993 by Wojciech Kajtoch: Banev is twenty years younger than Sorokin, therefore Felix's daughter is thirty years old, while Victor's daughter Irma is twelve years old. Due to his age, Victor is physically indomitable, works spontaneously, leads a tumultuous romance. Sorokin is tired of life and seriously ill, capable of spending no more than two or three hours at the writing desk, and his romance with Rita he himself perceives as "the last love of an elderly man". (Note: As noted by V. V. Piskunova, the name Rita also alludes to Bulgakov's novel (shortening of the name Margarita).) Banev is known to everyone in his country, and even his "awakening to activity" — this is participation in the struggle of the special services; "few know about Sorokin, and he can participate, at most, in idiotic disputes about plagiarism". After the unification of the texts of The Lame Fate and The Ugly Swans, it turned out that Victor Banev is a transformed and displaced reflection of Felix Sorokin, the desired projection of his "straightened" fate. Both heroes are writers, moreover both do not like to write, since they do not find in this profession the expression of cherished convictions and aspirations. Both are somehow hindered by the political regime: both in the USSR and in the country of the lord president, "national self-consciousness" reigns and "jingling" is persecuted, and Moscow writers tell horror stories that at the Banya scientists are "training" a robot-editor that will find "subtext" in any manuscript, and they are already preparing for the release of typewriters with electronic censorship limiters. And Sorokin, and Banev end up in the epicenter of strange events, but only to Victor is it fated to receive an explanation of what is happening. In the worlds of The Lame Fate and The Ugly Swans there exist other pairs of characters as well. The daughters of the main heroes—Irma and Katka—are comparable in exactly the same way as their fathers. Both heroes were previously married and now are in a love connection with beautiful decisive women—Rita and Diana. However, Diana is one of the main acting characters of "The Ugly Swans," whereas the repeatedly mentioned Rita so remained an off-stage character. The artist Rem Quadriga can be compared with Lyonya Shybzd and Oyl Soyuzny: these are jester characters, simultaneously comic and intrusive. In the opinion of I. Neronova, in principle it is admissible to compare chief physician Yul Golem and the operator of Ispital Mikhail Afanasyevich — for both fulfill the function of a prophet, possess greater knowledge than the main heroes, suggest to Felix and Victor possible actions and explanations. Mikhail Afanasyevich is paired with the former famous philosopher, and now "wet one" Zurzmansor, who reflects on the writer's purpose. Both are cruel: to Mikhail Afanasyevich the man Sorokin is completely uninteresting, to him the creative self-fulfillment of the writer is important—completion of the Blue Folder. Zurzmansor converses with Banev about "commissioned creativity" and says almost the same thing: "The lord president imagines that he bought the painter R. Quadriga. This is a mistake. He bought the hack R. Quadriga, while the painter slipped through his fingers and died. And we do not want the writer Banev to slip through someone's fingers, even ours, and die. We need artists, not propagandists." However, the prophet is capable of suggesting a solution to the questions tormenting the heroes, and when Mikhail Afanasyevich quotes the last chapter of the Blue Folder that has not yet been written, Sorokin becomes "outrageously, indecently, and ineptly happy". According to I. Neronova, both parts of The Lame Fate — the external (Sorokinian) and the internal (Banevian)—construct and reconstruct the problematic field of writing and the writer's destiny under conditions of unfreedom. The authors attempted to reveal all aspects of the writer's personality from the everyday to the sacred:

The novel is a representation of the writer's drama in two "mirrors": socio-historical, cultural as "real" and artistically modeled, metaphysical. By uniting, the two works, reflecting each other, create an artistic "stereography" of large literary scale instead of local "monographs" of publicistic (The Lame Fate) or utopian (The Ugly Swans) character.

=== Intertextuality ===
A peculiarity of The Lame Fate in the work of Arkady and Boris Strugatsky, according to the observation of I. Neronova, is the permeation of the entire narrative with Japanese texts, which was also determined by the genesis of the novel. Quotations and reminiscences to the story by Akutagawa The Menzura of Zoilus are given a special place. Felix Sorokin, discussing professional issues with fellow writers, quotes: "Since they invented this thing, all these writers and artists who sell dog meat and call it mutton—all of them are now done for!" The reminiscence ("Meat! <…> But not dog meat") is included in the hero's final phrase, summing up the entire work. Actually, the device Menzura Zoili serves as an important topic for the conversation between Felix Alexandrovich and Mikhail Afanasyevich, which switches the narrative to the "Bulgakovian" line. The reference to the story also appears when referring to insincere craftsman writers, like Oyl Soyuzny. Felix Sorokin himself, being a military Japanese translator, often uses the Japanese language, which enhances the autobiographical element in the novel. The epigraph to the novel—"a painfully sad and precise haiku of the ancient Japanese poet Raizan about the autumn of our life"—according to the idea of B. N. Strugatsky, emphasized the main emotional tone of the novel — "a confession in old age". The Bulgakov theme (in the terminology of V. Miloslavskaya, the "Bulgakov myth") is also an important intertextual line and at the same time an organizing element of the text's structure. The mention of Bulgakov and his Theatrical Novel appears almost at the very beginning, when Sorokin chooses a book for the evening: "There is nothing better in the world than the 'Theatrical Novel,' beat me if you want, or cut me… And I took from the shelf a volume of Bulgakov and caressed it with my fingers, and stroked the smooth binding with my palm, and for the umpteenth time thought that it is impossible, sinful to treat a book like a living person". The central part of the Bulgakov line, unlike the "Japanese" one, consists not of quotations, but of the integral image of Mikhail Afanasyevich, in whom Sorokin seems to see Bulgakov himself: "And I looked at him, and was amazed by the similarity to the portrait in the brown volume, and was amazed that for three months none of our chatterboxes recognized him, and I myself managed not to recognize him at first sight there, at the Banya". However, Mikhail Afanasyevich himself categorically denies not only the identification, but also the famous statement from the Master and Margarita: "The dead die forever, Felix Alexandrovich. This is as true as the fact that manuscripts burn to ashes. No matter how much he asserts the opposite". The juggling of quotations emphasizes the plot twist: Sorokin makes Mikhail Afanasyevich understand that he considers him to be Bulgakov. Mikhail Afanasyevich, by refuting the famous quote, thereby refutes that he is Bulgakov. But by using the allusion to Master and Margarita, he refutes himself, leaving the question open. The Strugatsky's Mikhail Afanasyevich is in some ways akin to Woland, and he has a demonic principle; he categorically rejects sympathy and promises Sorokin neither light nor peace. Literary scholar G. L. Ivanyuta considered The Lame Fate as a work in which the process of text generation itself is objectified: "a novel about a writer who writes a novel about a writer, among whose heroes there is, if not a writer, then at least some journalist." Thus, Sorokin is included in two symmetrical systems of relations, isomorphic to each other: at the level of composition, this is a "novel within a novel," and at the level of content, the writer's conflict with the hypothetical force determining his fate and at the same time his demiurgic activity in the world of the secretly created novel, the Blue Folder. In the apparent chaos of numerous plot lines, weakly connected to each other and not receiving resolution, one can find an order of a special kind. Each of the situations that Sorokin encounters and tries to comprehend has a correlate in the system of auxiliary texts that document the writer's creative laboratory (plans, sketches, etc.). The "life of the text" acts in relation to the "text of life" as a metatext, but also as a determining principle. Similarly, the texts of other characters act: one such text is the comedy of the late Anatoly Efimovich, describing the "Ispital," which thirty years later is managed by Mikhail Afanasyevich. The title …Why do you keep blowing the trumpet, young man? from the Gazelle of Osip Mandelstam refers to his own Egyptian Stamp with motifs of the archangel's trumpet, who meets Sorokin and offers him a score. At the same time, all the listed plots are included in a context of reduced directionality: the story of the fallen angel turns out to be invented for the purpose of banal begging, and the score of the trumpets of the Last Judgment is displaced from the heroes' world by a "genuinely" tragic event—the loss of Spartak; the man in the checkered suit turns out to be crazy (and they push him into the "Ambulance" car); the "vurdalak" Martinsen uses the products of the secret institute for personal purposes; anonymous letters and calls are connected with the erroneous identification of Sorokin with the heroes of his book, and so on. The range of intertextual references in The Lame Fate is extremely wide: from the Bible to popular jokes and numerous allusions to Mikhail Saltykov-Shchedrin. The latter are placed exclusively in an ironic context and serve to characterize Soviet reality. Quotes from Saltykov-Shchedrin are also present in Sorokin's work diary. The works of Sorokin the battler the hero himself compares to the work of K. Simonov, V. Bykov, V. Kondratiev, thus introducing them into the existing literary tradition. Through the depiction of war in Soviet literature, the reader can form an idea of what and how Felix Sorokin writes. All this allowed literary scholars N. V. Kovtun, G. L. Ivanyuta, and V. V. Miloslavskaya to consider The Lame Fate as an early postmodernist novel. The chaotic pile-up of plots polemicized with the normative poetics of socialist realism, which codified causal connections in the text.

=== "Novel within a Novel", pretext and posttexts of The Lame Fate ===
Professor V. P. Izotov (Oryol State University) specifically examined the question of the use of the "novel within a novel" technique in the work of the Strugatskys. Works of this type, including parallel narratives about two heroes, include Snail on the Slope and Overburdened with Evil. The peculiarity of precisely The Lame Fate is that the plot lines constituting the novel exist independently of each other, since the content of the Blue Folder changed as the creative intention changed. The texts are thus perceived by readers as mutually penetrating each other, and their heroes differ in the same way as the authors—the Strugatskys in the 1960s differed from these same authors of the 1980s, that is, precisely by the difference of these eras.

The researcher identified multi-level parallels between The Lame Fate and the novel by V. Shefner The Debtor's Hut, also constructed on the principle of a novel within a novel. Shefner's hero Pavel Belobrysiv becomes the object of an alien experiment, and he is given access to an elixir that provides the physical possibility of living a million years (without guaranteeing preservation from infections, catastrophes, and injuries, including psychological ones). However, if in the Strugatskys the narrative lays down a dramatic collision, then Shefner treated the plot ironically: the elixir went to the animals. Both works feature satirical descriptions of the semi-hack writer environment. As noted by Boris Mezhuyev, around 1962–1965 Arkady and Boris Strugatsky actively rethought the foundations of the communist utopia and radically changed their ideas about the future. The most important concepts became the irreversible split of humanity into the general mass and the elite, with the latter possessing abilities and skills that in modern mythology are available only to magicians and wizards. The overwhelming majority of ordinary people have no place and will not have any place in the bright future in principle. In the drafts of The Ugly Swans, the connection of the image of the mysterious "wet ones" with the priestesses of parthenogenesis from Snail on the Slope is clearly traceable. In one of the sketches, it is directly stated that the wet ones had access to "the highest synthesis, incomprehensible to man: power over dead matter". They are subject to the element of water, and they are capable of causing rain in all places where they found themselves. However, later the Strugatskys lost faith in the creative possibilities of super-beings and their ability to perform the function of "guards" transforming the world. The novel (more precisely, both novellas that compose it) gave rise to at least two posttexts in Russian literature. In 1996, Ant Skalandis wrote the novella The Second Attempt for the anthology The Disciples' Time, in which the situation of The Ugly Swans is turned mirror-like (instead of rain—heat; instead of child prodigies—young war veterans). Earlier, in 1986, V. Nikolaev's novella Anchor of Salvation was published, which is about a device that measures the genius of literary works, with the emphasis placed precisely on the description of the working machine. The basis of the plot is a technical malfunction when the machine issued the most ordinary work as genius, and it describes what this led to. The coincidence is obvious, although The Lame Fate was published somewhat later than V. Nikolaev's novella. Some plots, a whole kaleidoscope of which is scattered throughout The Lame Fate, can be defined as autoparatext, that is, the author's reflection on their own works. The plot of the split of humanity and its consequences is also present: in one of Sorokin's plots and in the script Five Spoons of Elixir, immortality is available to only five people. In addition to Akutagawa's Menzura Zoili (a clearly designated pretext), in Russian there exists a story by Roald Dahl Revenge is sweet, translated and published in 1987. At the basis of its plot is the fate of a super-computer that is capable of writing stories and novels at a quite acceptable literary level after entering certain linguistic and literary parameters. Writing a novel took about fifteen minutes. This story is undoubtedly parallel to The Lame Fate.

=== Mysticism and narrative strategy ===
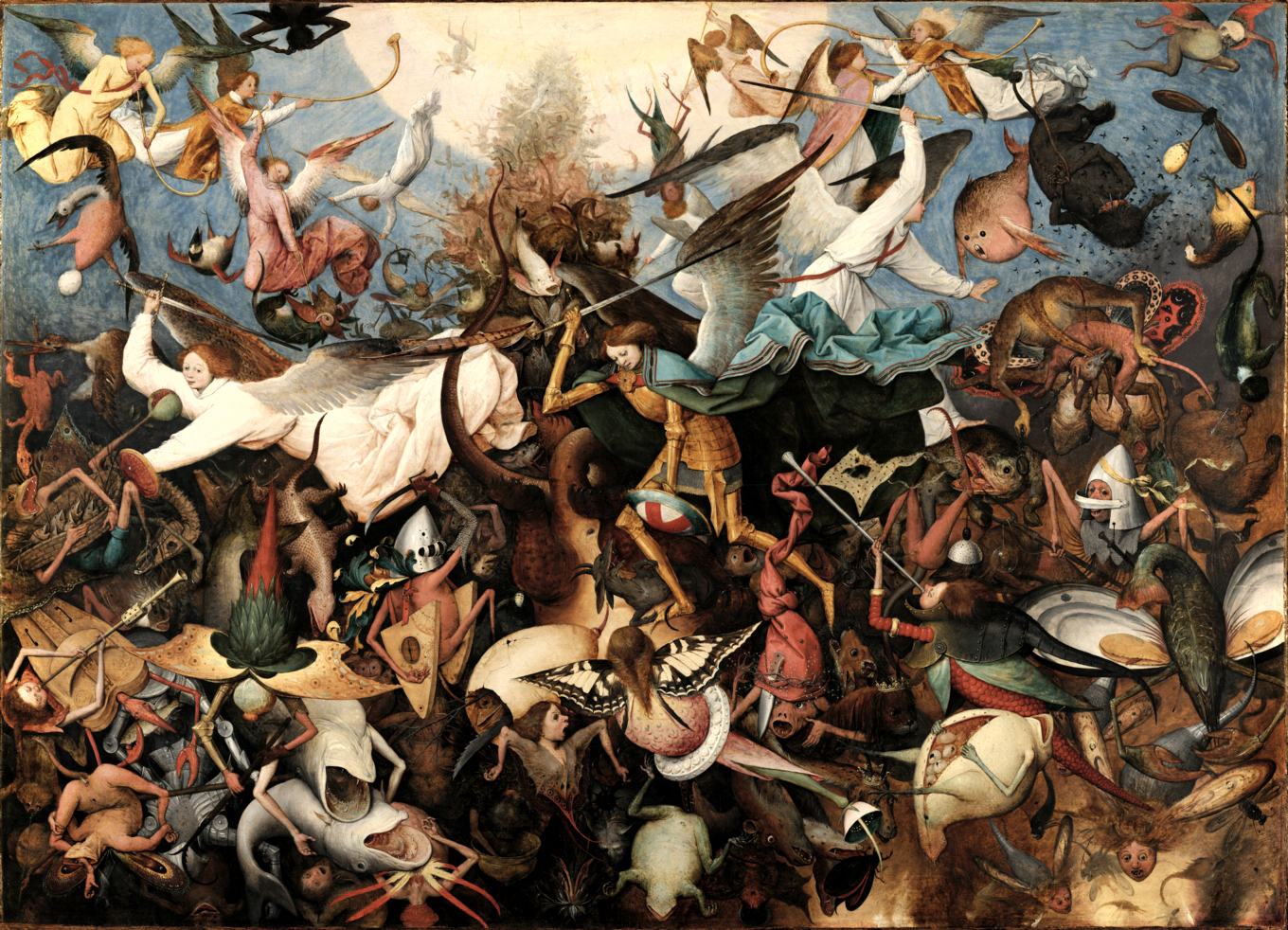
The Fall of the Rebel Angels — painting by the Flemish painter Pieter Bruegel the Elder (1562)

I. V. Neronova characterized the narrative strategy used in The Lame Fate as follows: the narration is conducted in the first person and is limited to the sphere of direct vision and the character's location — for the narration, only those events in which Felix Sorokin is a participant are selected. Boris Strugatsky also emphasized that according to the author's intention, the entire novel was supposed to consist of "begun and unfinished stories," since to a significant extent the real world consists of such unfinished stories. That is, the main plot line includes many other plots not connected to the main action, but serving as a necessary link for interpretation and excluded from the narration and the main hero's knowledge. The first-person narration indicates that information about the world must be certified by the characters, and only then do they acquire the status of facts. None of the mystical episodes receives such certification: for example, what is happening at the Banya (even before Sorokin's first visit there) causes heated disputes among writers whose observations do not match each other: "The disciplined Garik went there right away, back in October. Absolutely nothing interesting. A rather shabby machine. A loafer in a black robe takes your manuscript from you and feeds it into the receiving slot sheet by sheet. Numbers light up on the display, and then you can calmly go home. Zhora, who was there just before the New Year, objected that there was no machine there, but some gray cabinets, the loafer was not in a black robe but in a white one, and it smelled of baked potatoes there".

When Sorokin himself encounters mystical plots, he perceives them in a everyday key, describing them as strange but not exceeding the bounds of the possible. He compares the story of the fallen angel to plots by H. G. Wells, perceiving it as banal begging, albeit a very original one. In all such episodes, confirmation of the mystical nature of what happened does not occur. When Sorokin gives the score of the trumpets of the Last Judgment to an acquaintance composer, this plot line ends in a comic way: Goga Chachua did not even understand what he had in his hands; he was worried about the loss of his favorite sports team. Here, the conflict of form and content is actively used, and reader expectations are deliberately deceived. On the one hand, the mystical is narrated as everyday, all strange events are given realistic explanations, on the other—the everyday events acquire for a short time a shade of the extraordinary. Since Sorokin constantly speaks of some wizard who controls his personal fate, he personifies the abstract concept of Fate, included in the novel's title. Felix Alexandrovich quite admits that the operator of the machine for measuring literary talent, Mikhail Afanasyevich, is Mikhail Bulgakov, his favorite writer, as discussed in one of the previous chapters.

On the other hand, everything happening to Sorokin can be interpreted completely realistically, including the mysterious Methuselah elixir from the numbered institute (this is the explanation that Felix accepts in this particular case). The sharp breaks in plots used in the realistic register allow the introduction into the narration of a series of strange coincidences. If one consistently switches to fantasy, the following series emerges: the Methuselah elixir is indeed the elixir of immortality, the grubby young man with the score is indeed a fallen angel, and Sorokin is not mistaken in identifying Mikhail Afanasyevich's personality either. That is, in the reality of the world of The Lame Fate, the relations of "text—reality" actually operate in reverse to reality: the text is a generating factor for reality. At the point of indeterminacy of interpretation, when the reader is unable to determine whether to interpret the described in a realistic or supernatural key, the effect of the fantastic arises. At the same time, the Strugatskys did not use the open ending typical for them, (Note: In contrast, V. P. Izotov asserted that both novellas of The Lame Fate have an open ending, since the Strugatskys in no way help their reader to unambiguously interpret the work.) which is connected with the installation on the realistic tradition, in which the reader does not feel the absence of information about the described world. In Yvonne Howell's 1994 dissertation, The Lame Fate was placed in the context of Russian apocalyptic fiction, and especially Master and Margarita. The researcher believed that the Strugatskys' interest in eschatology was determined by their life experience of the "post-apocalyptic" generation, born after the revolution and having experienced the war. The double structure of the novel reflects the duality of Sorokin's existence, who works both in the stream of official literature and in opposition to it. He lives in a quite tangible physically Third Rome and writes about a city in which an ancient as the world struggle of good against evil is taking place; the boundary between these cities is easily permeable. And into modern Moscow everyday life penetrate fantastic characters and events from symbolic reality. Thus, the type in a checkered coat who began surveillance of the writer clearly reminds one of Koroviev-Fagott. In the novel Master and Margarita, the materialization of the "checkered citizen" in front of Berlioz is the first sign of the impending death of the editor, of which this "checkered" one turns out to be the sole witness. In the continuous dialogue with Bulgakov, Sorokin acts as a modern Master, fully understanding: "It will never be published in my lifetime, because I see not a single publisher on my horizon to whom I could explain that my visions have value at least for a dozen people in the world besides myself". A principled distinction of the Strugatskys' novel from the object of polemic in Bulgakov is that in Sorokin's world, the religious dimension is fundamentally absent, and the resulting void is filled with the ubiquitous ideological system. What was for Bulgakov in the 1930s "vaudeville pranks of Woland" is for Sorokin part of everyday life: censorship, the triumph of atheism, and mass brainwashing.

Here it is, morning now. Who in ten-million Moscow, having woken up, remembered Leo Tolstoy? Except perhaps schoolchildren who did not prepare their lesson on War and Peace… Shaker of souls. Lord of minds. Mirror of the Russian Revolution. Maybe he ran from Yasnaya Polyana precisely because at the end of his life this simple and so deadly thought came to him. And he was a believer, I suddenly thought. It was easier for him, much easier. We know for sure: there is nothing BEFORE and nothing AFTER. The usual melancholy took hold of me. Between two NOTHINGS a weak spark skips, that's all our existence. And there are no rewards for us, no retributions in the upcoming NOTHING, and no hope that this spark will someday and somewhere skip again.

== Critics ==
Immediately after the publication of the magazine version of The Lame Fate, the novella aroused the interest of critics. In a voluminous review by S. Piskunova and V. Piskunov from the magazine Oktyabr, the connection of science fiction with ,menippean mainstream prose was emphasized, and it was noted that the creative evolution of the Strugatskys went from "pure science fiction", in the crooked mirrors of which reality was reflected, to the "reportage" recreation of the writer's world of Moscow. The genre of the novella was defined as a "text about texts" and in this regard standard for the grotesque-fantastic genre, oriented toward the secondary nature of the created artistic world and based on quotation and allusions. The Lame Fate is also quite comparable to The Alchemist Danilov, primarily due to the consistency of "flight" and "everyday life". At the same time, the fact that all events around Sorokin can be interpreted in two ways, three ways, and to the nth degree allows one to understand that he has become the object of some experiment. The possibility of such an interpretation in the magazine version was emphasized by the echo with City of the Doomed, in whose world the Experiment was indeed conducted, the main condition of which was the uncertainty of goals. Mark Amusin, considering the magazine version of The Lame Fate in the context of the entire work of the Strugatskys, noted that this work is built on the demonstration of the writer's "technology". Each of the incidents with Felix Sorokin can be developed into a complete fantastic or adventure-adventure work, but the "teasing of these possibilities" remains unrealized. The shadow of Mikhail Afanasyevich Bulgakov hovering over the entire structure gives the reflections on the nature and psychology of creativity, criteria for evaluations, and motives of the writer's activity "special sharpness and ambiguity". Philosopher Vyacheslav Serbinenko considered the work of the Strugatskys in a utopian context. In his 1989 article, The Lame Fate and The Ugly Swans were reviewed without any connection to each other, based on magazine publications, with The Ugly Swans being analyzed much more voluminously and deeply. In a global sense, The Lame Fate can be viewed through the prism of the Strugatskys' general theme—the contact with cosmic superintelligence, relying on a hint: Sorokin reports that the book he wrote Modern Fairy Tales is Martian Chronicles by Ray Bradbury "inside out", a story about how "aliens", "visitors" "mastered our Earth". V. Serbinenko refused "to see in this hero some composite self-portrait of the writers, even despite the fact that his biography seems to correspond to the questionnaire data of the elder of the brothers". Contact is also carried out at another level in the form of a direct echo with M. A. Bulgakov. In the finale of The Lame Fate, in the philosopher's interpretation, the spirit of Bulgakov finally transforms into Woland: "The Strugatskys clearly underestimated the distance and too decisively stepped onto someone else's creative shore as their own." Accordingly, Mikhail Afanasyevich "reminds one of a self-confident stranger trying to act in a world that is not close to him and little known". In the 21st century, the literary-critical reception of the novel has practically not changed. In the biography of A. Skalandis The Strugatsky Brothers, the author calls The Lame Fate a self-sufficient work that did not need additions from City of the Doomed and The Ugly Swans. In addition, this is the only attempt in the Strugatskys' work to write an autobiographical novella and the only novella in which the topography and life of real Moscow are reflected. In the book by Dmitry Volodihin and Gennady Prashkevich, published in the "Lives of Remarkable People" series, the content is retold in detail with quotes, and the conclusion is made that sooner or later the Strugatskys had to turn to the theme of the writer's fate. In the monograph of political scientist Yu. Chernyakhovskaya, The Lame Fate is considered a transitional text diagnosing the deepest crisis of the Strugatskys' social optimism, their transition to a state of ideological vacuum: "They lose connection with the communist system of values, but cannot accept the capitalist one". Philosopher Boris Mezhuyev in the 2010s proposed a revisionist reevaluation of the Strugatskys' work, related to the reassessment of the role of the co-author brothers in the creative tandem and their ideological and worldview evolution:

Very noticeably, the elder of the brothers was greatly influenced by Bulgakov's great novel, and everything that was created predominantly by Arkady Natanovich was marked by obvious literary rivalry with the author of Master and Margarita: here is The Lame Fate with the well-known conflict of the writer's environment and the lonely master with a novel doomed to obscurity <…>. …That tinge of "misanthropy" that is very palpable in the "mature" Strugatskys was most likely evidence of the ever-increasing role of the younger brother in this mysterious creative tandem.
