= Reflection (philosophy) =

Examining and comparative mode of thinking

Reflection means a form of thoughtful and comparative thinking. Different types of reflection can be distinguished.

On the one hand, there is self-reflection, i.e. thinking about oneself or one's own behavior. The corresponding verb is reflect and stands for to ponder, think through or contemplate.

In philosophy, there have also been subject-specific uses of the concept since the 17th century, which are based on this concept and emphasize different aspects. For example, reflection on social relations or the use of language.

The central concern is the distinction between perception aimed at external objects and the kind of mental activity that reflects on the acts of thinking and representation themselves (abstraction).

== Ancient and modern foundations ==
A “knowledge of knowledge” (ἐπιστήμης ἐπιστήμη, Episteme) is already mentioned by Plato (Charmides 171c), Aristotle calls it the “thinking of thinking” in the context of a discussion of Eudaimonia, which for him arises from intellectual activity in general:

“now if he who sees perceives that he sees, and hears that he hears, and as one who walks perceives that he walks, and if in everything else there is likewise a perception that we are active, so that we thus perceive that we perceive, and think that we think: and that we perceive and think is a sign to us that we are (...)”.

Finally, the return of the spirit to itself, epistrophé in Greek, becomes a central concept in Neoplatonism, especially in Proclus. In the Middle Ages, epistrophé was initially translated as reditio, return, or conversio, conversion. However, Thomas Aquinas also used reflexio.

Following Descartes' mirror metaphors, numerous controversial theories of reflection emerged. Nevertheless, 'the definition of Leibniz — La réflexion n'est autre chose qu'une attention à ce qui est en nous' (”Reflection is nothing but attention to what is within us“) would likely have been accepted as a common view within the Cartesian tradition up to Husserl. These foundations gave rise to distinctions that increasingly differentiated “reflection” from the prevailing psychological notion of introspection.

== John Locke ==
After reflection in English and réflexion in French had become established as colloquial terms in the 17th century, John Locke's treatment of reflection in his An Essay Concerning Human Understanding (1690) became decisive for further philosophical debates on the subject. Locke distinguishes between the perception of external objects and the perception of processes in our own souls such as “perceiving, thinking, doubting, believing, reasoning, knowing, willing”, including the associated feelings of “satisfaction or dissatisfaction”:

And such are perception, thinking, doubting, believing, reasoning, knowing, willing, and all the different actings of our own minds;—which we being conscious of, and observing in ourselves, do from these receive into our understandings as distinct ideas as we do from bodies affecting our senses. This source of ideas every man has wholly in himself; and though it be not sense, as having nothing to do with external objects, yet it is very like it, and might properly enough be called INTERNAL SENSE. But as I call the other Sensation, so I call this REFLECTION, the ideas it affords being such only as the mind gets by reflecting on its own operations within itself.

It remains unclear whether reflection should be seen as dependent on external perception or as an independent source of knowledge, since Locke — drawing on Descartes, who, admittedly, did not yet use the term 'reflection' — also asserts that reflection is an independent source of knowledge.

== The concept of reflection in the Enlightenment ==
For Immanuel Kant and his transcendental philosophy, reflection was an essential means of cognition and knowledge, emphasizing the role of the associated concepts and their necessary distinction, cf. → critical philosophy. By tracing these activities back to the thinker's own ego, he also named them with his own ‘concepts of reflection’ (Reflexionsbegriffen), namely unity and difference, attunement and conflict, the inner and the outer, matter and form (CPR B 316 ff.). Reference should also be made here to the amphiboly of concepts of reflection (CPR B 326).

The idea that reflection means a loss of immediacy is first found in François Fénelon and was propagated above all by Jean-Jacques Rousseau: “The state of reflection is a state against Nature.” A well-known literary treatment of this theme is Heinrich von Kleist's Über das Marionettentheater, which states:

“We see that to the extent that reflection becomes darker and weaker in the organic world, grace emerges ever more radiant and dominant.”

Johann Gottfried Herder pointed out that reflection is dependent on language: only language makes it possible to capture individual moments in an “ocean of sensations” on which the mind can reflect. As people drew on what they had already achieved in the past, which they expanded and improved, Herder ultimately saw spiritual history (Geistesgeschichte) as a “supra-individual context of reflection”.

== Kant and German idealism ==
Immanuel Kant deals with the concepts of reflection of his predecessors in an appendix to the transcendental analytic of the Critique of Pure Reason. Here he speaks of amphiboly, i.e. the ambiguity of these concepts of reflection, since they either “abstract from all conditions of contemplation (...) so, of course, nothing remains for us in the mere concept but the interior in general” (B 339, 341); or the concepts of understanding are completely “sensibilized”, so that one can only determine their difference and their contradiction. The former was Leibniz's mistake, the latter Locke's (B 327). He therefore calls for a transcendental reflection, through which it must first be determined whether concepts “are compared with one another as belonging to pure understanding or to sensory perception” (B 317) - he calls it transcendental, because it “identifies the subjective conditions under which we can arrive at concepts” and “does not have to do with the objects themselves” from which the concepts are to be obtained (B 316).

In his Wissenschaftslehre of 1794, Johann Gottlieb Fichte distinguishes between “reflection” and ‘striving’ as the two fundamental activities of the “absolute I”. At a first stage, they bring about the “I-ness” as an “activity that goes back into itself and determines itself”. Through further “free reflection”, what is initially still connected is separated and “absorbed into a new form, the form of knowledge or consciousness” whereby reflection becomes the “being for itself of knowledge”, which, however, can never fully realize its ground, namely its freedom and unity. The “essential basic law of reflection” is that knowledge always retains the form of “that and that”, which leads to the fact that “reflection on reflection” always makes “the world appear in a new form”. The connection between reflection and immediacy is accessible in love, which for Fichte is defined as the “reflection that purely destroys itself in God”.

For Friedrich Wilhelm Joseph Schelling, the “sphere of reflection and separation” is characteristic of man, but at the same time signifies “a spiritual illness”. However, since this determines modern consciousness primarily through Christianity as a “separation of the infinite and the finite”, it must be dealt with. Schelling undertakes this in the System of Transcendental Idealism (1800), in which “free reflection” is given the task of bringing the ego to an awareness of itself as standing opposite the mere organism. Reflection is “analytical”, but refers to a prior “synthetic intuition” in which the contemplating and the contemplated are identical.

Schelling criticizes Fichte for never escaping "the circle of consciousness" with his positing of the I through the I, thus failing to reach the independently given objects of nature. However, it is difficult to spare Schelling himself from this same reproach.

Georg Wilhelm Friedrich Hegel defines modern philosophy in an essay from 1802 as the "philosophy of reflection of subjectivity," but criticizes that in the works of his predecessors, the separation between finite consciousness and an empty Absolute always remains. He developed his own conception of reflection in the Science of Logic (1812–1816) and in the Encyclopedia of the Philosophical Sciences (from 1816).

Hegel distinguishes between “being” as pure immediacy and ‘essence’, whose “own determination” is reflection. Reflection “posits” the identity of essence, thereby presupposing being on the one hand, but at the same time “positing” it itself. The “positing reflection” is therefore accompanied by an ‘external’ reflection that negates the posited being, precisely because it is posited by the reflection, whereby it is “the abolition of this positing of it” and “in negating it negates this negating of it”. Finally, the “determining reflection” shows that posited and external reflection are one, because the latter is nothing but the “immanent reflection of immediacy itself”. This results in identity, difference and contradiction as “reflection determinations”, whereby reflection “perishes” in the latter, in the double sense of the expression. The “infinite reflection” leads from “essence”, which has the character of a ‘substance’, to the purely subjective “concept” as the third stage of development of Hegel's logic. In the sphere of the concept, reflection, which until then had only constituted the “movement” from being to essence, “articulates” itself as judgment and resolution.

From this “reflection in general”, Hegel distinguishes the “reflection of consciousness”, which he developed in the Phenomenology of Spirit (1806), and the “more specific reflection of the understanding”, which discusses the conditions of perception from various points of view. Within the overall process of his philosophy, which describes the coming of the Absolute, he also identifies the being and consciousness of the individual human being as a “stage of reflection”.

== Phenomenology and existentialism ==
According to Hegel, Jakob Friedrich Fries traced reflection back to “direct knowledge of reason” on the one hand, while on the other he defined it empirically as a faculty of “inner self-observation”. As a result, the tendency towards a “psychologistic” approach, in which reflection itself was treated as an empirical object, intensified. In contrast, Franz Brentano emphasized that “inner perception ... can never become inner observation”, but merely accompanies the observations. Edmund Husserl's phenomenology was based on this insight:

Husserl sees reflection as the “method of consciousness for the knowledge of consciousness in general”. Since for him only the contents of consciousness can be the subject of a strictly scientific philosophy, it thus has a “universal methodological function”. He formulates a gradual order of reflections, because the “reflections are again experiences and as such can become substrates of new reflections, and so in infinitum”, whereby the previously experienced facts are recorded in the “retention”. Finally, the “pure I” is thus visualized. Husserl's phenomenological and existentialist successors criticized this “reduction to pure subjectivity”. Merleau-Ponty pointed out that, on the one hand, with this approach the world becomes so transparent to the ego that it is incomprehensible why Husserl took the detour via it at all; on the other hand, reflection always encounters a pre-reflective “impenetrability” (opacité) of the world. Reflection must examine and develop its possibilities in the face of this impenetrability:

“what is given is neither consciousness nor a pure being, but, as Kant himself has profoundly expressed it, experience, in other words the communication of a finite subject with an impenetrable being from which it emerges, but in which it nevertheless remains engaged.”

From this it follows: “Reflection is never able to elevate itself above all situations ... it is always given to itself experientially (erfahrungsmäßig)- in a Kantian sense of the word experience: it arises without itself knowing where from, it gives itself to me as given by nature.”

In Being and Nothingness, Jean-Paul Sartre describes the failure of reflection in its “double simultaneous effort to objectify and internalize”.

"Reflection remains a permanent possibility of the for-itself as an attempt to take over being. Through reflection, the for-itself, which loses itself outside itself, tries to remember itself in its being"

But “the turning back of being to itself can only make a distance appear between that which turns back and that to which the turning back takes place” - a split that “only makes the nothingness that separates consciousness from itself even deeper and more insurmountable”.

Sartre distinguishes between a total of three “processes of non-sense”: firstly, the non-sense of the “for-itself”, which loses itself ‘outside’, “with the to-itself and in the three temporal ecstasies” past, present and future; Secondly, the attempt to regain oneself, as just described; thirdly and finally, the nullification through “being-for-others”, which Sartre calls ‘impure’ or “complicit reflection”, because it pursues the impossible goal of “simultaneously being other and remaining itself”.

Karl Jaspers, referring to Kierkegaard, calls “existential self-reflection” “a medium that never closes to me”. On the one hand, “I search for myself” in it “as emerging from my judgment of myself”, a process that cannot be concluded in principle; on the other hand, although I am constantly uncovering new possibilities, I run the risk of destroying “every beginning of my actuality”. “Existence can only come to itself in the constant danger of the endlessness of its reflection”, in which it “dares to be boundlessly open.”

Martin Heidegger deals with the concept of reflection in Kant's Thesis about Being (1962). Kant's transcendental reflection is “reflection on the network of places in the place of being”, whereby thinking is in play “once as reflection and then as reflection of reflection”. The former provides “the horizon” in which “such things as positedness, oppositeness can be seen”, the latter “the procedure by which ... the being seen in the horizon of positedness is interpreted”. According to Heidegger, this is a dichotomy that is fundamental to “the entire history of Western thought”.

Paul Ricœur refers to Fichte and his reception in French philosophy when he describes reflection as the “reappropriation of our striving for existence”. What distinguishes the philosophy of reflection from the Cartesian philosophy of consciousness is that in it the ego is “neither given in a psychological evidence nor in an intellectual intuition”:

Reflection is the endeavor to reclaim the ego of the ‘ego cogito’ in the mirror of its objects, its works and finally its actions.

== Communication theories and philosophy of language ==
In the 20th century, the questions of reflection and reflexivity were raised anew through the formative influence of philosophy of science and philosophy of language, linguistics and structuralism. They are particularly pronounced in post-analytic philosophy (in its attempt to reintegrate empiricism and the semantics of reflection) as well as in communication theories, especially discourse and systems theories. In this communication paradigm, the new thematization is also reflected in the influence of Martin Heidegger (1889-1976) and Hans-Georg Gadamer (1900-2002). In Herbert Schnädelbach's analysis, reflection is traditionally the thinking of thinking, which is generally useful and systematizable as philosophy and today, more precisely, as methodological-rational philosophy. The methodological systematization of ‘reflection’ makes it possible to transform the pre-analytical, mentalistic understanding of reflection in the discourse theories following Jürgen Habermas and Karl-Otto Apel as well as in the linguistic and post-analytical philosophies and to critically differentiate it there. The idea of mirroring is abandoned. Schnädelbach formulates the relationship between reflection and method at the beginning of his main work Reflexion und Diskurs (1977):

"Anyone who talks about philosophical questions of method exposes himself to the suspicion of talking about philosophy instead of philosophizing. However, if the discussion of methodological issues is part of philosophy, one can obviously only talk about philosophy in a philosophical way, and one must do so if one considers methodological issues to be relevant in philosophy. ... The philosophical tradition calls such a self-thematization of ways of thematizing (in an optical metaphor) reflection, and it explicates this above all in modern times - roughly speaking: from Descartes to Husserl - in mentalistic terms: as thinking of thinking (Denken des Denkens), Knowing of Knowing (Erkennen des Erkennens), consciousness of consciousness, etc. It links what is explicated in this way with the consciousness of consciousness. It links what is thus explicated with the task of a philosophical justification of philosophy, which in turn is to justify science and morality. Reflection thus becomes the medium of the self-justification of philosophy, i.e. the process of solving a problem that is itself reflexively structured. >Reflection< is therefore the most important concept of method in modern philosophy."

Here, reflection as justification - in the sense of reasons for validity of practical philosophy - goes beyond reflection as self-observation (this represents a demarcation from empiricist and system-theoretical theories). A third distinction to be made in Schnädelbach's theory of reflection is reflection as a clarification of concepts (analogous to his analytical separation of normative, descriptive and explicative discourses). With regard to reflection as the justification of actions, Jürgen Habermas emphasizes the communicative anchoring of reflection in the lecture series The Philosophical Discourse of Modernity (1983/84):

"Of course, ‘reflection’ is no longer a matter of the subject of knowledge referring to itself in an objectifying way. This pre-linguistic, unified reflection is replaced by the layering of discourse and action built into communicative action."

In Niklas Luhmann's systems theory, reflection refers to a certain form of self-reference of social systems, namely that in which the system bases its operations on the difference between system and umwelt. Self-reference serves autopoietic reproduction, i.e. the reproduction of the system from within itself; the orientation towards the difference between system and umwelt allows the system to choose conditioning by the environment itself, which can become relevant if the system as such is called into question. Luhmann formulated, also with regard to mental systems (with reference to Jurgen Ruesch/Gregory Bateson for undisputed standards of psychiatric theories):

“Any analysis of self-description or, in classical terminology, of ”reflection" will have to assume that the system remains operationally unreachable for itself and thus also opaque for its own operations. ... This may be the reason why the classical theories of self-reflection, be it of consciousness or of “spirit”, work with the schema determinate/indeterminate. ... In Hegel's theory, this becomes a problem through the dialectic of disciplined transitions."

Theories of reflection work in different ways and approaches with the paradox of a blind spot in every observation, Kant's refraining from himself, Martin Heidegger's insinuation, Hans-Georg Gadamer's already being-in-language or Jacques Derrida's deconstruction theorem; not least in order to grasp that which cannot be described, at least as “indeterminate”. Following Hegel, Theodor Adorno who continued to work most extensively on this issue, was prompted to develop a negative dialectic. In this theoretical position, reflection is the mental reference back to what thinking can and cannot think in thinking (or to what conversations and other communications can and cannot communicate in communication).

== See also ==
- Five Ws
- Gotthard Günther
- Contemplation
- Self-consciousness
- Self-knowledge
- Navel gazing

== Literature ==
Chronological

- René Descartes: Discours de la méthode pour bien conduire sa raison et chercher la vérité dans les sciences. 1637 (deutsch: Abhandlung über die Methode des richtigen Vernunftgebrauchs und der wissenschaftlichen Wahrheitsforschung).
- John Locke: An Essay concerning Humane Understanding. 1690 (deutsch: Ein Versuch über den menschlichen Verstand).
- Georg Wilhelm Friedrich Hegel: Phänomenologie des Geistes. 1806/1807.
- Edmund Husserl: Ideen zu einer reinen Phänomenologie und phänomenologischen Philosophie. Erstes Buch: Allgemeine Einführung in die reine Phänomenologie. Niemeyer, Halle (Saale) 1913.
- Hans Wagner: Philosophie und Reflexion. München, Basel 1959. 3. Auflage. 1980, ISBN 3-497-00937-7
- Herbert Schnädelbach: Reflexion und Diskurs. Fragen einer Logik der Philosophie. Frankfurt am Main 1977, ISBN 3-518-06408-8
- Niklas Luhmann: Soziale Systeme. Grundriss einer allgemeinen Theorie. Frankfurt am Main 1984, ISBN 3-518-57684-4
- Lothar Zahn: Art. Reflexion. In: Joachim Ritter, Karlfried Gründer (Hrsg.): Historisches Wörterbuch der Philosophie. Band 8. Wissenschaftliche Buchgesellschaft, Darmstadt 1992, Sp. 396–405.
- Andreas Arndt: Dialektik und Reflexion: Zur Rekonstruktion des Vernunftbegriffs. Meiner, Hamburg 1994, ISBN 3-7873-2329-5
- Johannes Heinrichs: Logik des Sozialen, Woraus Gesellschaft entsteht. München 2005, ISBN 954-449-199-6
