= Johannes Heinrichs =

German philosopher (born 1942)

- Born: 1942 (age 83–84)

Education
- Education: University of Bonn (PhD)
- Thesis: Die Logik der „Phänomenologie des Geistes“ (1972)
- Doctoral advisor: Klaus Hartmann

Philosophical work
- Era: Contemporary philosophy
- Region: Western philosophy
- School: German idealism
- Website: https://www.johannesheinrichs.de/

Johannes Heinrichs (September 17, 1942 in Rheinhausen, present-day Duisburg) is a German social philosopher and semiotician.

== Life ==
After graduating from the Städtisches Naturwissenschaftliches Gymnasium in Rheinhausen, Johannes Heinrichs entered the Jesuit novitiate in Eringerfeld Castle in 1962. From 1964, he took up basic studies in philosophy at the Jesuit College of Philosophy in Pullach im Isartal, which he completed in 1967 with a degree in philosophy. In addition to his philosophical studies at LMU Munich, Heinrichs was a tutor (assistant) there until 1970. In 1970, he went to the Hegel-Archiv in Bochum with a scholarship from the German National Academic Foundation to prepare his Hegel dissertation Die Logik der „Phänomenologie des Geistes“ and completed his doctorate in 1972 under Klaus Hartmann in Bonn (summa cum laude; second assessor Gerhart Schmidt). He received the Geffrub Prize from the University of Bonn for this work in 1973. After gaining a degree in theology at the Philosophical-Theological School of St. Georgen in Frankfurt am Main, being ordained as a priest in the Frankfurt Cathedral in 1974 and research studies in Paris, he was awarded his habilitation at the same university in 1975. In addition to his aforementioned Hegel book, his habilitation achievements included the script for the lecture Social Philosophy, which was published in 1976 under the title Reflexion als soziales System zu einer Reflexions-Systemtheorie der Gesellschaft and in 2005 in edited form under the title Logik des Sozialen. Wie Gesellschaft entsteht partly appeared in print.

From 1975, he taught philosophy, particularly social philosophy, at the Frankfurter Hochschule Philosophie. He dealt with Catholic social doctrine in a new way, in close personal contact with its nestor Oswald von Nell-Breuning. In 1977, however, he gradually resigned from the Jesuit order due to his fundamental criticism of the institutionalized church, thus renouncing his Chair. After a transitional period as spiritual rector and lecturer at the Catholic Academy for Adult Education (fall 1978 to spring 1981), he switched from the Roman Catholic to the Old Catholic Church in 1981, which he left again in 1983.

In 1981 and 1982, he held a deputy chair for Kant research at the University of Bonn, after which, despite numerous applications for a “secular” philosophy professorship, he only had teaching and research assignments (including from the German Research Foundation), which he attributes to the concordat conditions at German-speaking universities, i.e. specifically to the right of church-dependent professors to have a say in the appointment process. From 1998 to 2002, he succeeded the late GDR dissident Rudolf Bahro at the Humboldt University of Berlin with a visiting professorship for social ecology as part of an endowed professorship from the Schweisfurth-Stiftung. Today, Heinrichs lives as a writer (over 40 philosophical books, 170 partly false, partly popular articles and an autobiography Das Recht nicht zu lügen, published in 2023, several volumes of poetry) and lecturer in Duisburg and Berlin, and occasionally in Auroville in southern India. He teaches as part of guest lectures and talks all over the world and was a member of various philosophical and cultural-political societies, from 1999 to 2013 on the Academic Advisory Board of the Vereins Deutsche Sprache (German Language Association).

== Philosophy ==
Heinrichs views philosophy as the progressive self-development of methodical reflection. For him, it means both the form and the content of philosophical thought. As a form, it is subsequent, theoretical reflection (afterthought); as content, it means lived self-reference (lived reflection, the life of consciousness and the reality of action of the individual and society). Theoretical reflection has the task of reconstructing the life of consciousness. This basic understanding of philosophy connects him most with Georg Wilhelm Friedrich Hegel, but he wants to transfer his dialectic of the negativity of the other into a no less systematic dialog. This bridges the gap between classical German philosophy and dialogical language thinking: both currents are relational thinking. The I-It-relation (dialectic) can be thought together with the I-Thou relation (dialogic). His 1972 dissertation on Logik der Phänomenologie des Geistes was devoted to this bridge-building. After Heinrichs had analyzed the dialogical relationship as a reflective relationship between people with a limited sequence of four steps of reflection in 1975 (this practical-social reflection and its gradation represents a fundamental discovery for his thinking), a comprehensive reflective system theory of the social developed from the early “transcendental dialogics”.

However, Heinrichs makes a strict distinction between the collective-social perspective and the perspective of individual actors. Based on the insight that action should also be reconstructed in the broader sense of meaningful processes (consciousness processes), he founded a philosophical semiotics as a theory of meaningful processes. While semiotics is normally understood as an individual scientific group of disciplines dealing with given signs, philosophical semiotics determines the place of signs in the overall human meaningfulness. From an individual perspective, the four levels of reflection in social relations find an analogous expression in four comprehensive semiotic levels that build on each other in a reflective manner: Action - Language - Art - Mysticism. The books on the theory of action and language, first published in 1980/81 and republished in 2007-2009 in a greatly expanded edition, as well as the writings on the theory of art and mysticism, provisionally published in essay form, apply to these four semiotic levels. The reflective-theoretical connection of all theoretical parts (epistemology, anthropology, natural philosophy, social philosophy, theory of action, theory of language, philosophy of religion, ontology and ethics) is summarized in the book “Integral Philosophy”, published in 2014.

=== Restructuring democracy ===
The theory of action is expanded into a system theory of action, but in contrast to that of Talcott Parsons, through the unified viewpoint of social reflection, at the same time into a reflection system theory. This is essentially characterized by four value-graded levels or subsystems that build on each other reflexively (reflection system theory of the four-level structure or the four-level “value-level democracy”), namely the economy, politics, culture and the system of legitimacy or basic values. In the 1990s, these system levels of society, which have been the subject of discussion since 1975, led Heinrichs to a new model of democracy characterized by four area-specific, logically reflective parliaments (through a framework-setting priority regulation of 4 after 1), the economic, political, cultural and fundamental value parliament. For him, the distinction between these sub-parliaments is a compelling collective-practical and thus institutional consequence of the system of the social as a system of action and reflection. The area-specific (e.g. annual) elections for the respective sub-parliaments also claim to represent a realistic inner synthesis (not a mere mix) of representative and direct democracy.According to Heinrichs, the power-driven dogmatism of all-round or unified parties (which bundle all issues in an unobjective manner) and the dominance of the economic level are mainly responsible for the global crisis and stagnation of current democracies, particularly at European level. If issue-specific, directly elected parliaments were established, the parties would transform themselves into new-style issue-based parties (if cross-level cartel formation were prohibited in a new party law). Consequently, through a priority regulation between the legislation of the sub-parliaments, starting from the basic values parliament to the economic parliament, there would be an actual realization of basic values, as well as cultural values, while both levels currently remain largely ideological superstructures over an economy-dominated policy. In Heinrichs' value-level democracy, there would be, among other things, an economic democracy for the first time, i.e. specifically an economic parliament with elected representatives of the population specifically for this area; the same would apply to the legal, cultural, ideological and church-political levels.

Current issues also play an important role for Heinrichs, such as Europe's structural problems, which are allegedly based on systems theory and can only be solved as a European value-based democracy; the dominance of the economy over politics in the broadest sense, i.e. over the legal system, culture and the interpretation of fundamental (ideological, ethical) values; a separate cultural parliament for education, science, journalism and art, thereby also freeing science from the non-transparent influences of the economy, political parties and churches and internal, unobjective power structures; accommodation towards immigrants, but recognizing the primacy of the native culture (jus culturae), cultural solidarity of immigrants: A path between new nationalism and a “multi-culti ideology” (cf. “Hospitality of cultures”); a fair coexistence of worldviews and religions in the state (mediated by the Fundamental Values Parliament) instead of confessional privileges; and criticism of the love and sexual morality of the papal encyclicals, in particular Deus caritas est, in which, among other things, he misses an admission of earlier errors. In an open letter attached to his book Handlungen. Das periodische System der Handlungsarten, he criticized Jürgen Habermas in autumn 2007 with regard to his "discourse theory of society", his near-identification of action with language, the play with an ambiguous concept of discourse, etc.

== Publications ==
Heinrichs has written the more than 40 books listed below, as well as over 150 articles in specialist journals and popular magazines and a number of articles in dictionaries and encyclopaedias. His autobiography “Das Recht nicht zu lügen” was also published in 2023 (see below).

- Intentio als Sinn bei Thomas von Aquin. Eine Untersuchung über die differenzierte Einheit des thomanischen Intentionsbegriffes. Philosophische Lizentiatsarbeit Pullach 1967 (PDF; 948 KB).
- Die Logik der „Phänomenologie des Geistes“. 2., durchgesehene Auflage. Bouvier, Bonn 1983, ISBN 3-416-01753-6.
- Reflexion als soziales System. Zu einer Reflexions-Systemtheorie der Gesellschaft. Bouvier, Bonn 1976, ISBN 3-416-01311-5; Neuausgabe als Logik des Sozialen. Woraus Gesellschaft entsteht. Steno, Varna u. a. 2005, ISBN 954-449-199-6.
- Freiheit, Sozialismus, Christentum. Um eine kommunikative Gesellschaft. Bouvier, Bonn 1978, ISBN 3-416-01433-2 (PDF).
- Reflexionstheoretische Semiotik. Bouvier, Bonn
  - Teil 1: Handlungstheorie. Struktural-semantische Grammatik des Handelns. 1980, ISBN 3-416-01596-7 (PDF; 2,07 MB).
  - Teil 2: Sprachtheorie. Philosophische Grammatik der semiotischen Dimensionen. 1981, ISBN 3-416-01625-4.
- Die Logik der Vernunftkritik. Kants Kategorienlehre in ihrer aktuellen Bedeutung. Eine Einführung. Franke, Tübingen 1986, ISBN 3-7720-1726-6.
- Die Liebe buchstabieren. Stichworte zu einem Menschheitsthema. Fischer-Taschenbuch-Verlag, Frankfurt 1987, ISBN 3-596-23867-6; Neuausgabe als Die Liebe buchstabieren. Das grosse ABC für Erlebnis- und Denkfreudige. Deutscher Studien-Verlag, Weinheim 1994, ISBN 3-89271-431-2.
- mit John Hormann: Wörterbuch des Wandels. Einsichten für Manager, Mystiker … und Menschen. mvg-Verlag, München 1991, ISBN 3-478-07620-X.
- Gastfreundschaft der Kulturen. Multikulturelle Gesellschaft in Europa und deutsche Identität. Verlag Die Blaue Eule, Essen 1994, ISBN 3-89206-623-X.
- Ökologik. Tiefenökologie als strukturelle Naturphilosophie. Lang, Frankfurt u. a. 1997, ISBN 3-631-31102-8 (2., überarbeitete Auflage. Öko-Logik. Geistige Wege aus der Klima- und Umweltkatastrophe. Steno, Varna u. a. 2007, ISBN 978-954-449-308-0).
- Sprung aus dem Teufelskreis. Logik des Sozialen und natürliche Wirtschaftsordnung. aktualisierte Neuauflage. Steno, Varna u. a. 2005, ISBN 954-449-200-3.
- Entwurf systemischer Kulturtheorie. Abteilung für Kulturwissenschaften der Universität Krems, Krems 1998, ISBN 3-901806-04-0.
- Philosophie am Scheideweg. Johannes Heinrichs im Interview mit Clemens K. Stepina. 1. Auflage. Passagen Verlag, Wien 2002, ISBN 3-85165-522-2.
- 2003: Revolution der Demokratie. Eine Realutopie für die schweigende Mehrheit. Maas, Berlin 2003, ISBN 3-929010-92-5.
- Das Geheimnis der Kategorien. Die Entschlüsselung von Kants zentralem Lehrstück. MAAS, Berlin 2004, ISBN 3-929010-94-1.
- 2005: Demokratiemanifest für die schweigende Mehrheit. Die „Revolution der Demokratie“ in Kürze. Steno-Verlag, München 2005, ISBN 954-449-201-1.
- Revolution aus Geist und Liebe. Hölderlins „Hyperion“ durchgehend kommentiert. Steno, München u. a. 2007, ISBN 978-954-449-311-0.
- Kultur – in der Kunst der Begriffe. Steno, München u. a. 2007, ISBN 978-954-449-327-1.
- Philosophische Semiotik.
  - Teil 1: Handlungen. Das periodische System der Handlungsarten. 2., vollständig überarbeitete Auflage. Steno, München u. a. 2007, ISBN 978-954-449-319-6.
  - Teil 2: Sprache.
    - Band 1: Die Zeichendimension. Das elementare Spiel der Zeichengestalten. (Sigmatik). Steno, München u. a. 2008, ISBN 978-954-449-345-5.
    - Band 2: Die Bedeutungsdimension. Das subjektive Spiel der objektiven Bedeutungen (Semantik). Steno, München u. a. 2008, ISBN 978-954-449-351-6.
    - Band 3: Die Handlungsdimension. Psychologik der Sprechakte und Dialoganalyse (Pragmatik). Steno, München u. a. 2008, ISBN 978-954-449-352-3.
    - Band 4: Die Satzbauformel. Eine philosophisch begründende Grammatik (Syntax). Steno, München u. a. 2009, ISBN 978-954-449-353-0.
    - Band 5: Textsorten und Stilfiguren oder Die Festspiele des Stils (Stilistik). Steno, München u. a. 2009, ISBN 978-954-449-354-7.
    - Die integrale Systematik der Sprache in 5 Bänden. Steno, München u. a. 2010, ISBN 978-954-449-448-3.
- Sprache spricht mir. Die Summa poetica des Philosophen J.H. Araki, Leipzig 2013, ISBN 978-3-941848-14-6.
- Die Logik des europäischen Traums. Eine systemtheoretische Vision. Academia, St. Augustin 2014, ISBN 978-3-89665-641-4.
- Revolution der Demokratie. Eine konstruktive Bewußtseinsrevolution. Academia, St. Augustin 2014, ISBN 978-3-89665-646-9.
- Integrale Philosophie. Wie das Leben denken lernt: gelebte und ausdrückliche Reflexion. Academia, St. Augustin 2014, ISBN 978-3-89665-647-6.
- Gastfreundschaft der Kulturen: Der Weg zwischen Multikulti und neuem Nationalismus. ibidem-Verlag, Stuttgart 2017, ISBN 978-3-8382-1158-9.
- Kritik der integralen Vernunft. Eine philosophische Psychologie. Band I: Grammatik der menschlichen Bewusstseinsfunktionen. ISBN 978-3-8382-1178-7; Band II: Landkarte des Unbewussten. ibidem-Verlag, Stuttgart 2018, ISBN 978-3-8382-1179-4.
- Integral Philosophy. The Common Logical Roots of Anthropology, Politics, Language, and Spirituality. ibidem-Verlag, Stuttgart 2018, ISBN 978-3-8382-1148-0.
- Value-levels-democracy. The Reflection-System-Theory of Four-segmentation. PRISMA, Auroville, Tamil Nadu, India 2019, ISBN 978-81-933675-7-5.
- Gelebte Reflexion: Schriften zur Reflexions-Systemtheorie. Academia Verlag (Nomos-Verlagsgesellschaft), Baden-Baden 2019, ISBN 978-3-89665-787-9.
- Dialektik jenseits von Hegel und Corona. Integrale Strukturlogik als Hegels Auftrag für eine Philosophie der Zukunft. Academia Verlag (Nomos-Verlagsgesellschaft), Baden-Baden 2020, ISBN 978-3-89665-914-9.
- Dialogik. Kann denn Liebe logisch sein? Academia Verlag (Nomos-Verlagsgesellschaft), Baden-Baden 2020, ISBN 978-3-89665-918-7.
- Das Recht nicht zu lügen. Der Ex-Jesuit im autobiografischen Interview über sexuelle Heuchelei, Staatskirchentum und die akademische Diskurskrankheit Europa Buch, Berlin 2023, ISBN 979-12-201-3408-8.
