= Klaus Hartmann (painter) =

German painter

Klaus Hartmann (born 8 December 1969 in Eisleben) is a German painter living in Wittstock between Berlin and Hamburg.

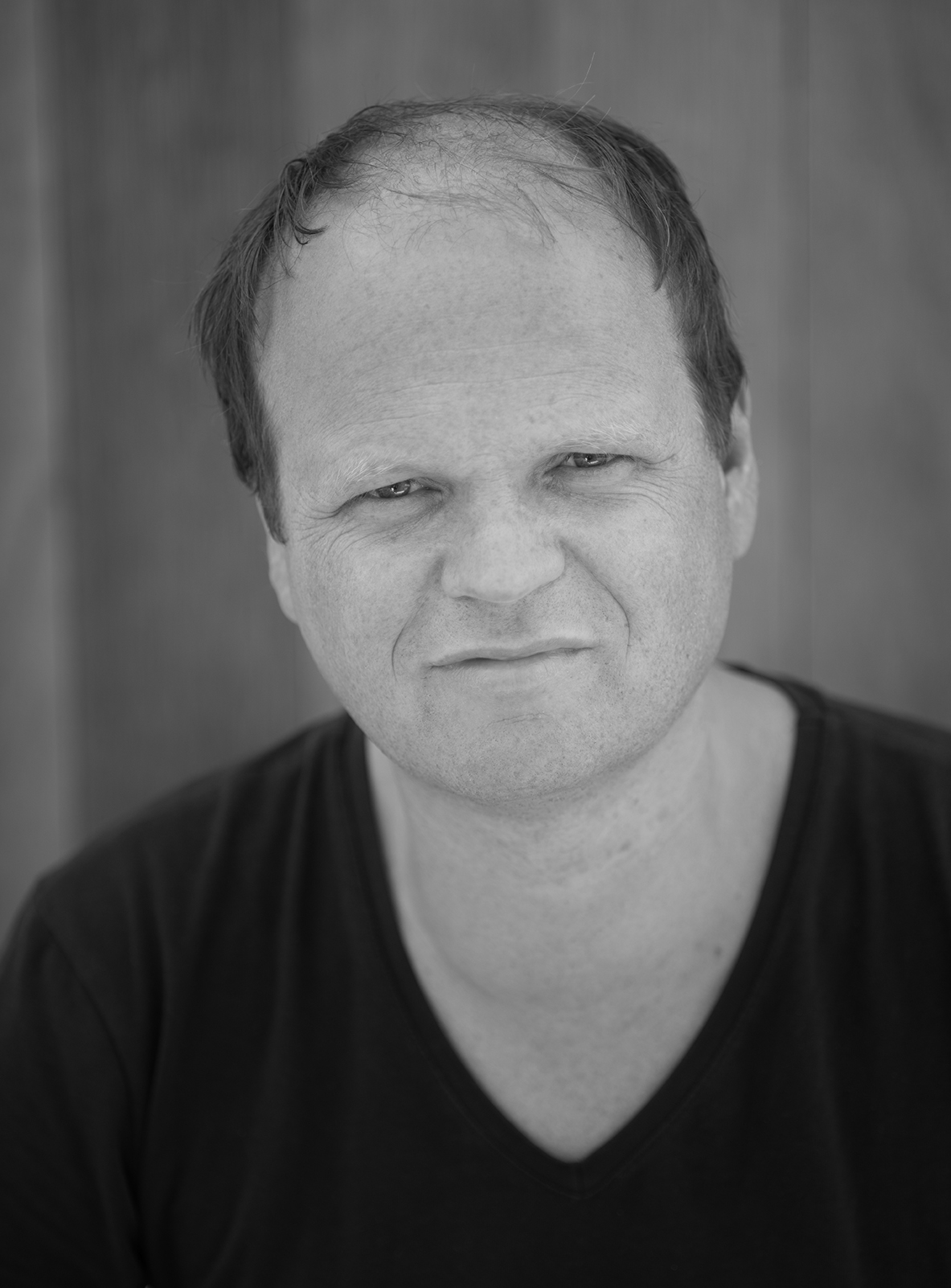
Klaus Hartmann (2016)

After serving his apprenticeship as an orthopedic shoemaker in Erfurt Klaus Hartmann studied from 1991 to 1997 at the University of Fine Arts of Hamburg with Werner Büttner. In 1994, he spent a semester abroad at the Academy of Fine Arts Vienna.

== Work ==
The paintings of Klaus Hartmann are picturesque constructions that originate from the artist's detailed observations. Frequently, he integrates thematic breaks into his pictures that may be interpreted as reflections on society. Early painting themes are garden plots, fairs, Ferris wheels and roller coasters, billboards, rails, pedestrian bridges, different formations of bushes and Chinese restaurants, among others.

Klaus Hartmann travelled to East Africa several times. Between 2006 and 2015, he painted a series of Tanzania paintings that consist predominantly of landscapes. The series of drawings "Along the New Road" has been created since 2016. The series is a collection of typical buildings found in rural areas of Tanzania, Rwanda and Zambia. The viewer slips into the role of a driver who glimpses houses, huts and kiosks as they drive past. The landscape is fictional. A similar drawing project documents houses along the TAZARA Railway between Kapiri Mposhi and Dar es Salaam in 2022. In his animal paintings, Hartmann explores the entanglements of exoticism and colonialism. A recurring motif is the great egret, whose feathers became a symbol of luxury fashion during the colonial era.

== Collections ==
Paintings by Klaus Hartmann are included in many private and museum collections including the Bundeskunstsammlung (The Federal Collection of Contemporary Art), Kunstmuseum Dieselkraftwerk Cottbus (Art Museum Cottbus), Kunstmuseum Bremerhaven (Art Museum Bremerhaven) and The Falckenberg Collection in Hamburg.

== Books ==
Jürgen Becker (ed.) Klaus Hartmann: Jua Toka and The Source of Shades - The Tanzania Paintings, Textem-Verlag, Hamburg 2015, Text Fritz W. Kramer, ISBN 978-3-86485-097-4

Jürgen Becker (ed.) Klaus Hartmann: Candy Station, Textem-Verlag, Hamburg 2017, ISBN 978-3-86485-146-9
