= Klaus Hartmann (philosopher) =

German philosopher (1925–1991)

- Born: 5 September 1925; Berlin, Germany
- Died: 30 June 1991 (aged 65); Tübingen, Germany

Academic background
- Education: University of Bonn (PhD, 1953)
- Theses: Grundzüge der Ontologie Sartres in ihrem Verhältnis zu Hegels Logik (1962); Husserls Einfühlungstheorie auf monadologischer Grundlage (1953)

Academic work
- Era: Contemporary philosophy
- Region: Western philosophy
- School or tradition: Hegelianism
- Institutions: University of Bonn

Klaus Hartmann (German: [ˈhaʁtman]; September 5, 1925 – June 30, 1991) was a German philosopher and university lecturer.

== Life ==
After being a prisoner of war, Hartmann studied philosophy, English and German at the University of Bonn from 1946. He received his doctorate there in 1953 with a thesis on Husserls Einfühlungstheorie auf monadologischer Grundlage, and his habilitation in 1962 with a thesis on Grundzüge der Ontologie Sartres in ihrem Verhältnis zu Hegels Logik. In 1967 he became an associate professor at the University of Bonn; in 1972 he accepted an appointment as a full professor in University of Tübingen.

== Work ==
During the 1960s, Hartmann formulated a non-metaphysical interpretation of Hegel. This interpretation, along with the contributions of Dieter Henrich and other scholars, influenced the renewed academic interest in Hegel during the latter part of the twentieth century.

According to Terry Pinkard, Hartmann's thought represents a revised and purified form of neo-Hegelianism that attempts to respond to and complete the development of neo‑Kantianism in modern German thought just as Hegel himself had attempted to complete the development of Kantian idealism in his own day.

== Reception ==
According to Reinhold Aschenberg Hartmann's book Die Marxsche Theorie. Eine philosophische Untersuchung zu den Hauptschriften (1970) covers "Marx's theory comprehensively in all relevant phases of development and theoretical pieces". "Because the analysis, reconstruction and criticism it offers is unsurpassed in its philosophical level", the book stands out from the philosophical literature on Marx.

Michael Moxter (born 1956), Thomas Grundmann (born 1960) are among his students.

== Selected works in English ==
- (1966), On Taking the Transcendental Turn. The Review of Metaphysics 20, no. 2 (1966): 223–49.
- (1972), Hegel: A Non-Metaphysical View, in A. MacIntyre (ed.) Hegel: A Collection of Critical Essays, New York: Anchor Books, 101–24.

== Selected works in German ==
- Sartres Sozialphilosophie. 1966.
- Marxens Kapital in transzendentalphilosophischer Sicht. 1968.
- Die Marxsche Theorie. 1970.
- Politische Philosophie. 1981.
- Die Philosophie J.-P. Sartres. 2 Unters. zu L'être et le néant u. zur Critique de la raison dialectique. 1983.
- Studies in Foundational Philosophy. 1988.
- Hegels Logik. Hrsg. von Olaf Müller. 1999.
