= Georgy Shchedrovitsky =

Soviet philosopher (1929 - 1994)

- Георгий Щедровицкий
- Born: 23 February 1929; Moscow, USSR
- Died: 3 February 1994 (aged 64); Bolshevo, Russia

Georgy Petrovich Shchedrovitsky (Russian: Георгий Петрович Щедровицкий; 23 February 1929 – 3 February 1994) was a Russian philosopher and methodologist, public and cultural figure. The creator of the system-thinking methodology, the founder and leader of the Moscow methodological circle, the ideological inspirer of the "methodological movement."

== Early years ==
Georgy Shchedrovitsky was born in Moscow in the family of the engineer and organizer of the Soviet aviation industry Pyotr Georgievich Shchedrovitsky (1899–1972) and the microbiologist Kapitolina Nikolaevna Shchedrovitskaya (née Bayukova, 1904–1994). He was great-nephew of Aaron Soltz.

In 1937 he entered the second grade of Moscow secondary school No. 2, in which he studied before the evacuation of his family in the city of Kuibyshev. There, in parallel with his studies at a local school, he worked as a hospital orderly and a grinder at a military factory. In 1943, the family returned to Moscow, and G.P.Shchedrovitsky continued his studies at secondary school No. 150, which he graduated in 1946 with a silver medal.

Since 1946 he studied physics, and since 1949 - at the Faculty of Philosophy of Moscow State University (MSU), which he graduated with honors in 1953. During his studies, he made friends with A. A. Zinoviev, in whose person he found a like-minded person.

In 1951-1958 he worked as a school teacher. In 1957 he published his first scientific article.

== Interdisciplinary methodologies ==
From the 1950s Shchedrovitsky developed a series of seminars which attracted mathematicians, psychologists, historians, architects, sociologists and physicians who focused their discussions of logical and epistemological issues. He became involved in the Moscow Methodological Circle (MMC) set up by Alexander Zinoviev. In 1954, Shchedrovitsky took over leadership of the circle and played a prominent role in developing activity theory. Here the world was not seen as composed of human subjects and objects as in naturalistic theory. Rather objects are secondary constructs whose nature depends on the activity applied to them. Shchedrovitsky argued that activity was not so much an attribute of any individual but rather a system within which an individual is "captured" and which determines how they behave. Further he reflected on the task of the scientist, bearing in mind that a particular complex "object" might be viewed from a number of different scientific perspectives: thus the work of the scientist involves not just examining the object within a specific scientific framework, but must also involve the choice of methodology by which the subject is marked as a distinct subject of scientific enquiry.

In 1958 he joined Vasily Davydov in founding the Commission for The Study of The Psychology of Thought and Logic.

In 1962 he joined Vadim Sadovsky and Erik Yudin, in creating the Interdisciplinary Seminar on Structural and Systemic Methods of Analysis in Science and Technology at the Commission on Cybernetics of the Academy of Sciences of the USSR which was headed by Aksel Berg. Shchedrovitsky headed the Seminar until 1976.

He was a member of the CPSU from 1956 to 1968, was expelled from the party after he signed the so-called "Letter of 170" in support of Alexander Ginzburg and Yuri Galanskov.

== Heritage ==
Without exception, all the works of G.P.Shchedrovitsky (both published and remaining in the archives) are thematically and methodically in line with the works of the MMC. During his lifetime, he published only his two pamphlets, two collective monographs with his participation and about one and a half hundred separate articles written individually or in collaboration.

The regulations of the MMC methodological seminars (at least since 1957) included: the rule of an absence of "ownership of ideas" and orientation to fixing the results in the form of collective monographs.

Collective monographs were prepared, but often not allowed for publication or published in small print runs: for example, the circulation of the collection Problems of the Study of Systems and Structures (1965) was blocked, and the set of the monograph Pedagogy and Logic (1968) was scattered eleven]; the monograph "Development and implementation of automated systems in design" (1975) was published in the industry publishing house in a small edition and led to the repression of the publishers. G.P.Shchedrovitsky was also unable to publish his early book containing an extended version of his dissertation (its partial reconstruction was published only posthumously under the title On the Method of Thinking Research).

After the death of G.P. Shchedrovitsky, his archive was dispersed in at least two places: the widow and his son. Also, the issue of what is the personal working archive of G. P. Shchedrovitsky and what is the archive ("library") of the MMC is not resolved.

Despite the fact that many of G.P.Shchedrovitsky's works dealt with questions of psychology, in modern Russian psychology his ideas remain marginal, his name is rarely cited. A school of psychologists-followers of Shchedrovitsky exists at the Belarusian State Pedagogical University (BSPU). On the other hand, the ideas of G.P.Shchedrovitsky have many supporters in Russian pedagogy.

Nevertheless, during 1995–2007, about twenty books were prepared and published, partly containing lifetime publications, but mainly (especially this applies to the series "From the archive of GP Shchedrovitsky"), which were previously unknown to a wide circle of readers texts, as well as transcripts of reports, lectures and speeches by G. P. Shchedrovitsky. Most of these books were prepared by a team that included the brother of the late philosopher, L. P. Shchedrovitsky, and his widow, G. A. Davydov, who founded the Heritage of the MMC publishing house in 2004.

== Organizational-activity games ==
Shchedrovitsky presented an application of Vygotsky's activity theory with his development of organizational-activity games. These games were based on an application of Vygotsky's content-genetic logic to develop method of collective problem solving.

== Legacy ==
He died in the village of Bolshevo in 1994. The Schedrovitsky Institute for Development was founded in 2005. His son, Petr Shchedrovitsky, continues to use Georgy's techniques to train CEOs.

== Works ==
- Methodological Problems of Systems Research (1964).
- Problems in the development of planning activity
- "Reflexion and Relevant Problems" (1975) in Reflexive Process and Control No. 1 January-June 2002 Volume 1
