= Organizational-activity game =

An organizational-activity game (OAG) is kind of game designed to facilitate organisational change. It is for this reason it is described as a development game, rather than a brainstorming or role-playing game. Generally the game is designed to deal with a specific predetermined concrete problem. They were devised by Georgy Shchedrovitsky of the Moscow Methodological Circle. He brought together various people involved in Research and Development under the auspices of the USSR Academy of Pedagogy. Activity games are distinguished from the earlier action games by being open, i.e. based on flexible scenarios rather than pre-conceived solutions.

== Early examples ==
The first OAG was held in 1979. One of the first games was the Ural Region Game which was devised to formulating a plan as regards how best to achieve the target set forth in the state production plan. By 1987 50 large and more than 100 small games had been conducted.

== Post Soviet OAGs ==
OAGs were used substantially following the collapse of the Soviet Union.

=== Use by non-governmental organisations ===
Non governmental organisations (NGOs) emerged in Russia in the mid 1990s and provided the context for the application of OAGs. The International Research & Exchanges Board and the Feminist Orientation Center jointly organised some activity games in 1994-5. These were funded by the Eurasia Foundation and took place in Tomsk, Chelyabinsk, Yekaterinburg and Vladivostok. There were also two sessions in Moscow at the beginning and the end of the project. There were over 150 participants drawn from over 80 NGOs.

== See also ==
- 6-3-5 Brainwriting
- Eureka effect
- Homo Ludens
