= Overburdened with Evil =

Novel by Arkady and Boris Strugatsky

- Author: Arkady and Boris Strugatsky
- Original title: Отягощённые злом
- Language: Russian
- Genre: Philosophical novel
- Publisher: Moskovsky Rabochiy
- Publication date: 1988 (serial), 1989 (book)

Overburdened with Evil (Russian: Отягощённые злом) is a philosophical novel by Arkady and Boris Strugatsky, written in 1986–1988, the last major work of the co-authors. It was first published in the magazine Yunost (issues 6–7 for 1988), and in 1989 it was included in the second volume of Selected Works by the publisher Moskovsky Rabochiy. The first separate book edition with illustrations by Yana Ashmarina and an afterword by Sergey Pereslegin was published by the commercial publisher Prometheus. After 1989, the novel was constantly included in all collected works of the Strugatskys. It has been translated into English, Bulgarian, German, and Polish.

The plot is constructed on the principle of a novel within a novel; both plot lines are presented through the perception of the main characters, who exist in many plot and space-time layers. The manuscript OZ, whose formal author is the astronomer Sergei Manokhin, tells of the coming to the late 1980s Soviet Union of the Demiurge, concerned about the fate of the world he created. He is served by the cunning Agasfer Lukich and some other authors of world salvation projects, whom the Demiurge keeps with him. Finally, it is Ahasuerus (in Overburdened with Evil he is also the immortal apostle John the Evangelist, a collector of human souls who was also at the origins of Islam under the name Rakhkhal) who brings to the Demiurge the Man with a capital M — Georgy Anatolyevich Nosov. In the second plot line, events are presented from the diary of G. A. Nosov's student — Igor Mytarin. Nosov is a great pedagogue, practitioner, and theorist who heads a lyceum in the city of Tashlinsk in the first third of the 21st century. Unexpectedly for the city authorities and even his own students, he stands up for a subculture completely alien to everyone, the so-called Flora (in which hippies are recognized), and, defending his ideals, sacrifices himself to the enraged crowd.

The novel was published during the perestroika era and was negatively evaluated by critics, who perceived it as a creative failure: a political pamphlet or paraphrase of Mikhail Bulgakov's The Master and Margarita. 21st-century researchers emphasize the misunderstanding of the novel by contemporaries and its milestone character for the Strugatskys' work, as Overburdened with Evil is entirely devoted to utopia and pedagogy as means of saving the world, and to the relations between power and culture.

== Plot ==
Doomed by Evil is the third of the Strugatskys' works that are constructed based on the "novel within a novel" device (also Snail on the Slope and Lame Fate). The chapters alternate: these are excerpts from the diary of a student at the Tashlinsk Lyceum, Igor Mytarin (covering events from July 10 to 21), and chapters from the manuscript OZ, which the teacher G. A. Nosov gave to Igor. Inside the OZ manuscript are chapters about the Demiurge and his assistants (the events in these chapters are presented from the perspective of the astronomer Sergei Manokhin), as well as a peculiarly interpreted Gospel plot and the adventures of Ahasuerus in the first century of Islam. The main leitmotif of the novel is the distortion and unreliability of history: "It wasn't like that at all, not like that at all".

=== Manuscript OZ ===
At the end of the 1980s, in an apartment in one of the Soviet panel blocks, the Demiurge materialized, served by the sardonic sophist Ahasuerus Lukich Prudkov as an insurance agent (in appearance, he resembles Yevgeny Leonov). The "insurance agent" addresses the Demiurge by the names of all humanity's gods — Yahweh, Ptah, Khnum, Ilmarinen, the Weaver and the Potter, and others. (Note: The enumeration of names is borrowed from the article by Eleazar Meletinsky "Demiurge" from the encyclopedic dictionary Myths of the Peoples of the World.) The Demiurge is a somewhat eerie creature who is compared to Woland: with greenish skin, black hands that have more joints on the fingers and elbows than a human should have, a nose disfigured by disease, a brow without eyebrows, and eyes speckled with bloody streaks on the whites. His eyes always burned with one expression: "furious frenzied onslaught mixed with disgust". As it turns out later, Ahasuerus was in ancient times the apostle John the Evangelist, who became the Eternal Jew, and the Quranic Rahhal, a companion of Musaylima and the lover of the prophetess Sajah of Mesopotamia. Christomorphic The Demiurge receives the persons he needs at his place, fulfilling their cherished dreams, for which they pay with service. The role of secretary to the Demiurge is played by the astronomer Sergei Korneevich Manokhin, who once made a mistake in his scientific work and begged to change the laws of the universe so that the astrophysical effect he invented would manifest in reality. He is in constant bewilderment, for he has fallen into the service of "some global experimenters embroidering satin stitch on all of humanity," but he is not sure of their dark nature. Manokhin secretly writes memoirs, narrating the affairs of the Demiurge and Ahasuerus. Over time, the Demiurge begins to summon people from the present, the past (including Judas), and the future to his apartment, wanting to learn their recipes for correcting humanity. Mostly, he encounters ideologues, politicians, and military men; the Demiurge is deeply dissatisfied and grumbles that "they're all surgeons or bonesetters. There's not a single therapist among them!" Such are the dry pedant Pyotr Petrovich Kolpakov, the neofascist Marek Parasyukhin, and the caricatured Jew Matvey Matveyevich Gershkovich (Mordechai Mordekhaevich Gershenzon). Sometimes, relatively harmless romantics in construction brigade jackets come across, but their thoughts are simple and easy to confuse. In the finale, Ahasuerus brings the true Man to the Demiurge — Georgy Anatolyevich. The manuscript breaks off here; it is reported that its ending was probably destroyed by G. A. Nosov himself "out of modesty".

=== Igor Mytarin's diary ===
The action unfolds forty years later in the provincial town of Tashlinsk. (Note: Critic Irina Vasyuchenko cited the year 2033, relying on the text of the 1989 edition of the novel. Boris Strugatsky counted forty years from the time of the novel's writing (1985–1987), so the second plot line unfolds in the late 2020s. The dates are taken by analogy with the titles of the novels in the Musketeers cycle by Alexandre Dumas.) Here exists an elite lyceum where people demonstrating pedagogical talent are selected and educated. The director of the lyceum, Georgy Anatolyevich Nosov, a deputy, merited teacher, member of the city council, a famous person, preaches an ethical teaching that is more Christ-like than the Demiurge's, and his students resemble the Apostles. The text is filled with Gospel allusions, and the narrative associated with the figure of G. A. Nosov is almost entirely placed in the diary of his student with the telling surname Mytarin. Nosov's task is to cultivate a pedagogical elite, turning students into educators of the world; therefore, he is the "therapist of the Demiurge." He teaches to approach one's work responsibly, moreover, he instructs not only the lyceum students in this, but also people in power; he teaches to work constantly and love people even if they are ugly, sick, and exude malice. Therefore, he sends his lyceum students to hospitals to care for the dying and assist in operations, to gain experience of "non-squeamish love." In the Teacher's view, humanity is above all rules, and his main requirements are "understanding and mercy".

Understanding is the lever, tool, instrument that the teacher uses in his work.

Mercy is the teacher's ethical position in relation to the object of his work, a way of perception.

Where there is mercy,—there is education. Where there is no mercy or everything except mercy,— its training.

Through mercy, the Man's education occurs.

In its absence, the production of semi-finished products occurs: engineer, worker.

In the production of semi-finished products, humanity has undoubtedly succeeded. Is it easier? Or has there never been enough time for the Man's education? Or resources?

No, apparently, there was simply no need.

Nosov's ethical teaching became the subject of heated debates: G. A. defends a strange cluster of youth—the so-called Flora. Its participants —"flowers"— gather together, lead a vegetative lifestyle, speak in "woody" jargon understandable only to their subculture, like hippies, consume alcohol, drugs, and practice promiscuous relations. They have rejected the world around them, full, in their opinion, of lies, greed, and coercion. Flora has an ideologue —" nusi"— preaching only one law: "do not interfere" ("If you don't feel like doing it, do nothing"). Nosov does everything possible to fend off Flora from attacks by Komsomol members, city authorities, and the education department, for he seeks to instill in people a thirst for understanding. In the finale, Nosov, accompanied by a few students, arrives at the Flora camp when the dust from the column of townspeople marching to disperse the informals is already visible on the horizon.

== Creation and publication ==
Boris Strugatsky wrote in Comments on the Past:

This was the last novel ABS, the most complex, even perhaps overcomplicated, the most unusual, and probably the least popular of all. The authors themselves, however, considered it one of the best—too many emotional efforts, reflections, disputes, and most cherished ideas had been invested in it to feel otherwise. Here is the favorite, long-cherished idea of the Teacher with a capital T—for the first time we attempted to write about this person "live" and were pleased with the attempt. Here is the long-standing, long-cherished dream of writing a historical novel—in the manner of Lion Feuchtwanger and from the position of a person who in no way wants to believe in the existence of objective and reliable historical truth ("it wasn't like that at all, not like that at all").

=== Concept's development ===
The initial concept arose in the autumn of 1981, when Arkady Strugatsky, working on the story Details of the Life of Nikita Vorontsov, sought consultations from Arkady Weiner. Then the co-authors came up with the idea "to write a joint science fiction detective—so to speak, 'with four heads'". The meeting of the Strugatsky brothers with the Weiner brothers took place on November 9, 1981, where the general principles of the future work were discussed. The idea was roughly as follows: a Pale Man wanders through the remote province buying up living human souls. The novel was to consist of two parts—the mystical one, which the Strugatskys were to write, and the detective-realistic one—by the Weiner brothers. In the notes on this meeting, the main characters figured: the astronomer Sergei Korneevich Manokhin (narrator) and Ahasuerus Kuzmich Prudkov (soul buyer). The setting was to be the non-existent town of Tashlinsk. However, due to Arkady Weiner's illness, the project stalled, and then the writers had other matters. In 1982–1983, the Strugatskys periodically returned to the concept under the tentative title Chichikov, 20th Century, and on November 4, 1983, Arkady Strugatsky discussed this project with Georgy Weiner. In the end, negotiations with the Weiners proved unproductive, and attempts at co-authorship finally ceased.

In January 1985, the co-authors were engaged in revising the novel Lame Fate, incorporating the novel Ugly Swans into the text. In the work diary of those days, the idea of destroying the fear of death appeared, which was substantively discussed on February 15, 1985, and it became clear then that the story of the soul buyer Ahasuerus fit well into the new concept. However, further work stalled until late autumn. In Boris Strugatsky's diaries, the "story of the new Christ" and a hero taken as a secretary-translator to prepare for the Last Judgment in exchange for fulfilling a wish—the change of the laws of nature—appear. The basic idea was defined at the December meeting of 1985 in Moscow.

Our Jesus-Demiurge is not at all like the One who accepted death on the cross in ancient Jerusalem—two thousand years have passed, hundreds of worlds have been traversed by Him, hundreds of thousands of good deeds have been accomplished, and millions of events have occurred, each leaving—its own scar. He had to endure everything, incidents more terrible than the primitive crucifixion happened to Him—He became terrible and ugly. He became unrecognizable. The circumstance that misleads many readers: some are indignant, taking our Demiurge for an unsuccessful copy of Bulgakov's Woland, others—simply and straightforwardly—accuse the authors of preaching Satanism, whereas our Demiurge is actually—simply Jesus Christ two thousand years later. Truly: "He came to His own, and His own did not receive Him".

=== Writing process ===
External images
- Illustrations for the novel "Doomed by Evil"
- Artist: Yan Stanislavovna Ashmarina (1963–2015)
- Artist: Igor Borisovich Shaganov (b. 1963)

Work on the Overburdened with Evil draft began on January 25, 1986. However, if usually the co-author brothers worked according to a detailed plan, this time they not only did not have an ending, but did not always even imagine what would happen in the next chapters. Already on January 30, the writing session was interrupted "for reflection". In the work notes of A. N. Strugatsky from this period, Christological and eschatological materials appear, although he himself directly noted in his diary that "the Apocalypse is a stale idea". On April 10, in Arkady Strugatsky's diary, the co-authors' decision to write in episodes, without worrying about the plot, was recorded, which immediately moved the work forward. The chapter about Manokhin's visit to the World of Dreams of his colleague in serving the Demiurge—Matvey Matveyevich Gershkovich—was written. On May 9, in the plot notes, a new plot branch appeared—the immortal John-Ahasuerus wanders through Arabia and finds himself at the origins of Islam. The May meeting of the brothers did not take place, and the work stopped almost until the end of the year. However, while on summer vacation in the Baltic, Arkady Strugatsky tried to develop plot ideas that were very far from those realized in the final text. In August 1986, A. N. Strugatsky tried to develop the novel biography of John-Ahasuerus, abandoned the idea of linking him to Manichaeism, and began developing the Islamic plot. In August, he made extracts from the monograph by Evgeny Belyaev Arabs, Islam and the Arab Caliphate in the Early Middle Ages; a reference to the article by academician Vasily Vladimirovich Barthold Museilima also appeared. These extracts feature the prophetess Sajah of Mesopotamia and the story of her love with Museilima, with all the scabrous details in the assessments of contemporaries borrowed from Belyaev's monograph. In December 1986, the co-authors roughly completed the entire story of John's life on Patmos and the everyday chapter about the life of the Demiurge's retinue in his bizarre apartment. From the beginning of 1987, the development of material for the Arab chapters continued.

In February 1987, a creative crisis emerged again: a convincing ending for the novel —the notes of Manokhin— did not come together. The co-authors decided to introduce a parallel plot line of a character who would shake the Demiurge's negative assessment of the world and its prospects. On February 21, the chapter about the love of Rahhal-John (he replaced Museilima) and Sajah was finished, and at the same time, in the work diary, the Teacher preaching the rights of people living for their own pleasure and not bothering anyone appeared. This plot line received the title Forty Years Later. During the creative meeting in Repino in March 1987, the co-authors developed the concept over three days, including figuring out which episodes of OZ are connected to the parallel narrative. The allusion "G. A. Nosov—Ha-Nozri" did not form immediately; the teacher changed his name several times. The author of the diary ("Anti-Judas, Nosov's faithful disciple") was first mentioned as Lev Matveev, but this reference to the evangelists and Bulgakov seemed too straightforward. By the time the draft of the second part began, he became Igor Mytarin — publicans (that is, tax collectors) were the author of one of the Gospels and, accordingly, a character in the Master and Margarita. On March 19, the Strugatskys wrote the introduction "Necessary Explanations". On April 1, it was finally decided that the part from Mytarin's perspective should be presented in the form of diary entries. The detailed plan of the entire novel was completed by the authors on May 20. All the remaining work on Mytarin's diary was completed on October 24, 1987. The draft of the unfinished part from Manokhin's perspective is dated November 22.

The novel's manuscripts have been preserved. Manokhin's notes are 113 pages without a title page, title, epigraphs, or completion date. Each page features numerous multi-stage corrections in pencil and pen directly on the typescript, with the reverse side of pages sometimes fully written over. The arrangement of chapters differed from the final text, and chapter numbers and headings were absent. The draft of Igor Mytarin's diary was a separate manuscript of 69 pages, with the last page indicating: "24.10.87. Repino". The editing of this version was no less intensive. Having completed both drafts, the Strugatskys proceeded to assemble the text for the fair copy. The scheme for linking episodes ("packaging" in Arkady Strugatsky's terminology) is dated November 23, 1987. Work on the clean copy began on December 18 and proceeded in two stages until January 1988. The author's fair copy of 205 pages is dated January 18, 1988. It exists in two copies, differing in corrections.

=== Publication ===
By 1988, offers from publishing houses and magazine editorial offices for the Strugatskys far exceeded demand. The co-authors chose the magazine Yunost for the first publication. In the March diary, it is noted that the text was accepted "very well", with the start of publication planned for June or July over five issues. The editor, without notifying the authors, made numerous minor edits to the text, replacing or crossing out individual words, which even led Arkady Strugatsky to write on April 5 a demand for author control over the form in which the novel would go to print. An announcement of Overburdened with Evil followed in No. 3 of the magazine Soviet Bibliography, in which two chapters were printed—the conversation between the Demiurge and Ahasuerus Lukich and Manokhin's meeting with Parasyukhin. The full text in Yunost was published in a three-million print run in two issues—the sixth and the seventh — that is, the period from the completion of the manuscript to publication took half a year. In the magazine text, there were two significant differences from the manuscript: due to the Sumgait pogrom, the central press tried to hush up the Armenian-Azerbaijani conflict, so in Yunost the calls by Marek Parasyukhin for the "final solution to the Armenian question" were removed (this fragment was not censored in Soviet Bibliography). Secondly, the authors erred in attributing the formula "I believe precisely because it is absurd" to the blessed Augustine, and the inaccuracy was discovered when the sixth issue of the magazine had already gone to the printing house. Therefore, in the next issue, an addition was made to Mytarin's concluding comments on the OZ manuscript, which was not reproduced later.

The first book edition followed in the two-volume "Selected Works" of 1989, published by the Moskovsky Rabochiy publishing house. This same version of the novel was included in the tenth volume of the "white" collected works of the Tekst publishing house in 1994 and was reproduced in collected works of 1996–1998. The variant published in the Worlds of the Strugatsky Brothers" series was poorly proofread. Only in preparing the collected works of the Stalker publishing house in 2001 was work carried out to restore the text from the "Worlds" version—in particular, the inconsistency in Mytarin's name and patronymic and initials was eliminated: in the magazine publication and some book editions, he was named "Igor K.", whereas his patronymic, mentioned in the text, was "Vsevolodovich". The full version of the novel based on the author's manuscript and with some corrections by B. N. Strugatsky was printed in the 28th volume of the complete collected works of the Strugatskys by the "Luden" group in 2020.

== Literary features ==
The novel is preceded by two epigraphs. The first is attributed to a certain "schismatic Trifilius", who allegedly burned himself in 1701: "Out of ten, nine do not know the difference between darkness and light, truth and lies, honor and dishonor, freedom and slavery. Nor do they know their own benefit". The historicity of Trifilius's existence is unknown, but the phrase itself is constructed on the model of the Tale of Avraamy Palitsyn on the Siege of the Trinity-Sergius Monastery (chapter "On the Reply Letter to the Poles and All Traitors"). The second epigraph is from the Gospel of John (John 18:10): "Then Simon Peter, having a sword, drew it and struck the high priest's slave, and cut off his right ear. The slave's name was Malchus". According to the version presented in the novel, the ear was not cut off from Malchus, but from John-Ahasuerus. According to the authors' concept, this motif is intended to testify that any historical truth is debatable.

=== Chronotope ===
American researcher Yvonne Howell asserted that the action of both plot lines of the novel takes place in Tashlinsk, offering a symbolic interpretation of this name. The fictional city can be understood as a combination of Tashkent and Minsk, that is, as a symbolic microcosm of the Soviet Union, from north to south and from east to west. The action of the main part of the OZ manuscript relates to the conditional "our" time, presented in Igor Mytarin's diary as a historical document separated from the time of G. A. Nosov's life by forty years.

In I. V. Neronova's dissertation, at least six spatio-temporal layers are identified in which the action takes place. The calculation of dates is based on mentions in the 2001 edition of the novel.

1. 33 – the story of the death of the Nazarene.
2. 73–96 – the transformation of John into Ahasuerus, the story of the creation of the Apocalypse.
3. 633 – the story of Rahhal, Mujja ibn-Murara, and Sajah.
4. 1993 – the arrival of the Demiurge.
5. 2033 – the story of G. A. Nosov and Flora.
6. 2073 – Igor Mytarin's commentary.

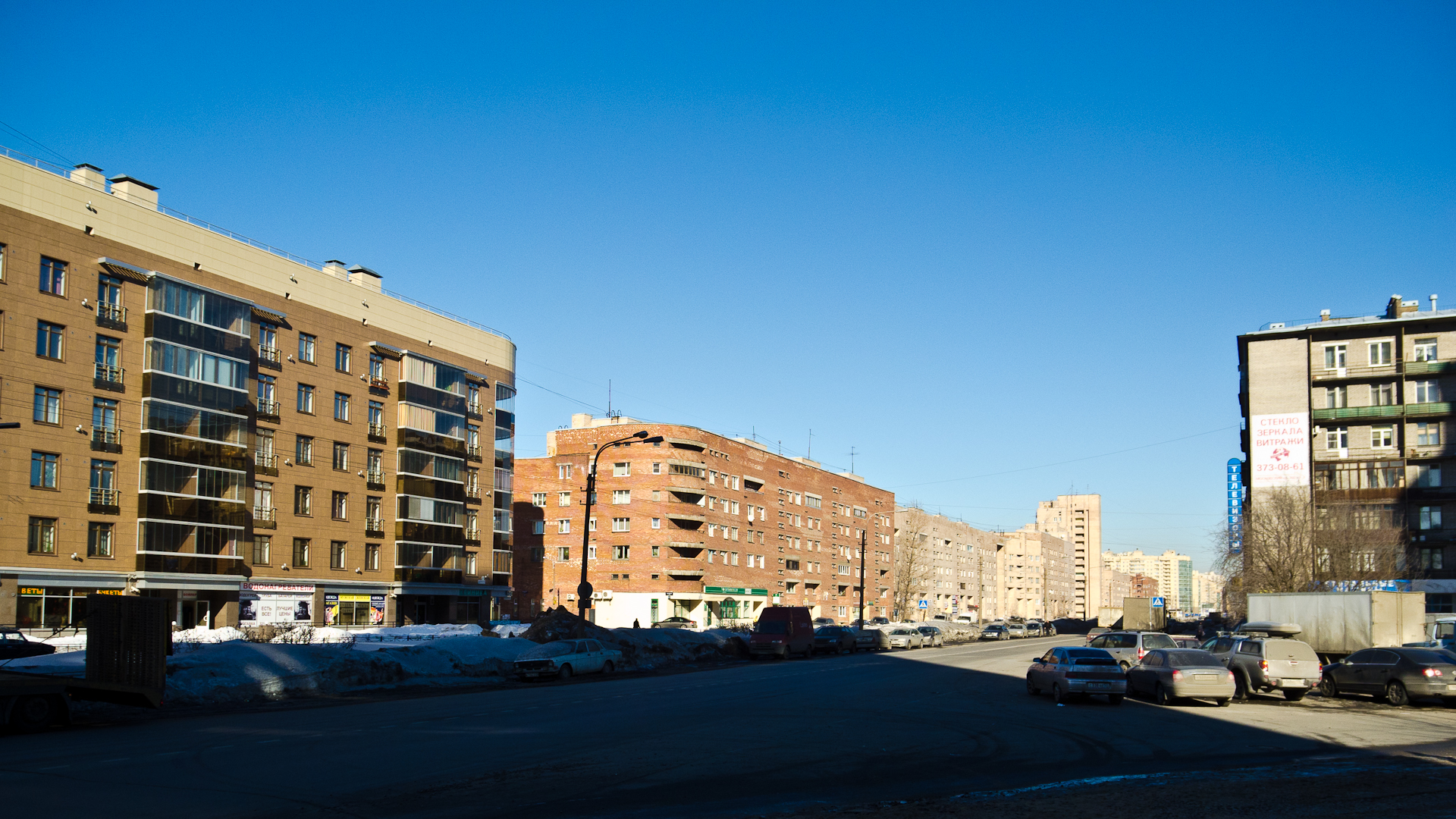
Warsaw Street in Petersburg at the intersection with Victory Street. The red house in the center is the prototype of the Demiurge's dwelling; in the house opposite (Victory Street, No. 4), B. N. Strugatsky lived. Photo from 2011

By the will of the co-authors, the Demiurge settled in a real-life residential complex located on Warsaw Street in Petersburg (architects V. N. Shcherbin, M. V. Sarri, Yu. M. Pesotsky), construction of which was carried out in 1984–1986. Opposite was the house where Boris Strugatsky lived from 1964. "The roof was flat, as if intended for landing future airships, the facade was decorated with recesses and bends of complex shapes, rectangular tunnels hung over very high arches,—and for what purposes, one wonders, did they cut the facade with narrow niches up to the fifth floor? Surely for incredibly long and thin statues of some heroes or sufferers of the past? And why did the architect need to erect completely fortress-like towers on the ends of the amazing house, semicircular and of different heights?" On the twelfth, last floor of the southern end tower, in the thirteenth entrance, was located a "three-room by design" apartment without designation, but logically it should have No. 527.

The time in the Demiurge's plot line cannot be unambiguously characterized as either linear or cyclical, since nothing is completed and nothing arises in the apartment. From the moment Manokhin appears, it is constantly snowing with rain outside the window, and the same day—November 16—continues eternally; only when Ahasuerus Lukich brings the intrigued G. A. Nosov does November immediately change to the date July 17. In each new chapter of the OZ manuscript, new visitor-projectors appear, but their turnover does not lead to qualitative changes. Apartment No. 527 lacks the properties of a home as a place of protection or shelter (which is confirmed by the absence of a number on the door); Manokhin perceives it as a hostile space. The fantastical reality is alien to the hero, becoming the cause of his loneliness and disappointment. The door to the Demiurge's office is always wide open, but behind it is cosmic darkness in which "whitish lights reluctantly flare up and immediately go out." In a certain sense, parallels can be drawn between the Demiurge's abode and Bulgakov's "bad apartment", but there are far more differences. For example, the house stands empty after being handed over under key, while the initially three-room apartment accommodates a huge gallery of bright but egoistic characters whose psychology knows no mercy.

The objective world of Overburdened with Evil, as usual with the Strugatskys, constructs the scene of action and emphasizes the strangeness and illogic of the events described by Manokhin. For example, the items from the Reception Room are listed in the greatest detail (over three pages). They are completely ordinary in themselves, but create strange combinations or acquire frightening properties: for example, the number of televisions constantly changes, they turn on and off of their own will and choose their own programs. Accordingly, the characters who have settled with the Demiurge are characterized through their attitude to things. The pretender to the position of the Beast from the Sea, Kolpakov, is ascetic, while the advocate for the fate of Great Russia and follower of "Saint Adolf", Marek Parasyukhin, is a lover of luxury and excesses. In contrast, in Mytarin's diary, the mentioned objects mainly serve to create an image of the future: some "synchro-lightings", "funkies" stuck in the ears (something like wireless headphones), the character of the popular cartoon Thermocrator, and Manokhin's manuscript Igor calls "the diary of some Drevlian". Even more alien is Flora with all the attributes of a subculture: ""roots",—huge downy bast shoes painted green". Mytarin sees first and foremost the dirty and unattractive side of Flora, contrasting with the truly paradisiacal corner of nature where its camp is located, and the ordered world of socialist Tashlinsk.

=== Artistic world of the novel ===
==== Narrative strategy ====
The text of Overburdened with Evil is organized on the principle of a "novel within a novel", in which Igor Mytarin's diary represents the natural world corresponding to reality in social, psychological, physical, and other aspects. The diary text is multilayered, as it is provided with a foreword and afterword written forty years after the described events, and the diary text itself contains explanations. The text emphasizes the non-identity of the "funny, touching, sometimes pathetic youth" of the diary entries and the publisher-narrator. The semantic areas are divided by internal content as well: if at the beginning of the 21st century Nosov's ideas are not shared by society, then forty years later "the name of Georgy Anatolyevich Nosov emerged from non-being, and not just emerged, but seemed to explode suddenly, becoming in an instant hardly the first in the list of bearers of the ideas of our century."

The duality of the novel-within-a-novel corresponds to the alternation of retrospective and synchronic points of view of the narrator. (Note: Mark Amusin asserted that the novel Overburdened with Evil has at least three plot levels, highlighting Ahasuerus Lukich's stories separately as "tracing the mechanics of the emergence of legend", based on maximum approximation to the realities of that time.) Igor Mytarin in his comments, "Necessary Foreword", and "Necessary Conclusion" takes an external retrospective position in relation to the described events, while possessing a great accumulated knowledge. The latter (as in the novel Waves Extinguish the Wind) serves to certify the information provided by the narrator. It is generally impossible to establish the narrator of the inner part of the OZ manuscript novel: either Manokhin retells Ahasuerus Lukich's stories, or Ahasuerus Lukich narrates himself, or another narrator intervenes who is not a character in the described world. The only direct indication of Ahasuerus Lukich is the story of the love of Rahhal and Sajah, which is presented in the third person. The very beginning of the "Manuscript", in the scene of the conversation between the just-appeared Demiurge and Ahasuerus Lukich, also comes from an indefinite narrator. The literariness of the text contradicts the title "Manuscript", with its intimacy of narration, usually oriented toward a conversational style. Although Manokhin is the formal author of the manuscript, the introductory scene does not belong to him: he usually reports only what he witnessed personally, and there are no other characters near the Demiurge and Ahasuerus Lukich.

Ural researcher N. G. Severova proposed a hypothesis that the metasubject of the novel is the struggle of different ideas about the "correct" way of living life, and on the level of the metasubject, two principles act: the excessive and the exceptional. The excessive is understood as the need to remake the world by violent means according to one's own ideas about it. The excessive principle can be corrected only by an exceptional personality, a hero capable through mercy of correcting the egoistic natural principle.

The most important leitmotifs of the novel are distortion and misunderstanding. The motif of distortion is introduced through an anecdote about Stalin's Russia: when Comrade Stalin was shown the just-completed film The Unforgettable Year 1919, the leader, bringing all those present into awe with long silence, without looking at anyone, pronounced emphatically: "Nэ tak vso eto bylo. Savsem nэ tak". "The film, however, went through the country's screens with the usual success and received all the due awards." Biblical and Islamic plots in the OZ manuscript are also introduced by a separate (ninth) chapter consisting of one phrase: "So: it wasn't like that at all, not like that at all." The presentation from the positions of Ahasuerus Lukich and Judas reveals that the events in the Gospels are told "not at all like that". The history of the creation of the Apocalypse is incredibly distorted: Prochorus, John's "disciple" who followed his teacher into exile, records his "revelations" (which were actually stories about the world of the future). However, he turned out to be a great writer and a born myth-maker: "His imagination was excellently developed, and he filled all the gaping holes in the prophet's stories and explanations according to his own understanding with pleasure and without any hesitation. Further. Prochorus was initially convinced that he had before him a real prophet in the flesh. John-Ahasuerus shared knowledge, Prochorus recorded prophecies." At the very beginning of the novel, Mytarin also admits that he never understood the course and thoughts and actions of his teacher G. A. Nosov. For example, the significance of the Manuscript passed to him by the teacher remains a mystery to him. Other students of Nosov also understand nothing. On all levels of the narrative, the motif of betrayal appears: the apostles (including John) betray the Nazarene, Mujja ibn-Murara betrays his ruler and prophet Musaylima, lyceum student Askol'd betrays G. A. Nosov, unwilling to follow him to defend Flora.

==== Ethical dead ends of Mytarin's diary ====
The characters acting in Mytarin's diary are organized around the basic conflict surrounding the Flora subculture. Flora is deindividualized, represented by the figure of "nusi" (the chief ideologue and son of G. A. Nosov) and an ordinary "bush" (slang designation) who brought bad news. Georgy Anatolyevich categorically states that teenagers and young people "are not running to Flora, they are forming Flora. In general, they are running not 'where to', but 'from where'. They are running from us, from our world they are running to their own world, which they create as best they can and with their abilities. This world is not like ours and cannot be like it, because it is created contrary to ours, opposite to ours, and to the shame of ours." Flora is axiologically opposed to 21st-century Tashlinsk: if for Soviet people the main value is labor and a worthy life, then for flowers material values are of no interest. Nusi, preaching non-interference, says: "The more you want, the more you interfere with others, which means with Flora, which means with yourself." The surrounding people perceive flowers as dirty drug addicts corrupting the city's youth; it is not surprising that Igor, visiting the "camp", notes with surprise in his diary that "for the most part I saw young glorious faces—no pathology, no boils, trachoma and other scabies about which flower-haters talk so much, and, of course, they are all different, as they should be." "Flower-haters" are the authorities: the mayor, the police chief, the city education department instructor, and the head of the city education department herself, Reveca Samoilovna Ginsblit (Gontar' in some editions)—and even Nosov's student Askol'd. Apparently, only Nosov understands that the future embodied by Flora is frightening because it is "not what it should be." Mytarin is surprised that the teacher does not consider flowers fallen and does not divide social phenomena into "bad" and "good" at all. The reason is that the teacher sees not further, but deeper than those around him: the action against Flora distorts the souls of the townspeople themselves. "...They will present the most shameful page of their lives to themselves as the most heroic, and thus mutilate their psyche for the rest of their lives." The epigraph from the Gospel sets the theme of mercy, when Jesus said to Peter: "Put your sword into its sheath...". Nosov tells Reveca that the humanity she professes consists of nothing but principles, "all arranged on shelves, there is no humanity left in you—pure catechism." True humanity is above any principles, including principles derived from humanity itself.

The epigraph also sets Gospel parallels: G. A. Nosov ("Ha-Nozri") turns out to be a projection of the First Teacher—Jesus Christ, as are his lyceum students-apostles. The lyceum students are not at all convinced of Georgy Anatolyevich's righteousness and argue furiously whether he is right or not. In this regard (as Vadim Kazakov also noted), the declarations of Tashlinsk's "city fathers" repeat the actions and words of the authorities from Ugly Swans: objectively contributing to the construction of the future, they are categorically not ready for its "cruel miracles".

==== Multidimensionality of Manokhin's manuscript ====
The artistic space of the OZ manuscript is mythological or, more precisely, neomythological. This is emphasized by the strange grotesque setting of the whimsical house and even the descriptions of the appearance of the Demiurge and Ahasuerus Lukich. The Demiurge is free to change at his discretion the spatial, temporal characteristics of reality, human properties, and continues to create worlds during the narrative. For example, at the request of Mordechai Mordekhaevich, he created an experimental world in which a certain "thunderbolt" punishes ethics violators with an electric discharge, and in which Manokhin himself ended up extremely unsuccessfully, going to the store at the wrong time. The Demiurge's problem is that he is limitedly omnipotent, which Ahasuerus Lukich explains: "When you can do everything, but somehow, somehow, somehow cannot create obverse without reverse and right without left... When everything you can do, and may, and create good—is burdened with evil?"

The characters grouped around the Demiurge's apartment are invariably connected with the astronomer-narrator Manokhin. First of all, these are the Demiurge and Ahasuerus themselves, who took him into service—omnipotent beings, clearly "not of this world", endowed with different supernatural qualities and abilities. Secondly, these are social projectors whose variants of saving humanity the Demiurge became interested in for one reason or another, leaves them with him, and even creates "experimental worlds" according to their requests. Directly in the OZ chapters act Marek Parasyukhin, Gershenzon-Gershkovich, the pedant Kolpakov, as well as only mentioned in the characters' speeches "indescribable Selena the Good" and the policeman Spiritov-Vodkin. (Note: At least three inhabitants of the Demiurge's apartment bear the names of apostles and evangelists: Peter Kolpakov, Matthew Gershkovich, Mark Parasyukhin, placed in a deliberately lowered context.) The third group consists of only G. A. Nosov, the true Man with a capital M, the "great therapist" the Demiurge is looking for. The fourth group consists of visitors to the Demiurge and Ahasuerus, with the greatest attention paid to Judas and Mujja ibn-Murara. A special role in the OZ narrative is played by plots and characters of the second level associated with the history of John-Ahasuerus. Ahasuerus Lukich is immortal and omniscient, and it is from his stories that the events of the emergence of the world's greatest religions emerge—Christianity in the Roman Empire of the 1st century and Islam in 7th-century Arabia. Ahasuerus's favorite hobby is collecting human souls, which he sometimes simply buys. Two thousand years ago, the Demiurge was a modest Rabbi full of love and forgiveness, and Ahasuerus was the riotous robber John. Later, when John unwillingly gained immortality, he swapped personalities with his disciple Prochorus, who wrote the Apocalypse. In Arabia, already after the death of the Prophet, John-Ahasuerus-Rahhal finds himself connected with Mujja-ibn-Murara, who ruined the beautiful and passionate Sajah, whose love he is unable to forget after many centuries.

The spaces of Mytarin's diary and the OZ manuscript are mutually permeable. The Demiurge is capable of expanding and distorting the laws of space and time, so other characters are simply carried into the hallway. In an unknown way, in the middle of the night, Mujja ibn-Murara appears in the hallway, giving rise to the "Arab" story. Ahasuerus Lukich himself ends up in Tashlinsk twice and finally brings G. A. Nosov to the Demiurge's Reception Room. The characters constantly double: in Mytarin's diary, there turn out to be two teachers — besides G. A. himself, his son-"nusi". In Manokhin's manuscript, he personally communicates with the Demiurge, who is simultaneously the Rabbi of John-Ahasuerus's memories. Traitors turned out to be Judas and Peter, as well as Mujja, who ruined Musaylima and Sajah. Traitors in the 21st century turned out to be almost all the inhabitants of Tashlinsk—almost the entire city were his students or students of students. The closest and most beloved turned out to be John and Igor Mytarin, but even they were unable to understand the teacher.

=== Novel-apocrypha and its pretexts ===
==== Strugatskys, Soviet literature, and religion ====
Critic Viktor Toporov asserted the fundamental "Sovietness" of the Strugatsky brothers' work, who managed to "delegate" science fiction to great literature. For Soviet writers, the self-sufficient atheism of the communist ideal was fundamentally important, and the attempt to escape from it in Overburdened with Evil was purely speculative in nature. Philologist Ekaterina Surovtseva (Moscow State University) also noted that the novel Overburdened with Evil is written from purely atheistic positions and considers Christ only as a teacher of morality; the novel's text contains direct anti-Christian statements. Science fiction writer Sergei Lukyanenko in the pages of the magazine Foma specifically raised the question of believers' attitude to the Strugatskys and the Strugatskys' attitude to issues of faith. (Note: Boris Strugatsky in an offline interview (remark on September 22, 1998) directly stated that for him and his brother, Jesus was "a remarkable man and bearer of a great idea, to give which to humanity was his number one task—for this one could go to the cross if it doesn't work otherwise." In responses on March 8, 2003, B. N. Strugatsky clarified that the brothers received no feedback from official church institutions on the novel, and there were no positive responses from believers. Negative letters, "literally exuding hatred," were often illiterate.) According to Lukyanenko, "the Strugatskys persistently remained silent about God. Yes, they were atheists—not militant, of course, but they confidently put God in brackets. In the world of their books, there is no God, and moreover—He would look strange there." In this regard, "Doomed by Evil, or Forty Years Later" stands out in their work, but even here the religious material turns out to be "not even a background, but the subject of conversation".

Tatyana Rybalchenko (Tomsk State University) considered the Strugatskys' novel in the broad literary context of "hidden" late Soviet literature, whose works became available to readers almost simultaneously in 1986–1989: B. L. Pasternak Doctor Zhivago (1956, published in 1988), Y. O. Dombrovsky The Faculty of Useless Knowledge (1975, published in 1988), F. N. Gorenstein Psalm (1975, published in 1986), V. F. Tendryakov Assault on Mirages (1982, published in 1989), Ch. T. Aitmatov The Place of the Skull (first publication in 1986 in the magazine Novy Mir No. 6, 8, 9), A. Kim "Father-Forest" (1989). These novels are united not only by the method of cognizing modernity through the projection of biblical plots, but also by the secular-atheistic nature of the comprehension of religious plots: all the listed works reflect the Renanian tradition of perceiving Gospel events and characters as historical, which developed in Russian literature at the end of the 19th – beginning of the 20th centuries. The strongest influence on the writers of the late USSR was exerted by Bulgakov's novel "The Master and Margarita". If in "Doctor Zhivago" the principle of allusive overlay of the Gospel subtext on the collisions of modern history was applied, then Bulgakov applied the contamination of biblical plots with plots of modernity. Gospel plots are not reduced to inserted plots: in Overburdened with Evil, motifs and characters of Scripture violate realistic plot determinism. In the same context, political scientist Alexander Neklessa stated the presence in the Strugatskys of an atheistic metaphysics, postulating not the immortality of the soul, but the triumph of spirit over nature and the eternal youth of the world. In literary expression, this results in magical realism. Knowledge ceases to be a means of cognizing truth, turning into a technology oriented toward power: "knowledge is power", "cognition as power", "teacher as priest", "scientist as demiurge"—the credo of the Noon World, characteristic of the spirit of Russian cosmism. Manokhin, having negotiated with the Demiurge to make changes to the structure of the universe, carries out precisely a practical act of using omnipotence: if nature could be arranged exactly as the astronomer wrote about it, why not bring it into line with the theory if there is desire and appropriate opportunities.

The Strugatskys' Demiurge does not resemble Renan's human Christ. In the depiction of Arkady and Boris Natanovich, this is a disillusioned Cosmocrat, possessing superhuman capabilities, but doubting the world created by higher power and people, and becoming closer to Lucifer in terms of skepticism toward divine creation. His appearance on Earth is not the Last Judgment: the creator wanted to find the perfect man, but in vain. Ideals and projects run into the mismatch of intention and its embodiment, which destroys any utopian projects. The explanation of the Demiurge's despair is given by his assistant-trickster Ahasuerus Lukich. The Savior and Teacher-Rabbi in the novel has become a Demiurge aware of the imperfection of his creation and himself. He does not punish the people who come to him, but debunks their cherished dreams, as a result of which people, losing illusions, lose the meaning of existence. The revelations of omniscience obtained by John-Ahasuerus were distorted by his disciple Prochorus, which means they distorted the Rabbi's teaching, returned the fear of punishment during the vengeful second coming of the Teacher. Neither illusions nor fear helped create an ideal world for people whose freedom of reason is disproportionate to being, and therefore burdened with evil.

In the situation of the novel's "modernity" in Tashlinsk, a teacher appeared whose idea of improvement is close to the ideas of Christ-Rabbi. This is G. A. Nosov—"Ha-Nozri", who realizes the imperfection of civilization: even his own son became the guru of the "flowers" subculture, children of flowers refusing to create reality. Flowers turn to the vegetative principle of life in randomness and without purpose; the spiritual justifications for refusing civilization by their guru are alien to the majority, just as Rabbi's ideas were alien to Jews. The Strugatskys themselves "evaluate the refusal from rational creation of material, social, and spiritual life as the collapse of the idea of personality, refusal from human essence—to be a rational and creating being." At the same time, the Strugatskys reject the violent return of man to the mission of creator, but demonstrate the free acquisition by personality of universal ethical consciousness. Nosov therefore suffers defeat, not understood by either society or students. The desire to bring reality closer to the ideal leads to the temptation to attract superhuman force, so Nosov appears in the Demiurge's reception room.

In Overburdened with Evil, history is interpreted in an original way. Cosmogenesis led to the appearance of chaotic matter, which is ordered by reason that inexplicably arose in the Universe. Even superhuman force in the Strugatskys is not God, but the Demiurge: according to Gnostic ideas, an ambivalent principle, the inseparability of Good and Evil. In application to human history, after the death of the Rabbi, the understanding of the impossibility of achieving absolute harmony was lost, and faith in a miraculous supernatural existence of man was consolidated, not requiring creative activity. That is, the true laws of being require pragmatic ethics justifying movement toward the absolute with awareness of its unattainability. On the contrary, over the course of centuries, faiths change, requiring the achievement of the ideal: Christianity is renewed by Islam, then the positivist ideal of inevitable creation of a second nature. This leads not to improvement, but to historical self-affirmation or refusal from creation, since flowers are still carriers of positivist consciousness, only negative, skeptical.

Philologist Nadezhda Biryuzova noted that the Strugatskys, using motifs of the Second Coming of Christ, being atheists, deprived it of the Resurrection — the culminating pledge and beginning of moral renewal of the world. Denial of the existence of God automatically means the absence of absolute values. The Strugatskys rethought and reconstructed episodes of the Second Coming as a concrete-historical form of existence. Having used mythological narrative as a ready formula, the Strugatskys used the Coming as a tool for analyzing phenomena of the surrounding world. At the same time, the writers remained in the mainstream of the classical literary tradition—affirmation of man's responsibility for his activity and the necessity of suffering and spiritual experience for awakening to light, catharsis. However, they consistently carried out the desanctification of the Christian ideal and moral-aesthetic values. From the point of view of N. Biryuzova, the novel features three Christs: the Rabbi who came to ancient Jerusalem, full of awareness of God's Will; the embittered Demiurge of the Soviet 1980s, for whom there is neither joy nor love; and the teacher of the 21st century G. A. Nosov—the creating Master. The Strugatskys consistently considered man as the receptacle of all the meanings of the world. Man's metaphysical uniqueness consists in the fact that he not only connects heaven and earth, but is also a conductor between worlds. Man's ability to dispose of the code of the Universe laid down from above determines the future fate of the world.

==== Gnosticism, Christianity, and the Eternal Jew ====
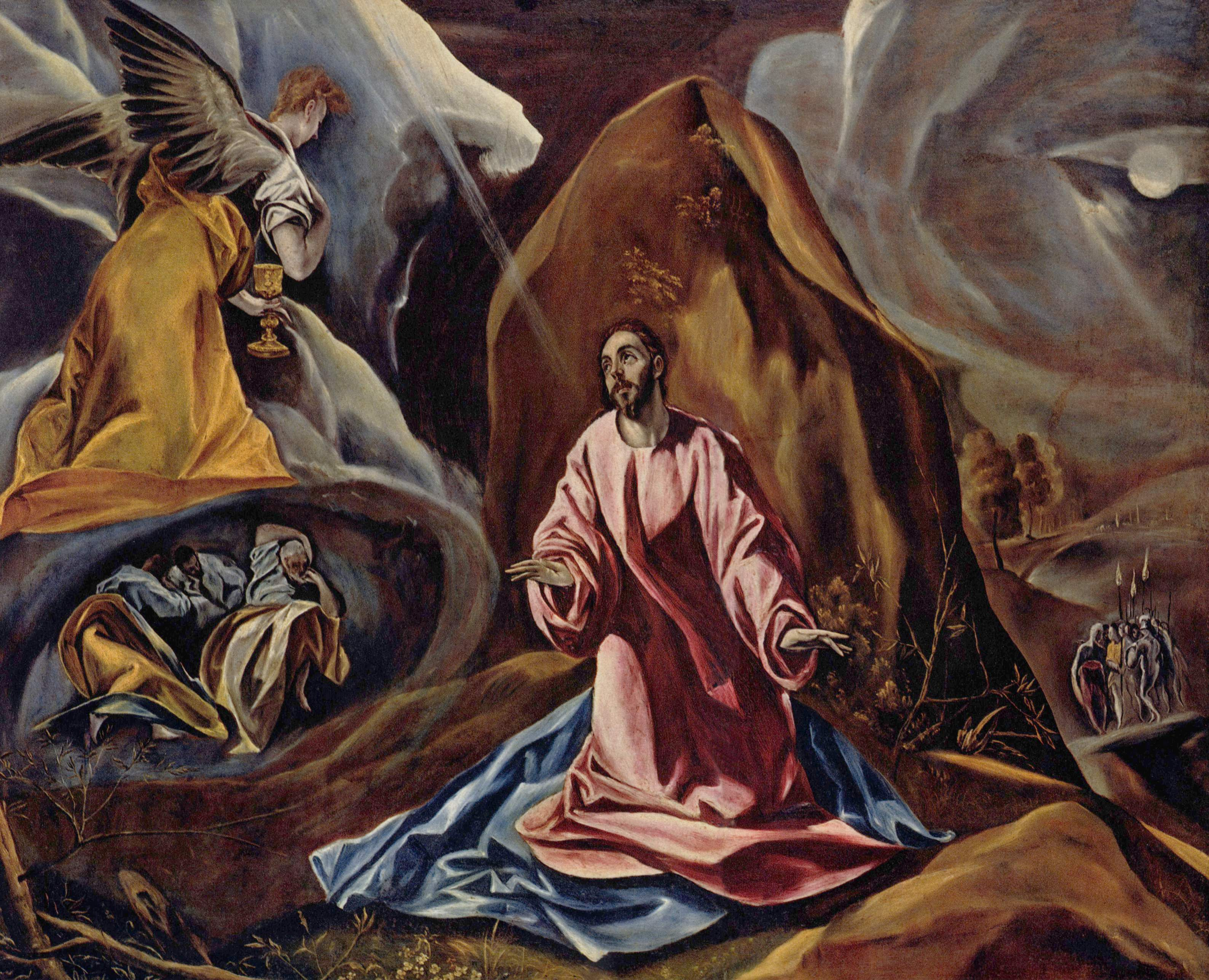
El Greco. The Agony in the Garden of Gethsemane. c. 1590, National Gallery, London

Yvonne Howell in her 1994 dissertation characterized the experiment undertaken by the Strugatskys with the inclusion of religious pretexts as extremely unusual. Despite the state atheism policy conducted for three generations, among the potential readers of Overburdened with Evil there were enough who could recognize the Gospel story and appreciate the author's play with meanings. However, the co-authors used sources and cultural blocks less familiar to readers. The researcher asserted that the key to understanding the necessity of Gospel and Islamic reminiscences was the initial scene from Mytarin's diary, in which he with G. A. first visited the Flora camp. Describing how a certain couple of flowers engaged in copulation right during the sermon of non-action, the hero-describer quotes a study by primatologist George Schaller. This is not the only reference of this kind, as the entire novel action is filled with series of allusions. One of these series is devoted to the contradiction between the materialistic (biological) and spiritual definition of man. In the OZ manuscript, this additionally gives a contrast between scientific discourse (Manokhin is an astrophysicist) and Gnosticism, on the system of images of which the story of the Demiurge and Ahasuerus is built. At the basis of all Gnostic belief systems lies the primacy of transcendent human knowledge (obtained through mystical and esoteric revelation) and the idea that evil is inherent in all matter. The Gnostic motif is immediately stated in the novel's title and in Igor Mytarin's preface certifying the history of the OZ manuscript.

According to I. Howell, Gnostic motifs are clearly traced in the parable of the pearl and the connection of the pearl with John-Ahasuerus's hobby—collecting human souls. Properly, in the parable of the Gospel of Matthew (Matthew 13:45), the Kingdom of Heaven is likened to a rare pearl for the possession of which the merchant sold everything he had. Followers of Christ were to renounce everything for the greatest gift. In one of the Gnostic texts ("Acts of Thomas") there is the "Hymn of the Pearl", which contains a similar plot. The pearl is guarded by a huge serpent, and only the hero of the parable manages to lull it and seize the jewel. The serpent is the ouroboros, and the pearl is the divine beginning hidden from most earthly inhabitants. The Strugatskian version of this parable is presented with "pseudo-scientific objectivity" and begins with an encyclopedic explanation of what a pearl oyster is. The pearl is spoken of from purely utilitarian positions. It then turns out that Ahasuerus—also the apostle John—discovers the Gnostic analogy between the pearl and the human soul and makes the first deal to buy a "shadow" which will still uselessly go to the banks of the Styx.

The Gospel story is immediately stated by one of the two epigraphs to the novel. One of the foundational motifs of the legend of the Eternal Jew is the motif of the insult inflicted on the Savior by some servant of the high priest (John 18:22), who in subsequent tradition became identified with the high priest's slave Malchus. The one who insulted Christ was doomed to wander until the Second Coming. The legend of John the Theologian also speaks of the apostle never dying. One step remained to connect the legend of eternal expectation of the Last Judgment with the Eternal Jew. However, this layer is presented in the novel at a satiro--fantastic level, and Ahasuerus Lukich became a jester character, like Behemoth in The Master and Margarita. In Tashlinsk, he passes himself off as an insurance agent and moves into the astronomer's room in the hotel-dormitory at the Steppe Observatory. Subsequently, living together with Manokhin and other servants of the Demiurge in a communal apartment, Ahasuerus entertains them with various stories about his past in Palestine and exile on Patmos, turned in the astronomer's manuscript into speech recorded in the third person.

According to I. Neronova's calculations, Overburdened with Evil contains five episodes involving Gospel heroes. The proper Gospel plot concerns only Judas with his version of the history of the Last Supper and subsequent up to Peter's flight and the beginning of John-Ahasuerus's story. Jesus Christ in the novel's text is most often called the Nazarene or Rabbi. There is no mention at all of Christ's divinity, and his transcendent essence is manifested already in the image of the Demiurge, shown by the Strugatskys from the point of view of Arian-Manichaean ideas of the limited omnipotence of the Creator and the burdening of his creations with evil. In addition, the epigraph to the novel refers to the Gnostic hierarchy of worlds, in the series of which the Creator of the existing world, the Demiurge, turns out to be only one of the lower supramundane instances, but precisely the one concerned with cultivating a race of spiritual beings capable of overcoming their "burden with evil". Indirectly, his role as Demiurge is indicated by his naming: at the very beginning Yahweh — God the Father, and in the Islamic chapters Rahman. In the article by V. V. Barthold, which served the authors as the main source, it is noted that the Jews of Israel called him that during the formation of the Talmud, and in Yemen Christians used this name in the Trinity formula to denote God the Father. The Demiurge clearly embodies the Old Testament tradition: quick to retribution, not inclined to manifestations of love and mercy, and even raises the righteous in his eyes, but does not love them.

==== Judas and Rabbi ====
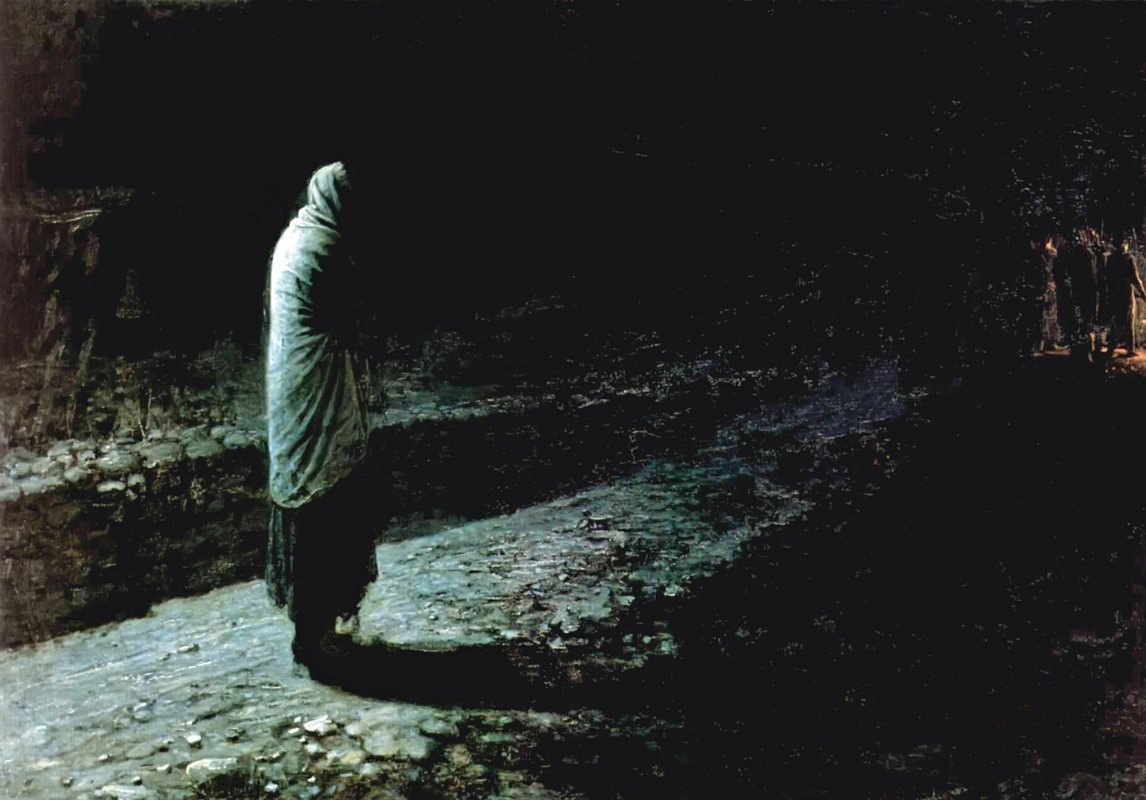
Nikolai Ge. Conscience. Judas. 1891, State Tretyakov Gallery

According to philologist S. Yu. Tolokonnnikova, the pretext for the Judas line in Overburdened with Evil was Leonid Andreev's novel Judas Iscariot. In the scenes involving Judas (which are also devoted to the figure of the Rabbi—the Nazarene), the apostles John, Peter, and Thomas figure, as in Andreev. In principle, it can be said that the Strugatskys actively used the Andreev tradition, although polemicizing with it. This is expressed in the fact that the characteristics of the apostles and Judas himself have no analogues. Judas in the Strugatskys' depiction is a feeble-minded "snotty gosling" about sixteen years old, which does not fit at all with either the Gospel prototype, or with Bulgakov's Judas (who is beautiful and essentially not a villain, just a weak man), or with Andreev's image. The only thing that unites all three literary interpretations is the acceptance of Judas's ordinary human nature. The differences lie in the fact that in Bulgakov he is stupid, in Andreev literally devilishly clever, and in the Strugatskys—this is an unhappy debile (in the medical sense): "There was nothing for him in this world. No food. No women. No friendship. Not even a simple kind word..." In a certain sense, this is a lowered parallelism to Andreev's interpretation, in which even Jesus did not love Judas: Judas was despised, though feared. Both Judases loved their Teacher: Andreev's — selflessly, with anguish; for the "snotty gosling", the Rabbi was the only one who treated him with warmth: "The Rabbi put his hand on his head, a narrow clean hand without rings and bracelets, and he somehow immediately understood that this hand would not grab him by the hair and hit his face against the raised knee. This hand exuded good and love. It turned out that there was still good and love left in this world." The Strugatskys also preserved the rivalry between John and Peter shown by Andreev for the right to be considered the beloved disciple, the winner of which was John. At the same time, all scenes with Judas and the Rabbi are completely devoid of pathos, which is generally uncharacteristic of the late Strugatskys' work. In this, they are close to postmodernism, which unites them in the desire to ironically, sometimes parodically or on the principle of shock revise established myths and stamps, tradition in general. Nevertheless, like the ancient heretic-Gnostics and Andreev, in the Strugatskys the core of the Gospel narrative remains untouched: Judas, even pitiful and feeble-minded, is the conductor of Providence, what must happen. In Andreev, he consciously commits betrayal of Christ, accepting the crown, and in the Strugatskys this is an uncomprehending instrument having no relation to good or evil. Essentially, he is the last of people, so stupid that he did not even understand what he did and what he is accused of. In the scene with the kiss, in Tolokonnnikova's opinion, the Rabbi asked forgiveness from Judas for the torments the unfortunate would suffer in the near future. In Andreev, Judas's mission is high, he considers himself Jesus's brother; in the Strugatskys, before he got to the Demiurge again, Judas obviously suffered, and all the more terrible that senselessly. Only sometime in the future will Ahasuerus Lukich (John) say to him: "Wipe your snot. It's all long past and forgotten. Come on. He wants to see you." In a sense, the postmodern profanation of the image of Judas led not only to his humanization, but also to becoming "poor in spirit", worthy of the Kingdom of Heaven.

The interpretation of Jesus Christ only as a teacher led the Strugatskys to a non-standard model of considering His image (presentation from Ahasuerus Lukich's perspective). The Christian tradition interprets the crucifixion of Jesus Christ completely differently—as the sacrifice of the Son of God for the redemption of human sins. This is the ultimate goal of His stay on earth, and He, knowing what lay ahead, yielded to weakness and prayed in the Garden of Gethsemane "Let this cup pass from me". For the novel's Nazarene, the crucifixion is only an extreme means to reach people's hearts with a sermon of good and peace or at least a reason for people to think. That is why the Rabbi patiently and at length explained to Judas where to go and what to say needed to be done, and did not calm down until he repeated the order correctly and without stumbling for the third time in a row. The betrayal turned out to be the fulfillment of the will of the beloved Rabbi, and the story about it is put into the mouth of the fool Judas himself. Even the notorious thirty pieces of silver are taken from Judas by the "positive" Peter, which is inconsistent with any interpretations of the Gospel narrative. In general, through the perception of the feeble-minded Judas, the apostles are shown only in everyday terms, and these are extremely unpleasant figures: John is "dangerous", does not part with a dagger; Thomas is "poisonous, like rotten fish"; Peter is arrogant, "every morning pesters with moralizing, to understand which is as impossible as the Rabbi's speeches, but only the Rabbi never gets angry, and Peter only gets angry and nags." In other words, the Gospel story receives a rational and ethical-psychological, "humanitarian" explanation. The role of the Teacher completely loses sacredness and can be characterized as "paradigmatically productive."

==== Islamic apocrypha ====
One of the unusual pretexts of Overburdened with Evil is the history of the false prophet Musaylima, based on the article by V. V. Barthold, first published in 1925. The Islamic history is devoted to three chapters of the OZ manuscript, introduced by the sudden nocturnal intrusion into the apartment of an Arab from the 7th century and a battle between him and Ahasuerus Lukich not for life, but to the death. In Academician Barthold's article, based on extremely scarce sources, the history of the apostasy from Islam that engulfed Yamama after the death of the prophet Muhammad is reconstructed. Musaylima was apparently one of the competing prophets of monotheism, standing at the head of the sedentary tribe of Banu Hanifa. He tried to conclude an alliance with the "false prophetess" Sajah, and one tendentious source characterized the union of Musaylima and Sajah as a dissolute connection, and their wedding as an orgy. It is this version that the Strugatskys chose, completely inventing all the details, stylizing them as Arabic poetry. For example, all sources testified that Sajah did not participate in the battle of Akraba in 634, when Musaylima was defeated and killed. Barthold also reported that Musaylima preached figuratively, using unusual words, sometimes in the form of short parables set forth in rhymed prose (saj' ). The academician quoted some of the saj's used by the Strugatskys verbatim. Mujja ibn-Murara, according to Barthold, in the battle of Akraba led a small detachment of Musaylima's troops and betrayed the false prophet, remaining the only survivor of his people.

Manokhin met Mujja ibn-Murara one day when all the inhabitants of the Demiurge's apartment woke up from cries that "it is not given to a slave to fight, his business is to milk she-camels and tie up their udders." Ahasuerus Lukich, nevertheless identified by the visitor, appeared without a prosthetic ear and with his lower back wrapped in a black woolen scarf. He responds with no less exotic quote incomprehensible to Manokhin (and readers), but quite clear to the visitor: "Defend your fields, give shelter to the seeker of mercy, drive away the insolent! Why don't you say these words to me, Mujja ibn-Murara?" I. Howell compared the quotes with the original in V. V. Barthold. The article discusses that the tribe of Banu Hanifa living in Yamama was agricultural and feuded with neighboring cattle breeders. The indicated text was part of Musaylima's sermon glorifying his agricultural subjects. Mujja ibn-Murara, who betrayed after Musaylima and his new ruler—Muhammad—wants to achieve an audience with the Demiurge, who for him is Rahman — the Muslim God merciful, compassionate, to receive forgiveness for sins. The dialogue between Ahasuerus-Rahhal and Mujja looks like a "fantastic mixture of incomprehensible (at first) Islamic oaths, exoticism in the style of One Thousand and One Nights, and exaggerated cruelty." Mujja threatens Rahhal, he responds that he will unleash ifrits and jinn on the intruder (in their image, the other communal apartment inhabitants parodically appear). Finally, the Arab uses a forbidden technique: reminds that long ago his fatal woman Sajah was betrayed by Mujja ibn-Murara himself, "so that the devil Rahhal, tormented by lust, would leave Musaylima's army." After this, Ahasuerus calmly kills him, (Note: Ahasuerus-Rahhal Lukich uttered the phrase "You must be strictly punished", repeating what he did back when he was the apostle John, a former robber: with the same phrase he killed the true Eternal Jew, whose curse passed to him. Boris Strugatsky in an offline interview on May 25, 2001, commented that the tragicomic scene and double repetition of the phrase in the same context was necessary to show that "the case with the real Ahasuerus was not some exception for John at all. And it was especially important to show this 'on the material' of Ahasuerus Lukich—this plump, cozy, absurd, and harmless little man." The phrase came from a fable about Comrade Stalin, who "had the habit of throwing these words at the guilty, and these words meant—execution. There were cases when the guilty fell as if mowed down, unconscious...") and then sobs for a long time about the love forever lost to him: Sajah was executed by a Byzantine presbyter. (Note: Psychotherapist and writer Sergei Gluzman particularly drew attention to the fact that in the structure of the novel, Ahasuerus Lukich is the only character who experienced a romance with a woman. Nothing like this can be imagined with the Demiurge; G. A. Nosov was once married, but "nothing is known about his love affair. His wife was an epidemiologist and many years ago accepted a heroic death at work, contracting some terrible disease." Truly in love—albeit bitterly and tragically—was only Ahasuerus Lukich, and this only "enhances the human dramatics of his long, two-thousand-year biography.")

According to I. Howell, the content of the pretext in the novel action is of no importance: the authors fully used the form. In Barthold's article, Musaylima is reproached for deception, since the Merciful God appeared to him in the darkness, while Muhammad identified God with light. In the Strugatskys, darkness is used to characterize the mythological space. Mujja ibn-Murara stands on the threshold between the hallway and the Demiurge's reception room. The doorway is blurred, dividing the light in the room and the darkness behind it where the stairwell should be. The hallway floor is covered with green linoleum (Soviet life of the 20th century), and the visitor stands on a "luxurious colorful carpet" from 7th-century Arabia, the corner of which spills out over the threshold onto the linoleum.

==== The Master and Margarita as a pretext for Overburdened with Evil ====
At the end of his life, B. N. Strugatsky categorically denied any connection between Overburdened with Evil and The Master and Margarita, asserting that the co-authors proceeded from a fundamentally different idea than Bulgakov's and did not intend to either "compete" or "even polemicize" at all. Nevertheless, many critics, including immediately after the book's release, perceived the echo of the two novels—Bulgakov's and the Strugatskys'—as a given. In 2014, based on Z. G. Khritonova's dissertation materials, a monograph was published, almost the entire first chapter of which is devoted to the forms of the Strugatskys' dialogue with Bulgakov on the material of Overburdened with Evil. Earlier, the researcher noted that "the influence of M. A. Bulgakov's creative experience on the authors of the novel 'Doomed by Evil' can be detected even by an inexperienced reader." The title complex of the Strugatskys' novel testifies to the commonality of the thematic complex, compositional features, heroes, and plot situation. In a sense, Bulgakov's text "clarifies" the text of the Gospels, the Strugatskys' text uses Bulgakov's text as a basis for constructing new "variants" on this "paradigmatic" basis.

At the very beginning of the novel, the hero-narrator Igor Mytarin declares the existence of two texts that will alternate in the narrative fabric: this is Mytarin's own diary and a text presumably created by the scientist Sergei Manokhin. Although parallels with The Master and Margarita are not stated directly, further the Demiurge is openly compared with Woland. The parallelism of plots in Overburdened with Evil is presented not fragmentarily, as in M. A. Bulgakov's novel, but fragmentarily: the text of one manuscript can break off literally in the middle of a sentence, and the continuation of the interrupted fragment appears much later. For example, the nineteenth chapter of the OZ manuscript begins with the phrase "The island of Patmos turned out to be a fairly lively place upon closer inspection," but this heading is separated from the main text by nine pages of Mytarin's diary from the morning of July 19. If in Bulgakov fragmentation does not interfere with the compositional integrity of the whole, then in the Strugatskys' novel, fragmentariness manifests itself at the level of the entire artistic construction, despite the presence of an introduction and afterword. In Bulgakov, the artistic effect is achieved due to the contrast in style of the "Moscow" and "Yershalaim" chapters, in which modernity is resolved as phantasmagoria, and the past is written out with extreme realism, with the maximum degree of concrete-historical detail. In "Doomed...", on the contrary, it is the ancient chapters that are phantasmagoric, woven as an integral part into the OZ manuscript. Manokhin as a "historical person" in this context directly refers to the Master—a historian by profession and vocation. The structure of the OZ manuscript is extremely complex, including many texts: chapters about the Demiurge and his retinue, narrative about John-Ahasuerus, into which the story of Judas is woven, and "Islamic" fragments. They are all united by the figure of Ahasuerus Lukich. In the narrative about the Demiurge, echoes with Bulgakov's The Master and Margarita reveal themselves already in the characterization of the very place of action—the "Bad Apartment". The Strugatskys fully exploited the possibilities of this technique: the combination of the extraordinary, fantastical, and everyday is inherent in the description of the house itself where the apartment without a number was located, overlooking Labor Avenue. In its description, the Strugatskys "as if decided to embody the dreams of Soviet citizens of the era of total deficit." Detailed enumerations of objects create allusive references to the Master and his novel, for example, mentions of the "Dictionary of an Atheist", book dummies, (Note: The Master and Margarita begins with a conversation between two atheists—members of MASSOLIT, whom Bulgakov calls not writers, but literati. Their works are essentially dummy, having no relation to literature.) and a primus stove.

To a certain extent, the Moscow chapters of Bulgakov's novel and the chapters of the OZ manuscript are related by the atmosphere of carnivalization. The scenes of Ahasuerus Lukich signing the "Transfer Act" for driver Grina's soul remind in many details of "Koroviev's tricks", including such a colorful detail as the briefcase of Nikolai Ivanovich Bosoy, only here it is handed over to the "opposite side." It is in this chapter that a direct reference to Gogol's Dead Souls appears, when a certain "Comrade Susloparin" offered into "the bottomless briefcase of Ahasuerus Lukich" "all his immediate subordinates with children and households." In the chapters set in antiquity, carnivalization manifests itself no less. Jesters are allowed to blasphemously laugh at the sacred, to turn the existing order upside down. Throughout the action, the motif of the artificial ear is associated with Ahasuerus Lukich, which he either forgets, loses, or puts at night in an alchemical vessel. However, it is John-Ahasuerus's ear that unites the Gospel primary source, the "ancient" and "modern" chapters of the novel. It is first stated at the level of the epigraph from the Gospel of John, and further it turns out that during the desperate attempt to fight off the Rabbi, the ear was cut off precisely from the apostle John. Finally, in the "modern" chapters of the Manokhin manuscript, we learn that the "eternal" Ahasuerus Lukich has acquired an "artificial ear." Similar "transformations" (remotely reminiscent of the adventures of Gogol's Major Kovalyov who lost his nose) are quite in the spirit of carnival laws. If parallels are drawn with Bulgakov's novel, it turns out that the carnival in "The Master and Margarita" has clearly defined boundaries, since it is connected exclusively with the actions of Woland's retinue in the Moscow chapters. Neither in the plot of the love of the Master and Margarita, nor in the story of Yeshua does carnival manifest itself. In the Strugatskys, the carnival motif of substitution is felt throughout almost the entire novel. Mismatches concern the most different characters. In this regard, the figure of the fascist Marek (Mark Markovich) Parasyukhin is indicative, who came to the Demiurge with a project of "complete and final solution of the national question within Great Russia. <…> Special attention is paid to the problem of the Jewish tribe. Not to repeat the mistakes of Saint Adolf!" However, the name and patronymic of this hero (Note: As in the name of Mordechai Mordekhaevich Gershenzon (Matvey Matveyevich Gershkovich), the comic effect is multidimensional, since it contradicts the Jewish tradition of not giving a son his father's name.) makes one doubt his "Great Russian" origin. The pitiful Parasyukhin (who "puffs from tension" dragging various junk into his room, brings a prostitute there, and then he is drowned in the latrine in the World of his Dream) is clearly opposed to the buttoned-up Kolpakov. This character brought the Demiurge a project of "Necessary Organizational and Personnel Measures for the Preparation and Conduct of the Last Judgment Campaign", assigning himself the role of the "Beast from the Sea".

The once attempted construction of a love plot line is also associated with Ahasuerus Lukich in the story of Sajah. Its action is set in the era of the emergence of Islam in Arabia, where the immortal John-Ahasuerus in the guise of the devil Rahhal, associate of the false prophet-teacher Musaylima, was carried. (Note: Boris Strugatsky commented that Rahhal in the sources they used was in no way associated with the devilish beginning; it was an authorial assumption necessary for the plot: how illiterate desert nomads would perceive an immortal.) In stylistic terms, this chapter is built on two planes: at the beginning, an ironic tone inherent in the Gospel part of Ahasuerus's story. For example, the contemptuous nickname of the prophet Musaylima "Musaylima" is translated into Russian as "ragged Musaylima." But the very presentation of the love story of Rahhal and Sajah is worthy of the pen of a "thrice romantic master". (Note: "He was mad. The love of an old man usually produces a somewhat comic impression. This summer Rahhal turned six hundred and thirty-four years old. The love madness of an old man is no longer capable of causing either a smile or sympathy. It causes only fear. Rahhal was now unstoppable, nothing could stop him. Neither the army, nor the simoom, nor the earthquake. Nor even the sea. Nor even death. At least that's how he felt. He himself was more terrible than any simoom, earthquake, or death. He was called beloved again, and he risked being late.") The echo with Bulgakov's novel is obvious here, as is the use of altered verses from the Song of Songs: "Sajah. Oh Sajah! Sajah, daughter of the Tanh and Tamim! Your womb...", and the like. In the Strugatskys, the jester turns into a romantic believing not in relativity, but in the constancy of feelings. It is Ahasuerus-Rahhal who could utter the phrase with which this story ends: "No, apparently, the chain of times will never break, for truly, as strong as death is love, cruel as hell is jealousy, and its arrows are fiery arrows..." However, in the narrative, it is put into the mouth of Manokhin, very far from romanticizing life. According to Z. Khritonova, the love line manifests the Strugatskys' polemic with Bulgakov. In "The Master and Margarita", love appears precisely as a spiritual connection of two people; members of Woland's retinue know no love. In Overburdened with Evil, love and mutual attachment are powerful even over super-beings. Only here is the veil of mystery over Ahasuerus Lukich's mocking buffoonery slightly lifted, covering his unhealed spiritual wound.

== Critics ==
=== Perestroika ===
The novel, released during the perestroika period, was received with bewilderment by readers and critics. Strugatsky's biographer, science fiction writer Ant Skalandis, twenty years later asserted that the authors at that time "turned off the internal censor, boldly rushed in search of new forms and experimented more than in ten previous works combined", but in the full sense a new literature did not emerge from them. In his opinion, the novel Overburdened with Evil was overcomplicated, as the co-authors "did not have time to figure out what was happening, including in their own novel, which became a natural reflection of that turbulent and ambiguous time". Gennady Lavronenkov also believed that the authorial intent would benefit from compositional simplification, elimination of "excessive ambiguity and double-entendre". The composition of the novel, despite all its seriousness and multi-layered nature, demonstrates a tendency towards eclecticism. Critic Viktor Toporov directly called Overburdened with Evil a "perestroika novel", which turned out to be the weakest work of the Strugatskys, demonstrating the exhaustion of the genre's possibilities. "All the illusions of the sixties, overturned in the eighties, echoed in this novel with ideological, stylistic, and purely plot cacophony".

==== M. Amusin, R. Arbitman, S. Chuprinin ====
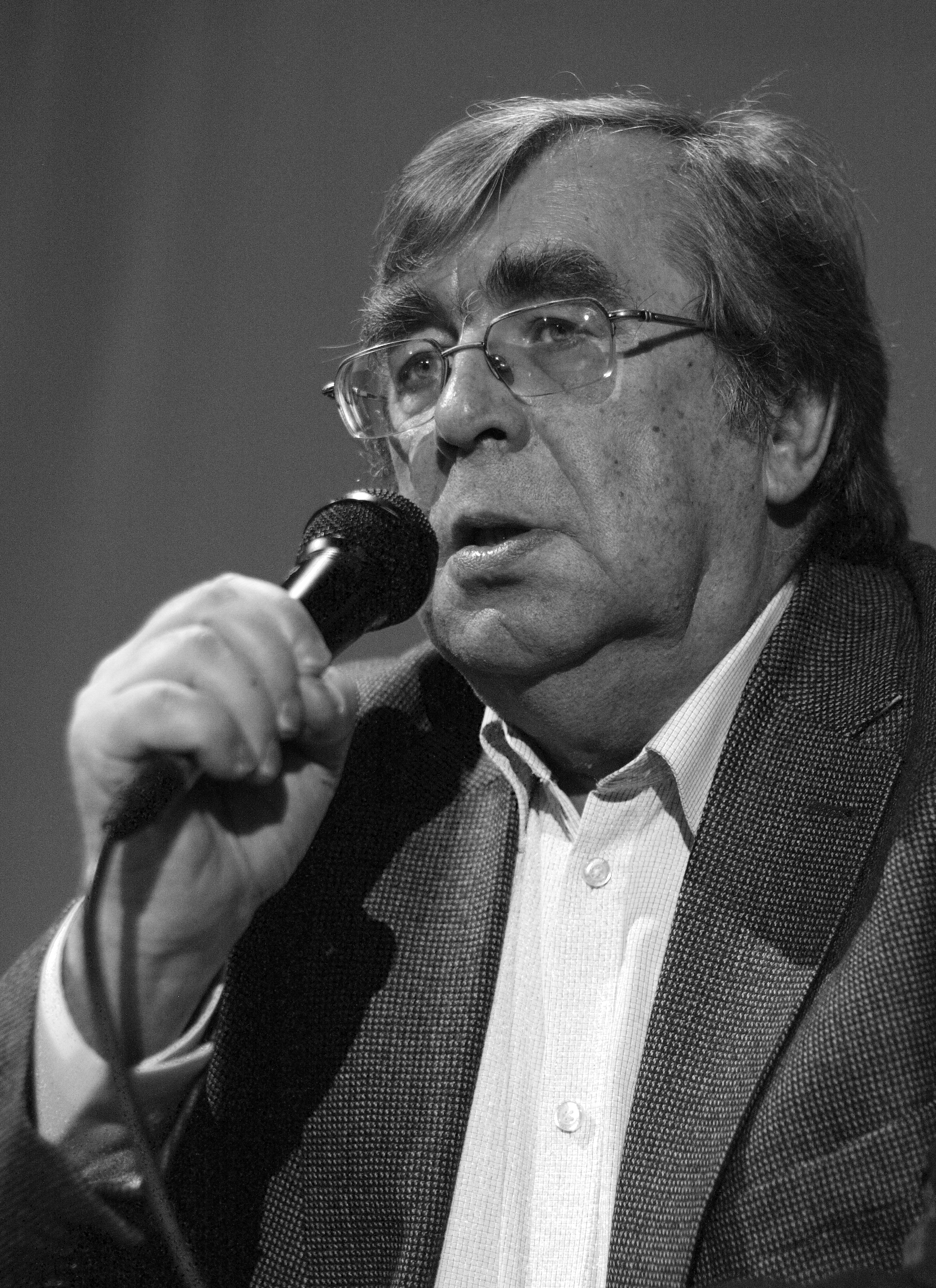
Sergey Chuprinin in 2010

Literary scholar Mark Amusin noted the twistedness of the plot into a möbius strip, due to which a fan of the Strugatsky brothers "will nostalgically sigh for the plot coherence and semantic transparency" of their early works. The novel is called a "historical carnival" in the genre of phantasmagoria, and its most successful elements are recognized as the comic effects arising at the intersection of satire, anecdotes, farce episodes, and historical sketches. As the prototype of Flora, M. Amusin named the so-called "system", which for the Strugatskys became a metaphor for a society at the turning point of epochs. The novel's finale is open, and the boundary contours of the narrative are blurred. It remains unclear to the reader whether the Teacher accepted the martyr's crown or handed over his soul to the Demiurge to escape the impending violence. Later, the critic noted that the late stage of the Strugatskys' work is characterized by a preaching of wisdom, a call for tolerance and the broadest understanding of others' views. M. Amusin noted the similarity of the problems touched upon by the writers in The Ugly Swans and Overburdened with Evil , but if in the 1960s novel they were indignant about the imperfection of human nature and society mired in vices, then in the 1980s novel they moved on to searching for therapeutic means, not on a global scale, but applied to each individual. The burden of existence with evil is perceived as an inevitable given. In the critic's opinion, this is not a sign of fatigue, but rather the farsightedness of the writers, who knew how to crystallize ideas inherent in their time. In this case, it is the thirst for practical humanization of life, even if not of an all-encompassing nature.

In his 1996 monograph, M. Amusin clarified that the religious or quasi-religious shift in the Strugatskys' work has been noted since the time of work on the screenplay for Andrei Tarkovsky's Stalker, which reflected the writers' disappointment in scientific and technological progress and reaction to the degradation of the living environment, including the ideological and spiritual. The critic compared the novel to a building in the baroque style, with stucco so abundant that it seems excessive, that is, the literary construction is too speculative. For the Strugatskys, Overburdened with Evil is an innovative text in which the writers abandoned linear unidirectional novel time along the vector "past — future" in favor of "eternal return": the same events are reproduced in different historical eras. A certain evolutionary stage has also been reached by the writers' semantic attitudes. Flora is almost an exemplary description of what was completely unacceptable to the Strugatskys for most of their writing career. Flora is comparable to the sled in terms of detaching people from cognition and creative world-building activity. However, being a phenomenon of life, it must be an object of protection from forcible eradication, just as the reality that gave birth to Flora. In the 1960s—1970s, the main means of eradicating social evil for the Strugatskys was social surgery, which in some works acquired almost eschatological features. In BE the authors decisively turned to the search for social therapy, and the entire pathos of the novel is tied to the "healing of civilizational ulcers". The Demiurge's clients (the same Kolpakov and Parasukhin) are subject to protection to exactly the same degree as Flora. Having finally become convinced of the fragility of each individual person's life and entire sociums, the writers turned to maximum tolerance towards all manifestations of life. Not being religious, the Strugatskys in their "last days" (the novel is dedicated to the situation of Fin de siècle) experienced an almost Dostoevskian feeling of "great orphanhood". However, the writers' worldview corresponded not to Christianity, but to Gnosticism, with its conviction in the burdening of matter with evil. Christian symbols were used as metaphors for the eternal renewal of being, and any transcendental component of Christian doctrine remained deeply alien to the Strugatskys.

Sergey Chuprinin tried to find in what seemed to him the "capricious turns of the author's thought the most relevant, living link", namely — a warning about how dangerous awakened crowd instincts are. The crowd reacts to any bait with extraordinary ease and allows itself to be incited against any "internal enemies" ("be it Jews, informals, intellectuals or just, say, redheads"). In this sense, the ideological content of Overburdened with Evil is not new for the Strugatskys, and the novel stands in the same row as Hard to Be a God and the recently published The Doomed City. The authors convince that good, allied with violence, inevitably degenerates into evil — and all the more dangerous because it still considers itself good. However, even this obvious truth has opponents who do not believe that "healing by violence" has not yet benefited society.

In October 1988, the Saratov newspaper Zarya molodyozhi published a record of a discussion about the Strugatskys' new novel Overburdened with Evil , in which Roman Arbitman participated. The introductory note mentioned that the novel puzzled the writers' fans, as it turned out to be "near-future fiction" for the first time: everyday realities are completely recognizable, and "there is absolutely no fiction in how the respectable city of Tashlinsk turned against the harmless Flora, trying to slander, expel, destroy it ("the saw is stronger, but the trunk is always right," the flowerers think). Flora threatens society in no way, from which it renounces". During the discussion, R. Arbitman expressed the opinion that the Strugatskys wrote an optimistic utopia, that is, they described a society in which "it is not scary to live" because nothing happens in it. It is impossible to transform this society without the participation of otherworldly forces (remark by philosopher V. Sokolenko).

==== Ntionalists' critics ====
Polish literary scholar Wojciech Kajtoch noted that since the Strugatskys retained all the basic themes and ideals traceable in their work since the 1960s, during the height of perestroika the writers found themselves in a moderately conservative position, "which, however, was quickly pointed out to them; as for the reaction of the offended nationalist circles, it was easy to guess".

Writer Sergey Plekhanov in the Literaturnaya Gazeta in March 1989 called Overburdened with Evil an "anachronism", as all the best works of the Strugatskys were written in the "stagnation" era and were part of an extremely specific context. However, by the time of publication of Overburdened with Evil , everything that had previously only been hinted at became open. "Aesopian language was created by a slave for good reason, and the skill of deciphering it was cultivated within the framework of a community of the unfree". The Strugatskys were accused of distorting history when the plot was kneaded "on ordinary semi-intellectual ignorance". The level of historicism of the writers was evidenced, in the critic's opinion, by attributing the famous phrase "I believe because it is absurd" to Augustine, and not to Tertullian. The critic's irritation was caused by the incident with the ear cut off in Gethsemane of the slave Malchus, in whose place was John. Patmos, like the entire Roman province of Asia, "was one of the paradise corners of the empire", and such blunders destroy the novel's construction. (Note: Boris Strugatsky in an offline interview on July 24, 2003, stated: "One of the 'ideas' of BE is expressed by the sacramental phrase 'it wasn't like that at all...'. This is the authorial position. And it was important for us to emphasize that the 'deviations' from the Gospel (and in general from commonly accepted 'facts') are not the result of our ignorance, but a deliberate technique. <...> By the way, one of the most furious critics of BE did not understand any of this, did not notice the epigraph and still accused the authors of ignorance of the Gospel".) As a result, "the only thing that the authors undoubtedly succeeded in is to reliably convey the heat of malice towards the 'soilists', 'broad Slavic natures'".

The tone of S. Plekhanov's review was such that it provoked a retort "for unprofessionalism and ingratitude" from literary critic I. Vasyuchenko, who also published a very critical analysis of the conceptual foundations of the Strugatskys' work. I. Vasyuchenko herself admitted that the novel is "artistically uneven", it has features of "hasty topicality", but at the same time its main message is a plea: "Be silent and think. For the time has come when nothing else can be done yet". Poetess Larisa Baranova-Gonchenko extremely negatively perceived the authors' attempt to "rise to their knees before the apostles" (referring to the chapter "It wasn't like that at all, not like that at all"), which will inevitably lead only to the debunking and ridicule of the "archetypal holiness" of any nationality and origin.

In the collection of literary-critical essays of the Molodaya Gvardiya publishing house in 1989, an open letter to the Soviet science fiction writers from some S. Klishin was printed, in which Overburdened with Evil was given a harsh assessment. The author focused on the image of the fascistizing "Great Russian":

Reading the Strugatsky Brothers, one might think that Russian antisemitism became the cause of severe persecution of Jews in Ancient Egypt back under the pharaohs. <…> It is quite understandable for the authors... to depict the so-called Russian patriots in the image of Parasukhin with his impudent blue eyes and "pederast's fluffy eyelashes". After all, tens of millions of Russians who died of hunger and in wars and their children with the same impudent eyes, gray and blue, prevented the chosen ones of God Yahweh from finishing off the antisemite Hitler themselves. Quite timely, Yahweh, the same Demiurge, is sung in the story. The other gods are mostly dead, like the ancient Greeks with their unfortunate Hephaestus and so on. But Yahweh is alive, and in his name many different "internationalist" deeds are done on the Middle East, in other countries and near cities.

Even more extreme reviews appeared. Yuri Petukhov, examining the Jewish question in literature at the end of the 1980s, declared the novel "gray", and its language as "a tracing paper from English". Ideologically, the Strugatskys directly proceeded to blackening Christianity, consistent blasphemy, blasphemy, and propaganda of Russophobia. The writers' work was directly called a moral AIDS.

==== V. Kazakov, A. Mirer, V. Serbinenko ====
Philosopher Vyacheslav Serbinenko received the novel negatively. From his point of view, the Strugatskys unsuccessfully continued the experiment of "direct contact with the Bulgakov's novel" and implemented the plot mentioned in The Ugly Swans: "And in general, it would be interesting to write how Christ comes to Earth today, not as dostoevsky wrote in the way he did, but as these Luke and company wrote". As a result, the "apocrypha from the one-eared Ahasuerus Lukich" is called the Strugatskys' greatest creative failure. In the chapters from the life of the 21st century, torn apart by the conflict of young "informals" with officials and philistines, an alternative to the writers' own utopia is presented. However, the Strugatskys brought nothing new to their traditional theme. The Teacher too much resembles the "mentors", humanist-enlighteners from previous works, and Woland-Demiurge "is engaged in the usual business for 'aliens' from the Strugatskys' previous books".

Bibliographer and activist of the fandom Vadim Kazakov (under the pseudonym Felix Snegyrev, as a character in the Strugatskys' play Five Spoons of Elixir) noted that the novel was addressed to a qualified reader and allows for multiplicity (and simultaneity) of reading options — whether according to the Holy Scriptures, or according to Bulgakov, or according to the fresh press with discussions on pedagogy and "informals". The critic noted that the Strugatskys as atheists were not interested in the theological features of the New Testament, from which only one theme was extracted — the Teacher and disciples, as well as "non-disciples". One Teacher, even of extra class, is unable to move society towards light and reason and cannot help but try to do so, even realizing that subsequently his ideas will be monstrously distorted. In the case of reading the novel in the current political context, one can come to the conclusion that the Strugatskys created a unique "socialist anti-utopia" (not communist, but socialist), continuing the ideas of the 1960s, since in the past era not everything could be said in open text and the argumentation brought to the end. The critic also noted the parallelism of ideas put forward by representatives of the power elite in The Ugly Swans and in Overburdened with Evil . However, the authors were in too much of a hurry to speak out, their novel "did not lie down", hence the stylistic underworking of the text.

Alexander Mirer (under the pseudonym "A. Zerkalov") in the afterword to the edition of the novel as part of the first collected works of the Strugatskys by the "Tekst" publishing house considered Overburdened with Evil a paraphrase of Bulgakov's Master and Margarita. There, and there, whimsically and openly altered New Testament plots are woven into the present, the Demiurge resembles Woland, as is directly stated in the novel, the name of the central character G. A. Nosov sounds almost like "Ga-Notsri", and his chronicler disciple Igor Mytarin is a projection of the publican Levi Matthew, who "incorrectly recorded" and "mixed everything up". Epigonism is a sign of reverence before the Master and a declaration that the Strugatskys undertook to develop the main idea of Master and Margarita. Bulgakov in the "monstrous thirties" postulated the doom of the Soviet empire, the cause of which is not God and not the devil, but people Overburdened with Evil. In the writers' own perception, their own world — of glasnost and civil liberties — is Overburdened with Evil no less, and the winged Demiurge is powerless in the same way as the lame Woland. Deity is forced to lay the burden of action on its creation — the Teacher, the Therapist. In Bulgakov, the teachers were Yeshua, who left no book, and the writer who destroyed his book. In the Strugatskys, power over the future is given only to the teacher in the most literal sense of the word, "teaching not mature men, but children". Mirer drew parallels with "Ugly Swans", in which it is postulated that the virus of evil can be killed only by raising generations pure from it. "This is the highest task, for which it is worth living and worth accepting death".

=== Wojciech Kajtoch ===
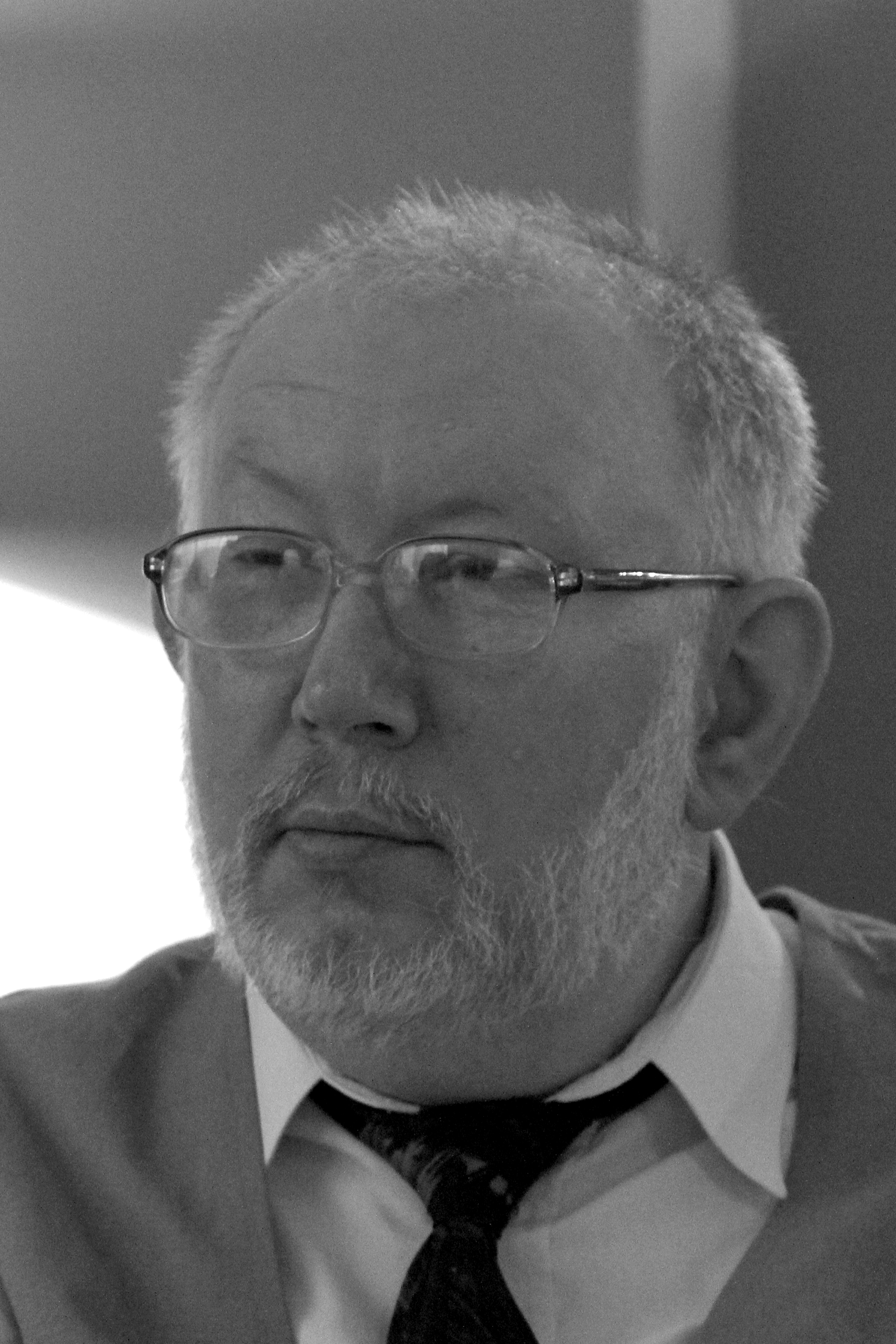
Wojciech Kajtoch in 2013

Polish Strugatsky scholar Wojciech Kajtoch, whose generalizing monograph was published in 1993, repeated the judgments of those critics who believed that the co-authors found themselves in difficulty after the elimination of censorship bans: "From the possibility of openly giving social advice follows that fatal fact that their value becomes easily verifiable". From the critic's point of view, the Strugatskys were tempted by new trends, as a result of which their prose of the last years of life quickly became outdated, and mentions of Afghanistan, drugs, and the like are "small literary hooliganism", rather "child's play". Overburdened with Evil is a work written in a state of severe creative crisis, it, "unlike many other works of the Strugatskys, cannot be read 'in one breath'". In terms of content, the novel continued the traditions of Master and Margarita, which became a commonplace in Soviet science fiction in the 1980s. This is also the only work of the Strugatskys in which religious and biblical motifs are used; V. Kajtoch directly calls the Demiurge Satan, and his main goal is "the search for people who know FOR WHAT they exist in the world", but more often he encounters "monstrous specimens of fanatics". Ahasuerus Lukich — simultaneously the apostle John and the Wandering Jew — appears in the "comic role of a NEP hustler", buying human souls in exchange for innermost desires. This plot line is filled with numerous literary allusions referring to Mikhail Bulgakov, Nikolai Gogol, Ilf and Petrov. This technique allowed the presentation of a gallery of human types of perestroika Russia, for example, the Great Russian antisemite Mark Parasukhin, whom the author doomed to "especially compromising adventures". Shocking is the image of Christ, provoking his own crucifixion in the hope of gaining the most effective tribune for proclaiming the truth. In general, V. Kajtoch considered the Strugatskys' gospel line "decisively inferior" to Bulgakov's concept. Moreover, the gospel line may seem superfluous in the novel, as its moral forms the holistic meaning of the work "no more than any other reference to the Gospel would do".

Nosov's line "surprisingly returns the brothers to the futurological ideas proclaimed a quarter of a century earlier", and the genre model is recognized as archaic. However, the basic idea — to try to present the USSR whose inhabitants would receive some democratic freedoms — is called "brilliant". Its implementation turned out to be unsuccessful, and "USSR Anno Domini 2033 too much resembles the USA of the sixties and seventies with characteristic 'wars' of hippies and motorcyclists, drugs and the sexual revolution". The Strugatskys directly stated that democracy is not enough for social organization and the power of the majority easily degenerates into "the dictatorship of mediocrity, stupidity, and primitivism". However, in the society of the near future, the germs of something qualitatively new (simply — communism) have already appeared in the form of an elite system of training pedagogical personnel, referring to the Strugatskys' "Noon" utopia. However, there is also Flora — a self-organized group of youth practicing complete tolerance in everyday life. Mytarin is simultaneously an evangelist and one of the future educators of humanity, he shows abilities of communist supermen. The efforts of his teacher Nosov end in defeat: like Rabbi-Christ of the previous plot line, he consciously decides on a desperate act and waits for the arrival of the police and volunteers in the camp of the new hippies. It is also known that the lyceums will be closed — "thus, at least temporarily, the 'germs of the future' are destroyed". Nosov's appearance in the Demiurge's abode, in V. Kajtoch's opinion, hints that the Teacher is seized by a great idea, but at the same time does not fall into the sin of fanaticism and does not agree to moral compromises even for the triumph of his cause. Judging by everything, the deal for his soul will never be made.

V. Kajtoch summarized that the Strugatskys retained faith in the necessity and possibility of re-educating society, which constitutes the basic foundation of "Russian and Soviet thinking about socialism". This does not cancel the literary shortcomings — the novel is hard to read and, being half a utopia, has no clearly defined plot. The description of Nosov's labors is not aimed at entertaining the reader or characterizing him as a literary hero: as in any utopia, the character serves to present this model of society and analyze the posed sociological and moral problem. After the collapse of the USSR, "it is doubtful that readers of Overburdened with Evil are still interested in the problems of the future socialism, so attentively examined in the utopian part of the work".

=== Post-Soviet era ===
Editor of the "black" collected works of the Strugatskys by the Stalker publishing house Leonid Filippov in the 2001 afterword characterized Overburdened with Evil as a book devoid of both science fiction and optimism. At the same time, the novel cannot be characterized as an anti-utopia, because it postulates that there will be no future created by human progress under any circumstances; there exists only an indefinitely prolonged present. The novel also cannot be attributed to postmodern literature, because it lacks escape from individuality, although there is enough hypertextuality and "literary travesty". The Demiurge's activity can be characterized as a role-playing game, since this was the main method of the Strugatskys as social thinkers. Sergey Lukyanenko in material for the Orthodox magazine "Foma" from subjective positions repeated judgments about the Strugatsky brothers' creative failure: "Just as many quite justifiably reproach them that they did not succeed in female images, so here — religious material did not work for them. <…> Apparently, they really wanted to give some of their own understanding of Christianity. In any case — it didn't work out. And this story is the only one I have never reread".

In publications of 2012—2013 (including in the essay collection Soviet Literature. A Short Course) Dmitry Bykov called Overburdened with Evil the most misunderstood and yet landmark novel of the Strugatskys. He considered the main plot line to be the story of the life and death of the great teacher G. A. Nosov. In the critic's opinion, the Strugatskys "as a result of personal and completely separate evolution" came to the only possible finale:

…There is no other way for a progressor, teacher, and Savior in general to save and educate except to perish before the eyes of the flock. No technologies of the Theory of Education, which in Burdened by Evil appeared as a deployed and triumphant exact science, will convince people who want to fight evil with surgical methods. "Everyone is a bone-setter, and there is not a single therapist" — this refrain of the novel (referring, in turn, to The Vicomte de Bragelonne) is relevant today as never before.

According to D. Bykov, the main quality of the teacher, as the Strugatskys wrote, is "not knowledge of techniques and methods, but holiness. Without it, nothing will work". Nosov went to martyrdom because tolerance is manifested not in relation to the good, but in relation to the unpleasant. One must be able to tolerate the unpleasant without denying it the right to exist. In the critic's opinion, all the heroes of all the Strugatskys' works are strong people with extreme experience, and the main conflict consists in the clash of Brutal and New heroes, forged by the war generation. "The question is the price of this experience, its costs, and alternatives to it. The Strugatskys have been concerned with the search for these alternatives from the very beginning. But somehow it turns out that all alternatives are worse".

Political scientist Yulia Chernyakhovskaya proposed in 2016 a consistently revisionist view of the Strugatskys' work in the context of the Soviet utopian project. The novel Overburdened with Evil (like the play Jews of Saint-Petersburg, Unmerry Conversations by Candlelight) belongs to the final stage of their work, reflecting the deepest disappointment both in the results of developing the project of a bright future and in perestroika aspirations; in particular, immoderate emotionally-protest activism, destroying along with negative beginnings the very foundations of society's development. In her opinion, in Overburdened with Evil the Strugatskys idiosyncratically synthesized the problem of the relationship between culture and power long developed by them. The model of society built in the book includes three acting principles:

1. Power and the society supporting it and expecting solutions to its problems from it.
2. The maturing system of the future in the form of an educational system created by a talented educator.
3. Anti-system, or possibly a system of anti-enlightenment — Flora — rejecting civilization and creating camps of alternative forms of existence, where people refusing civilization begin to lead a vegetative lifestyle.

The anti-system opposes both society and the enlightenment system, is a carrier of regression and degradation of the social body and causes society's protest demanding from power radical actions, up to forcible suppression. As a result of these radical actions (generated by the goals of protecting civilized life), power, in addition to the anti-system, destroyed the lyceum system — incubators of culture and enlightenment of the future. In metaphorical form, the Strugatsky brothers showed that power, which in itself is not a carrier of culture and enlightenment and does not understand them, leads to the destruction of those beginnings that could ensure the continuity and development of the power system through the creation of a system for producing samples that do not allow regression tendencies to destroy its achievements. Apparently, power that has allowed a break with culture, even striving to create a "society of knowledge" and the necessary "great theory of education" for this, will not be able to achieve its goal simply because it is unable to adequately assess the nature of the challenges. The new state and system of implementing the goals professed by power are not recognized by this power, and power begins to protect itself from itself. That is, even a justified and understandable protest against ugly tendencies in society's life can turn into the destruction not only of regressive, but also of emerging progressive tendencies — sprouts of a bright future. The novel was the Strugatskys' response to perestroika policy, which over time caused the authors more and more concern. By setting the action forty years ahead, the authors predicted the danger of active and immoderate enthusiasm for controversial and negative phenomena, inevitably leading to political hysteria and the destruction of the surreptitiously growing system of elements and foundations of the new society. (Note: Literally: "And our native hoarse ones have already started babbling, snorting, coughing — zealots of our good old days, arrogant witnesses of the times of Ochakov and the conquest of Crimea, who for the last half century have known life only from newspaper front pages and informational TV broadcasts, old dragoons of perestroika, who, it would seem, should now peacefully dandle their great-grandchildren and guard the comfort of family hearths — no, far from it! Forward, unfurling ancient banners on which one can still make out half-erased slogans: 'To the heavy rock — fight! To the non-our culture — fight! Flower-heads — root and branch!'")

In the 2022 monograph, Y. Chernyakhovskaya examined the Strugatskys' work in a broader context of scientific and technological romanticism. This literary direction is characterized by a general anthropological optimism and the postulate that for a person in the world it is impossible not to correlate oneself with ideals. "The world is given in sensations, but is subject to changes by man himself in accordance with the ideals of his consciousness, which appear as more significant". One of the possibilities for realizing such a worldview is historical romanticism, which turns the sublime-emotional beginning to the past. For example, in A. P. Kazantsev, this direction first manifested in the story Explosion (1946), the fantastic assumption of which (Tunguska event is an atomic explosion of a spaceship) became the basis of the classic novel The Burning Island (1957 and subsequent editions) and by the beginning of the 21st century was reflected in the dilogy Star of Nostradamus. I. A. Efremov consistently applied this method in his historical narratives:Baurjed's Journey (1953), On the Edge of the Oikumene (1949), The Razor's Edge (1963), Thais of Athens (1972). The Strugatskys belong to this direction, albeit with some reservations, precisely Overburdened with Evil . Transferring the emotionally-sublime state to the past affirms the naturalness of this state for human nature, its immanence as a generic distinction. Efremov, turning to the times of Ancient Egypt and antiquity up to the era of Alexander the Great; the Strugatskys, setting as the background of their narrative the first centuries of Christianity and Islam, considered man as a being going beyond everyday horizons, turning to entities knowingly superior to everyday experience. Only big meanings allow a person to overcome the challenges of this world.

A. A. Gritsanov noted that the Strugatskys "adequately assessed the real significance of the searches of representatives of advanced science of that time", asserting that the novel Overburdened with Evil can be interpreted as a model of the activities of the Moscow Methodological Circle. Literary scholar and philosopher I. Kukulin analyzed the connections of the Strugatskys' utopian model with the activities of G. Schetrovitsky's circle. The activities of the circle he headed in the 1950s were aimed at developing new forms of human thinking and social coexistence, and the newly created in 1957 Moscow Methodological Circle directly called for ensuring the possibility of forecasting and managing the development of various forms of socially significant activity. Its activities proceeded from the presumption: a group of specially trained and organized intellectuals can develop and consistently implement, according to developed algorithms, any scale of social environment transformation. Analogies of Schetrovitsky's and Strugatskys' concepts became the subject of discussions in the 1990s and raised questions during offline interviews with B. Strugatsky. In narrow circles of intelligent fans of the science fiction brothers, rumors circulated that the "chief methodologist" became the prototype of the "21st century teacher" G. A. Nosov, pointing to the coincidence of the name — Georgy. Boris Strugatsky negatively treated such questions, asserting that he had even heard the surname Schetrovitsky only in passing from A. N. Strugatsky, considering it "extremely unlikely that Arkady could use information about Schetrovitsky to create the image of Nosov". Nevertheless, "such an obsessive comparison in the environment of fans of the science fiction brothers" cannot be accidental: the historiosophical and ethical concepts of the Strugatskys and the leader of the methodologists' circle have many points of intersection.
