= Erik Yudin =

Russian philosopher and cybernetician

Erik Grigorevich Yudin (1930 – 15 January 1976) was a Russian philosopher and cybernetician.

In 1956, Yudin, publicly denounced the Russian invasion of Hungary. His employment was terminated, he was expelled from the Communist Party, and then arrested by the KGB and imprisoned. In March 1960, he was released from prison after numerous petitions from his parents. He then started to attended seminars of the Moscow Methodological Group run by Georgy Shchedrovitsky.

He participated in the development of activity theory. He was the first person to differentiate between activity as a “perspective” – which he calls an explanatory principle – and as an object of study.

== Works ==
English:

- Systems Theory: Philosophical and Methodological Problems(1977), (with Vadim Sadovsky and Igor Blauberg) Moscow: Progress Publishers
- "Philosophical principles of systemicity and the systems approach," (1979) (with V. N. Sadovsky and Igor Blauberg) Soviet Studies in Philosophy, Vol. XVII, No.4, 1979, pp. 46-68

Russian:

- Sistemnyi podchod i princip dejatel´nosti (1978) (The systems approach and the principle of activity) Moscow: Nauka.
