= Igor Blauberg =

Igor Viktorovich Blauberg (1928 – May 23, 1990) was a Soviet philosopher and cyberneticist. Blauberg was Head of Systems Approach and Interdisciplinary Research Laboratory of the Research Institute for Systems Studies in Moscow. He is known for his pioneering work in the field of systems theory in Russia.

== Selected publications ==
- Blauberg, I. V., and E. G. Yudin. Formation and essence of system approach. Moscow: Science 271 (1973).
- Blauberg, I. V., Sadovsky, V. N., & Yudin, E. G. (1977). Systems theory: Philosophical and methodological problems. Moscow: Progress Publishers.

Articles, a selection

- Blauberg, I. V., V. N. Sadovskii, and B. G. Iudin. "Philosophical Principles of Systemicity and the Systems Approach." Soviet Studies in Philosophy 17.4 (1979): 44-68.
- Blauberg, I. V., and E.M. Mirsky. "Interdisciplinary research groups in the structure of research front," Interdisciplinary Research Groups: Proceedings of the First International Conference, BRD-USA, 1980, pp. 26–33.
