= Vadim Sadovsky =

Vadim Nikolayevitch Sadovsky (1934–2012) was a Russian professor and Chief of the Department for Philosophical and Sociological Problems of Systems Research, Institute for Systems Analysis, part of the Russian Academy of Sciences. He is known as a promoter of systems theory in Russia.

== Selected publications ==
- Blauberg, Igor, Viktorovich, V. N. Sadovsky, and E. G. Yudin. Systems theory: Philosophical and methodological problems. Moscow: Progress Publishers, 1977.
- Vadim N. Sadovsky and Stuart A. Umpleby (ed.). A Science of goal formulation : American and Soviet discussions of cybernetics and systems theory. New York, Hemisphere Pub. Corp., 1991.
- Bogdanov, Aleksandr, and Vadim N. Sadovsky. Bogdanov's Tektology. University of Hull, Centre for Systems Studies, 1996.

Articles, a selection

- Sadovsky, V. N. "Foundations of general systems theory." М.: Sov. Radio (1974).
- Blauberg, I. V., V. N. Sadovskii, and B. G. Iudin. "Philosophical Principles of Systemicity and the Systems Approach." Soviet Studies in Philosophy 17.4 (1979): 44–68.
