= Moscow Methodological Circle =

The Moscow Methodological Circle (MMC) was a scientific organisation set up by Georgy Shchedrovitsky to examine problems from an inter-disciplinary point of view, looking at the various methodological approaches of each discipline to yield what they described as "systemic thinking activity".

The MMC started out as an informal group meeting in a pub on Gorky Street which included the mathematician Alexander Zinoviev, the sociologist Boris Grushin and the philosopher Merab Mamardashvili. They attracted the attention of the KGB but were tolerated.

The MMC developed an approach to methodological thinking, which featured these principles:

- holism and reflexivity
- practical orientation which uses systems thinking as the means for organising processes of resolving wicked problems by multi-professional and transdisciplinary teams
- reflexivity as practical recursive orientation of thinking to itself whereby it is able to re-construct and re-direct itself;
- the “methodological turn” from thinking about systems as objects to develop the process of thinking systemically

== Legacy ==
The MMC has had a lasting impact on Russian systems thinking particularly through the Methodological School of Management. This is acknowledged by Viktor Khristenko.
